= Air Stord =

Norwegian airline

IATA	ICAO	Call sign
GO	SOR	Air Stord
- Founded: January 1990
- Ceased operations: 19 January 1999
- Operating bases: Stord Airport, Sørstokken
- Fleet size: 3 (1999)
- Headquarters: Sørstokken, Stord Municipality, Norway

Air Stord A/S was an airline which operated between 1990 and 1999. Based at Stord Airport, Sørstokken, it operated a fleet of Beechcraft Super King Air and later Dornier 328 aircraft.

The airline was established as Nye Partnair A/S in January 1990, with largely the same owners and assets from the newly bankrupt Partnair. It was initially based at Haugesund Airport, Karmøy, but moved to Stord the following year following the purchase by Jon Furdal. The airline initially flew from Stord to Oslo. Flights started out of Skien Airport, Geiteryggen in 1993 and from Farsund Airport, Lista in 1996. The airline went through several owners, with Leif Georg Amundsen buying it in 1995. It struggled financially and filed for bankruptcy on 19 February 1999.

== History ==
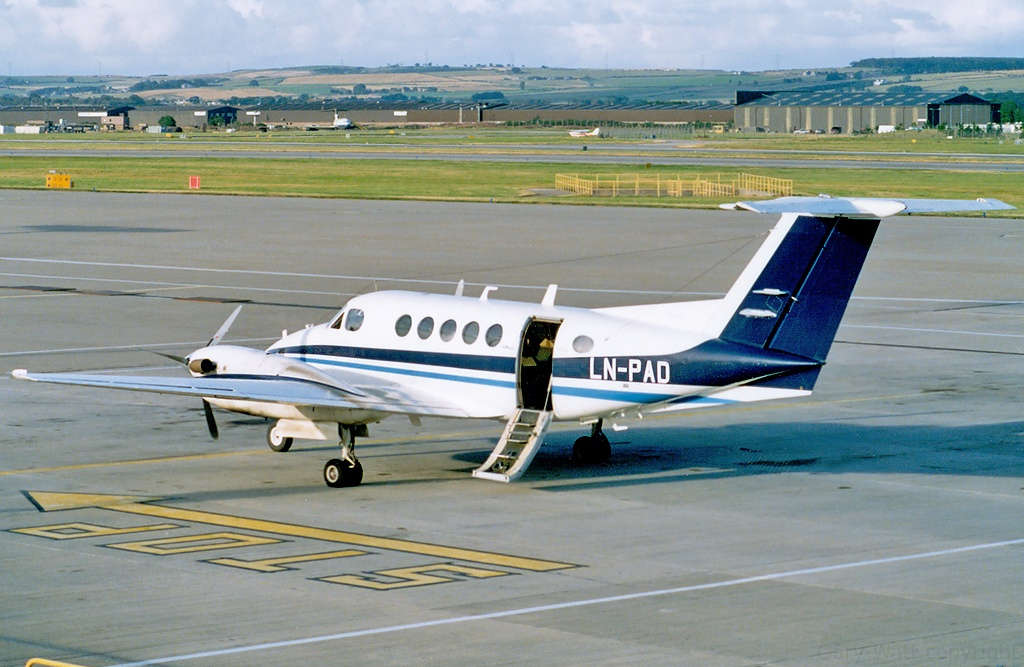
Air Stord Beechcraft Super King Air at Aberdeen Airport in September 1991

Air Stord had its origin in the aftermath of the bankruptcy of Partnair in October 1989. Its owners, the Thorsen brothers, established Nye Partnair ("New Partnair") along with Jostein Nerhus and Eirik M. Eide. The latter two were the owners of Fonnafly, which Partnair had bought half of in mid 1989. Nye Partnair was incorporated in January 1990 and bought large portions of the estate in bankruptcy. This gave it an initial fleet of four Beechcraft Super King Air and one Beechcraft King Air. The King Air was sold in 1991.

Nye Partnair was based at Haugesund Airport, Karmøy. It applied for and received concessions to operate a route from Karmøy to Stavanger Airport, Sola and Bergen Airport, Flesland. However, neither of these routes were ever started. At Haugesund Airport the airline took over Norving's former hangar and office facility and used it as a base. However, it instead chose to commence a service from Stord Airport, Sørstokken and Oslo Airport, Fornebu.

The Thorsen brothers sold 52 percent of the airline to Jon Furdal in May 1991. The Kvinnherad-based aircraft broker stated that he saw a potential for growth on the Oslo to Stord route. He also saw the need for a new name and to relocate maintenance from Haugesund to Stord Airport. Stord Municipality gave the company 25,000 Norwegian krone (NOK) to relocate, which took place on 27 July. By then the fleet was reduced to three aircraft and the airline changed its name to Air Stord.

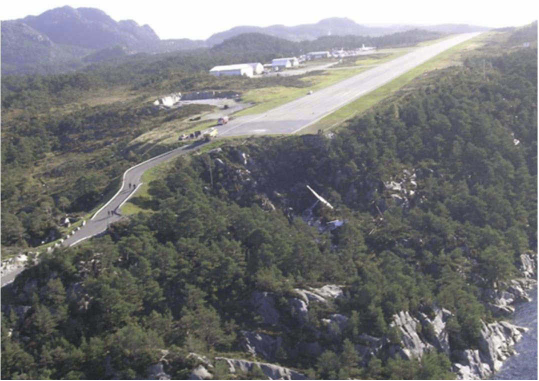
Stord Airport, Sørstokken

The airline increased from two to four daily round trips Monday through Friday from August, and introduced a fifth daily service on Tuesdays, Thursdays and Friday from October. The following spring the airline established its second route, from Stord to Stavanger Airport, Sola. The same year it bid for offering air ambulance services for the National Air Ambulance Service using Super King Airs, but the bid was unsuccessful. By 1992, Jon Furdal had bought all the shares in the airline. However, he chose to sell ninety percent of the company to Gregor Nysæter at the end of the year.

Both Air Stord and Coast Air were in April and May 1993 granted concessions on the route from Skien Airport, Geiteryggen to Bergen Airport, Flesland. The domestic aviation market was deregulated from 1 April 1994 and Teddy Air stated competing with Air Stord on the Bergen route. Air Stord flew 31 flights per week, compared to the 16 offered by Teddy Air.

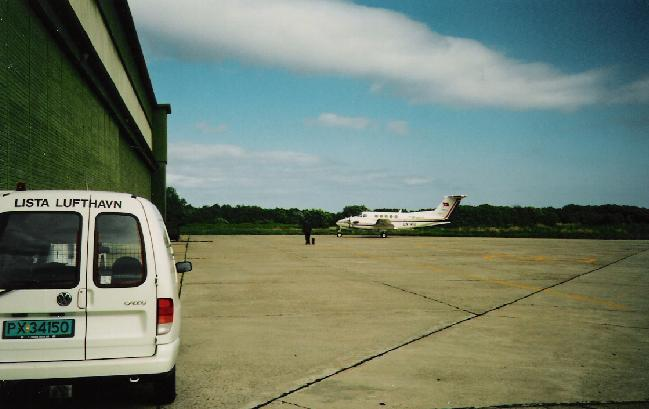
Beechcraft Super King Air at Farsund Airport, Lista

Teddy Air and Air Stord later commenced a cooperation on the route. Air Express considered opening a route from Oslo to Stord and proposed a cooperation with Air Stord. This led to a restructuring of the airline in 1994, with Nysæter selling the company. The airline was split into A and B shares. Aker Stord and Aker Elektro each bought 17.5 percent of the airline, Hardanger Sunnhordlandske Dampskipsselskap bought 10 percent and Inter Nor Stord Hotell and Åsmund Myhre each bought 5 percent. Later the group bought newly issued shares worth NOK 650,000.

The airline continued to lose money in 1994 and 1995. At the time Sørstokken had an insufficient runway to handle such aircraft. Leif Georg Amundsen from Bømlo Municipality, through Amundsen Holding, bought all the shares in Air Stord on 31 December 1995. He announced that with the forthcoming expansion of the runway and terminal that the airline would start using the 33-seat Dornier 328 on the Stord to Oslo route. With the take-over the company issued a capital increase of NOK 6.1 million, all bought by Amundsen Holding. With the work on the runway completed, Air Stord's first Dornier 328 could land at Sørstokken on 15 May 1996.

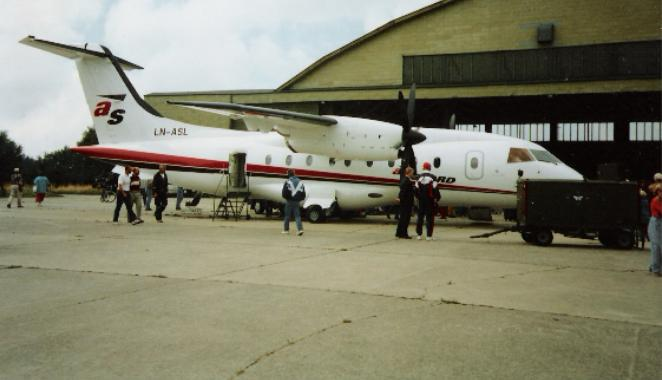
Christening of the airline's new Dornier 328 at Farsund Airport, Lista in 1996

Air Stord commenced scheduled services twice a day from Farsund Airport, Lista to Oslo and Stavanger from 24 June. Initially they used a Super King Air, later increasing to a nineteen-passenger Beechcraft 19. This was secured through two local shipping companies and the municipalities buying a significant portion of the airline. The Stavanger route was later terminated.

Air Stord retired its King Airs between 1995 and 1997. The airline continued to have ambitions of growth and in 1996 it announced that it would issue a capital increase of NOK 30 million. This was to secure finance of international routes, but neither these nor the capital increase were carried out, save for an eleven-million issue by Amundsen Holding. The airline went with a deficit in 1996 and in March 1997 it started bankruptcy negotiations. This led to a restructuring of the airline, which at the time consisted of two Dornier 328s and 54 employees. The ground crew were offered to establish their own ground handling company and a number of other employees were laid off. This led to all routes except Stord–Oslo and Farsund–Oslo to be terminated.

Air Stord was one of several airlines in 1998 to announce that they could operate out of a possible civilian airport situated at Rygge Air Station. The Oslo flights moved to Oslo Airport, Gardermoen on 8 October 1998. By then the airline was operating three Dornier 328s. The airline was under sustained financial distress and was not making a profit on its routes. Air Stord filed for bankruptcy on 19 February 1999 and the following day all services were terminated. The company had at the time 70 employees.

== Fleet ==
The following aircraft were operated by Air Stord.

Air Stord aircraft
Model	Qty	First in	Last out	Ref(s)
Beechcraft 200 Super King Air	12	1990	1997	
Beechcraft A100 King Air	3	1990	1991	
BAe Jetstream 31	2	1995	1999	
Dornier 328	3	1996	1999	

== Destinations ==
The following is a list of scheduled destinations served by Air Stord.

Air Stord destinations
Location	Airport	Period	Ref(s)
Bergen	Bergen Airport, Flesland	1993–97	
Farsund	Farsund Airport, Lista	1996–99	
Oslo	Oslo Airport, Fornebu	1990–98	
Oslo	Oslo Airport, Gardermoen	1998–99	
Skien	Skien Airport, Geiteryggen	1993–97	
Stord	Stord Airport, Sørstokken	1990–99	
Stavanger	Stavanger Airport, Sola	1996	

== Bibliography ==
- Hagby, Kay (1998). Fra Nielsen & Winther til Boeing 747 (in Norwegian). Drammen: Hagby. ISBN 8299475201.
- Reitan, Sverre Utne (2003). Luftfarten på Haugalandet fra 1914 til 2004 (in Norwegian). Karmøy: Eget Forlag.
- Resser, Tor (2005). Stord lufthamn Sørstokken (in Norwegian). Sunnhordland Lufthavn.
