= Partnair =

Norwegian airline

IATA	ICAO	Call sign
PD	PAR	PARTNAIR
- Founded: 30 June 1971
- Ceased operations: 11 October 1989
- Operating bases: Oslo Airport, Fornebu
- Fleet size: 32 (throughout the airlines history)
- Headquarters: Fornebu, Bærum Municipality, Norway

Partnair A/S was a Norwegian charter airline which operated from 1971 to 1989. During the later 1980s it was Norway's fifth-largest airline by revenue, operating a fleet of three Convair CV-580 and six Beechcraft Super King Air. The airline was based at Oslo Airport, Fornebu, as well as operating a base at Stavanger Airport, Sola.

The airline was established as Paralift in 1968 to allow a group of friends to operate a Cessna 182 for parachuting. The company went commercial in 1971 and acquired four Cessna twin-props by 1975. The airline focused on business charters. During the late 1970s the fleet was replaced with Piper PA-31 Navajos. The Partnair name was adopted in the mid 1970s. The first of what eventually became eight Beechcraft King Air and the later Super models was bought in 1978. Partnair briefly operated two Cessna 550 Citation II corporate jets in 1983.

The airline merged with Nor-Fly Charter in 1984, acquiring two Convair 580s. A third was added in 1986. It built a new hangar and office complex in 1985. The only spell of scheduled traffic, out of Notodden Airport, Tuven, took place between 1985 and 1986. The company went into a period with severe financial difficulties and went bankrupt in 1987, but soon revived. The crash of Partnair Flight 394 on 8 September 1989 was the final blow for the company, which filed for bankruptcy on 11 October. Operations were restarted in what became Air Stord.

== History ==
=== Paralift ===
The airline has its background in a group of parachuters who in 1968 established Paralift Air Service. The intention was to establish a company to own and operate an aircraft so they did not have to rent an aircraft each time they were parachuting. It took delivery of a Cessna 180 in February 1969, which it kept until August that year. It then took over a Cessna 182. These aircraft were both tailored as parachute-only aircraft. The following year the fleet was doubled with the arrival of a Cessna 310.

The company was incorporated on 30 June 1971 and received a commercial air operator's certificate in the fall. The airline took delivery of a de Havilland Dragon Rapide in August, configured for parachuting. The aircraft was kept until 1973.

Until the 1975 retirement of the Cessna 182, Paralift continued to operate parachuting flights. However, it increasingly focused on ad hoc and corporate charter. It targeted a growing market for executive charters using smaller twin-prop aircraft. Although slightly slower, they were significantly more economical that corporate jets. Paralift was able to operate many routes cheaper than scheduled services given that the entire aircraft was filled up. In addition, nonstop flights were available on any conceivable route combination, unlike scheduled services. Paralift was therefore successful at targeting smaller groups of executives traveling as a group.

Paralift operated out of Oslo Airport, Fornebu. It subcontracted maintenance to Fred. Olsen Airtransport and catering to Scandinavian Airlines System. For the business charter market the airline bought a Cessna 310 in 1970, a Cessna 320 and Cessna 401 in 1972. The Cessna 310 was replaced with a Cessna 402 in 1975. The Cessna 320 was sold in 1976 and replaced with the airline's first Piper PA-31 Navajo. Within three years Paralift was operating five such aircraft, and had also bought a Piper PA-31T Cheyenne and a Cessna 404 Titan.

=== Partnair operations ===
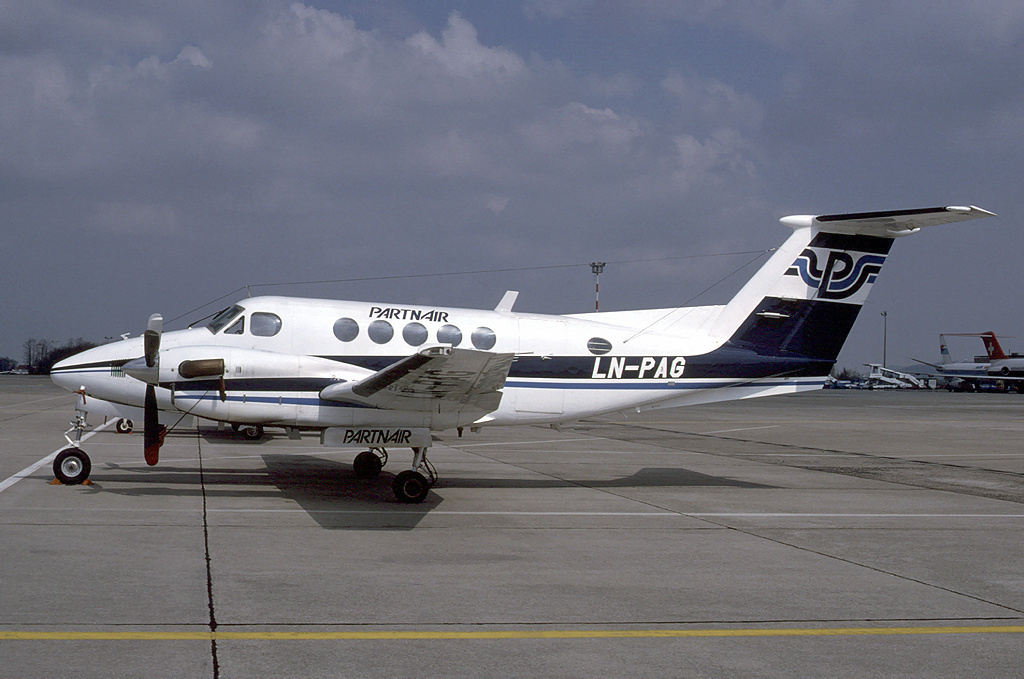
Partnair Beechcraft Super King Air at EuroAirport Basel–Mulhouse–Freiburg in 1986

Sometime between 1975 and 1977 the airline changed its name to Partnair. It saw increased business particularly from the booming oil industry. By 1977 the airline was the second-largest light twin-prop operator in the country. The airline flew 5,200 hours with its five aircraft in 1978. The Cheyenne was retired in 1980, replaced by a new Cheyenne a year later which remained in use until 1985.

The first Beechcraft King Air 100 was delivered in 1978, followed by a second in 1980. That year Partnair also took delivery of its first Beechcraft Super King Air 200. The airline gradually ordered more of these until operating six Super King Airs. A British Aerospace Jetstream 31 was ordered in July 1981, along with a further option, for delivery in October 1982. However, the order was canceled before delivery. Instead, Partnair took delivery of two used Cessna 550 Citation II corporate jets, but these were retired within a year. Partnair started using simulators to train their pilots from 1982.

The shipping company Tenvig bought the airline in 1983. In the following three years, they invested 43 million kroner in the company. From 15 May 1984 the former military terminal at Fornebu was converted into an executive terminal, named Terminal 2. In addition to Partnair moving its flights there, it signed a two-year contract to operate the terminal on behalf of the Civil Aviation Administration.

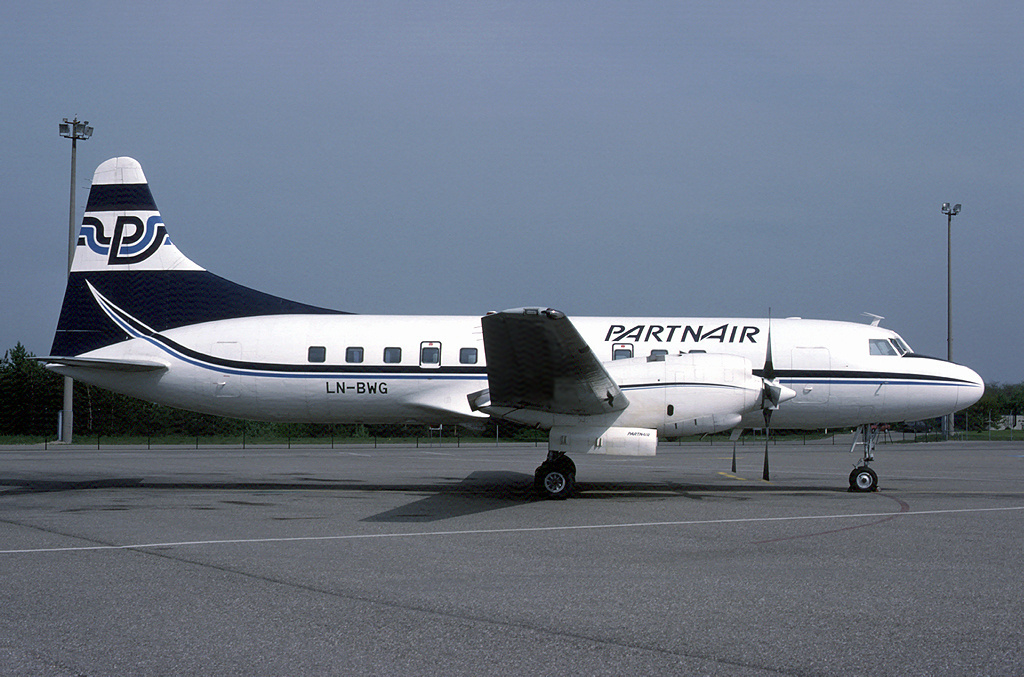
Partnair Convair CV-580 at EuroAirport Basel–Mulhouse–Freiburg in 1987

Partnair bought Nor-Fly Charter in September 1984. Nor-Fly operated two Convair CV-580s. Partnair used the aircraft to fly domestic charter for oil companies, mostly to Andøya Airport, Andenes, as well as larger corporate groups internationally. Nor-Fly had bought the two aircraft in 1980 and 1981, respectively; one was based at Fornebu and the other at Stavanger Airport, Sola. With the merger, Partnair relocated both aircraft to Stavanger. Maintenance on the Convairs was subcontracted to Fred. Olsen Airtransport.

A new hangar and office building was completed at Oslo Airport, Fornebu in May 1985, having cost 15 million Norwegian kroner. The hangar measured 1,350 square meters (14,500 sq ft) while there was 900 square meters (9,700 sq ft) of office space. At the time the airline had 75 employees. The company stated that the merger had allowed it to operate better in two separate market sizes and was able to better sustain the volatility in the air taxi market. About half the company's revenue came from each size of aircraft. In September 1985 Partnair started talks with Norving with the aim of a merger, but the talks never led to anything. A third Convair 580 was bought in May 1986.

In the second half of 1984 the airline developed plans to start scheduled traffic, and applied for concession to operate out of Sandefjord Airport, Torp to Gothenburg and Copenhagen. They also applied to operate a route from Oslo via Notodden Airport, Tuven to Stavanger. The Notodden concession was granted in March 1985, and the route was started on 15 August using Super King Air and flew twice a day, five days a week. This route was made possible after an instrument landing system was installed at the airport. The upgrades also included a new terminal. Ticket sales and check-in was managed by NSB Reisebyrå, a subsidiary of the Norwegian State Railways.

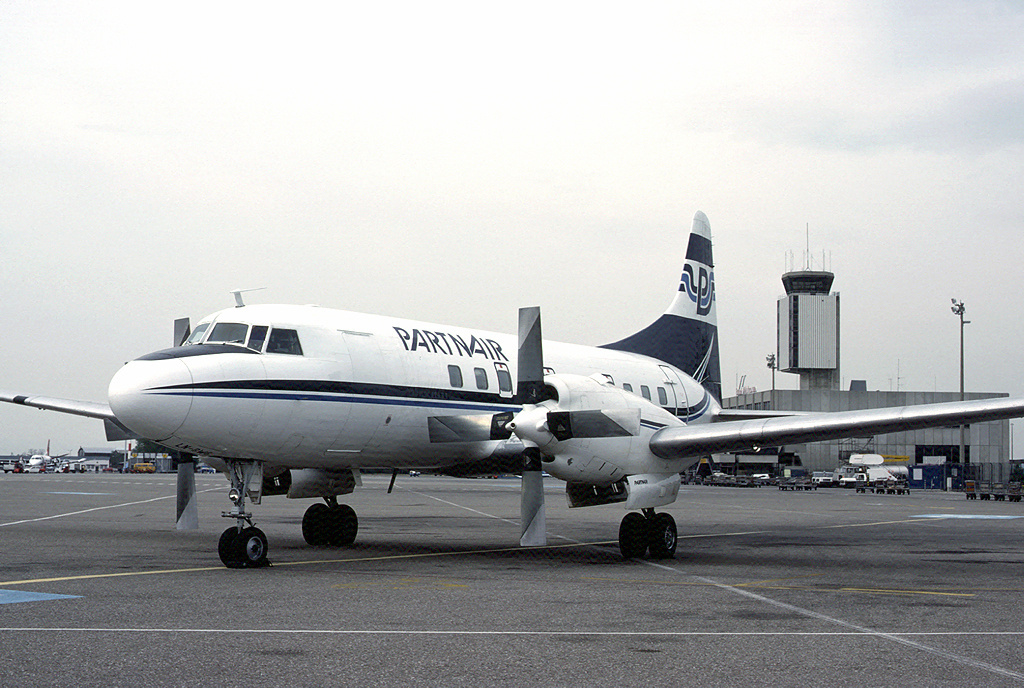
Partnair Convair CV-580 at EuroAirport Basel–Mulhouse–Freiburg in 1987

After five months, Partnair had lost 1.2 million kroner on the route. On average, they were selling three or four tickets per flight to Stavanger, and one to Oslo. From March 1986, the leg from Notodden to Oslo was dropped and the service to Stavanger reduced. However, the route proved unprofitable and was eventually terminated later the same month.

The company had a deficit of 6.5 million kroner in 1986. After having lost 10 million kroner of its investment, Tenvig decided to withdraw from the airline and closed it down in April 1987. However, seventy percent of the company was bought by Helikopter Service. The airline started operations again in August, legally as a new company, Nye Partnair A/S. It soon reverted to the former name. After about a year the company was again running without a deficit and Helikopter Service sold its shares to the brothers Terje and Rolf Thoresen. From then the company started losing money and had a poor financial result in 1988. That year the airline operated three Convairs and six Super King Airs. In terms of revenue, it was the fifth-largest airline in Norway, with 80 employees.

Parnair was one of several companies discussing a take-over of Norsk Air in 1988. The following year Partnair bought two smaller airlines, Fjellfly/Viking Air based in Kristiansand and 52 percent of Fonnafly based in Stord.

=== Accident and bankruptcy ===
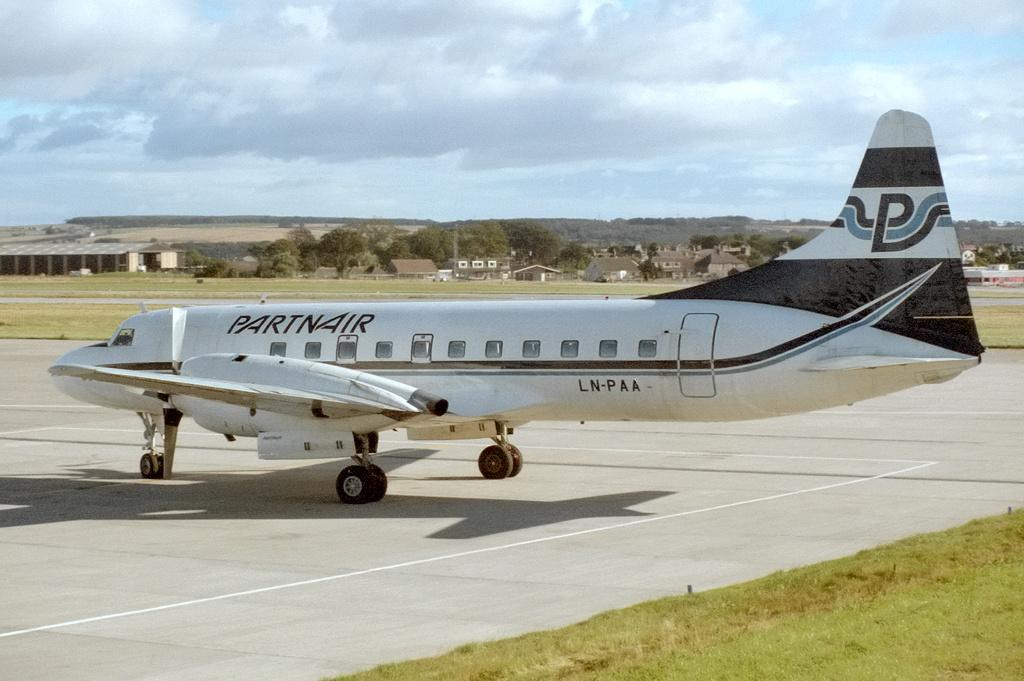
The Convair CV-580 LN-PAA was the accident aircraft in Partnair Flight 394, here at Aberdeen Airport in 1987

Partnair Flight 394 crashed in Skagerrak near Hirtshals on 8 September 1989, killing all 55 people on board. A central cause of the accident turned out to be the use of unapproved aircraft parts, specifically unapproved bolts fastening the vertical stabilizer to the fuselage. The findings spurred international attention to the issue of unapproved parts.

Immediately after the accident Partnair grounded the other two Convairs and laid off 17 of its 45 employees. The King Air fleet remained in operation. The company had a poor financial situation before the accident, which was severely aggravated with the accident. By October 1989 the airline was attempting to sell the Convairs. The company filed for bankruptcy on 11 October 1989. At the time the airline had few assets and about 15 to 20 million kroner in debt. All the aircraft were at the time leased.

The assets from Partnair were taken over by a new company, Nye Partnair A/S ("New Partnair"), which was owned by the Thorsen brothers along with Jostein Nerhus and Eirik M. Eide. Nye Partnair was incorporated in January 1990 and bought large portions of the estate in bankruptcy. This gave it an initial fleet of four Beechcraft Super King Air and one Beechcraft King Air. Nye Partnair was initially based at Haugesund Airport, Karmøy, but relocated to Stord Airport, Sørstokken in May 1991 and took the name Air Stord. The airline remained in business until 19 February 1999.

== Fleet ==
The following is a list of aircraft operated by Paralift and Partnair. It contains the model, the accumulated number of aircraft operated (which may exceed the peak county), the year built, the year the type first entered service with the airline, and the year the last unit was retired.

Partnair aircraft
Model	Qty	Built	First in	Last out	Ref(s)
Cessna 180	1	1956	1969	1969	
Cessna 182	1	1955	1969	1975	
Cessna 310	1	1964	1970	1974	
de Havilland Dragon Rapide	1	1944	1971	1973	
Cessna 320	1	1962	1972	1975	
Cessna 401A	1	1969	1972	1976	
Cessna 402B	1	1970	1974	1976	
Piper PA-31 Navajo	6	1969	1975	1984	
Piper PA-31T Cheyenne	2	1977	1977	1985	
Cessna 404 Titan	1	1977	1978	1981	
Piper PA-31 Chieftain	3	1979	1979	1984	
Beechcraft King Air 100	2	1970	1978	1989	
Beechcraft Super King Air 200	6	1976	1980	1989	
Cessna 550 Citation II	2	1979	1983	1984	
Convair CV-580	3	1953	1985	1989	

== Incidents and accidents ==
- On 25 September 1977, a Piper PA-31 Navajo registered as LN-PAA crashed into the sea off Oslo Airport, Fornebu. There were no fatalities, although the aircraft was written off.
- On 13 March 1987, a chartered Beechcraft King Air (LN-PAG) with six passengers crashed during landing at Stord Airport, Sørstokken, 20 metres ahead of the runway. The aircraft skidded for about 100 metres before coming to rest in a snow bank. There were no injuries.
- On 8 September 1989, Partnair Flight 394, a Convair CV-580 (LN-PAA) chartered by a Norwegian shipping company to fly from Oslo to Hamburg, crashed off the Skagerrak coast in Denmark near Hirtshals killing all 55 people on board.

== Bibliography ==
- Accident Investigation Board Norway (1993). Report on the Convair 340/580 LN-PAA Aircraft Accident North of Hirtshals, Denmark, on September 8, 1989 (PDF).
- Hagby, Kay (1998). Fra Nielsen & Winther til Boeing 747 (in Norwegian). Drammen: Hagby. ISBN 8299475201.
- Reitan, Sverre Utne (2003). Luftfarten på Haugalandet fra 1914 til 2004 (in Norwegian). Karmøy: Eget Forlag.
- Resser, Tor (2005). Stord lufthamn Sørstokken (in Norwegian). Sunnhordland Lufthavn.
- Tjomsland, Audun (2005). Høyt spill om Torp (in Norwegian). Sandefjord: Tjomsland Media. ISBN 82-997212-0-2.
