= Teddy Air =

Regional airline in Geiteryggen, Norway, 1989–2004

IATA	ICAO	Call sign
ZJ	TED	Teddys
- Founded: 1989
- Ceased operations: 2004
- Hubs: Skien Airport, Geiteryggen
- Headquarters: Skien, Norway

Teddy Air AS was a regional airline, based at Skien Airport, Geiteryggen, in Norway. Operating between 1989 and 2004, the company operated Britten-Norman Islander, Embraer 110 and Saab 340 aircraft. The company started by providing a scheduled service between Skien and Oslo in 1990, followed by services to Stavanger in 1993 and Bergen in 1994. In 1996, it won a contract with the Ministry of Transport from Oslo to Fagernes. It was involved in intense competition with other regional airlines, notably Coast Air and Guard Air, following the deregulation of the aviation market. It also had a single international service to Gothenburg, and from 1999 it served Stord Airport, Sørstokken. From 1999, the company was transformed to a virtual airline, which wet leased aircraft from Golden Air. The company ceased operations in 2004.

== History ==
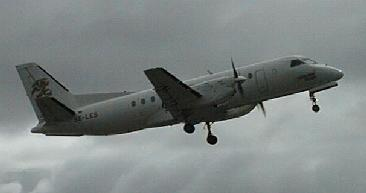
Golden Air Saab 340 in Teddy Air livery taking off from Stord Airport, Sørstokken

=== Establishment ===
In April 1988, Norwegian regional airline Norving terminated all scheduled services in Southern Norway. As a consequence, airports such as Skien Airport, Geiteryggen, were left without an airline and services to the capital, Oslo. Teddy Air was subsequently established as a Skien-based company to provide an air route between Skien and Oslo Airport, Fornebu. Founded by Harald Sørensen in 1989, the largest owners were Skien Business Development Fund and Telemark Business Development Fund. It would provide four round trips with a Britten-Norman Islander. The company stated that it needed 8,000 passengers annually to cover costs, with the ticket price set at about 500 Norwegian krone (NOK). The fiercest competition would come from the Vestfold Line of the Norwegian State Railways, where a train from Skien to Oslo ran each hour. The three-hour train trip cost NOK 167, compared to the 25-minute flight. Concession was granted by the Ministry of Transport and Communications in August 1989, but the airline did not commence operations until 18 July 1990.

In Grenland, the metropolitan area surrounding Skien, there was a lot of opposition to the airline, and several local businesspeople claimed that it would be better if Norsk Air was awarded the contract, or Skien Airport was closed and locals instead used the nearby Sandefjord Airport, Torp. Norsk Air stated that it would not be possible for them to make money on the Skien–Oslo route; despite that, it operated from Skien to Bergen Airport, Flesland and Stavanger Airport, Sola. In 1993, Norsk Air announced that it would no longer fly from Skien, and would focus all their operations at Sandefjord. Teddy Air subsequently took over the Stavanger route, while the Bergen route was granted to Air Stord, despite Teddy Air having applied for the concession. In 1994, the company had a revenue of NOK 7.5 million, and a NOK 1 million profit.

=== Expansion ===
Following the deregulation of the airline market in 1994, which allowed any European Economic Area-airline to operate any route they wished, Teddy Air tried to start services at Moss Airport, Rygge. Since it at the time was the military-only Rygge Air Station, with no passenger facilities, the airline was not successful in receiving permission. However, it did choose to start competing with Air Stord on the Skien–Bergen route, starting 8 May 1995. Using its Embraer 110 aircraft, it launched tickets for under NOK 1000, compared with the NOK 1290 price offered by Air Stord. The latter had aircraft half the size, but offered 31 flights per week, compared to the 16 offered by Teddy Air. In addition, Coast Air launched two weekly round trips. The routes were mainly used by commuters working on offshore oil platforms in the North Sea. By 1995, 60 percent of the airline had been bought by Hermann Løvenskiold.

In 1996, the company won the first public service obligation tender that was issued by the Ministry of Transport and Communications. Starting 1 August, Teddy Air started serving Fagernes Airport, Leirin, with routes to Oslo and Bergen. The contract gave a subsidy of NOK 23.7 million for three years, and was 15 percent lower than what Coast Air had been receiving. On 20 May 1997, Teddy Air started its first international route, from Stavanger to Gothenburg in Sweden.

After the 1998 opening of Oslo Airport, Gardermoen, which is located 50 kilometers (31 mi) north of Oslo, both Teddy Air and Guard Air announced they would start routes to the new airport. Both established six daily round trips—Teddy Air using an Embraer 110 and Guard Air using a Dornier 228. The new airport would make driving to the Oslo Airport about an hour longer from Grenland, and both airlines hoped to create a feeder service. Teddy Air withdrew from the route after one month, after having lost more than NOK 1 million.

In February 1999, Air Stord filed for bankruptcy. On 21 February, Teddy Air launched a route between Stord Airport, Sørstokken, and Oslo, using Saab 340 aircraft. This allowed four daily round trips during the week, and two on Sundays. Other airlines saw the route as attractive, and Coast Air launched eight daily round trips between the two airports. Teddy Air was soon forced to withdraw from the route, after it was unable to make any profits from it. The Fagernes routes were lost from 1 August 1999, when the contract was won by Widerøe.

=== Virtual airline ===
Following the steep decline in routes, the company was reorganized into a virtual airline in 1999. All operations were taken over by the Swedish airline Golden Air, who would operate the Saab 340 aircraft. At the same time, Golden Air bought half of Teddy Air. In October, Coast Air announced that they had too few aircraft to continue flying from Stord, and would terminate operations. Teddy Air became the only airline to serve Stord. 1999 returned a loss of NOK 6.9 million. In 2004, Teddy Air terminated all services. The contract with Golden Air was discontinued, and the hangar at Geiteryggen was sold. The company remained on paper until 2005, when the equity was gone and the entity was dissolved.

== Destinations ==
The following is a list of destinations served by Teddy Air:

City	Country	Airport	Start	End
Bergen	Norway	Bergen Airport, Flesland	1995	2004
Fagernes	Norway	Fagernes Airport, Leirin	1996	1999
Gothenburg	Sweden	Gothenburg City Airport	1997	1999
Oslo	Norway	Oslo Airport, Fornebu	1990	1998
Oslo	Norway	Oslo Airport, Gardermoen	1998	1998
Skien	Norway	Skien Airport, Geiteryggen	1990	2004
Stord	Norway	Stord Airport, Sørstokken	1999	1999
Stavanger	Norway	Stavanger Airport, Sola	1993	2004
