= Certification Review item =

Aviation document

Certification Review Item (CRI) is a document describing an item that requires disposition prior to the issuance of Type Certificate (TC), change to TC approval or Supplemental Type Certificate (STC) by European Union Aviation Safety Agency (EASA).

This document could for example contain specific justification and/or agreed deviations from a guideline for certification.

Federal Aviation Administration (FAA) stands that EASA/JAA use CRIs for the same reason FAA use issue papers. They document a certification or validation subject that requires an interpretation to be clarified, or that represents a major technical or administrative problem. EASA/JAA use CRIs for significant or controversial regulatory, technical policy, and means of compliance issues. Routine items in showing compliance and work relationships will not normally be raised as a CRI unless special circumstances exist.

== See also ==
- Certification
- Airworthiness certificate
- Unapproved aircraft part
- Experimental aircraft
