= Skien Airport, Geiteryggen =

Skien Airport, Geiteryggen Skien flyplass, Geiteryggen
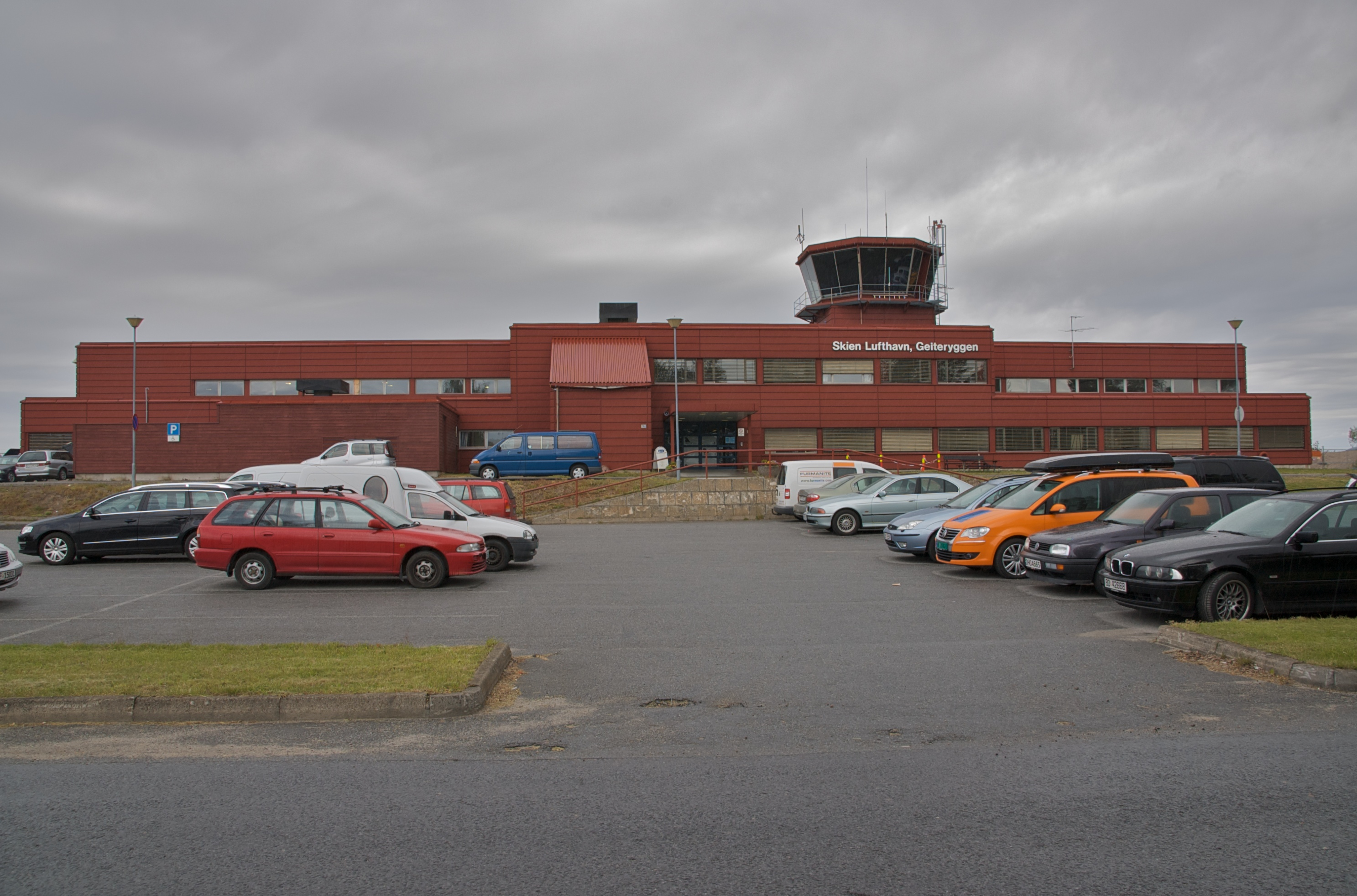
- IATA: SKE; ICAO: ENSN

Summary
- Airport type: Public
- Owner: Skien Municipality
- Operator: Grenland Luftsportssenter (GLSS)
- Serves: Skien, Telemark, Norway
- Location: Geiteryggen, Skien
- Elevation AMSL: 141 m (463 ft)
- Coordinates: 59°11′06″N 009°34′01″E

Map
- Location in Norway

Runways
Direction	Length		Surface
Direction	m	ft	Surface
01/19	1,416	4,646	Asphalt

Statistics (2014)
- Passengers: 33,080
- Aircraft movements: 7,108
- Cargo (tonnes): 0

Skien Airport, Geiteryggen (Norwegian: Skien flyplass, Geiteryggen; IATA: SKE, ICAO: ENSN) is a regional airport located at Geiteryggen, 5.5 kilometers (3.4 mi) southwest of the center of the town of Skien in Skien Municipality, Norway. Owned by Skien Municipality, it was last served by Widerøe with daily flights to Bergen. The runway is 1,416-by-30-meter (4,646 ft × 98 ft) and numbered 01–19. The airport had 33,080 passengers in 2014 and has Grenland and the southern part of Telemark county as its catchment area.

The airport was built with a 650-meter (2,130 ft) gravel runway in 1952. Fjellfly was the first airline based at the airport, which from 1963 to 1972 flew scheduled services to Oslo. An extension of the runway to 1,050 meters (3,440 ft) was carried out in 1970s. Norving had a base at Geiteryggen from 1976, which was taken over by Norsk Air in 1988. A major upgrade, including expanding the runway to the current length and building the current terminal, took place in the mid-1980s. Norsk Air withdrew in 1993, resulting in several airlines flying from the airport; Coast Aero Center, Teddy Air, Coast Air, Air Stord and Sun Air of Scandinavia all operated various services during the late 1980s and 1990s. The airport closed in 2002, but was reopened in 2004 when Vildanden was established. It gradually introduced four domestic and international services before folding in 2011.

== History ==
=== Establishment ===
The first aircraft to visit Skien was an air show held by Pierre Chanteloup at Gråtenmoen in Solum Municipality (just west of the town of Skien) in 1914. Other aviators used Gråtenmoen for flights from 1918. The first plans for a permanent airport in Grenland was proposed by Norsk Hydro in 1928, during the planning of their industrial facility at Herøya. At a meeting in on 12 January 1934, hosted by Skien Chamber of Commerce, Hjalmar Riiser-Larsen, chief aviator in the newly established Norwegian Air Lines, recommended that an airport be built in Skien. The lecture spurred municipal and commercial interest in an airport, and within days there were carried out investigations of possible sites, notably Gråtenmoen, Vallermyrene and Geiteryggen.

The municipal lot at Gråtenmoen was selected by the appointed municipal airport committee. Engineer Grøndahl designed a proposal for the airport, which included three runways: a 1,000-meter (3,300 ft) long main runway, and two 650-meter (2,130 ft) crosswind runways. The plans were completed in January 1935 and in 1936 the airport committee held meetings with among others Minister of Labor Ole Monsen Mjelde. By 1936 the Aviation Council was brought into the discussions, and they recommended that the airport be located at Skogplassene. This was opposed by local politicians, who instead proposed Geiteryggen. Their main concerns were that Geiteryggen would be cheaper to purchase and would creating more work. However, the initial proposals were rejected by the minister because they were not accurate enough. The final selection of Geiteryggen was taken at a public meeting on 30 November 1936, which included representatives from Parliament.

World War II terminated plans for a civilian airport. The chamber of commerce resumed work on the airport plans in 1946 and initiated contact with the airlines. At the same time the municipal airport committee was re-established and continued working with the plans to build at Geiteryggen, where a lot was provided free of charge for the airport. The aviation club Grenland Flyklubb was established in May 1946 and bought a Piper J-3 Cub. It used fields at Vallermyrene as an airfield during summer, the iced Gunnekleivfjorden and Børsesjø during winter, as well as Tønsberg Airport, Jarlsberg. Proposals for a water aerodrome in Vollsfjorden were stopped because of lack of floats. Grenland's first airline was Telemark Flyselskap, which was founded by Sigvard Nicolaisen in 1947 and at first operated a single Piper Cub.

The runway and original facilities at Geiteryggen were built by the aviation club and cost 30,000 Norwegian krone (NOK). At the time it consisted of a 650-meter (2,130 ft) gravel runway. The first landing at Geiteryggen took place on 7 February 1952. Initially only the aviation club and its Piper Cub used the airport. Fjellfly was established in 1954 and was based at Geiteryggen from the following year. It flew a daily newspaper services to bring Dagbladet from Oslo to Skien. The first air show took place on 15 May 1960s and drew a crowd of 8,000.

Operation of the airport was transferred to Fjellfly, but remained owned by the municipality. The airline took delivery of a Scottish Aviation Twin Pioneer in 1963 and the following year established a scheduled service to Oslo Airport, Fornebu. Fjellfly was the only Norwegian airline to operate the Twin Pioneer, which was chosen because it was the only aircraft with a capacity of sixteen passengers able to land on the short strip. At its peak in 1965, Fjellfly operated fourteen aircraft. A scheduled services from Skien via Sandefjord Airport, Torp and Oslo to Hamar Airport, Stafsberg was established from 2 May 1967. The runway was extended to 1,050-meter (3,440 ft) and paved in 1970. This allowed Fjellfly to take deliver of a de Havilland Heron for use on their service. Mey-Air showed interest in operating out of Skien in early 1972. Fjellfly went bankrupt in 1972 and Mey-Air withdrew their interest in the routes.

=== Norving era ===
Following an initiative from the municipality, the Kirkenes-based airline Norving announced in January 1975 their intention to operate between Geiteryggen and Oslo and establish a base at Geiteryggen. In July, a contract was signed between the municipality and Norving in which Norving was responsible for operating the airport, including manning the tower and fire service for an annual NOK 125,000 compensation and would operate the service to Fornebu for a minimum of one year. In exchange, the municipality would upgrade the airport. Operation of the route itself would not receive subsidies. Several airlines based in Southern Norway made official complaints to the ministry, largely based on it being unfair for an airline based in Northern Norway to operate a route in Southern Norway. Thus followed concession applications from Partner Air Service, a joint venture between Fjordfly, Norsk Flytjeneste and Paralift Air Service.

Norving's concession was granted in January 1976 and was the first time a formal taxi route concession was granted in Norway. This limited the capacity to ten passengers, but unlike a regular concession, the airline did not have an obligation to fly the route. Operations started on 3 May 1976 with two daily round trips using an eight-passenger Britten-Norman Islander. By September, the airline was making 22 round trips and the following month the airline ordered a ten-passenger Cessna 404 Titan to increase capacity. By May 1977, the route had 1167 monthly passengers, five daily round trips Monday through Friday.

In early 1976, Norving launched plans for a taxi route between Stavanger Airport, Sola and Skien. It was protested by Haugesund-based Nordsjøfly, who had started linking Haugesund to Stavanger and Bergen, and did not want another regional airline in Rogaland. Both airlines had their applications rejected by the ministry. When the contract to operate Skien Airport was to be renewed in 1978, a local political debate broke out regarding whether the municipality should be subsidizing the airport all the time there was a train service to the capital. The contract was renewed and Norving continued to take advantage of both a free hangar and no landing fees. Following a twenty percent growth on the Oslo–Skien route in 1978, Norving applied to increase the size of the aircraft to twenty passengers. The application was rejected by the ministry on the grounds that taxi routes were limited to ten-passenger aircraft. In 1979, the route had 14,000 passengers.

In October 1979, Norving started a route taxi service between Skien and Kristiansand Airport, Kjevik. Norving made an interlining agreement to allow passengers on the Skien to Kristiansand route to transfer to Scandinavian Airlines System's Copenhagen flight, but low patronage caused the route was terminated in February 1981. Norving applied in the early 1980s for a concession on the route from Skien to Stavanger. This was granted on the condition the airline have a stopover at Farsund Airport, Lista. Norving started their route in May with two daily round trips using a Cessna 441 Conquest.

Discussions of expanding the runway had been carried out since the 1970s, but the issue had stranded as no-one was willing to finance the venture. Skien Municipal Council wanted the municipalities of Porsgrunn and Bamble, and Telemark County Municipality to assist in the financing. A route was started by Norving to Bergen in 1984. A government report on the airport structure, published in April, down-prioritized Skien Airport, although it permitted state grants for an upgrade. An agreement was also made between Skien, Porsgrunn, Bamble and the county. The upgrades allowed Norving to start operating the Dornier 228 at Geiteryggen, following improvements to the runway and instrument landing system. From 1985 they also started using the Saab 340 on Skien flights. From 1986 Norving started flights to Trondheim Airport, Værnes and Göteborg Landvetter Airport.

A major upgrade to the airport took place in 1985. The runway was extended to 1,400 meters (4,600 ft), a new terminal building was constructed and Norving built a new hangar with space for three Saab 340. The ownership of the airport was transferred to an inter-municipal enterprise owned by Skien Municipality (40%), Porsgrunn Municipality (30%), Bamble Municipality (10%) and Telemark County Municipality (10%). The official opening took place in June 1987, following investments of NOK 50 million. That year the airport had 60,000 passengers. Norving's Skien-based operations were bought by Norsk Air in 1988. Norsk Air was based at Sandefjord Airport and initially intended to operate out of both airports. The airline was bought by Widerøe in 1989 and Widerøe decided to continue operations at both Torp and Geiteryggen for a year to see where to establish its base.

=== Rapid change of airlines ===
Coast Aero Center received permission to fly from Stord Airport, Sørstokken via Skien to Oslo in 1987. It originally operate a ten-seat Beechcraft Super King 200, but quickly went over to the larger de Havilland Canada DHC-6 Twin Otter. Permission was granted in 1988 to operate direct flights from Stord to Oslo, and the service to Skien was dropped.

Teddy Air was established in 1989 and began services from Skien to Fornebu the following year, initially using a Britten-Norman Islander. There was a lot of local opposition to the airline, and several local businesspeople claimed that it would be better if Norsk Air was awarded the contract, or Skien Airport was closed and locals instead used Sandefjord Airport. Norsk Air stated that it would not be possible for them to make money on the Skien–Oslo route; Widerøe chose to operate out of Sandefjord and from 1993 closed its operations at Geiteryggen. Teddy Air subsequently took over the Stavanger route, using an Embraer 110, while the Bergen route was granted to Air Stord, despite Teddy Air having applied for the concession. Coast Air was also awarded a concession on the route to Bergen.

The domestic aviation market was deregulated in 1994 and Teddy Air stated competing with Air Stord on the Bergen route. Air Stord flew 31 flights per week, compared to the 16 offered by Teddy Air. For a brief period in 1996, Sun Air of Scandinavia operated a service to Copenhagen Airport. Fornebu was replaced by Oslo Airport, Gardermoen in 1998, which increased driving time from Grenland to the national airport with an hour. Two airlines each established six daily round trips—Teddy Air using an Embraer 110 and Guard Air using a Dornier 228. Teddy Air withdrew from the route after one month and Air Stord went bankrupt in 1999. The same year Teddy Air was reorganized as a virtual airline and flights were taken over by Golden Air, who would operate the Saab 340. Teddy Air terminated all services in 2004 and the hangar at Geiteryggen was sold.

=== Vildanden era ===
Skien Airport had been taken over by Skien Municipality and was receiving annual subsidies of NOK 2.5 million from the municipality and NOK 3.8 million from the state. The closure of Teddy Air's services, combined with improved services from Torp, caused the airport to close in 2002. Vildanden was founded on 23 November 2004 by 18 local investors who wanted to resume commercial scheduled flights from Skien Airport. In October 2004, a contract was signed with Coast Air, who would operate a Jetstream 31 aircraft between Skien and Bergen. Following the announcement from Vildanden and Coast Air, the municipality decided to reopen the airport, and cover the estimated NOK 300,000 annual deficit, as well as upgrade the control tower for NOK 700,000. The operation of the flights were taken over by Danish Air Transport in October 2005, using an ATR 42.

At the same time, the municipal council was considering the future of the airport. The city engineer estimated it would need a subsidy of NOK 2 million in 2006, and the politicians, who wanted the airport to run without subsidies, demanded that Vildanden guarantee for the deficit. This was rejected by Vildanden—on the contrary, the company was in dire need for more capital to keep operating. During 2006, the ridership increased, and Vildanden started becoming more aggressive against Widerøe, which was flying to Bergen from Sandefjord Airport. Vildanden stated that they aimed to outperform Widerøe on price to Bergen. The operations were taken over by Avitrans in October 2006. This included a second aircraft, allowing the airline to start operations to Stavanger and Molde Airport, Årø in 2007. From 18 March, Vildanden also started three weekly departures from Skien to Stockholm-Skavsta Airport. The route was necessary to transport personnel from Avitrans' hub at Bromma to Skien.

By October 2007, Vildanden was in severe financial distress. An agreement was made with the municipal council where the latter gave a credit loan to the airline. The route to Molde had given large deficits and the company was forced to close it down. NOK 2.3 million, equal to the airlines debt to the airport, was granted to the municipal-owned airport operator, and the company allowed to make an agreement where half the debt was deleted, and the other half made interest and principal-free for two years. In exchange, the management of Vildanden had to raise new capital equal to at least half the companies accounts payable, which was NOK 8 million. The case raised local debate about whether it was the municipality's job to subsidize the airport and the airline. The Federation of Norwegian Aviation Industries announced that they would consider reporting the subsidies to the European Free Trade Association Surveillance Authority (ESA) for violation of the European Community competition law.

The municipal council voted on 19 June 2008 to not give further subsidies to the airport. Upgrades for NOK 8 million were needed to meet safety standard. The airport operator had debt of NOK 12 million, and no realizable assets. Vildanden was under certain conditions willing to pay some of the capital needed to perform the upgrades. The municipal council changed their opinion and voted—with a single decisive vote—to keep the airport running in July. The financial risk would be taken over by the municipal-owned Kontorbygg, who operate a range of offices and commercial buildings in Skien. The proposal was supported by the right-winged parties, and opposed by the socialist parties, as well as the chair of Kontorbygg. As a response, the Federation of Norwegian Aviation Industries reported the municipality to ESA, and demanded that NOK 20 million in illegal subsidies be repaid by Vildanden and the airport operator.

Vildanden terminated its agreement with Aviatrans in April 2009, with the intention of using larger aircraft. In July, an agreement was made with DAT to operate an ATR 42 on the Bergen route. From 1 August, the Stockholm route was terminated. During the winter of 2008–09, Vildanden was forced to land at Sandefjord Airport fifty times due to weather closing Geiteryggen. In March, Widerøe started a marketing campaign to attract people from Grenland to use their routes at Torp. Local Liberal Party politician Gustav Søvde stated that he was opposed to Widerøe advertising in the Telemark press for their services.

By October 2009 Vildanden owed Kontorbygg NOK 1.5 million in airport fees. Kontorbygg stated that if Vildanden did not pay, the airport would have to file for bankruptcy. Kontorbygg stated that the operation of Geiteryggen had cost the municipality NOK 50 million in the course of the five years Vildanden had been operating from it. In February 2010, the Municipality of Skien announced that it required Vildanden to pay back the NOK 3.1 million, plus NOK 200,000 in interest, that they borrowed in 2007. The loan was renewed in March, after Vildanden paid NOK 385,000. From 16 August, Helitrans took over as the operator, using an ATR 42. From 6 September the company started with flights to Trondheim. The company ceased operations after its last flight on 14 January 2011.

=== Widerøe era ===
Both Danish regional airline Danish Air Transport (DAT) and Widerøe announced by the end of January 2011 routes to Bergen. DAT started services with the ATR 42 on 14 February while Widerøe started with their Dash 8-100 on 28 March. DAT later also introduced services to Stavanger, but from March 2012 terminated their route to Bergen. A little more than a year after DAT terminated the Bergen service, in May 2013, they also ceased operation on the Stavanger route. In June 2015, Widerøe terminated their Bergen route as well, leaving Skien without scheduled services.

== Facilities ==
Skien Airport is located at Geiteryggen in Skien. The airport is owned by Skien Municipality and is operated by Skien Lufthavn, a limited company owned by the municipality, which employs 16 people. The air traffic control, consisting of an aerodrome flight information service, receives subsidies of NOK 6 million per year from the Ministry of Transport and Communications. The airport has permission and facilities to handle international flights. The terminal has a café. There are several hangars at the airport, one used by Danish Air Transport, one by Pegasus Helicopter, one by Grenland Flyklubb and one used by various private owners of aircraft.

The airport has a catchment area covering Grenland and surrounding parts of southern Telemark and eastern parts of Aust-Agder, with a total population of 140,000. The airport is located next to National Road 36 and there is free parking and taxis are available at the terminal. Skien Airport is located 5.5 kilometers (3.4 mi) and a 7-minute drive from the city center.

== Airlines and destinations ==
Effective 29 June 2015, there are no scheduled flights.

General aviation activities at the airport includes several aviation clubs, including Grenland Flyklubb, which operates three aircraft, the parachute club Grenland Fallskjermklubb and base for Russian Warbirds of Norway, which operates heritage Russian military aircraft.

== Accidents and incidents ==
- On 12 May 1953, a Noorduyn Harvard of the Royal Norwegian Air Force crashed during an emergency landing at Geiteryggen. The aircraft was on a mission out of Oslo Airport, Fornebu when it had run out of fuel and the pilot decided to land at Geiteryggen. During the landing the wheels cut into the gravel, causing the aircraft to flip. The pilot was not injured and the aircraft was repaired.
- On 11 October 1985, a Cessna 441 Conquest crashed close to Farelva during approach to Geiteryggen. The single occupant was killed immediately in the crash.
- On 2 April 1987, a Beechcraft King Air crashed minutes before a scheduled landing at Geiteryggen. The pilot and nine passengers from Hannover, Germany, were all killed.

== Sources ==
- Melling, Kjersti (2009). Nordavind fra alle kanter (in Norwegian). Oslo: Pilotforlaget.
- Tjomsland, Audun (2005). Høyt spill om Torp (in Norwegian). Sandefjord: Tjomsland Media. ISBN 82-997212-0-2.
- Olsen, Bjørn (1999). Telemark i norsk luftfarts historie (in Norwegian). Skau. ISBN 82-7976-002-4.
