= Stord Airport =

Stord Airport Stord lufthamn
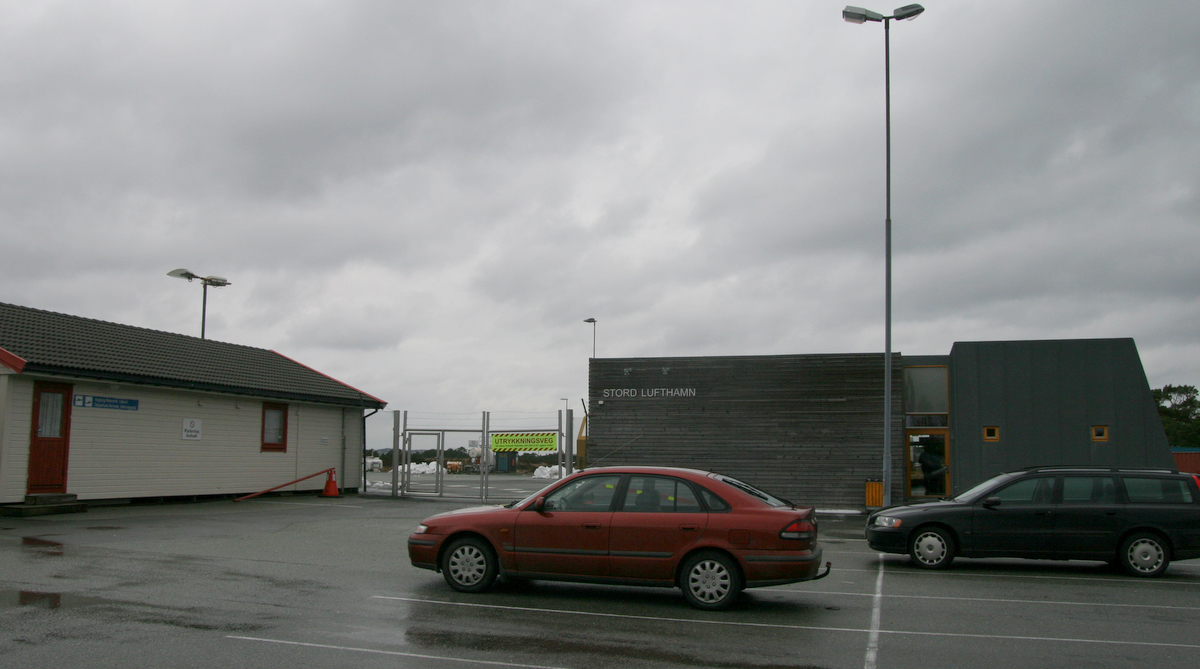
- Airport terminal
- IATA: SRP; ICAO: ENSO

Summary
- Airport type: Public
- Owner: Stord Municipality; Vestland County Municipality
- Operator: Sunnhordland Lufthavn
- Serves: Stord, Vestland, Norway
- Location: Sørstokken
- Elevation AMSL: 49 m / 161 ft
- Coordinates: 59°47′34″N 005°20′23″E
- Website: www.stordlufthamn.no

Map

Runways
Direction	Length		Surface
Direction	m	ft	Surface
14/32	1,460	4,790	Asphalt

Statistics (2014)
- Passengers: 37,936
- Aircraft movements: 3,538
- Cargo (tonnes): 11

Stord Airport (Nynorsk: Stord lufthamn; IATA: SRP, ICAO: ENSO) is a municipal regional airport located at Sørstokken in Stord Municipality in Vestland county, Norway. Located 13 kilometres (8 mi) from Leirvik and on the island of Stord, it is the only airport with scheduled services in Sunnhordland. The airport consists of a single asphalt 1,460-by-30-metre (4,790 ft × 98 ft) runway designated 14/32. It is classified as an airport of entry. Danish Air Transport operates up to three daily flights to Oslo Airport, Gardermoen. Previously the airport has been served by Coast Aero Center, Fonnafly, Air Stord, Teddy Air, Widerøe and Sun Air of Scandinavia.

Planning of the airport started in the 1950s, and after a proposal to locate it at Meatjørn was abandoned, it was decided built at Sørstokken. The airport opened on 25 October 1985. It received instrument landing system in 1986, which was also the first year with regular flights. The airport was originally both publicly and privately owned, but from 1991 it was taken over by Stord Municipality and Hordaland County Municipality. The runway was extended from 1,080 to 1,460 metres (3,540 to 4,790 ft) in 1996, and in 2001, a new terminal building was opened. From 2010, the airport receives state grants for operation. The airport has had two fatal accidents, including Atlantic Airways Flight 670.

== History ==
=== Planning ===
The first proposals for an airport on Stord—launched in the 1950s—envisioned an airport at Hystadmarka. In 1970, the municipal council applied the Ministry of Transport and Communications for permission and grants to build a regional airport. In addition to Hystadmarka, the municipality proposed building at Sørstokken and Langeland. The ministry rejected the application in 1972, stating that Stord was not a prioritized area for an airport. There was little political interest for an airport. The same year, an airport committee was established, led by Hans A. Isaksen, director of Stord Verft. After hiring Norconsult as advisor, it concluded that Sørstokken was the most suited location. However, by the time Stord's 1976 general area plan was being considered, the airport had fallen out and was only mentioned in a comment.

Following the decline in the shipyard industry in 1973 and 1974, the yards in Stord started a processes to move their attention to the offshore petroleum industry. The companies stated that to achieve this, they needed an airport in town. In 1978, a group organized by the industry presented a proposal for an airport to the municipal council. By then the Norwegian Civil Aviation Administration had made a report about Sørstokken, which recommended that the airport be built with an 800-by-60-metre (2,620 by 200 ft) runway, which was standard for municipal regional airports. The report stated building a 1,200-metre (3,900 ft) long runway was fully possible, and wind conditions in the area were good, with little fog.

The municipal chief-of-administration concluded that there would be need for an airport in Stord, but stated that the municipality lacked funds. As a first step, the municipal council approved making an area plan for the airport. Three of twenty-four councilors voted against in July 1978, stating that the airport would have an unacceptable impact on nature, that there were good ferry routes to the primary airports in Bergen and Haugesund, and questioned whether the municipality could afford to operate the airport. When the plan was published for consultative statements, several environmental groups protested; for instance, Nature and Youth stated that a heliport would suffice. The Norwegian Public Roads Administration also protested, as the airport could be in conflict with a planned floating bridge across Stokksundet. The price also escalated after it became clear that a new road would have to be built to the airport.

A new report was published in 1981, which recommended that the airport be located at Meatjørn or Storavatnet. This received protests because of the locations' proximity to residential areas. The report foresaw the airport providing feeder services to Bergen Airport, Flesland and Stavanger Airport, Sola. The airport would have to be under municipal control, but could be built and run by private enterprise. Compared to Sørstokken, Meatjørn could only have a 1,000-metre (3,300 ft) long runway, but could use existing roads and a new fire station for the municipality could be co-located at the airport. Construction of an airport with an 800-metre (2,600 ft) runway was estimated to cost NOK 10 million for Meatjørn and NOK 16.5 million for Sørstokken, of which the road to the latter would cost NOK 7 million. In October 1981, a de Havilland Canada Twin Otter flown by Widerøe performed a simulated landing at Meatjørn.

In 1982, a proposal was launched to extend the runway to 1,600 metres (5,200 ft). At the time, all aircraft used in Norway either could land on an 800-metre (2,600 ft) long runway, or would need 1,600 metres (5,200 ft), so a compromise of 1,200 metres (3,900 ft) would have no practical application. The medium length would be possible at Meatjørn, but at Sørstokken, the runway lights would have to be placed in the fjord, which was too deep to make it feasible. When the issue was considered in the municipal council on 17 June 1982, the politicians voted unanimously for Sørstokken. There was no politician support to build an airport close to the residential areas, and those who were opposed to an airport voted for the most expensive proposal.

A new airport committee was established in March 1983, which had representatives from the large industrial companies and the municipalities of Stord, Bømlo and Fitjar. In May, the area plan for Sørstokken was unanimously approved by the municipal council. The limited company Sunnhordland Lufthavn A/S was established on 6 July 1983, owned one-seventh each by the three municipalities and four industrial companies: Aker Stord, Aker Elektro, Leirvik Sveis and VVS Stord. The company estimated the investment costs to NOK 25.5 million and stated that their immediate goal was to build an airport and not necessarily to initially establish scheduled services.

One-third of the necessary capital would be granted from private investors, one third from public grants and one third as loans. In December 1983, Stord Municipality granted NOK 3 million as share capital; an additional NOK 1.4 million was granted from Fitjar, Bømlo, Kvinnherad, and Tysnes municipalities, and the power company Sunnhordland Kraftlag. By mid-1984, the estimated cost of the airport had been reduced to NOK 19 million. The four owner companies invested NOK 6.5 million in the airport company. The company started the process of purchasing the 16.7-hectare (41-acre) area needed for the airport and roadway. The company offered NOK 750,000, but the land owners asked for NOK 1,020,000. The expropriation process was taken over by the municipality; in the municipal council the Socialist Left Party voted against the expropriation, stating that they did not want to take over the land until the financing of the airport was completed. A Stone Age settlement was found in the route for the road, which would have to be excavated.

=== Construction ===
In September 1984, the Ministry of Finance granted NOK 8 million to the airport. The decision to build the airport was taken by the airport company on 19 October 1984, who at the same time signed the construction contract with Engelsens Ettf. Entreprenør. The airport was to receive a 1,080-metre (3,540 ft) long runway. The estimated price for the road and airport was NOK 20 million, and construction started with the road on 1 November. The contract stipulated that the airport should be completed by 1 November 1985. In November 1984, the final legal issues with the land-owners were settled. The area was increased to 20.2 hectares (50 acres), costing the municipality NOK 1.05 million. The construction work involved the blasting of 140,000 cubic metres (4,900,000 cu ft) of rock and the removal of 50,000 cubic metres (1,800,000 cu ft) of topsoil.

Construction of the airport consisted of a 1,080-metre (3,540 ft) long runway, aligned 15–33, which included a 40-metre (130 ft) long turning section at each end. The runway was paved 30 metres (98 ft) wide, with 15-metre (49 ft) wide shoulders. The runway received 30 edge lights placed every 60 metres (200 ft), in addition to 10 end lights at each end. The middle of the runway was located at 48.9 metres (160 ft) above mean sea level (AMSL), while the south end was at 47.25 metres (155.0 ft) AMSL and the north end 46.01 metres (151.0 ft) AMSL. The airport ramp was 45 by 96 metres (148 by 315 ft) and was connected to the runway via a 17.5-metre (57 ft) wide taxiway which had 2.5-metre (8 ft 2 in) wide shoulders. The access road was 5.5-metre (18 ft) wide and 2,360 metres (7,740 ft) long, with the airport featuring a 0.2 hectares (0.49 acres) parking lot. Along the road were laid water and sewer piper, and power and telecommunication lines.

On 5 March 1985, the airport company held a general meeting. It received NOK 7.18 million in increased share capital and 21 new owners, including increased share capital from Bømlo, Kvinnherad and Tysnes. The board had attempted to raise capital by marketing the airport as a "people's airport" and hoping that many locals would purchase shares, but the attempts failed. The airport cost NOK 17.2 million; as the company had NOK 17.9 million in share capital at the time, it was debt-free. The terminal building consisted of a two-story building 11 by 7 metres (36 by 23 ft), with the control tower in the second story. The building was built in five weeks. The opening took place on 25 October, but without any instrument landing system.

=== Coast Aero Center period ===
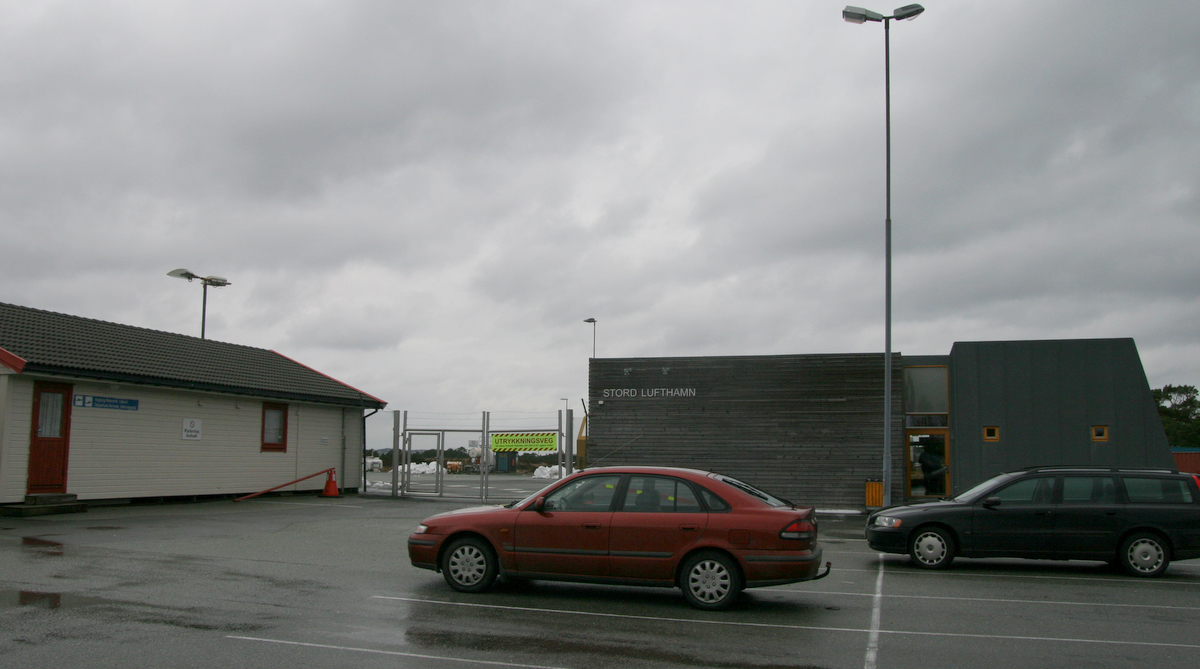
Land side of the terminal building

During construction, companies announced interest in using the airport. Fonnafly, a sea plane airline based in Kvinnherad, stated that they planned to establish a fleet of six to eight seat aircraft at Sørstokken. Haugesund Airport, Karmøy-based Coast Aero Center announced their intention to fly from Stord to Oslo Airport, Fornebu. Norving made a formal application to the Ministry of Transport and Communications to fly from Bergen Airport, Flesland via Sørstokken to Fornebu twice per day. Their estimates showed an average 36 passengers per year on the route from Stord to Oslo, and they planned to use Cessna 441 Conquest aircraft. The regional council recommended that the local company Fonnafly would be given the concession.

When the airport opened, it had not yet had its landing fees approved of by the authorities, and use of the airport was at first free. The airport did not have any scheduled flights, but Norsk Hydro operated a number of charter flights, mostly to Oslo, operated by Coast Aero Center. At first, the airport did not have any employees, so the snow clearance was done by the municipality. In early 1986, the airport's two first employees were hired, both working with flight information service. The airport had no rights for any state grants, so the company had to raise additional capital to cover operating expenses and pay the NOK 2.5 million the instrument landing system cost. In March 1986 the airport was granted NOK 1.5 from the Ministry of Finance to cover parts of the cost. The airport was set up with Category II, but lacked pulsating light approach slope indicator and approach lighting system.

After the opening of the airport, Widerøe also applied to operate the route. At the time, the ministry would select one company who would be granted a concessional monopoly on the route. The concession was granted to Coast Aero Center, which was permitted to operate to Bergen and Stavanger. The ministry stated that Fonnafly was not fully operational while Norving had stated that they could not make money without flying to Oslo. The reason the route to Oslo was dropped, was that there was insufficient capacity at Fornebu. After being rewarded the concession, Coast Aero Center started plans to build a hangar at Sørstokken. The route was set up to leave Stavanger in the morning and fly via Sørstokken to Bergen and then back; this was repeated in the afternoon and then a single round trip was flown from Stavanger to Sørstokken after the last evening plane from Oslo had landed in Stavanger.

Local politicians protested against not receiving a direct flight to Oslo. They succeeded in convincing Minister of Transport and Communications, Kjell Borgen, to establish a flight from Sørstokken via Skien Airport, Geiteryggen, to Fornebu. Three companies applied for the route: Coast Aero Center, Fonnafly and Norving. Hordaland County Municipality recommended Norving, as they were regarded as being able to give the best service, which was followed up by the ministry.

The instrument landing system was operational from 1 August 1986 and on 12 August Coast Aero Center started their two routes, using a ten-seat Beechcraft Super King 200 One week later, the ministry changed the concession for the Oslo and Skien route, so it was also awarded to Coast Aero Center. The service started on 24 October 1986. By November the Norwegian Civil Aviation Administration had approved the landing lights and other upgrades to the instrument system, which cost NOK 3.9 million, causing the airport to have to borrow money. It also bought a used fire engine from Sola. The need for transport was extra high on Monday morning and Friday afternoon, when weekly commuters were flown in. The airport lost NOK 668,000 in 1986.

In July 1987, a distance measurement in the distance measuring equipment failed, terminating all scheduled and night flights until it was replaced in September. The second half of 1987 also saw the expansion of the terminal with 130 square metres (1,400 sq ft), consisting of seven prefabricated modules. It included seating for 40 people, a cafeteria, facilities for pilots and offices for the airport's management, and customs and police facilities. The latter allowed the airport status as an international airport, which allowed charter flights to Sweden, Denmark and the United Kingdom, which were often done on a weekly basis by foreign companies involved in the heavy industry. However, the airport did not have status as a permanent border control facility and the airport therefore had to cover cost of these services themselves. The Ministry of Justice stated that the airport was too close to Flesland, Haugesund and Sola to have permanent status, but allowed the chief-of-police to give dispensations for individual flights from 1988. In 1987, the airport company lost NOK 2 million.

The airport company discussed plans to extend the runway and build a proper terminal building, and publicly proposed that the airport could take over some of the helicopter routes from Flesland to oil platforms in the North Sea. However, the airport lacks sufficient apron, duel storage, fire service and other safety measures which were required by the helicopter operators. In 1988, the county's chief of transport recommended that the county municipality give the airport top priority in its investment budget. He argued that the airport should be financed by the state, and that the state should give a grant to the airport the cost of building the runway, and that the airport company use the grants to extend the runway.

=== Air Stord period ===
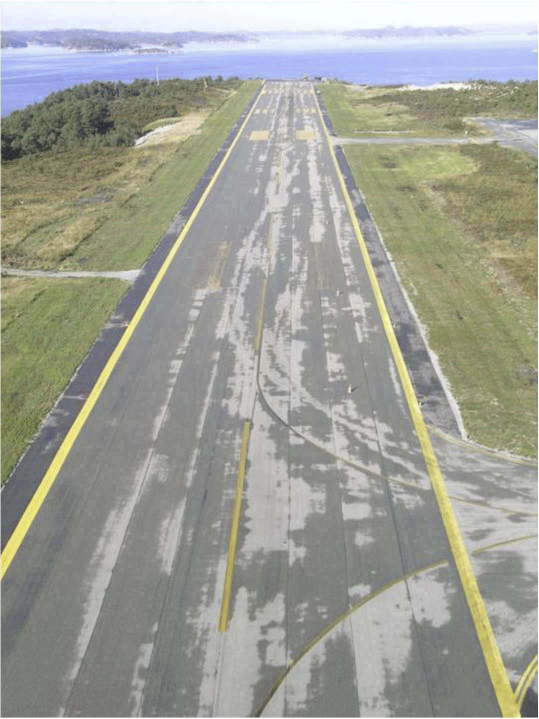
The runway

In February 1988, Coast Aero Center filed for bankruptcy. The company had not paid its airport fees for a while, and owed the airport company NOK 415,000. However, the company attempted to secure capital for further operations, and not until April did Coast Aero Center inform the Ministry of Transport that they would waive their concessions. Norving was also in financial difficulties, and was not able to operate a route. Jens Ulltveit-Moe tried to establish Moving by purchasing two Dornier 228 aircraft from Norving and taking over the Sørstokken concessions, but in the last minute a new board in Norving would not sell the aircraft. Widerøe offered to operate a route to Oslo, but required that the municipalities guarantee for the profitability of the route, something the municipalities were not willing to do. From 8 December 1988, after receiving concession from the ministry, Fonnafly started a route from Sørstokken to Oslo. A ticket cost NOK 1,100, NOK 700 more expensive than the cheapest tickets from Haugesund.

In the course of 1988, the airport company's debt increased from NOK 4.5 to 8.0 million. In mid-1989, Partnair bought 51 percent of Fonnafly. Three months later, Partnair filed for bankruptcy, but Fonnafly continued operations. Partnair was reestablished in January 1990, and the company took over Fonnafly's route from Sørstokken to Fornebu in February. The company was bought by Jon Furdal in May 1991, and from 27 July the company moved its main base from Haugesund to Sørstokken, including 14 employees and three aircraft. At the same time, the airline changed its name to Air Stord.

Furdal wanted the airport to have a longer runway so he could operate larger aircraft. An extension of 250 metres (820 ft) in the south end was estimated to cost NOK 9 to 10 million. By August 1991, Air Stord increased from two to four daily weekday flights to Fornebu, and from October increased to a fifth three days a week. The airport company was faced with severe liquidity issues, and the creditors threatened to file for bankruptcy from 1 December. To save the airport, the share capital was written down to zero, Stord Municipality and Hordaland County Municipality agreed to paid NOK 0.5 million in new share capital in the company and took over an ownership of 79 and 21 percent, respectively. In 1991, the airport company had a loss of NOK 5.2 million.

In early 1992, Air Stord started a route to Stavanger, which corresponded with the morning departures to London and Aberdeen in the United Kingdom. That year, the airport company went with NOK 22,320 million in profit, before financial costs. In June 1993 the airport bought a new fire engine, which allowed the airport to be upgraded from Category 3 to 4, allowing larger aircraft to land. In August, Air Stord's concessions were upgraded, so they were allowed use aircraft with more than ten seats, but were at the time required to not cancel flights without due reason. In October, the municipality and county granted NOK 300,000 to install new approach lights for Runway 15. In 1993, the airport had a revenue of NOK 3.6 million and a profit of NOK 13,414. This included a NOK 1.77 million grant from the state for the tower service.

In 1995, the airport was discussed in the Parliament of Norway's Standing Committee on Transport and Communications. The committee was split on whether it should nationalize the airport. The Labour Party and the Conservative Party, who had a majority in Parliament, wanting to wait until after the Triangle Link—a fixed link from Stord and Bømlo southwards to Haugaland—was built, so see how it affected patronage at Sørstokken. The Centre Party, the Socialist Left Party and the Christian Democratic Party wanted to nationalize the airport. A unanimous committee chose to give a NOK 1 million grant to build a new terminal and no longer require the airport to follow the Civil Aviation Administration's fees, allowing it to set its own.

In March 1995, Coast Air started flights from Sørstokken to Stavanger using a Twin Otter four times a week. However, the route did not have sufficient patronage and was terminated in June. In November 1995, Widerøe stated that they were willing to fly from Sørstokken to Oslo, in cooperation with Air Stord, using de Havilland Canada Dash 8 aircraft, with 37 or 50 seats. This would allow increased capacity without extending the runway. During March and April 1996, Sørstokken had its first regular helicopter flights, operated by Norsk Helikopter, as Aker had been contracted to dismount the oil platform at Odin. The company had to fly out personnel in the morning and take them back in the evening. On 20 May, Air Stord started using the 32-seat Dornier 328 aircraft on the route to Oslo.

=== Runway and terminal expansion ===
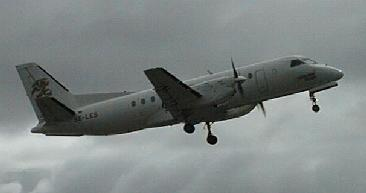
Teddy Air Saab 340 taking off from the airport in 1999

Since the construction of the airport, there had come new rules which required the runway to have a flat section 150 metres (490 ft) wide. Should the runway be extended, the regulations required the width be extended for the whole length of the runway. The airport established a committee to look into an expansion of the airport. It made to proposals to extend the runway: to 1,260 by 80 metres (4,130 by 260 ft) would cost NOK 9.2 million, while to 1,460 by 150 metres (4,790 by 490 ft) would cost NOK 22.4 million. For the longer plans, the runway would be extended 340 metres (1,120 ft) to the south and 40 metres (130 ft) to the north. The construction was offered for tender, and Veidekke offered to build the extension for NOK 8.5 million. The total cost of the project was NOK 15.2 million. The plans were approved by the municipal council on 22 February 1996, against the votes of the Socialist Left Party and the Christian Democratic Party. The project was financed by the Aker Group moving the municipality it taxed the work related to Stord from Oslo to Stord, on condition that it be used to extend the airport. The Socialist Left Party stated that it was undemocratic that a corporation dictate what its tax money be spent on.

Construction on the runway started on 13 May 1996. The work included an 85-square-metre (910 sq ft) new terminal building with a new border control. This was needed to allow up to 50 people to travel abroad on one flight, mostly foreign workers at Aker Stord. Hardanger Sunnhordlandske Dampskipsselskap started an airport coach service between Leirvik and the airport from 2 September 1996. The upgrades to the runway were taken into use on 7 November. Air Stord was in financial difficulties, and the airport company was forced to write off three-quarters of the company's NOK 750,000 debt, or see the airline file for bankruptcy. From 15 June, Widerøe started a Sunday route from Sandefjord Airport, Torp via Oslo to Sørstokken and then Flesland, before returning to Torp, using a Dash 8-100 aircraft. From January 1998, Coast Air started flights once a week from Skien Airport, Geiteryggen via Stavanger and Stord to Bergen, using a British Aerospace Jetstream.

In 1997, the airport started the process to install a doppler very high frequency omnidirectional range (DVOR) to aid navigation, which would cost NOK 800,000 used, plus NOK 400,000 for installation and construction of a road. The DVOR was operational from October 1998. The Norwegian Labour Inspection Authority instructed the airport company to improve the facilities for both employees and passengers, and in February 1997, the airport company decided to build a new passenger terminal and a new operations building for a combined cost of NOK 12 million. The new passenger terminal would be 754 metres (2,473.75 ft) in two stories, with the tower in four. Instead the airport chose a larger proposal, also designed by Svein Halleraker, which cost NOK 25 million.

With the opening of Oslo Airport, Gardermoen on 8 October 1998, Widerøe terminated its route, while Air Stord moved the Oslo routes from the then closed Fornebu to Gardermoen. That year saw 52,130 passengers travel through Sørstokken, an all-time record. On 19 February 1999, Air Stord filed for bankruptcy. The same afternoon, Teddy Air landed at Stord and operated a route using a 36-seat Saab 340. Coast Air did the same with a 19-seat Jetstream. Stord Flytransport also started flying, in cooperation with Air Iceland, using a 46-seat ATR 42. Coast Air had the best regularity, but withdrew from operations in the fall.

In 2000, local businesspeople proposed building a new airport in Sveio Municipality to replace both Karmøy and Sørstokken. The airport would be large enough to serve cargo aircraft of any size, which would allow it to be used for export cargo routes. As a response, representatives for Sørstokken stated that it would be possible to rebuild Sørstokken's runway to 2,500 metres (8,200 ft) for NOK 100 million, although this would change the direction of the runway.

The decreased traffic caused the airport to reduce the plans for the size of the new terminal, cutting it to 350 square metres (3,800 sq ft) and a cost of NOK 10 million. NOK 2 million was financed through an interest-free loan from the county. To save NOK 600,000 in conjuncture tax, it was decided that the terminal would be built by the municipality, as it would then be regarded as a public, rather than private, investment. In late 2000 and early 2001, Widerøe put in a Dash 8-100 with two weekly services to cater week commuters from Eastern Norway. From February 2001, Widerøe terminated the service, but the extra service was partially replaced with a Monday morning service to Oslo by Danish Air Transport, using an ATR 42. The new terminal was opened on 1 August 2001, having cost NOK 7 million. By that year, the patronage had fallen to 20,000. The tolled Triangle Link road to Haugesund opened in April 2001.

=== More operators ===
During the summer of 2002, Danish Air Transport offered flights to Aalborg in Denmark, using what would otherwise have been an empty return flight to its base, but it sold only less than half the seats. The airport's largest creditor was Stord Municipality, to whom it owed NOK 5.5 million. In December 2002, the airport company transferred the ownership of the real estate in exchange for the debt being wiped. Coast Air moved its technical base from Florø Airport to Sørstokken in April 2003, and in April started flights to Oslo using ATR 42 aircraft up to three times per day. There was not sufficient traffic for both airlines, and Coast Air terminated the route from June. In August the airline started flights on Friday and Sunday, but these were again terminated in March 2004. In 2004, Aker Stord started leasing British Aerospace 146-200 aircraft operated by Atlantic Airways. The airline also offered monthly charter flights to Vágar Airport on the Faeroe Islands.

Teddy Air terminated its operations on 17 August 2004, stating that they were not making any money on the routes, and had not at any point during the five years they had served the airport. Coast Air had available aircraft and started the route using an ATR 42. In 2005, the airport built an access road to the northern tip of the runway to allow better access for emergency vehicles, along with a roundabout at the terminal to allow better access for buses. The runway was at the same time leveled to a total width of 80 metres (260 ft). The three investments cost NOK 3.5 million. From 20 November 2007, Coast Air started with two weekly flights to Gdańsk Lech Wałęsa Airport in Poland, targeting Polish foreign workers. On 23 January 2008, Coast Air filed for bankruptcy. High costs made the owner Trygve Seglem lose faith in future profits. The company had lost more than NOK 100 million since 2001. It was Norway's fourth largest airline at the time. With the fall of Coast Air, Stord Airport was without any scheduled routes and income, and lost NOK 350,000 per month until a new service was in place. To secure operations, the company Stordfly was established to guarantee for the operations of a route between Sørstokken and Gardermoen. The company collected NOK 2.5 million in capital from local businesses, and used it to wet lease aircraft to operate the route. From 21 April, Golden Air started a temporary service, which remained until 4 July. From 11 August, Sun Air of Scandinavia, a British Airways franchise, operated the route using Dornier 328. The route took a pause during the summer of 2009, but from 10 August the route was again in service, this time operated with ATR 42 aircraft by Danish Air Transport.

From 2010, the airport received state grants of NOK 12 million. In February 2010, the Ministry of Transport and the airport signed an agreement for the grants to continue until at least 2014. Despite this, the airport ran into severe liquidity problems in October, and had to borrow NOK 12 million from its owners. This caused the owners to elect a new board, led by Dag Aksnes, former director of Flesland. Local politicians from the Democrats in Norway have proposed closing the airport because of the high subsidies needed from the municipality. With the Triangle Link road being toll-free from 2013, they feel Haugesund Airport will be close enough (it's 69 km).

The runway designation was changed from 15/33 to 14/32 during the 2010s, although the runway was not moved.

In connection with the pandemic 2020 the airport and the route went into financial troubles again, and the government did not want to procure the air route since Haugesund gives fast enough travel times Oslo-Stord. But the owners, the Vestland fylke and local municipality, want to have the airport, so they support the airport and procure the route. Haugesund is located in competing Rogaland fylke, whose airport also got financial troubles in COVID years, but their region will have to solve it. The car travel times to Bergen or Stavanger are much longer due to longer distance and ferries needed.

== Airlines and destinations ==
Airlines	Destinations
DAT	Oslo

== Accidents and incidents ==
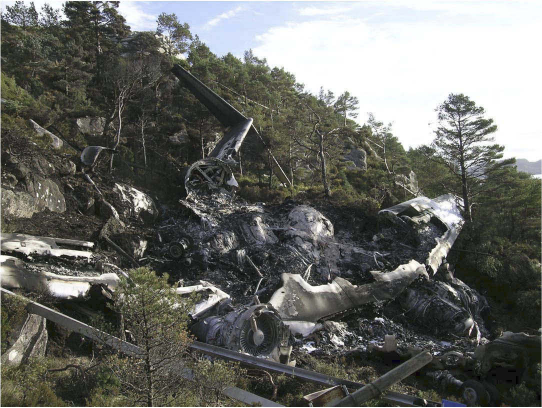
The crash site of Atlantic Airways Flight 670, north-west of the runway

- 13 March 1987: A Beech King Air of Partnair landed short of the runway after being subject to a sudden downdraft. None of the seven people on board were injured, although the plane was written off.
- 12 October 1998: A Cessna 402 from Jetair crashed during short final. The right engine was depleted for fuel and the captain was not able to compensate for this, losing control over the aircraft. All nine people on board were killed in the accident. There were no technical faults with the aircraft.
- 10 October 2006: at 07:32, Atlantic Airways Flight 670 crashed following a runway overrun of a British Aerospace 146-200A. The aircraft's spoilers failed to deploy, causing inefficient braking. The Atlantic Airways aircraft fell over the edge past the runway at slow speed and burst into flames, killing four of sixteen people on board. The investigation was not able to find the underlying cause of the spoilers malfunction. However, it found that disemployment of the anti-lock braking system caused hydroplaning and subsequent reduced braking ability. The damage was aggravated through a minimal safety zone surrounding the runway.

== Bibliography ==
- Resser, Tor (2005). Stord lufthamn Sørstokken (in Norwegian). Sunnhordland Lufthavn.
