= Partnair Flight 394 =

1989 aviation accident in the North Sea

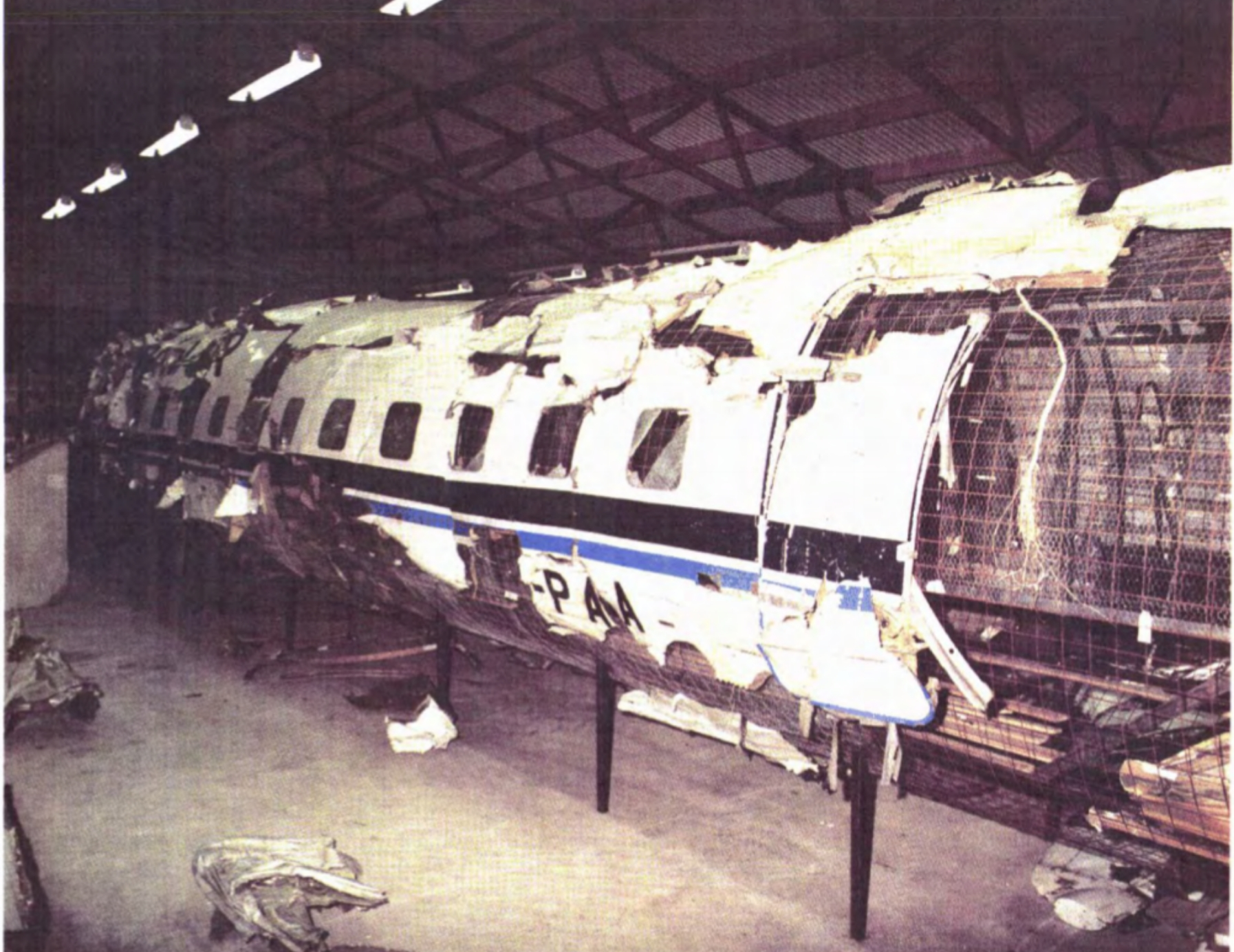
- The reconstructed wreckage of the aircraft

Accident
- Date: 8 September 1989
- Summary: Structural failure of rudder leading to loss of control and in-flight breakup, improper maintenance
- Site: 18 km (11 mi; 10 nmi) north of Hirtshals, Denmark 97 km (60 mi; 52 nmi) west of Tjörn, Sweden; 57°44′13″N 10°6′32″E

Aircraft
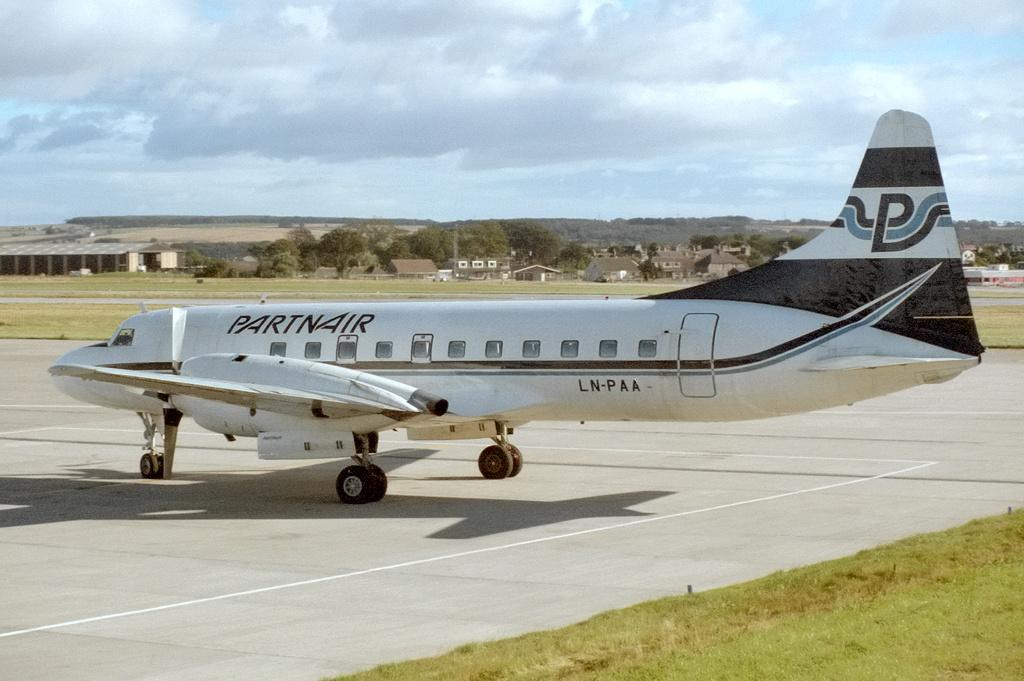
- LN-PAA, the aircraft involved in the accident, pictured in 1987
- Aircraft type: Convair CV-580
- Operator: Partnair
- IATA flight No.: PD394
- ICAO flight No.: PAR394
- Call sign: PARTNAIR 394
- Registration: LN-PAA
- Flight origin: Oslo Airport, Fornebu, Oslo, Norway
- Destination: Hamburg Airport, Hamburg, West Germany
- Occupants: 55
- Passengers: 50
- Crew: 5
- Fatalities: 55
- Survivors: 0

Partnair Flight 394 was a chartered flight that crashed on 8 September 1989 off the coast of Denmark, 18 kilometres (10 nautical miles) north of Hirtshals. All 55 people on board the aircraft died, making this the second-deadliest aircraft accident in Denmark after the 1945 crash of a Royal Air Force De Havilland DH.98 Mosquito in Copenhagen, which killed 125, and the deadliest accident involving a Convair CV-240 series. The accident was caused by improper maintenance and use of counterfeit aircraft parts.

== Aircraft and crew ==
The accident aircraft, registered as LN-PAA, was a 36-year-old Convair CV-580 operated by the Norwegian charter airline Partnair. The aircraft was first built in 1953 for United Airlines. Throughout its life it had changed owners several times with different registrations (N73128, EC-FDP, PK-GDS, HR-SAX, JA101C, N770PR, and C-GKFT), undergone various modifications, and had been rebuilt after a landing accident in 1978. The most significant modification was a change from piston to turboprop engines in 1960; this added more horsepower to the aircraft. In addition, the aircraft was not originally equipped with an auxiliary power unit (APU), but one was later added as an aftermarket modification and is relevant to this incident. The owner of the aircraft preceding its sale to Partnair was Kelowna Flightcraft, a Canadian company that specialized in servicing Convair aircraft. LN-PAA was one of the aircraft most recently acquired by Partnair. At the time of the accident, two other Convair 580s were in the Partnair fleet.

The flight crew consisted of Captain Knut Tveiten and First Officer Finn Petter Berg, both aged 59. Tveiten and Berg were close friends who had flown together for years. Both pilots were very experienced, with close to 17,000 successful flight hours each. Berg was also Partnair's flight operations manager.

== Background ==
At the time of the accident, Partnair was in financial difficulty. The airline's debts were such that, on the day of the accident flight, Norwegian aviation authorities had notified Norwegian airports to not allow Partnair aircraft to depart because the airline had not paid several charges and fees.

== Flight ==
Flight 394 was en route from Oslo Airport, Fornebu, Norway, to Hamburg Airport, West Germany. The passengers were employees of the shipping company Wilhelmsen Lines, who were flying to Hamburg for the launching ceremony of a new ship. Half of the employees of Wilhelmsen's head office were on board. Leif Terje Løddesøl, an executive of Wilhelmsen, said that the atmosphere in the company was "very, very good" prior to the accident flight and that some of the employees "maybe" had been to prior launching ceremonies, which he described as "quite exciting". A regular employee on the flight, one of the top-performing employees in Wilhelmsen, had been asked to give the speech during the ceremony. Løddesøl said that a "normal person" in the company was not often chosen to read the speech on such an occasion.

Before the flight, the Partnair crew found that one of LN-PAA's two main power generators was defective and had been so since 6 September. Also, the mechanic who had inspected the aircraft was unable to repair it. In the Norwegian jurisdiction an aircraft is only allowed to take off if it has two operable sources of power. Also, the aircraft's minimum equipment list required both main power generators to be operational. The minimum equipment list was not updated to reflect the addition of an auxiliary power unit (APU), however, Berg decided that he would run the APU throughout the flight so that the plane would have two sources of power after reviewing the minimum equipment list of a comparable aircraft and the emergency checklist.

Oslo Airport refused to let Flight 394 depart until a catering bill was paid. Before the aircraft took off, Berg left the cockpit to pay the catering company. As a result of this, the flight was delayed by almost an hour, finally departing at 15:59.

As Flight 394 passed over the water at its planned cruising altitude of 22,000 feet (6,700 metres), a Norwegian F-16 Fighting Falcon fighter jet passed by it. The F-16 pilot was startled by the sudden appearance of the aircraft and contacted Oslo air traffic control, believing his radar data to be false and that the aircraft was closer to his jet than his on-board computer had indicated.

As Flight 394 neared the Danish coastline, 22,000 feet over the North Sea, Copenhagen air traffic control saw that the plane was off course and falling quickly, appearing to crash into the sea, roughly 20 kilometres (11 nautical miles) north of the Danish coast.

== Investigation ==
Accident Investigation Board Norway (AIBN) investigated the disaster and recovered 50 of the 55 bodies before sending them through autopsies in Denmark. Investigators used side-scan sonar to plot positions of wreckage. The pieces had settled over an area two kilometres (1 1/4 mi) wide, leading the investigators to believe that LN-PAA disintegrated in the air. Luckily, 90% of the aircraft could be reconstructed.

In an accident flight, the cockpit voice recorder (CVR) usually records its final minutes. In the Partnair crash, however, it had recorded the start of the flight and stopped shortly before the aircraft took off. From the maintenance records, investigators found that ten years prior to Flight 394, the CVR's power supply had been rewired to connect to the aircraft's generator instead of its battery if full power was applied for takeoff. As the generator was inoperative on this flight, power to the CVR shut off as the aircraft departed.

Some initial speculation suggested that explosives brought down Flight 394. Indeed, the previous December, a bomb had brought down Pan Am Flight 103 over south-western Scotland. In addition, Norwegian Prime Minister Gro Harlem Brundtland had used that particular Partnair aircraft on her campaign trips, leading the Norwegian press to assume that the accident was an assassination attempt. Witnesses of the accident said that they heard a loud noise as they saw the aircraft fall. The fact that the aircraft had disintegrated in the air gave credibility to the bomb theory.

Speculation in the press later included a scenario where the plane had been shot down, possibly by the NATO war exercise "Operation Sharp Spear", which took place on the day of the accident flight near the flight path, as investigators had found small traces of high explosives on parts recovered from the sea bed. However, investigators found that the residue was not from a bomb or a warhead, as not enough of it was present. Finn Heimdal, an AIBN investigator, stated that the residue appeared to be more like a contamination than any other possibility. The sea had old munitions as many battles had been fought off the coast of Denmark. Investigators concluded that the aircraft pieces acquired residue from the bottom of the sea or that the traces of explosives were accumulated from contamination before the accident or due to storage.

Metallurgist Terry Heaslip of the Canadian company Accident Investigation and Research Inc. examined the aircraft skin from the tail and found signs of overheating, specifically that the skin had been repeatedly flexed, through a phenomenon known as flutter. This caused investigators to further scrutinize the tail of the Convair. Furthermore, the investigation team found that the APU, which was in the tail, generated heat, which melted certain plastic parts, indicating that the APU was operating during the flight even though it normally would not be. The mechanic who had inspected LN-PAA on the day of the accident flight told investigators that one of the aircraft's two main generators had failed and that he was not able to repair the faulty generator. The investigators discovered that the pilots had noted in the flight log that they would operate the APU throughout the flight because two power sources are required for departure. They also discovered that the APU's front mount was broken, which allowed it to vibrate excessively.

The two shroud doors on the aircraft tail were not present in the recovery. They were constructed with an aluminium honeycomb liner, and aluminium's reflective properties allowed the doors to appear on radar when floating free. This led the AIBN to conclude that the unidentified objects tracked at high altitude by Swedish radar for 38 minutes were likely the shroud doors, which had separated from the aircraft tail. From this, the AIBN found that the tail failed at 6,700 metres (22,000 ft). If the rudder moved in a violent manner, the weights behind the doors would also move violently and hit the shroud doors. Therefore, the rudder had made a violent movement as the accident unfolded.

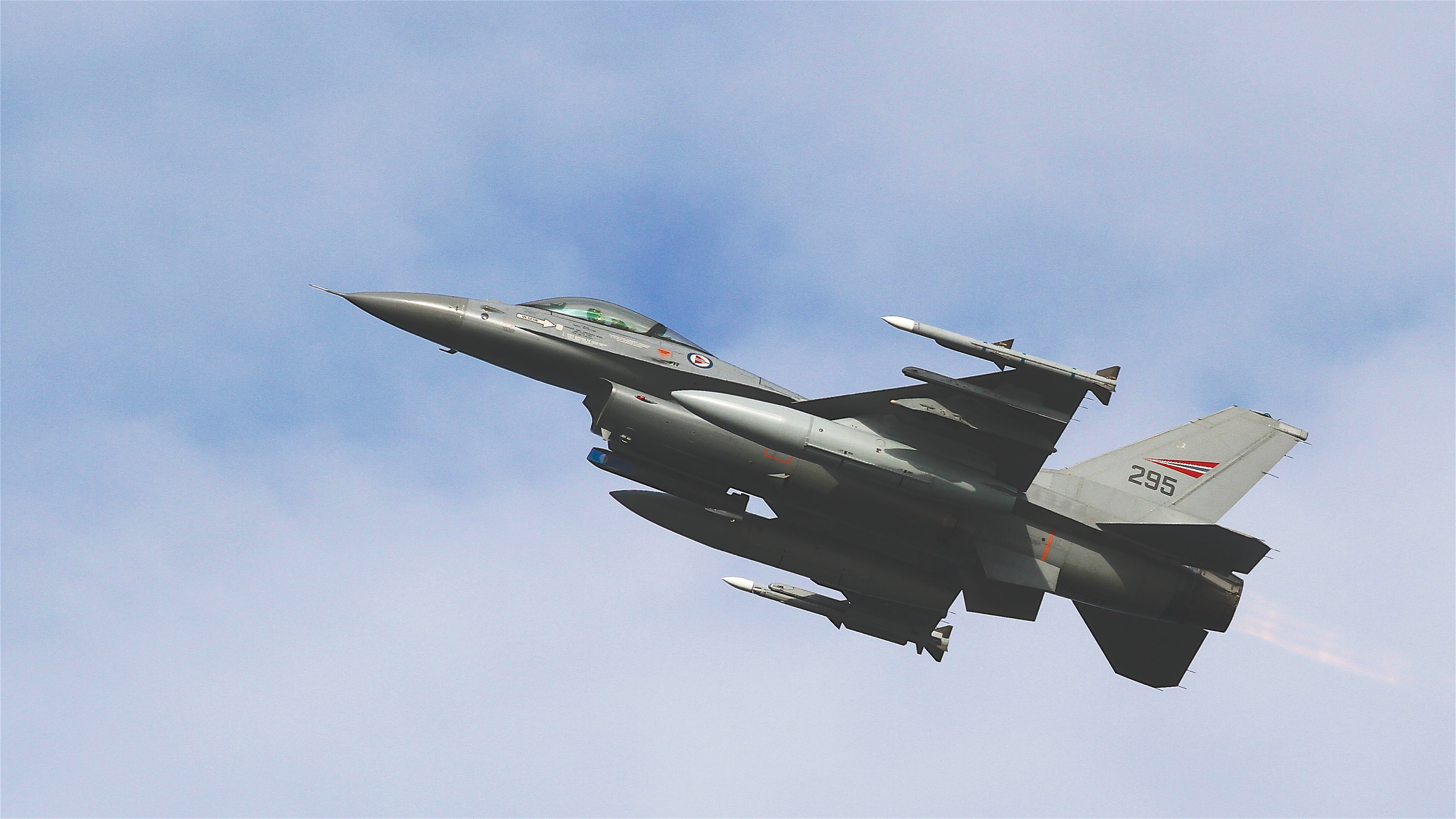
A Norwegian F-16 fighting falcon

Partnair suggested that the F-16 fighter jet had been flying at a faster velocity and closer to the Convair than reported in the media, reaching supersonic speed and creating a pressure wave that could have caused the Convair to disintegrate in midair. The National Aeronautical Research Institute, a Swedish aviation technology research facility, said that a 60% chance existed of this being the cause. The F-16 pilot testified that his aircraft was more than 1,000 ft (300 m) above the Convair. The investigators concluded that the jet would have had to have been within a few metres of the Convair to have affected the passenger aircraft in such a manner, and had found no evidence that the two aircraft had been so close. The AIBN investigation found no connection between the F-16 and the accident.

The Convair’s flight data recorder (FDR) was an antiquated analog model that used metal foil strips scratched by moving pins. Here, it did not record vertical acceleration readings and misrecorded heading indications. One needle recorded some lines twice, initially confusing the investigators, leading the team to send the FDR to Fairchild Industries who manufactured it. The manufacturer asked an ex-employee, the highest expert regarding the company's FDRs, to temporarily leave retirement to examine the recorder. The expert concluded that the needle supposed to have been recording the altitude had been shaking so much that it left other stray marks on the foil. This particular FDR recorded for hundreds of hours; further investigations found that the needle had been shaking abnormally for months. This told investigators that another component, not just the APU with the broken mount, had also been vibrating. The investigators charted the vibrations and found that two months before the accident, the vibrations stopped for two weeks, from immediately after the aircraft received a major overhaul in Canada by the airline's previous owner. During the Canadian company's test flights of the aircraft and its first several passenger flights for Partnair, the FDR recorded almost no abnormal vibrations. A review of the maintenance records of the aircraft revealed that during the overhaul, the mechanic discovered wear on one of the four bolts that held the vertical fin and fuselage together and replaced it. The vibrations stopped after the one bolt, with its associated sleeves, was replaced. When the vibrations later returned, they steadily increased until the accident flight.

After investigators recovered all four bolts, sleeves, and pins, they found that the bolt and parts installed by the Canadian firm were properly approved equipment, but the other three bolts and their parts were counterfeit and were incorrectly heat-treated during manufacturing. Those bolts each could bear only about 60% of their intended breaking strength, making them less than practical to use on the aircraft. The fake bolts and sleeves wore down excessively, causing the tail to vibrate for 16 completed flights and the accident flight.

The investigators concluded that eventually, the broken APU mount and the weak bolts holding the tail meant that both pieces were vibrating, and these vibrations reached the same frequency and went into resonance, where the force of multiple same-frequency vibrations add to that of one another and create one large vibration. Thus, the tail's vibration increased in amplitude until it failed and broke off.

== Aftermath ==
As a result of the accident being caused by fraudulent parts, the United States introduced reforms to the aircraft parts industry, and there was a period of more aggressive enforcement against counterfeit parts providers. Mary Schiavo, the Inspector General of the United States Department of Transportation from 1990 to 1996, oversaw investigations leading to over 150 criminal convictions and over $47 million in restitutions and fines under the Suspected Unapproved Parts (SUP) program. Nevertheless, the SUP program was cancelled in 2007.

The crash of Flight 394 was the final blow for the airline, which filed for bankruptcy on 11 October of the same year.

== Dramatization ==
The accident was featured in season seven of the internationally distributed Canadian made documentary series, Mayday, in the episode entitled "Blown Apart".

== Maps ==
Location of the accident and the airports	Accident site in Denmark
