= Unapproved aircraft part =

Aircraft parts not approved by civil aviation authorities

Unapproved aircraft parts are aircraft parts not approved by civil aviation authorities for installation on type certified aircraft.

For example, the Federal Aviation Administration (FAA) defines a "standard part" as a part produced in accordance with government regulations, and it defines an "approved part" as a "standard part" that is in accordance with a specific set of criteria and specifications. The FAA standards for approved parts are in FAR 21.305. In the United States parts may be approved through a Parts Manufacturer Approval (PMA), with type certification procedures through approval from the agency's approval, through Technical Standard Orders (TSOs), and from conforming to recognized specifications from the aviation industry.

Parts manufactured without an aviation authority's approval are described as "unapproved"; they may be inferior counterfeits, have been used beyond their time limits, have been previously approved but not properly returned to service, be stolen, come with fraudulent labels, production overruns that were not sold with the agency's permission, and those that are untraceable. The parts are cheaper to buy and more profitable to sell than approved parts. Unapproved parts have been found on both civilian and military aircraft, and faulty ones have caused hundreds of incidents and crashes, some fatal, with about 24 crashes between 2010 and 2016.

Many other industries besides aviation are plagued by counterfeit and bogus parts of inferior quality, but the potential consequences of such failures are far less serious.

== Types and origins of unapproved parts ==
"Counterfeit parts" are those not made by the manufacturer they claim to be from. They are usually made of inferior materials by inadequate processes and not tested, designed only to bear a close resemblance to genuine parts. The term "bogus parts" can loosely refer to various categories of unapproved parts. "Life-limited" and "time-expired" parts are legitimate parts that have been used beyond their design lifespan. Some parts which are life-limited or of unknown condition are taken from scrapyards, and illegally installed on aircraft. A used part may be legally salvaged, but supporting information must be supplied. Some unapproved parts come from genuine manufacturers' production lines; some of these may simply be airworthy production overruns, but others may be defective samples that failed required testing.

Boeing has stated that mechanical parts, electronic parts and materials have been counterfeited. Physical parts include bolts, nuts, and rivets. Electronic parts include resistors, capacitors, and integrated circuits. Materials include composite chemicals, steel, and titanium. In 1996 unapproved parts were found to originate from sources such as counterfeiters, thieves, "strip and dip" operations which hide defects with metal plating, and from production overruns.

== History ==
The crash of Partnair Flight 394 in 1989 resulted from the installation of counterfeit aircraft parts. Counterfeit bolts, attaching the vertical stabilizer of a Convair CV-580 to the fuselage, wore down excessively, allowing the tail to vibrate to the extent that it eventually broke off.

In 1990, US President George H. W. Bush appointed Mary Schiavo as the Inspector General of the U.S. Department of Transportation. Schiavo began campaigns to curb the sale of unapproved parts and led subsequent investigations. By 1996, the investigations resulted in hundreds of criminal convictions, restitution, fines totalling about US$47 million, and prison sentences of up to five years.

In August 1993, a group of criminals stole a cockpit computer from a Carnival Airlines aircraft at Fort Lauderdale-Hollywood International Airport. During the day the criminals contacted "potential buyers" at John F. Kennedy International Airport in New York City. The "buyers" were actually Federal Bureau of Investigation (FBI) agents performing "Operation Skycrook," a sting operation to deter thieves of commercial aircraft parts.

In 1995, after the crash of American Airlines Flight 965, scavengers took cockpit avionics, engine thrust reversers, and other parts from the crash site by helicopter. Many of the stolen parts appeared for sale in the Greater Miami area. In response, American Airlines published a 14-page list of the parts missing from the crashed aircraft, including the serial numbers.

An FAA study concluded that, from May 1973 to April 1996, unapproved parts contributed to 174 aircraft accidents and minor incidents, causing 39 injuries and 17 fatalities. None of the accidents and incidents in the study involved major commercial airlines. Some critics, including William Cohen, a member of the U.S. Senate from Maine, argued that the FAA may have understated the role of unapproved parts of some accidents because the agency did not want to take the responsibility of regulating the aircraft parts industry. James Frisbee, who retired in 1992 as the quality control head of Northwest Airlines, argued that unapproved parts may have been a factor in far more accidents than the numbers stated on U.S. federal accident and incident records.

The United States Congress passed the Aircraft Safety Act of 2000, allowing the government to target the sale and use of unapproved parts.

Around 2003, the U.S. state of Florida was an international center for the vending of unapproved aircraft parts.

Old and faulty parts scavenged from scrapped aircraft were sold illegally as new parts in Italy from the late 1990s, and were reported in 2002 to be possibly linked to up to ten air crashes. Unapproved parts are considered to have played a role in about 24 crashes that killed seven people and injured 18 between 2010 and 2016.

In the United Kingdom, between 2019 and 2023, a company called AOG Technics supplied an estimated 60,000 parts for CFM56 engines with forged documents. The director of the company pleaded guilty to fraudulent trading and, in February 2026, he was sentenced to 56 months imprisonment.

== See also ==
- American Airlines Flight 965
- Aviation safety
- Partnair Flight 394
