= Sørstokken =

Peninsula in Stord, Norway

- Peninsula
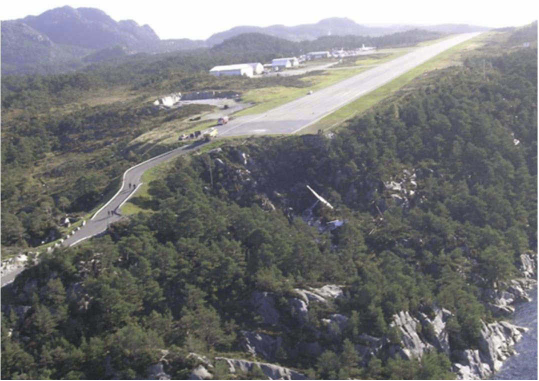
- Interactive map of Sørstokken
- Coordinates: 59.79078°N 5.35032°E
- Location: Vestland, Norway
- Part of: Stord island
- Offshore water bodies: Stokksund

Sørstokken is a peninsula on the island of Stord in Stord Municipality in Vestland county, Norway. The peninsula is 3.4 kilometres (2.1 mi) long and about 1 kilometre (0.62 mi) wide. It is connected to the main part of the island by a 500-metre (1,600 ft) wide isthmus. Other than a small residential area on the isthmus, Stord Airport, Sørstokken is the only major thing located on the peninsula. The peninsula is located about 13 kilometres (8.1 mi) northwest of the town of Leirvik.
