= Norving =

Norwegian regional airline

- Founded: 1971
- Ceased operations: 1993
- Headquarters: Kirkenes, Norway

Norving A/S was a regional airline that operated in Norway between 1971 and 1993. It had roots back to the establishment of Varangfly in 1959. At its peak, the company had eight bases and 27 aircraft.

== History ==
Varangfly was founded on 24 July 1959 by Bjarne Zakariassen, Bjørn Rist and Odd Bentzen. In 1971, the company merged with Tromsø-based Nor-Wings, and the following year it bought Bodø-based Nordlandsfly. At that time the airline was renamed Norving. With the take-over, Norving had ambulance aircraft covering all of Northern Norway.

With the construction of the regional airports in Western Troms and in Finnmark, Norving competed to get the concession for subsidies from the Ministry of Transport. The government chose instead to grant the concession to Widerøe, who had been operating the other parts of the regional airports in Western and Northern Norway.

Norving continued to work for more regional airports in Finnmark, and was instrumental in establishing them in Berlevåg, Båtsfjord, Gamvik, Hasvik and Kjøllefjord. During the 1980s, Norving made a massive expansion into Southern Norway, and tried to capture concessions for routes feeding the regional airport to the large cities. In particular, the airline established itself at Skien Airport, Geiteryggen, Geilo Airport, Dagali, Fagernes Airport, Leirin, Sandefjord Airport, Torp, Stord Airport, Sørstokken and Hamar Airport, Stafsberg. However, Norving could not make enough revenue to make a profit, and was forced to massively close down routes. At the most, the company had eight bases and 27 aircraft. By 1989, there was only two bases and four planes still in operation, before the company filed for bankruptcy in 1993. Subsidized routes in Northern Norway were taken over by Widerøe.

== Fleet ==
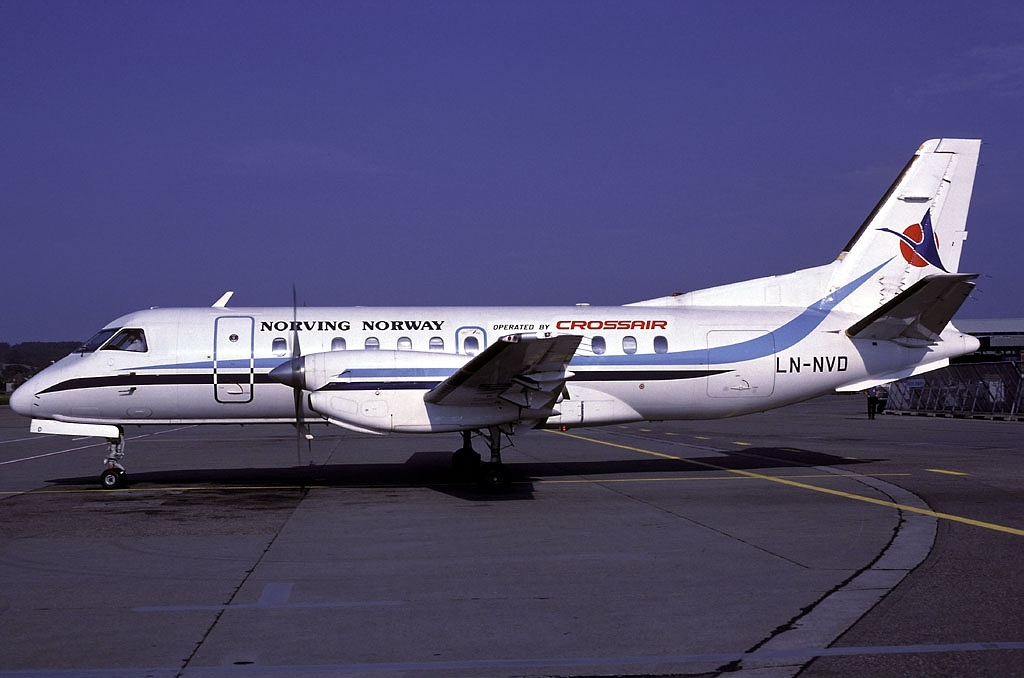
Norving Saab 340

Through its history, Norving operated the following aircraft:

Model	Quantity	Built	First in	Last out
Piper Cub	2	1943–44	1960	1965
Honningstad C.5 Polar	1	1948	1960	1977
Beech Twin Bonanza	1		1962	1963
Cessna 180	1	1961	1961	1963
Cessna 185	5	1961	1961	1971
Noorduyn Norseman	2	1941–44	1965	1972
Republic Seabee	1	1948	1966	1967
de Havilland Canada Beaver	3	1956–67	1972	1981
de Havilland Canada Otter	1	1954	1967	1982
Britten-Norman Islander	8	1969–76	1970	1992
Piper PA-31 Navajo	7	1971–80	1972	1988
Cessna 150	1	1969	1969	1971
Piper Cherokee	1	1967	1967	1972
Cessna 206	11	1968–77	1970	1982
Partenavia P.68	1	1975	1975	1978
Cessna 310	2	1975–76	1975	1978
Cessna 404	5	1977–80	1977	1986
Cessna 441	5	1975–82	1979	1990
Beech 99	2	1968	1984	1987
Fairchild Metroliner	2	1981–82	1983	1989
Dornier 228	9	1982–86	1982	1992
Saab 340	3	1985–87	1985	1989

== Destinations ==
Destinations served by Norving:

- Alta (Alta Airport)
- Bergen (Bergen Airport, Flesland)
- Berlevåg (Berlevåg Airport)
- Båtsfjord (Båtsfjord Airport)
- Fagernes (Fagernes Airport, Leirin)
- Hamar (Hamar Airport, Stafsberg)
- Hammerfest (Hammerfest Airport)
- Hasvik (Hasvik Airport)
- Haugesund (Haugesund Airport, Karmøy)
- Honningsvåg (Honningsvåg Airport, Valan)
- Kirkenes (Kirkenes Airport, Høybuktmoen)
- Kristiansand (Kristiansand Airport, Kjevik)
- Mehamn (Mehamn Airport)
- Molde (Molde Airport, Årø)
- Oslo (Oslo Airport, Fornebu)
- Sandefjord (Sandefjord Airport, Torp)
- Skien (Skien Airport, Geiteryggen)
- Stord (Stord Airport, Sørstokken)
- Tromsø (Tromsø Airport)
- Trondheim (Trondheim Airport, Værnes)
- Vadsø (Vadsø Airport)
- Vardø (Vardø Airport, Svartnes)
