= List of defunct airlines of Norway =

This is a list of defunct airlines of Norway.

Airline	Image	IATA	ICAO	Callsign	Commenced operations	Ceased operations	Notes
A
A/S Aero					1920	1920	
Aerotransport					1924	1946	Operated Junkers F 13, Junkers G 24, Junkers W 33, Junkers Ju 52, Douglas DC-3
Agderfly			AGD	AGDERFLY	1966	2004	
Air Europe Scandinavia					1989	1991	Established as Norway Airlines, and later named back to Norway Airlines.
Air Executive Norway		BS			1972	1980	Renamed Busy Bee of Norway
Air Norway		M3	NFA	NORTH FLYING	2003	2017	
Air Stord		GO	SOR	AIR STORD	1990	1999	Went bankrupt
Air Team		8W	TTX	AIR TEAM	1978	2000	Operated Cessna Caravan
Air-X			NAX	SCANBIRD	1987	1988	
Airwing			NWG	AIRWING	2004	2023	Fied for bankruptcy in 2023.
Arctic Air		8A	AKR	ARCTIC NORWAY	1996	2003	Went bankrupt
B
Bergen Air Transport (1961)			BAT		1961	1977	Operated Douglas C-54
Bergen Air Transport (1998)			BGT	BERGEN AIR	1998	2017	
Bergen Aviation					1986	1988	
Bergens Aero					1934	1935	Founded by Gidsken Jakobsen. Operated Loening C-2
Bjørumfly					1963	1966	Acquired by Ski og Sjøfly. Operated Beech Queen Air, Cessna Skyhawk, Cessna 206, SIAI-Marchetti FN.333 Riviera
BlueWay Offshore			BWN	BLUEHELI	2009	2014	Sold to Noordzee Helikopters Vlaanderen
Braathens		BU	BRA	BRAATHENS	1997	2004	Renamed SAS Braathens
Braathens Helikopter				BEE COPTER	1989	1993	
Braathens S.A.F.E. (Braathens South American & Far East Airtransport)		BU	BRA		1946	1997	Renamed Braathens
Busy Bee		BS	BEE	BUSYBEE	1980	1992	Reestablished as Norwegian Air Shuttle
Busy Bee Air Service					1966	1980	Renamed/absorbed by Busy Bee of Norway
C
Classic Norway Air			BGT		2004	2010	Operated BAe Jetstream 31
Coast Aero Center		BX	CST	COAST CENTER	1975	1988	
Coast Air		BX	CST	COAST CENTER	1988	2008	Founded on the remains of Coast Aero Center
Color Air		CL	CLA	PENNANT	1998	1999	Went bankrupt
Coronet Norge					1969	2001	Operated Cessna Caravan
D
Det Norske Luftfartselskap					1933	1945	
Det Norske Luftfartsrederi (DNL)					1918	1920	
F
Feel Air					2009	2011	Not launched
Fjellanger Widerøe					1970	2003	Operated Rockwell Commander 690
Fjellfly					1954	1972	Went bankrupt
Fjellfly Einar Andersen					1977	2006	At the beginning operated seaplanes. Renamed ScanAviation
FlyNonstop		J7	DNM	DENIM	2013	2013	
Flyr		FS	FOX	GREENSTAR	2021	2023	
FlyTaxi Nord					2000	2015	Merged into Viking Air Norway. Operated Piper Chieftain
FlyViking		VF	FVK	BALDER	2017	2018	
Fred. Olsen Airtransport		FO	FOF	FREDOLSEN	1946	1997	
G
Giaevair					2015	2016	Founded by Ola O.K Giæver. Renamed FlyViking
GuardAir		FB	JAP	GUARD-AIR	1992	2001	Went bankrupt
H
Hamarfly			HAM		1994	1998	Operated Beech King Air
Hangar 5 Air Services			HAX		1999	1999	Operated Cessna Caravan, Cessna Citation I
Helikopter Services					1966	2000	
HelikopterDrift					2007	2011	Acquired by Helitrans
Hesnes Air			HSG	SKY DOLPHIN	1992	2018	
K
Kato Airline		6S	KAT	KATO-AIR	1995	2008	
Krohn Air					2010	2014	
L
Lofotfly					1996	2000	Renamed FlyTaxi Nord. Operated Cessna Stationair seaplane
Lotsberg & Skappel					1933	1934	Owned by Helge Skappel, Leiv Brun, Ditlef Smith and Erik Engnæs. Operated de Havilland DH.60 Moth
M
Mey-Air		MT		MARITIME	1970	1974	Went bankrupt
Mørefly			MOR		1955	1995	Founded by Elling Lande, Per Dalen and Kåre Stein Haram
N
Nor Flyselskap					1962	1968	Operated de Havilland Heron
Nor-Fly Charter					1971	1984	Merged into Partnair
Nor-Wings					1970	1971	Merged with Varangfly
Nord-Norges Aero					1932	1934	Founded and owned by Gidsken Jakobsen. Operated Junkers F 13
Nordic Air					1970	1973	Acquired by and merged into Fred. Olsen Airtransport
Nordlandsfly					1971	1972	Acquired by Varangfly
Nordsjøfly					1977	1983	
Norronafly					1954	1966	Founded by Odvar Korsvoldwas. Operated Auster Autocrat, Piper Tripacer, Piper Super Cub, Finnmark 5A, Convair 240
Norsk Air		NC	NIR		1985	1990	Acquired by Wideroe and rebranded as Wideroe Norsk Air
Norsk Flytjeneste					1972	1985	Established as Vestfoldfly in 1961. Renamed Norsk Air. Operated Beech King Air, Cessna Citation, Douglas DC-6
Norsk Forurensningskontroll					1983	1986	
Norsk Helikopter					1993	2009	Renamed Bristow Norway
Norsk Lufttrafikk					1920s	1920s	Operated Savoia-Marchetti, LFG
Norsk Lufttrafikk Erling Jensen					1935	1937	Founded by Floor and Erling Jensen. Operated Security Airster S-1, Spartan Arrow, Stinson SM-1F
Norske Luftruter					1928	1934	Operated LFG V 130
Nortrans Agderfly					1982	1987	Renamed Agderfly. Operated Piper Aztec, Piper Navajo, Mitsubishi MU-2
Norving		RT			1972	1993	Went bankrupt
Norway Airlines		JA	NOS	NORSPEED	1988	1992	Went bankrupt
Norwegian Air Lines (DNL)		SK	DNL	SCANDINAVIAN	1933	1951	Merged with Swedish Intercontinental Airlines and Danish Air Lines to form Scandinavian Airlines
Norwegian Air Norway		DH	NAN	NORSHIP	2013	2023	Reintegrated into Norwegian Air Shuttle
Norwegian Long Haul		DY	NLH	RED NOSE	2013	2021	Parent company ceased long haul
Norwegian Overseas Airways					1971	1976	Founded by Thor Tjøntveit
O
Offshore Helicopters					1974	1980	
P
Partnair		PD	PAR	PARTNAIR	1971	1989	Went bankrupt following crash
Polarfly					1947	1948	Merged with Widerøe's Flyveselskap AS
* Polaris Air Transport					1964	1969	Operated Douglas DC-3, Convair 240
R
Rorosfly Cargo					1973	1975	Operated Carvair
S
Saga Norsk Flytjeneste					1971	1972	Renamed Troll-Air. Operated Douglas DC-6B
SAS Braathens		BU	CNO	SCANOR	2004	2007	Renamed/merged into SAS Scandinavian Airlines Norge
SAS Commuter		SK	SKS	SCANDINAVIAN	1988	2004	Merged into SAS Group
SAS Norge		SK	CNO	SCANOR	2007	2009	Merged with SAS Sweden, SAS Denmark and SAS International to form SAS Scandinavian Airlines
SAS Norlink		SK			1990	2003	Operated Fokker 50
Scancopter-Service					1956	1966	Renamed Helikopter Services
Ski og Sjøfly					1964	1967	Floatplane operator. Took over Bjørumfly. Operated Cessna Skyhawk, Cessna Skywagon, Piper Super Cub
Sørfly					1946	1962	
Stellar Airfreighter					1970	1977	Operated Convair 440, Douglas DC-3, Fairchild FH-227
Svalbardfly					1975	1985	Founded by Einar S. and Ingrid Pedersen. Operated Cessna Skywagon
T
Teddy Air		ZJ	TED	TEDDYS	1990	2004	
Telemark Flyselskap					1947	1971	Founded by Sigvard Nicolaisen. Operated Piper Cub
Thor Solbergs Aviation					1961	1966	Operated Cessna 140, Cessna 172, Cessna 180, Cessna 310, Noorduyn Norseman
Thor Solbergs Flyveselskap					1938	1940	Founded by Thor Solberg. Operated Aeronca K, Cessna Airmaster
Trans Polar					1970	1971	
Trans Wing			TWG	TRANSWING CARGO	1999	2006	Operated Beech King Air, Cessna Caravan
Troll-Air					1972	1972	Established as Saga Norsk Flytjeneste. Operated Douglas DC-4, Douglas DC-6B
U
Ugland Air Taxi			UGG		1991	1998	Operated Beech Super King Air
V
Varangfly					1960	1972	Renamed to Norving
Vest-Norges Flyveselskap					1935	1939	Operated Cessna Airmaster, Security Airster S-1, Waco YKS-7
Vestfoldfly					1961	1972	Founded by Øyvind Skaunfelt. Renamed Norsk Flytjeneste
Vestlandske Luftfartsselskap					1947	1957	
Viking Air Norway					2015	2016	Merged into FlyViking
Vildanden		2Q			2005	2011	Went bankrupt
Vingtor Airways					1946	1948	Operated Handley Page Halifax
W
West Norway Airlines					1946	2018	
Widerøe's Flyveselskap AS		WF	WIF		1934	1948	
Widerøe & Bjørneby					1933	1934	Founded by Viggo Widerøe and Halvor Bjørneby. Merged with Lotsberg & Skappel to form Widerøe
Widerøe Norsk Air					1991	1996	Originally Norsk Air. Merged into Widerøe
Widerøe's Flyveselskap & Polarfly					1948	1958	

== See also ==
- List of airlines of Norway
- List of airports in Norway
