= Airwing =

Norwegian airline

IATA	ICAO	Call sign
-	NWG	NORWING
- Founded: 2004
- Ceased operations: February 8, 2023
- Operating bases: Oslo Airport, Gardermoen
- Fleet size: 7
- Headquarters: Gardermoen, Norway
- Key people: Anna-Helene Kjos Mathiesen (CEO)
- Website: airwing.no

Airwing AS was a Norwegian regional airline based at Oslo Airport, Gardermoen. It operated a fleet of Learjet 45s and Beechcraft Super King Airs, which it used for a mix of scheduled, air taxi and air ambulance services. Established in 2004, the airline initially focused on air ambulance and air taxi operations.

== History ==
The airline was established in 2004 with a base at Oslo Airport, Gardermoen. Initially using a fleet of Beechcraft King Air, the airline flew a mix of air taxi and business charter flights. About half the company's revenue was sourced from international air ambulance flights on contract with various insurance companies. The airline had a revenue of 28 million Norwegian kroner in 2011 and had 18 employees. By 2012 the airline bought its sixth Beechcraft Super King Air. In 2018 it added a Bombardier Learjet 45 to its fleet, and in 2019 yet another Learjet 45.

Airwing commenced its first scheduled service on 11 July 2012, from Notodden Airport, Tuven to Stavanger Airport, Sola. With one daily round trip, to Stavanger in the morning and to Notodden in the afternoon, the route targeted the subsea industry in Notodden and Kongsberg. The route was sufficiently successful that Airwing started a second route out of Notodden, to Bergen Airport, Flesland. This route was, however, in competition with an existing airline, Bergen Air Transport. As with the Stavanger route, the Bergen route was flown out of Notodden in the morning with a return in the afternoon. From 21 May 2013 Airwing extended the Stavanger service with a second leg, continuing onwards to Florø Airport and with a return in the afternoon. By 2015 the route to Bergen had been terminated. It was later restarted, but was put on hold again 22 November 2019.

== Destinations ==
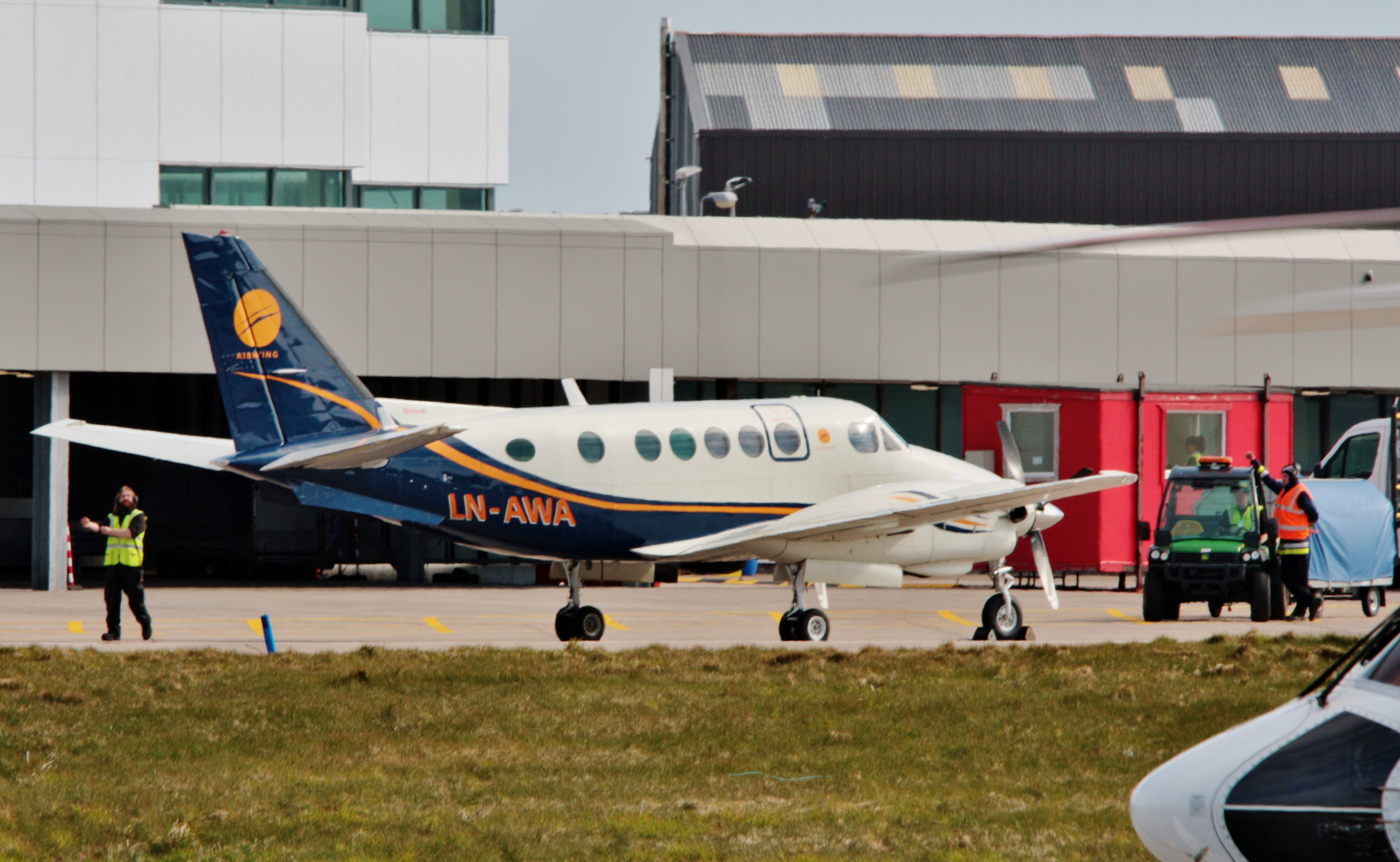
Airwing Beechcraft King Air at Sumburgh Airport (2017)

The following destinations were served by Airwing as scheduled services:

Airwing destinations
Location	Airport	Start	End	Ref(s)
Bergen	Bergen Airport, Flesland	2012	2023	
Notodden	Notodden Airport, Tuven	2011	2023	

== See also ==
- List of defunct airlines of Norway
