= Norway Airlines =

Airline of Norway (1988–1992)

IATA	ICAO	Call sign
JA	NOS	NORSPEED
- Founded: 2 April 1987
- Commenced operations: February 1988
- Ceased operations: 15 October 1992
- Operating bases: Stavanger–Sola; Oslo–Fornebu
- Fleet size: 2
- Destinations: 2
- Headquarters: Tananger, later Fornebu, Norway

Norway Airlines A/S was a Norwegian airline which operated between 1988 and 1992. Focusing on charter, the airline operated two Boeing 737-300 aircraft from 1988 to 1992, after which it operated two McDonnell Douglas MD-80 aircraft, one MD-83 and one MD-87. The airline flew a single scheduled route, between Oslo Airport, Fornebu and London Gatwick Airport, at first on contract with Air Europe and from 1991 at its own expense. At its peak, Norway Airlines had 196 employees. The company struggled financially and lost more than 100 million Norwegian krone (NOK) before terminating operations, having never made a profit.

The airline was established by Trøndelag-based investors on 2 April 1987, having been originally intended to operate charter flights to the Mediterranean area. Ansett Australia was an early investor, but soon sold out. The company suffered with its main contractor, Sun Tours, going bankrupt in 1988, after which the airline moved to the British charter market. Air Europe's holding company bought a third of Norway Airlines in October 1989; this allowed the Norwegian company to start flying Air Europe's route between Oslo and Gatwick as a wet lease operation, in addition to several international destinations from London. Air Europe went bankrupt in March 1991, causing Norway Airlines to temporarily halt operations.

Sterling Airways came in as a new strategic minority owner, and the two airlines started an alliance along with Transwede. Their key goal was to secure concessions to fly between the Scandinavian capital cities of Oslo, Stockholm and Copenhagen, but no permission was ever granted. Instead Norway Airlines started its own service between Oslo and London. Operations ceased on 14 October 1992 after the board had filed for bankruptcy.

== History ==
=== Establishment ===
Norway Airlines was established on 2 April 1987 by Kjell Adserø and his holding company Hell Holding, along with several other investors from Trøndelag—the largest of which was Lyng Industrier. The business model was to operate charter flights from Norway to the Mediterranean; eighty percent of the market was carried out with foreign airlines and Adserø believed that Norwegians not only would prefer a Norwegian carrier, but would be willing to pay more for one. The company had an initial share capital of NOK 10 million and established its head office and main base at Stavanger Airport, Sola. Separate companies, organized as kommandittselskap, were established to own each aircraft and lease them to the airline. The aircraft owner companies paid 28.7 million United States dollars for each Boeing 737-300, which were delivered new from Boeing Commercial Airplanes. Shares in the aircraft owning companies was offered to the public with a four-percent annual return on investment. Part of the investment model was based on tax advantages.

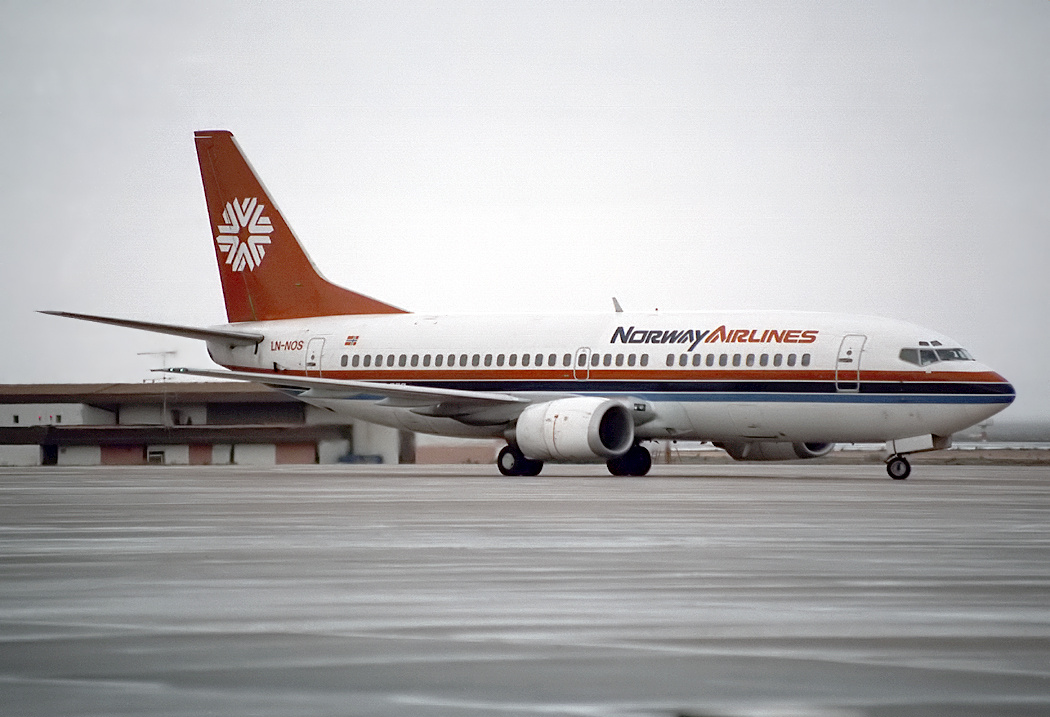
Norway Airlines Boeing 737-300

The share capital was expanded to NOK 20 million in September 1987. Among the purchasers was Ansett Australia, who bought a twenty-percent stake. Ragnar Lyng replaced Adeserø as chairman and Johan H. Gedde-Dahl was hired as managing director. Original plans were to start operations on 24 October 1987, but this had to be postponed due to late delivery of the aircraft. Revenue flights commenced in February 1988, after delivery of the airline's first 148-passenger Boeing 737-300, City of Trondheim. The airline's second 737-300, City of Stavanger, was delivered the same month, but was leased to Monarch Airlines. About sixty percent of the company's initial business was flying on contract with Sun Tours.

Gedde-Dahl was replaced by Kristian Åreskjold in March 1988. The company lost NOK 15 million in 1987 and budgeted with a deficit of NOK 13 million the following year. To cover the losses, the airline issued a private placement for NOK 12 million and a public issue of NOK 18 million. The airline retained only a single aircraft in operation until late 1989 and the staff of 50 to 60 employees was too much for the revenue form a single aircraft to cover. The airline planned to acquire a third aircraft in 1990 and budgeted with a profit of NOK 7 million in 1989 and NOK 32 million in 1990. Sun Tours filed for bankruptcy in late May 1988. However, Åreskjold stated that the bankruptcy "came at a convenient time" as in the short term Norway Airlines would fly back Sun Tours customers at the expense of the Norwegian Travel Guarantee Fund and that there was a deficit of aircraft on the European charter market. Within a week, Norway Airlines had signed a contract to fly with both aircraft for Britannia Airways out of London Gatwick Airport. A new issue of shares for NOK 25 to 30 million took place in June 1988 and the company stated its intent to list itself on the Trondheim Stock Exchange. Nils Erik Christensen had by then been appointed chairman.

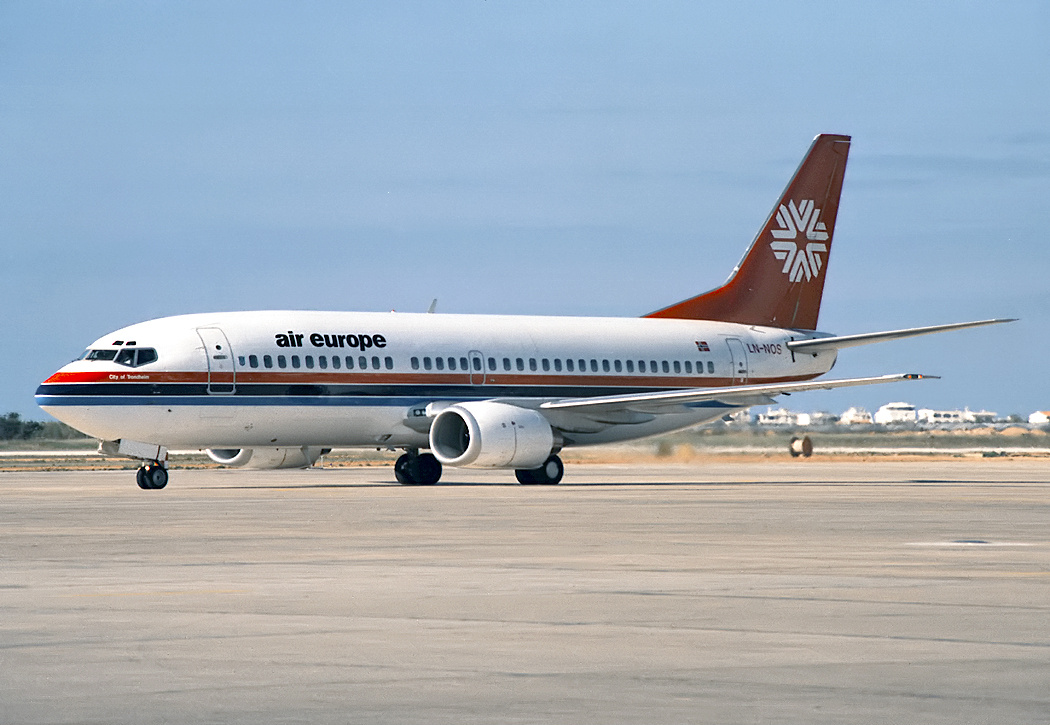
Norway Airlines aircraft with Air Europe titles in 1989

=== Air Europe Scandinavia ===
The airline was by September again in need of new capital. The contracts with Britannia ended on 1 November. While there was a high demand for 737-300 aircraft, aviation regulations hindered Norway Airlines from wet leaseing the aircraft (with full crew) and limited them to dry leaseing (without crew), which jeopardized the jobs of 86 employees. There were speculations in mid-October that Air Europe was planning to purchase Norway Airlines. Lyng had by then bought Ansett's share and held a 55-percent ownership. Norway Airlines announced on 25 October that they would lease both their aircraft to Air Europe on a five-year contract, one aircraft from November 1988 and one from March 1989. The airline would have to continue with ad-hoc charters for the one aircraft until March. The deal also involved that the United Kingdom-based International Leisure Group (ILG) would purchase a 33-percent share of Norway Airlines through a private placement of NOK 25 million.

Air Europe announced on 6 December 1988 that they would start a scheduled service between Oslo-Fornebu and London-Gatwick and intended to offer cheaper flights than the incumbents Scandinavian Airlines System (SAS) and British Airways. Operations started on 15 May, using Norway Airline's 737-300, which was reconfigured to seat 142 passengers in a two-class layout. Norway Airlines announced that they would take the brand name Air Europe Scandinavia and would paint their aircraft in the Air Europe livery, albeit with the flag of Norway. Air Europe simultaneously started services from Copenhagen and Stockholm to London. The Oslo–London route immediately achieved an eighty-percent cabin factor, with about twenty percent of its sales in business class. The capacity was doubled from November to two daily round trips. Other routes flown on behalf of Air Europe were from London to Rome, Gibraltar and Malta, although occasionally the aircraft could be used on other services. The London routes had after a year achieved a twenty-percent market share. Norway Airlines had by July 1990 lost an accumulated NOK 75 million and new shares worth NOK 40 million were issued to finance continued operations.

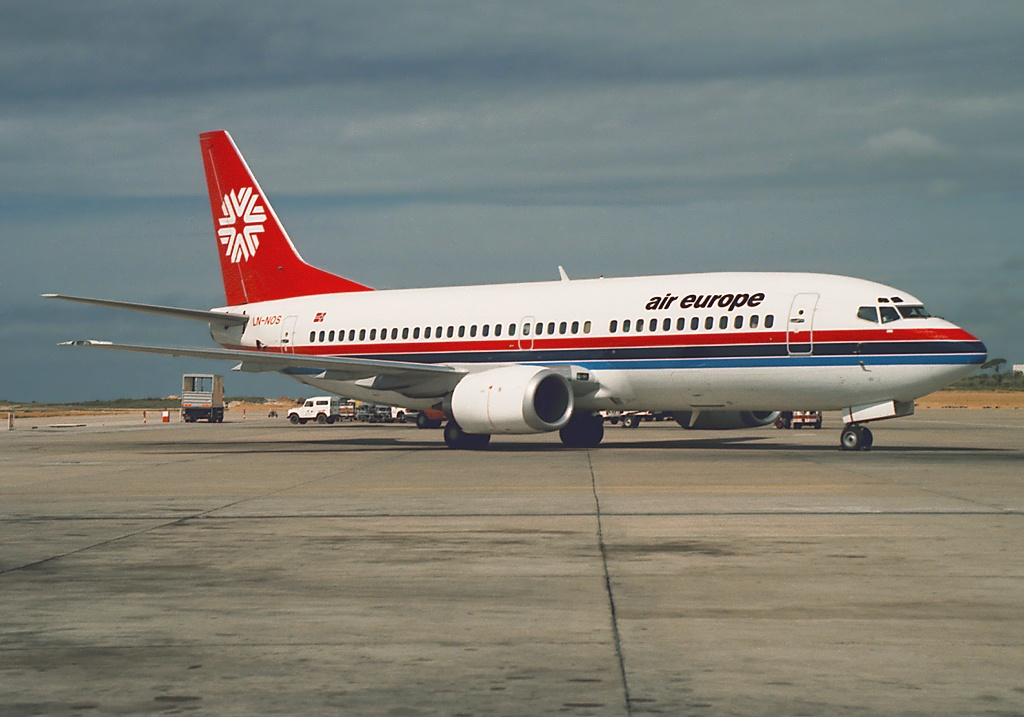
Aircraft with Air Europe titles

Norway Airlines applied in 1990 for permission to operate a charter route from Oslo to Penang, Malaysia, using a Boeing 757. The application was dismissed by the Ministry of Transport and Communications to protect SAS' route from Copenhagen to Singapore. The Penang route was necessary for Norway Airlines to procure a third aircraft, which according to the company was necessary to generate a profit, and would have created 100 new jobs. In the meantime, Tjæreborg Reiser sent their charter passengers with scheduled flights to London and onwards with British carriers to Malaysia. The dismissal was appealed to Minister of Transport and Communications, Lars Gunnar Lie of the Christian Democratic Party. The issue became a political issue within Syse's Cabinet, as the Conservative Party and the Progress Party were both in favor of increased deregulation of the airline industry. The issue was complicated by the common aviation policy of the three Scandinavian counties, which had largely been established to protect SAS' interest on international services. The cabinet therefore opened for discussion a further deregulation with the governments of Sweden and Denmark. The Conservative Party stated that this was in part a response to Danish and Swedish authorities allowing charter services to Phuket, Thailand, which could be seen as competing to SAS' route to Bangkok. Syse's Cabinet resigned on 3 November over issues regarding Norway and the European Union, before a reply to the application could be made.

The airline reached a non-public settlement with Thor Tjøntveit on 10 September regarding the latter's right to purchase one of Norway Airline's aircraft. Norway Airlines lost NOK 12 million in 1990. In January 1991, the airline won the contract to fly personnel the Norwegian Armed Forces, as the airline priced half a million krone lower than Busy Bee. Operations started in April and secured sufficient business that the airline could order its third aircraft, along with a contract from Gullivers Reiser for additional charter flights. Within a week it received concession to operate scheduled flights between Oslo, Copenhagen and Stockholm to London. A similar concession was also granted to Braathens SAFE, but they stated that the intense competition on the route would make it difficult for them to start a service. However, the five-year concession required that Norway Airlines not have any foreign citizens in the board; as two representatives for ILG sat on the board, they would have to resign for the concession to be valid. The Progress Party called for the law to be changed. Norway Airlines also applied for a route from Bergen and Stavanger to London.

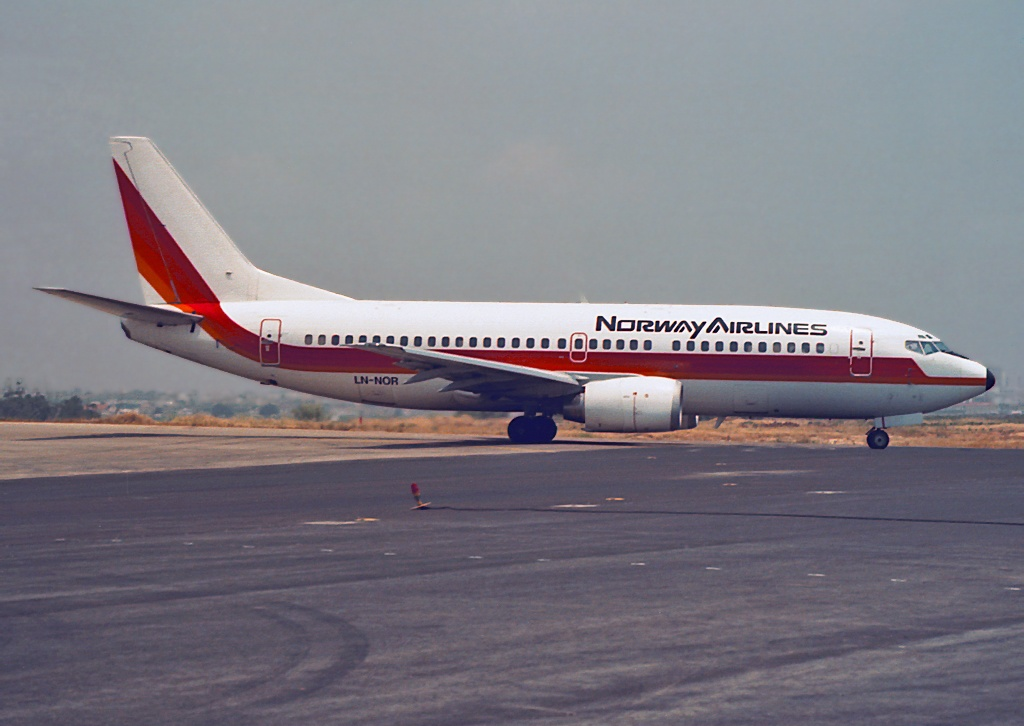
Boeing 737-300 aircraft in a transitory Air Europe–Norway Airlines livery

Air Europe fell under financial distress in 1991 and terminated all its Gatwick operations on 8 March. This resulted in Norway Airlines having to ground both its aircraft. Before operations could commence, the two creditors of the aircraft, Fokus Bank and Christiania Bank, had to refinance the two holding companies. As the aircraft remained grounded when the military contract started on 1 April, Norway Airlines had to lease aircraft externally to operate the charters. The aircraft were freed up towards the end of April, allowing the services with Gullivers Reiser to commence on 28 April. Originally the leases on the aircraft expired 1 April 1993 and 1994, respectively, but Norway Airlines renegotiated them to both expire 1 April 1994. The Gullivers Reiser contract involved flying from Norway to Greece, Spain, Portugal and Turkey. Air Europe's bankruptcy cost Norway Airlines NOK 6 million and required the company to reduce its staff from 196 to 106 employees. One aircraft was fully utilized, although the second was occasionally operated for Star Tour, Vingreiser and British Airways.

=== Nordic cooperation ===
Denmark's Sterling Airways bought ILG's share of Norway Airlines in mid July. The airlines announced a partnership, which also included Transwede. The Wallenberg-controlled NRT owned a 48-percent stake in Sterling and 66 percent of Transwede—the remaining third owned by Sterling. The three airlines applied for concessions to operate on the capital triangle between Oslo, Copenhagen and Stockholm. SAS held a monopoly on these routes and the airlines intended to capture the leisure market between the capital regions. Both ILG and Sterling were hindered in owning more than a third of Norway Airlines because of Norwegian corporate legislation. Fokus Bank had gradually become the largest shareholder in Norway Airline and owned 40.6 percent of the company in July 1991. At a shareholders meeting in July, Stein Øxseth was appointed chairman and all non-Norwegian board members were replaced.

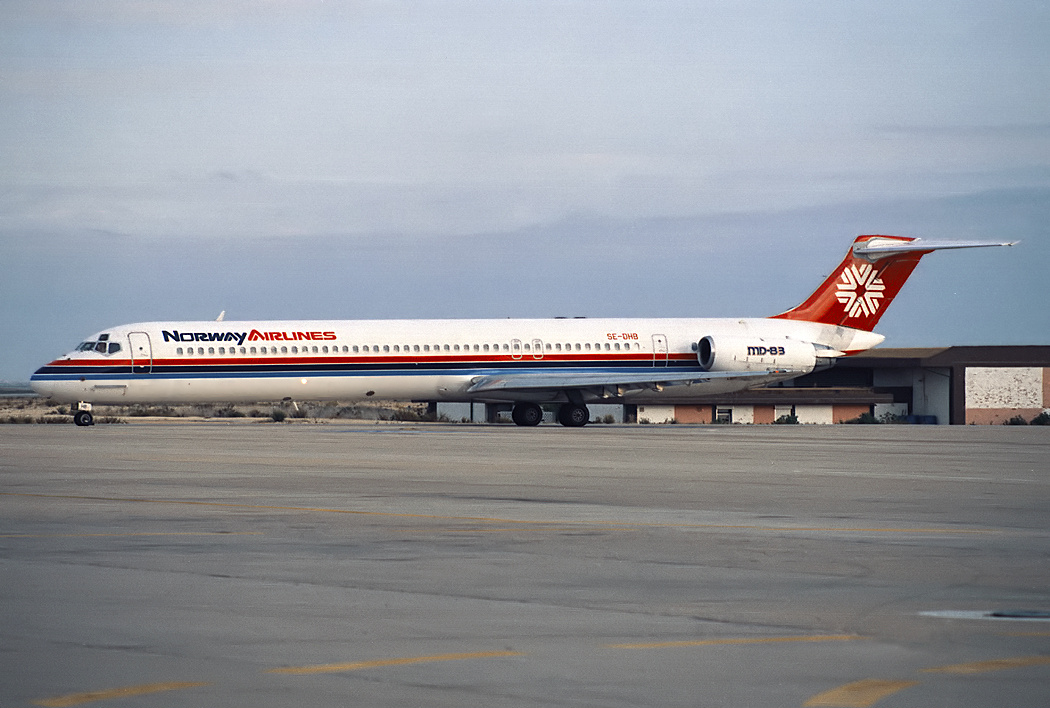
Norway Airlines introduced the McDonnell Douglas MD-83 in 1992

In September 1991, the government changed the policy for the military's procurement of air transport from 1 April 1992. This involved that the transport of 200,000 people annually would be transferred to scheduled services, resulting in Norway Airlines losing the opportunity to extend its engagement with the military. The route from Oslo to London was introduced on 3 October, at first with four weekly services, increasing to nine from 23 October. The three partner airlines launched their alliance as the TransNordic Group and would use a bowler hat as their common symbol. However, the routes arrived so late in the evening that the last flights from Fornebu to Trondheim, Bergen, Stavanger and Tromsø had all departed. After five months the airline had achieved a 55-percent cabin factor on the London route. The ministry rejected in December 1991 the airline's application for flying to Stockholm and Copenhagen. By December the British airline Dan-Air had also established itself on the Oslo–London route. To meet the price competition, SAS launched discounted business class tickets. In the course of twelve months from late 1991 to late 1992, the capacity between Oslo and London doubled, as also Norsk Air introduced a service from Sandefjord Airport, Torp.

Norway Airlines lost NOK 32 to 33 million in 1991. Norway Airlines replaced its two 737-300 aircraft with two McDonnell Douglas MD-80 aircraft leased from Transwede, one MD-83 and one MD-87. For the owners of the Boeing aircraft the move meant that they had to find a new lessee in a marketed where leasing prices had fallen from US$250,000 to US$150–180,000 per month. An interlining agreement was signed by Norway Airlines in March with British Airways and 25 other airlines at Gatwick. Norway Airlines announced on 15 March that it would take over the 25 Sterling employees in Norway in October. TransNordic Group started negotiations in June with Braathens SAFE, Maersk Air and Conair of Scandinavia for them to join the alliance. Prior to the roll-out of Amadeus reservation system in July 1992, Norway Airlines had not been included in the default searched of travel agents, who had to phone the airline to get a price quote.

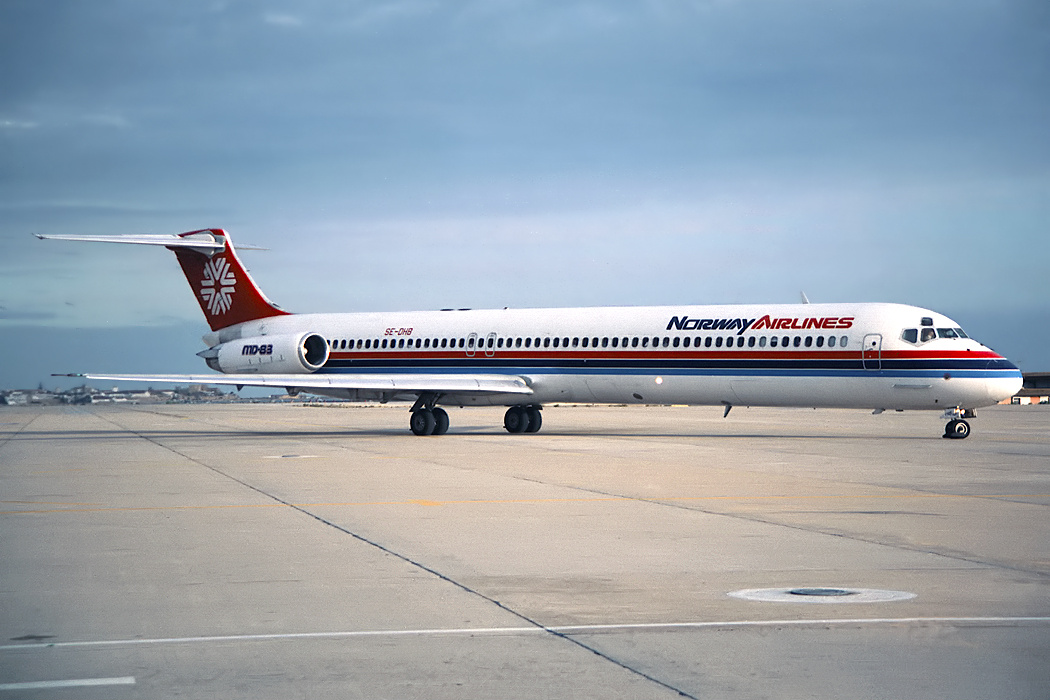
McDonnell Douglas MD-83

Foreign airlines were from 1 April 1992 permitted to fly passengers between the Scandinavian capitals, and both TAP Portugal and Delta Air Lines started flying passengers as extensions to their existing routes. This was negotiated as part of bilateral agreements and intra-Scandinavian agreements continued to hinder Norway Airlines from flying any of the routes. As of May, the Ministry of Transport and Communications had received applications to operate from Oslo to the other Scandinavian capitals by six airlines: Norway Airlines, Braathens SAFE, Transwede, Sterling, Maersk Air and Conair.

Norway Airline's board voted on 14 October 1992 to file for bankruptcy, and all aircraft were grounded on 15 October 1992. The official reason was "the crisis in the airline industry and unacceptable profitability", combined with Norwegian authorities' lack of willingness to grant the airline concessions. The airline had lost more than NOK 100 million by the start of the year and had failed to make a profit during 1992. Norway Airlines entered negotiations with Air Holland for the latter to purchase the airline, but the deal fell through on 1 December. Within days of the bankruptcy, Dan-Air also terminated operations. Braathens SAFE therefore decided to start flying the Fornebu–Gatwick route. Six days after Dan-Air's closure, the first schedules were published in the newspaper; slots and British permission was granted three days after that. The service started another two days later.

== Organization ==
When established, the company was based at Tananger in Sola Municipality outside Stavanger and had its main operative base at Stavanger Airport, Sola. The head office was later moved to Fornebu in Bærum Municipality outside Oslo, and the main base moved to Oslo Airport, Fornebu. At its peak the company had 196 employees, of which 144 were based in Norway. At the time of bankruptcy, the company had 120 employees, of which 78 were flight staff. Air Europe's CEO Rod Lynch stated that Air Europe, and in extension Norway Airlines, had forty percent lower operating costs than Lufthansa and twenty percent lower than British Airways. Lynch emphasized the lack of trade unions as a key to holding costs down. Air Europe claimed a thirty-four percent market share on passengers between Oslo and London.

Norway Airlines had a single-class service on their route and in their marketing claimed that they offered "business class service to everyone". The airline served a warm in-flight meal and drinks at the level of business class on other airlines. The airline hoped to attract business travelers to travel at a more reasonable fare, while attracting leisure travelers with better service. Norway Airlines pioneered smoke-free flights from Norway.

== Destinations ==
Norway Airlines only operated a single scheduled service, between Oslo and London. The route was flown nine times per week, two round trips per day on Thursdays, Fridays and Sundays, and one round trip per day on Mondays, Tuesdays and Wednesdays. The route saw an average 60,000 to 70,000 passengers per year.

Norway Airlines destinations
City	Country	Airport
Oslo	Norway	Oslo Airport, Fornebu
London	United Kingdom	London Gatwick Airport

== Fleet ==
Norway Airlines operated the following aircraft:

Norway Airlines aircraft
Model	Period	Quantity
Boeing 737-300	1988–1992	2
McDonnell Douglas MD-83	1992	1
McDonnell Douglas MD-87	1992	1
