= Hamar Airport, Stafsberg =

Hamar Airport, Stafsberg Hamar flyplass, Stafsberg
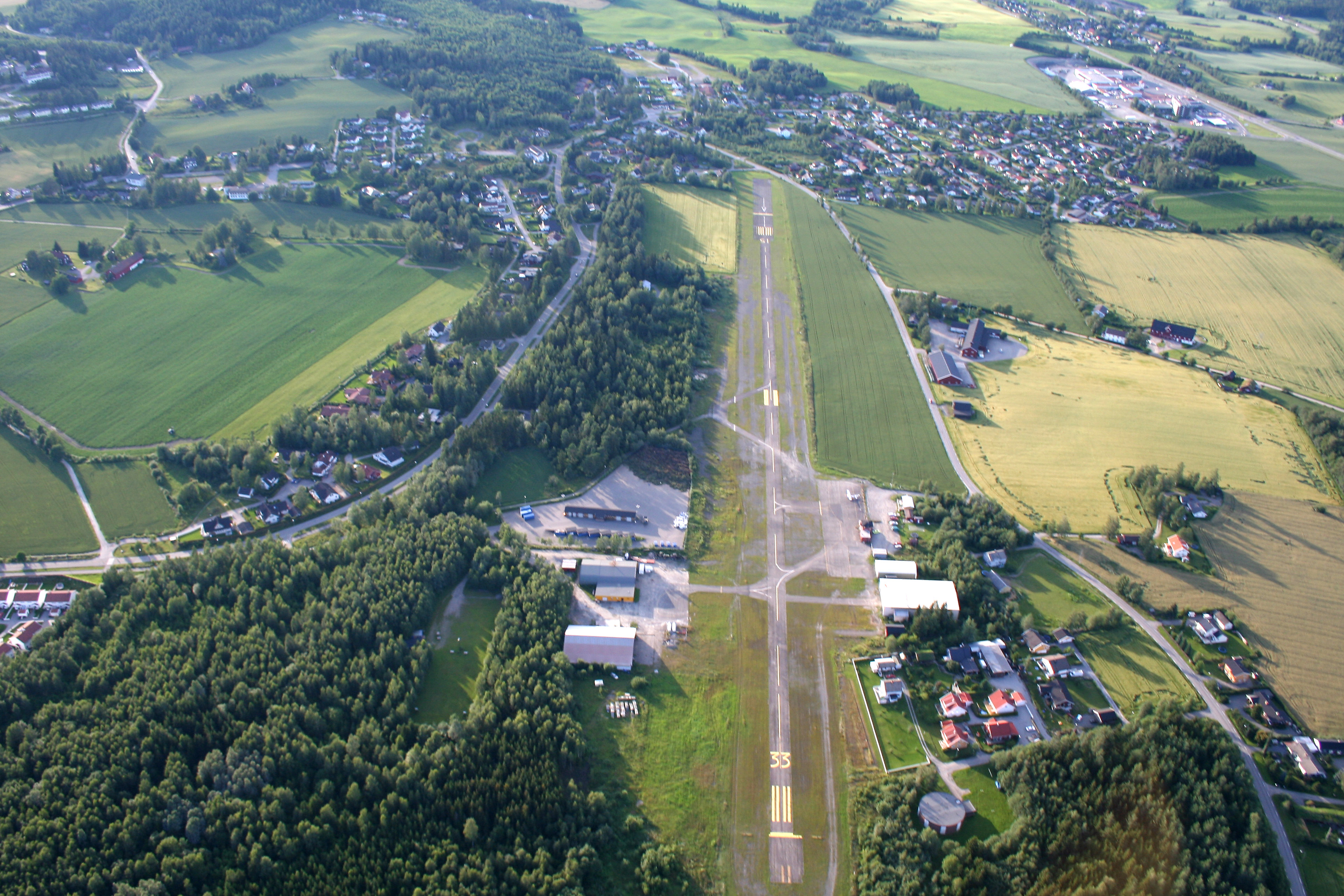
- IATA: HMR; ICAO: ENHA

Summary
- Airport type: Public
- Operator: Hamar Municipality
- Location: Hamar, Norway
- Elevation AMSL: 222.5 m / 730 ft
- Coordinates: 60°49′05″N 11°04′05″E
- Website: hamarlufthavn.no

Map

Runways
Direction	Length		Surface
Direction	m	ft	Surface
15–33	944	2,840	Asphalt

Hamar Airport, Stafsberg (Norwegian: Hamar flyplass, Stafsberg; IATA: HMR, ICAO: ENHA) is a general aviation airport located at Stafsberg on the north side of the town of Hamar in Hamar Municipality, Norway. It features a 944-by-23-meter (3,097 by 75 ft) runway aligned 15–33 and is owned by Hamar Municipality. The airport is located in an area with very stable climate and good flying conditions.

The airport was built as a joint project between Hamar Municipality and the Royal Norwegian Air Force (RNoAF). The airport opened with a 600-meter (2,000 ft) runway in 1950, which was extended to the current length two years later. Braathens SAFE operated scheduled flights to Oslo, Trondheim and Røros between 1956 and 1958. Flytransport and Helilift both established themselves at Stafsberg during the 1960s, becoming major domestic players in the training of helicopter pilots. The airport received a refurbishment in 1985 and from 1986 to 1988 Widerøe operated scheduled services to Oslo, Bergen, and Trondheim. Scan-Craft resumed the services, but closed down the following year. Hamar Fly carried out scheduled services in 1995, but also they failed to make money on a route.

== History ==
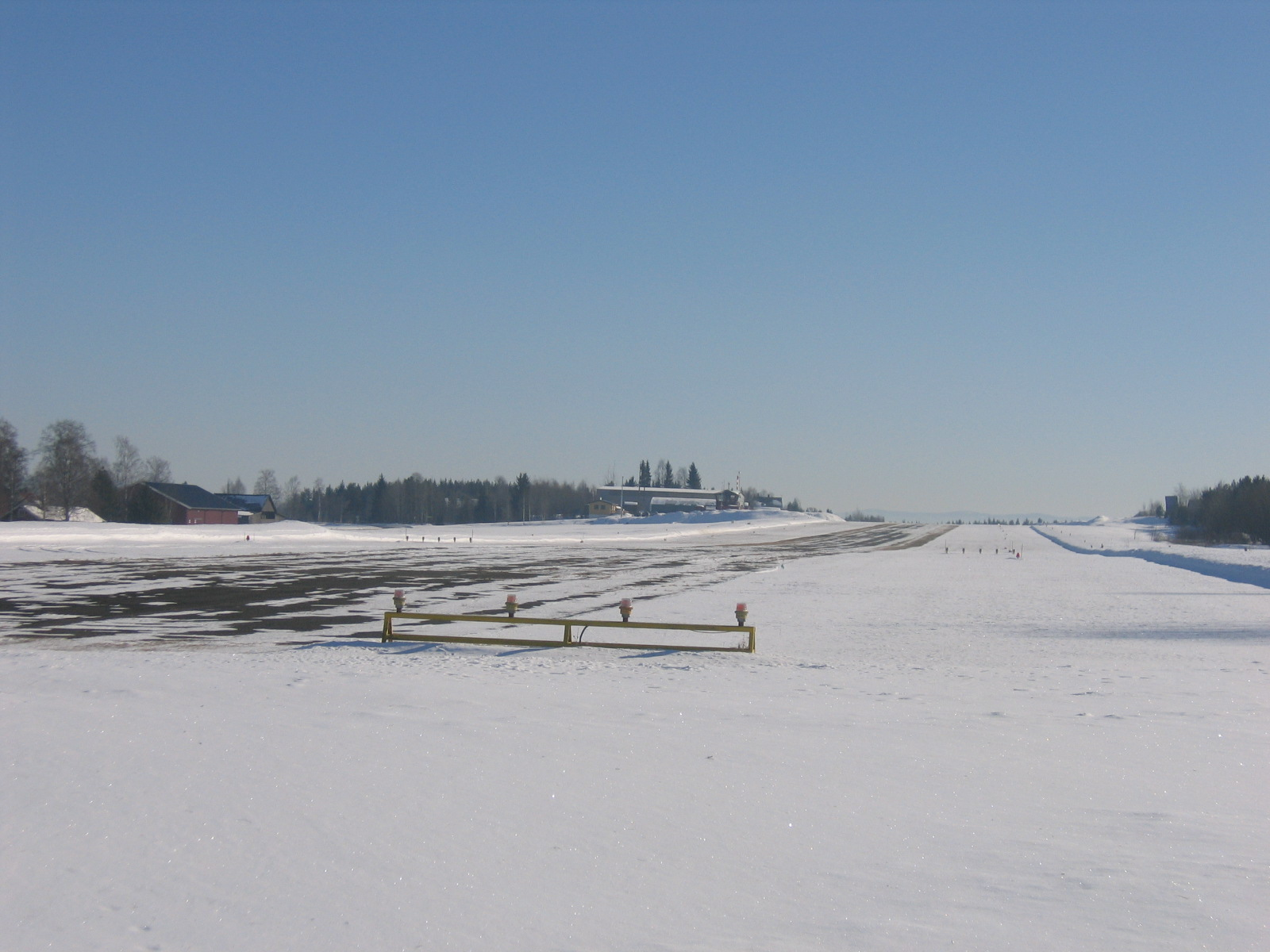
Hamar Airport during winter

Hamar built a water aerodrome close to Hamar Station in 1948. It used the lake of Mjøsa as its water body and during winter it would occasionally be prepared so that ski planes could land. The initiative for a land airport came from the Royal Norwegian Air Force, which on 7 October 1948 sent a letter to Hamar Municipality asking if they had plans for an airport. Because the municipality had just invested in the water aerodrome, they had not considered the considerable investment which would be necessary for a land airport. In an executive board meeting on 26 October the municipality established an airport committee. A location was found at Stafsberg, which at the time was located at the intersection between Hamar Municipality, Furnes Municipality and Vang Municipality. The site was formerly used by the Norwegian Army and therefore no expropriation was necessary. The airport's plans were finalized and approved in mid 1950.

Construction commenced immediately and took less than four months. Of the investment of 124,000 Norwegian krone (NOK), 60,000 was paid for by Hamar Municipality, 54,000 by the RNoAF and 10,000 by the Norwegian Aero Club. The municipality and the air force agreed to jointly cover the operating costs. The airport originally received a 600-meter (2,000 ft) runway and a 120-meter (390 ft) apron. Construction was carried out by the military. The airport was opened on 17 November 1950. A further extension was started in 1952, and the airport could opened on 25 June 1953 with an extended 920-meter (3,020 ft) runway. This allowed the airport to handle de Havilland Heron and Douglas DC-3 aircraft. The extension improved the air force's ability to use the airport for emergency landings.

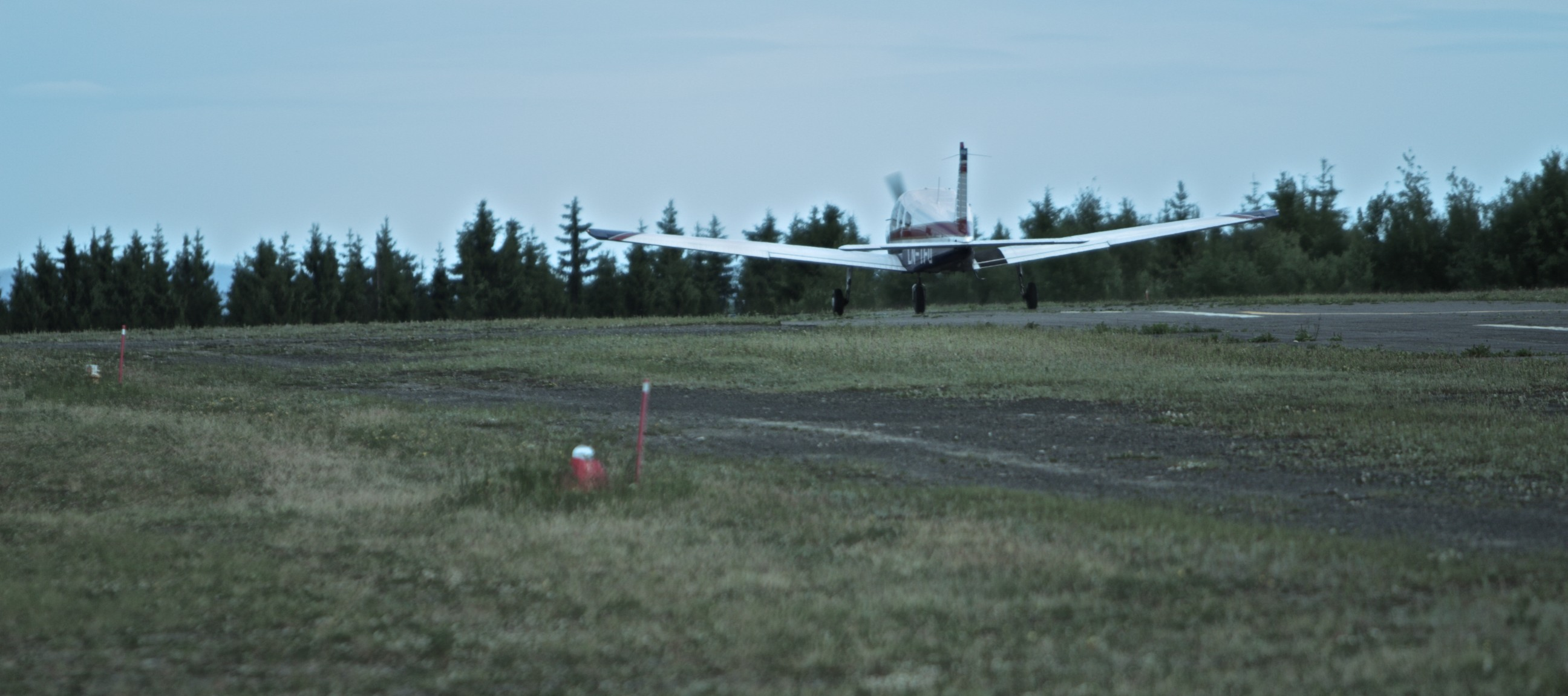
Aircraft on the runway

Braathens SAFE started flying scheduled services to Hamar from 16 May 1956, using de Havilland Herons. Hamar was an intermediate stop on the route between Oslo Airport, Fornebu and Trondheim Airport, Værnes, which also called at Røros Airport. Braathens remained until 1958, when they replace the Herons with the larger Fokker F27 Friendships on the route. These could not land on the short runway at Stafsberg, so Hamar was dropped from the service. Braathens stated that they never made any money from operating at Hamar. As a short-time replacement, Solbergfly started a route which connected Notodden Airport, Tuven with Oslo and Hamar, using a Cessna 310. However, the route was abandoned after a single season.

Flytransport was established at the airport in 1964 and operated taxi flights and an aviation school, specializing in helicopter training. During the following decade there was a large increase in the demand for pilots, particularly for helicopters, driven by the increased offshore petroleum activity. Flytransport grew to become the largest aviation school in the country. At its peak the company had fixed-wing aircraft, four helicopters and ten instructor pilots. It trained between ninety and one hundred pupils per year. It was joined by Helilift in 1966, which established its own helicopter school and taxi flights. As these two companies were established at the airport, they and the aviation club Hamar Flyklubb took over a large part of the operating responsibility. At the beginning of the 1970s there were more than thirty people working at the airport.

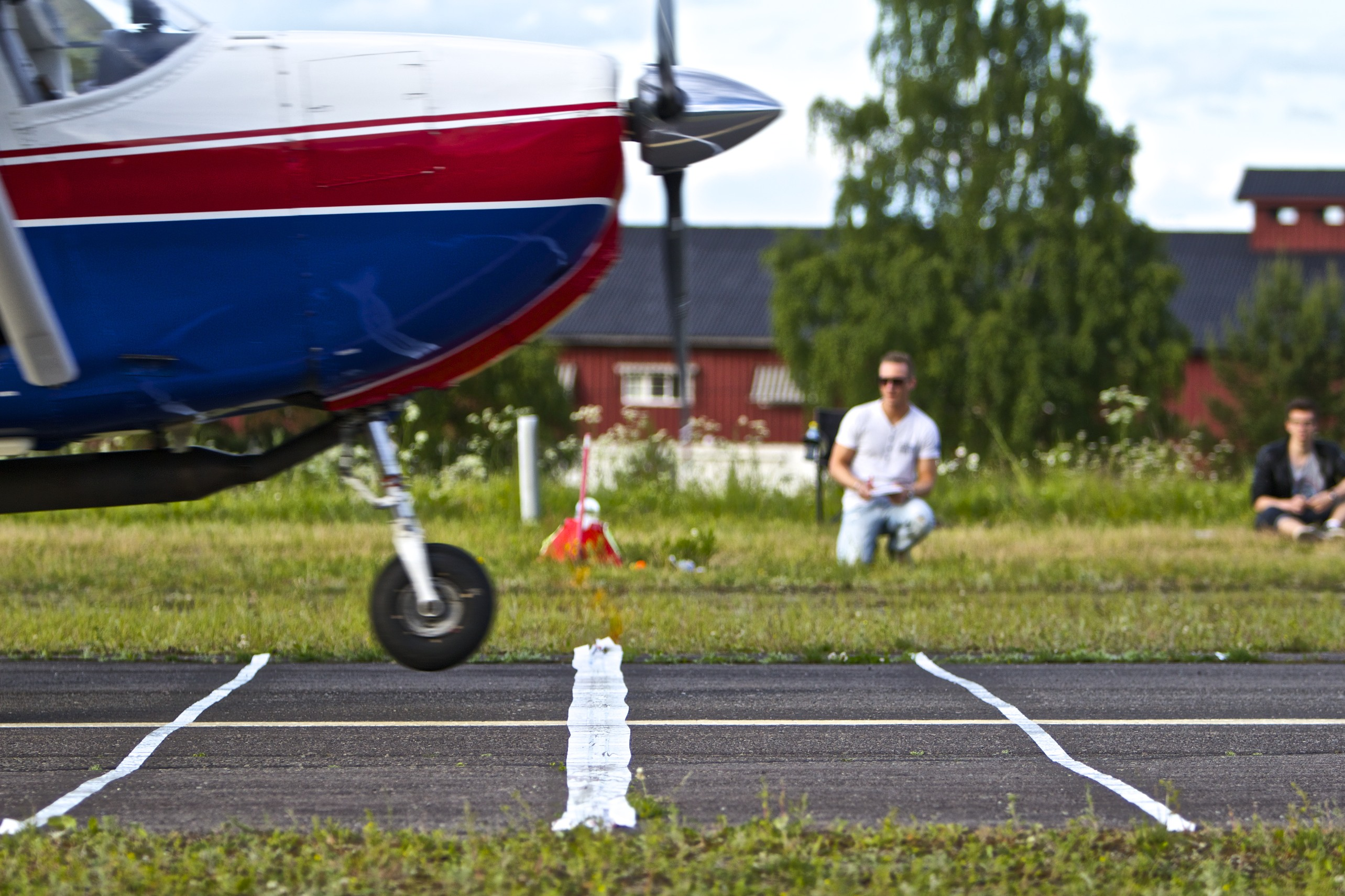
Aircraft participating at a landing contest at the airport

During the early 1980s the government was considering building a regional short take-off and landing airport in the Mjøsa area. One possibility was using Stafsberg. Widerøe announced plans in 1983 to start flights to Hamar, initially by carrying out a test landing with a de Havilland Canada Dash 7. Sufficient upgrade to the airport would cost ca. ten million krone, but a decision was made more complicated due to the airport being located in three municipalities. The same year Ringsaker Municipality started planning a regional airport at Rudshøgda. With the 1984 opening of the Mjøsa Bridge, it would be located between the three major towns of Lillehammer, Hamar and Gjøvik. Rudshøgda was supported by Hedmark County Council in February 1984. The airport at Rudshøgda was approved by Parliament later that year, causing the Ministry of Transport and Communications to halt all support to Stafsberg. Hamar Municipality responded by not wanting to participate in the airport at Rudshøgda.

The municipality took initiative to cover the costs to upgrade Stafsberg to allow scheduled services in 1985. Costing NOK 800,000, The upgrades included upgrades to the tower and establishment of a terminal building. Widerøe was in August 1986 awarded a concession to operate flights from Hamar to Oslo, Trondheim and Bergen Airport, Flesland, using de Havilland Canada Twin Otters. The ministry simultaneously rejected a joint route application from Norsk Flytjeneste and Trønderfly. The route to Oslo and Bergen commenced on 12 November; after two months Widerøe stated that they were happy with the patronage to Bergen, but no to Oslo. Due to low patronage, the last flights to Oslo and Trondheim were carried out on 27 November 1987. At the same time the airline increased their services to Bergen. However, Widerøe terminated the Bergen route on 17 June 1988, citing that they were not able to make money on the route.

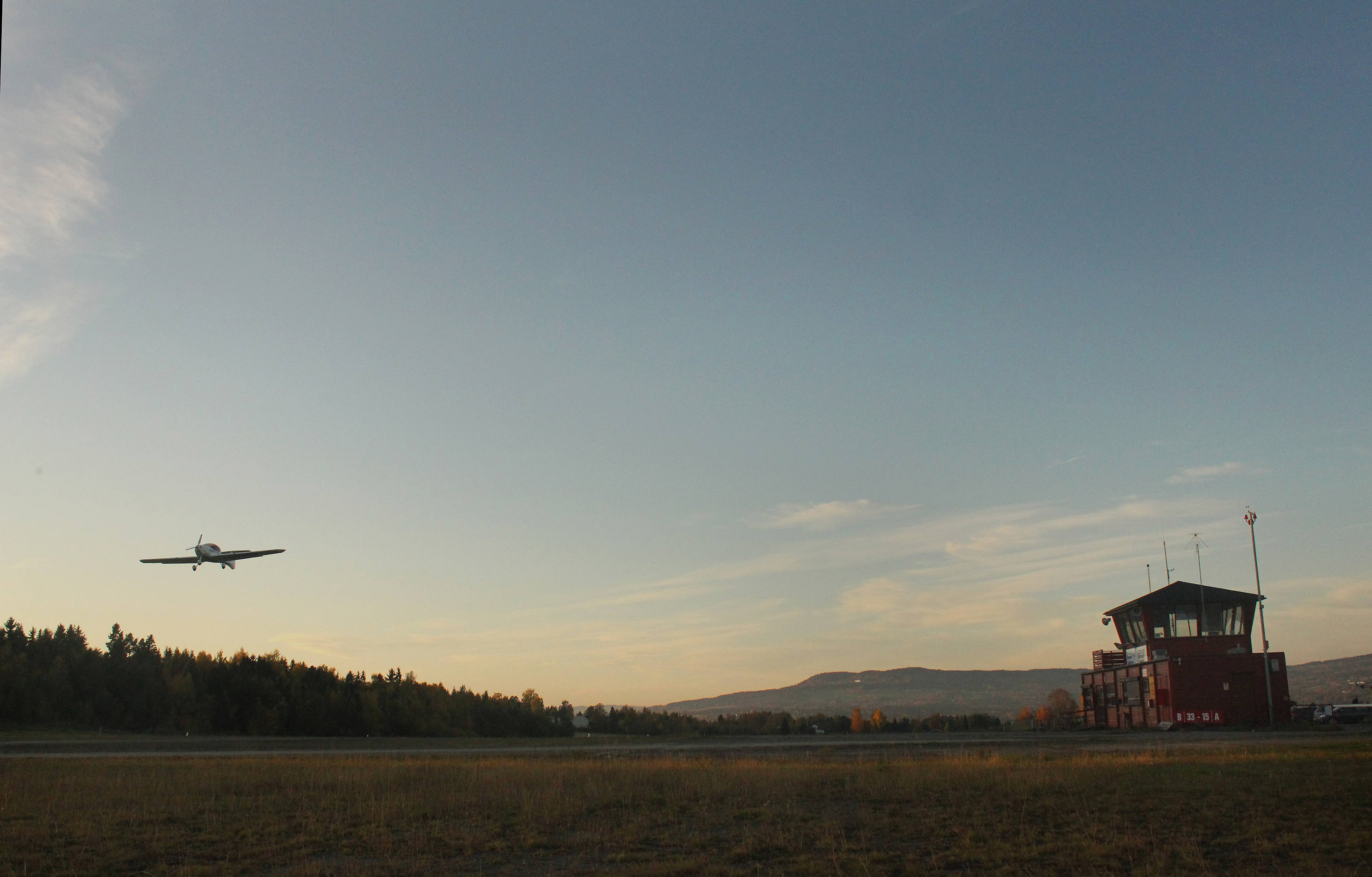
The runway and control tower. An airplane can be seen taking off

By then the aviation company Scan-Craft, originally known as Lyslid Flyservice, had started an aircraft maintenance service at Stavsberg. The announced immediately after Widerøe's termination notification that they would apply to operate a route from Hamar to Bergen, using a Dornier 228. The concession from Hamar to Bergen and Trondheim was awarded on 21 September 1988, allowing to daily flights to Bergen and one to Trondheim. The services lasted until August 1989, when the company filed for bankruptcy. Hamar Fly was incorporated in March 1995 with the intention of resuming the route to Bergen. Services commenced on 25 September with four weekly flights in each direction. However, the route was later terminated.

== Facilities ==
Hamar Airport, Stafsberg is located at Stafsberg, 1 nautical mile (1.9 km; 1.2 mi) north of Hamar at an elevation of 217 meters (712 ft) above mean sea level. It has an asphalt runway aligned 15–33 (roughly north–south) which measures 944 by 23 meters (3,097 by 75 ft), and with a declared length of 800 meters (2,600 ft). The airport only service general aviation and the main tenants are the aviation club Hedmark Flyklubb and the parachuting club HaGL Fallskjermklubb.

The airport has particularly good weather conditions for aviation. The high elevation and stable climate results in little fog. There is seldom wind and there is normally only a slight wind drag which runs along the length of the runway, aiding aircraft in take-off and landing.
