= Agderfly =

Norwegian flight school and airline

IATA	ICAO	Call sign
—	AGD	AGDERFLY
- Founded: 1966
- Ceased operations: 2004
- Operating bases: Kristiansand Airport, Kjevik
- Headquarters: Kristiansand, Norway
- Key people: Ola Rustenberg (owner)

Agderfly AS was a flight school and airline based in Kristiansand, Norway, which operated from 1966 to 2004. Originally based in Froland Municipality, since 1969 it operated out of Kristiansand Airport, Kjevik. Agderfly was owned by Ola Rustenberg, who was also chief instructor. From 1989 to 1992 the company was split into three, with one part responsible for scheduled services. It operated two Dornier 228 and flew services from Kristiansand to Gothenburg, Billund and Bremen.

== History ==
Agderfly was established by Ola Rustenberg when he bought a Jodel D.120 in 1966. The airline was initially based at Trevann in Froland Municipality. Two years later it bought a second aircraft, a Malmö MFI-9B, and started using it for pilot training. Agderfly relocated to Kjevik in 1969.

An accident in 1974 caused Agderfly to replace its MFI with a Beagle Pup. It was replaced with a Robin DR400 three years later. It was supplemented with a Piper Cherokee in 1979. The same year the company built a hangar. This allowed the operations to expand. First a Partenavia P.68 was bought, then replaced with two Piper Seneca. Agderfly signed a contract to fly patients from Vest-Agder Central Hospital to Oslo in 1980.

During the early 1980s Agderfly shifted its business model. A cooperation was started with Skjelbreds Rederi and the aviation company changed its name to A/S Nortrans Agderfly. During this period the Senecas were sold and replaced with a Piper Navajo and a Piper Aztec. For a period it also leased a Mitsubishi MU-2. Rustenstad bought back the part of the company he did not own in 1985 and changed the name back to Agderfly. The MU2 was sold in 1987 and replaced with a Bellanca Super Decathlon and a Socata Rallye. During this period the pilot school specialized in converting military pilots to civilian certificates, and offered commercial B, C and D licenses.

The partnership with Skjelbred resulted in Agderfly seeking to establish itself as a scheduled airline. It applied in for concession to operate to Gothenburg from Kristiansand. This was rejected by the Ministry of Transport and Communications in 1986, citing Scandinavian Airlines System's monopoly on inter-Scandinavian routes. However, the regulations were gradually being deregulated an on 13 November 1987 the airline was granted its concession.

Agderfly went through a major restructuring to operate the service. It was split into three operating companies, one for the school, one for the mechanical services and one for the passenger flights. This resulted in the ownership in the flight company being spread out between a series of local investors. Svein Grødum had in late 1989 a 40 percent ownership, while Thor Tjøntveit owned 30 percent. Minor owners were Leif Hubert, Oddleiv Eidjord and Einar Øgrey. Twice in 1989 the company issued new shares, increasing its share capital from 1 to 2 million Norwegian krone (NOK).

It opted in late 1988 to buy two Dornier 228 for Norving for the route. The same year it received permission to operate a route to Billund Airport in Denmark. The service to Göteborg Landvetter Airport commenced on 26 September 1989, followed by the Billund route on 2 October.

Eidjord became the majority shareholder of the flight company in September 1990, after buying shares from among others Tjøntveit and Grødum. Agderfly received concession to operate from Kristiansand to Bremen Airport and started these flights in early 1991. In early 1991 the airline wet leased its aircraft to the Ministry of Foreign Affairs to fly relief aid to Turkey and Iran. This and other chapter operations were profitable for the company, while the scheduled services ran at a loss.

Eidfjord sold his share of the company and Air Express to Petter Ringvold in May 1991. He reorganized the companies so that Agderfly became a subsidiary of Air Express. By September only the Gothenburg route was still being flown, and even it was incurring a loss of NOK 100,000 per month. The airline was futile in its attempts to receive municipal subsidies to cover the operating losses. Agderfly's flight company filed for bankruptcy on 21 November 1991, citing that it was operating with a loss. At the time it had fourteen employees.

Agderfly's school program was based on that the first part of the theory was taken as correspondence and the second part at the school, a system that had been in place since 1977. The Civil Aviation Administration (CAA) reacted to this in 1990, stating that the correspondence system was not in line with regulations. They did not react to that part of the courses were taken as correspondence, but rather the amount of the material which followed this material. They therefore withdrew Agderfly's approval in 1990. This hindered them from taking up a grade of pupils, costing them in excess of NOK 1 million.

The school felt that the CAA were not following procedure and sued them. They lost the case in three instances. However, in 1996 the Ministry of Transport and Communication stated that the CAA had not followed procedure when closing the school. Agderfly was fined for use of an unapproved aircraft part in 1994. Following the global decline of the airline market and pilot demand from 2001 and onwards, Agderfly failed to fill its courses. By 2004 operations in Agderfly had ceased, although not liquidated. Rustenberg continued to pursue possibilities to reestablish a pilot school at Kjevik. The first steps for such approval were granted in 2008, although this was carried on in another company.

== Fleet ==
The following aircraft were operated by Agderfly:

Agderfly aircraft
Model	Qty	Built	First in	Last out	Ref(s)
Jodel D.120	1	1958	1966	1972	
Malmö MFI-9B	2	1964	1968	1974	
Beagle Pup	1	1969	1974	1977	
Robin DR400	1	1976	1977	1978	
Piper Cherokee	2	1976	1977	2001	
Piper Chieftain	1	1978	1980	1990	
Piper Tomahawk	1	1979	1980	1985	
Piper Seneca	1	1971	1985	1987	
Fuji FA-200 Aero Subaru	1	1985	1986	1996	
Socata Rallye	1	1980	1987	1993	
Grumman Cougar	1	1977	1987	?	
Bellanca Super Decathlon	1	1978	1987	1998	
Dornier 228	2	1984–85	1989	1992	

== Accidents and incidents ==
- A Piper Seneca crashed and was written off at Jonsknuten on 16 November 1984.
- A Socata Rallye crashed at Brekkestø on 26 September 1993 during a school flight. Both people on board swam to shore, but the pupil, training for his instructor license, died later that evening of hypothermia.

== Bibliography ==
- Bakken, Rolf; Jæger, Ingrid W.; Krageboen, Sven (1989). Kr.sand lufthavn, Kjevik 50 år 1939–1989 (in Norwegian). Kristiansand. ISBN 82-991887-0-9.
- Hagby, Kay (1998). Fra Nielsen & Winther til Boeing 747 (in Norwegian). Drammen: Hagby. ISBN 8299475201.
