= Notodden Airport =

Airport in Telemark, Norway

Notodden Airport Notodden lufthavn
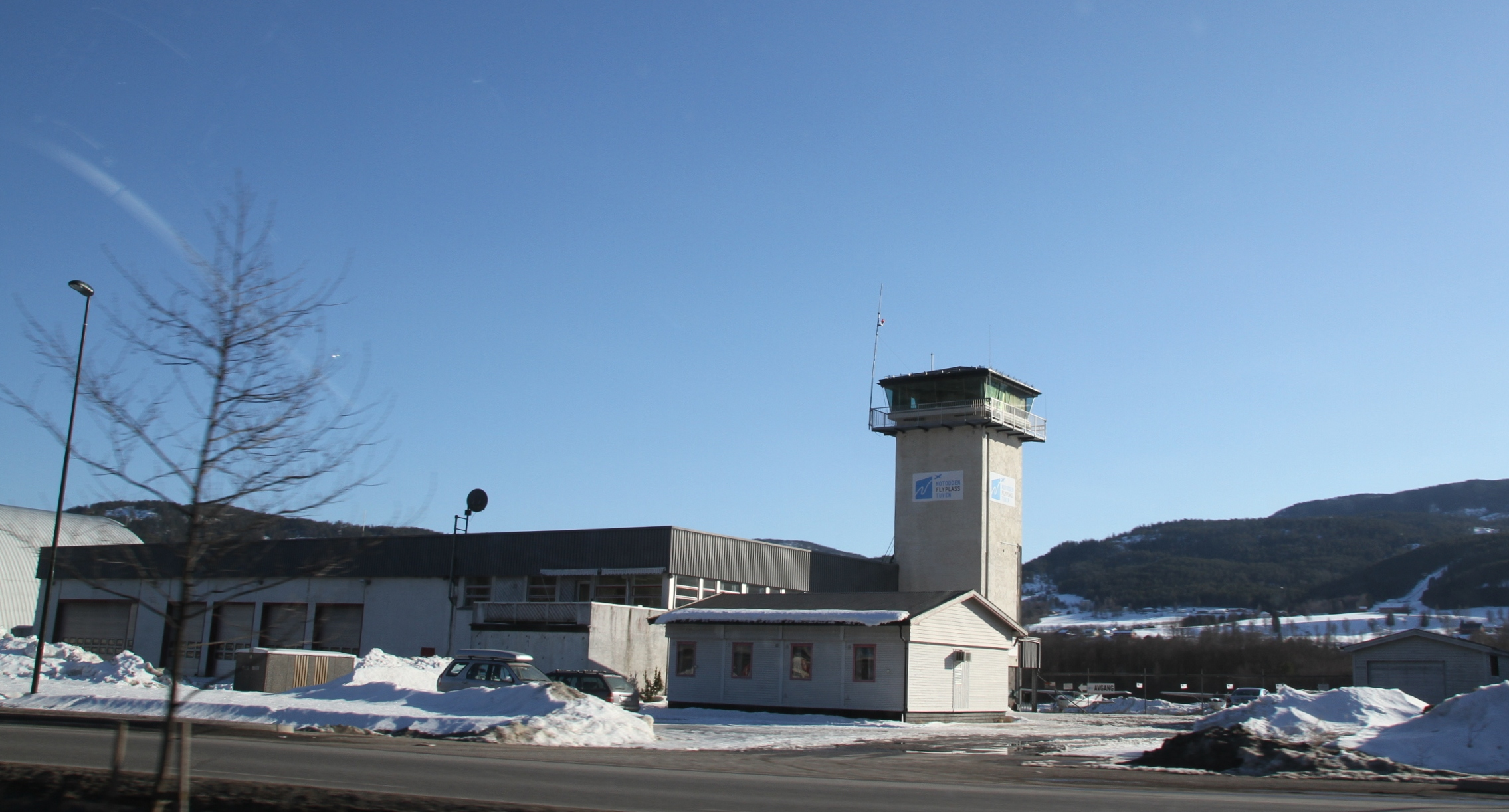
- IATA: NTB; ICAO: ENNO

Summary
- Airport type: Public
- Owner: Notodden Municipality
- Operator: Notodden Lufthavn AS
- Serves: Notodden Municipality, Telemark, Norway
- Location: Tuven, Notodden
- Elevation AMSL: 19 m (62 ft)
- Coordinates: 59°33′56″N 009°12′44″E
- Website: www.notoddenlufthavn.no

Map
- Location within Norway

Runways
| Direction | Length | | Surface |
| Direction | m | ft | Surface |
|---|---|---|---|
| 12/30 | 1,393 | 4,570 | Asphalt |

Statistics (2011)
- Passengers: 3,423
- Aircraft Movements: 5,078
- Cargo (tonnes): 1
- Source: Norwegian AIP at Avinor; Statistics from Avinor

Notodden Airport (Norwegian: Notodden lufthavn; IATA: NTB, ICAO: ENNO) is a municipal regional airport at Heddal in Notodden Municipality in Telemark county, Norway. The airport is mostly used for general aviation, and has extensive sailplane activity. In 2011, the airport had 5,078 aircraft movements and 3,423 passengers. The airport has a single 1,393-by-40-meter (4,570 by 131 ft) runway with flight information service and instrument landing system. In connection with the airport is a water aerodrome, which uses the lake of Heddalsvatnet for take-off and landing.

The airport was opened in 1955, and the following year Braathens SAFE started services to Oslo and Stavanger. Low patronage forced the airline to abandon the route in 1959. In 1968, the runway was extended and the municipality hoped to establish charter services, but these never realized. Partnair started flights to Oslo and Stavanger in 1985, but these were terminated less than a year later, again due to low patronage. In 1998, Air Team started flights to Oslo and Stavanger, which were replaced by Bergen Air Transport services to Bergen from 2000.

== History ==
The first plans for an airport serving Notodden were launched in 1954 by Reidar Hedwig-Dahl, director of the tourist office. In late 1954 or early 1955, he held a meeting with Ludvig G. Braathen, owner of Braathens SAFE, and representatives for his airline. They saw Notodden as a possible gateway to Telemark and Braathen promised to start flying to an airport serving Notodden, should one be built. At the time, Braathen had started flying to several smaller airports in Norway using a fleet of de Havilland Heron aircraft. Braathen had been traveling around Norway and encouraging municipalities to build regional airports, stating that he wanted more but smaller airports than the central authorities were planning. He succeeded at having similar airports built in Hamar and Røros.

The issue was first discussed politically on 23 April 1955. The municipalities of Heddal and Notodden reached an agreement concerning financing and ownership the airport, whereby Notodden would own seven elevenths and Heddal four elevenths of the airport. Construction of the airport cost 200,000 Norwegian krone (NOK), which included a 1,000-by-40-meter (3,280 by 130 ft) runway. This was sufficient for the Herons, but the plans included the possibility to extend the runway by another 240 meters (790 ft) to allow landing by larger aircraft, such as the Douglas DC-3. Construction took seven and a half months, and the airport opened on 11 November 1955. The operating costs were estimated at NOK 17,850 for the first year. This excluded air traffic control, which was covered by the state.

Braathens SAFE started test flights on 14 March 1956, with the service taking 20 minutes from Oslo Airport, Fornebu. The scheduled service was inaugurated on 21 May as a stop on Braathens SAFE's route between Oslo and Stavanger Airport, Sola. Passengers could travel twice each day to both airports, with tickets costing NOK 30. The service was seasonal and only flown during the summer half of the year. Notodden Airport proved to have too few passengers, resulting in the route being terminated after the end of the 1958 season. The last season, the service was operated by Thor Solberg on contract with Braathens SAFE. From 1959, Solberg started with a two-month service with six weekly round trips to Fornebu, after securing a NOK 5,000 guarantee from the municipality to cover any losses. The route was abandoned after the single season.

General aviation activities at the airport gradually increased. In the early 1960s, sailplanes became popular at the airport. The aerodrome is located with good wind and air pressure conditions for sailplane flying, and Oslo Flyklubb stationed two of its sailplanes at Tuven. Ronald Stensrud established a pilot school in 1966, but was forced to close after failing to make ends meet.

In 1967, Notodden Municipality granted NOK 900,000 and Telemark County Municipality granted NOK 600,000 for the runway to be extended to 1,400 meters (4,600 ft). The new section of runway was laid down to Heddalsvatnet. At the same time, the gravel runway was asphalted. This was sufficient to allow Fokker F-27 Friendship and Convair CV-440 Metropolitan to operate. The plan was to serve international charter flights during winter, which would bring tourists to neighboring mountain resorts. During a time when there was a heated political debate over state grants to airport, Notodden was the only airport which had expanded without any central grants. The airport never succeeded at attracting any regular charter services.

The opening was planned for 18 October 1968, but was delayed to the following year after the airport was flooded a week before the scheduled date. The construction work resulted in a legal dispute between the municipality and the consulting company Norsk Teknisk Byggekontroll. The initial filling of earthwork had proved insufficient, so additional earthwork had to be filled, costing an additional NOK 840,000. The municipality demanded that the consulting company cover NOK 250,000 of the extra cost.

In 1979, Det Norske Helikoperskole started Norway's first helicopter pilot school at the airport. This was met with protests from the neighbors, who were affected by noise pollution all day long. The municipality was sued by 600 locals who wanted to prohibit the school from operating. During an air show in 1983, the airport was visited by a Boeing 737-200 from Braathens SAFE and General Dynamics F-16 Fighting Falcon from the Royal Norwegian Air Force.

In March 1985, Partnair was granted concession for scheduled services from Fornebu via Notodden to Stavanger. The route was started on 15 August using a ten-seat Beechcraft 200 Super King Air and flew twice a day, five days a week. This route was made possible after an instrument landing system was installed at the airport. The NOK 2 million cost had been paid for by Norsk Hydro, while Tinfos had paid NOK 100,000 for new landing lights. The upgrades also included a new terminal, which included a café in the second story and seating for 14 people. Ticket sales and check-in was managed by NSB Reisebyrå, a subsidiary of the Norwegian State Railways. After five months, Partnair had lost NOK 1.2 million on the route. In average, they were selling three to four tickets per flight to Stavanger, and one to Oslo. From March 1986, the leg from Notodden to Oslo was dropped and the service to Stavanger reduced. However, the route proved unprofitable and was eventually terminated later the same month.

As part of the Oslo Airport location controversy, after the new airport was decided located to Gardermoen, there was a public discussion as to what to do with the general aviation which had operated from Fornebu. While some local aircraft owners wanted to keep a small part of Fornebu for general aviation, the authorities decided to close the airport completely. Instead, the general aviation was distributed to various private airports in Eastern Norway, including Notodden. In May 1998, Air Team started flights from Notodden to Bergen. Air Team gradually moved all its operations, including its pilot school, to Notodden. After Fornebu was closed in October, the airline experienced a quadrupling of patronage, as Gardermoen had given longer travel time for people in Buskerud and Telemark. In addition to business travel, the airline catered offshore workers commuting to the North Sea via Bergen. The airline stated that it intended to also open routes to Stavanger and Copenhagen.

In 1999, the British airport operator TBI announced it was in negotiations to purchase an airport close to Oslo, and Dagens Næringsliv speculated that it could be Notodden. The municipality confirmed that they were in negotiations to establish a limited company to operate the airport, which would be jointly owned by Air Team and the municipality. In 2000, Bergen Air Transport started flying between Notodden and Bergen, using a Cessna 421B. It transported 1,000 passengers in 2000, and 1,500 the following year. During the summer of 2002, the company also attempted to fly from Notodden to Kristiansund Airport, Kvernberget, but was forced to give up due to lack of passengers. In 1995, the airport saw 770 arriving and departing passengers. It increased to 2,467 the following year but fell to 986 in 1998 before increasing to 3,682 in 1999. The patronage has since varied significantly from year to year, but has stayed in the range between 1,500 and 3,500 passengers per year.

On 20 November 2003, Notodden Airport was closed for all scheduled traffic by the Norwegian Civil Aviation Authority, due to a not conforming with safety requirements. Bergen Air Transport was forced to reroute all its aircraft to Skien Airport, Geiteryggen. Following an investment of NOK 500,000 from the airline and NOK 1.2 million from the municipality, scheduled services could commence. The municipality had ambitions to upgrade the airport to a higher standard, which would allow it to serve charter aircraft weighing more than 5.7 tonnes (5.6 long tons; 6.3 short tons) and with more than nine passengers. The plans were abandoned after 11 neighboring municipalities rejected giving grants for the necessary technical upgrades. Notodden Municipality instead started a program to increase the popularity of the airport by targeting companies in the neighboring municipality of Kongsberg to encourage use of the airport, instead of going to Oslo Airport, Gardermoen and Sandefjord Airport, Torp. Another NOK 250,000 was invested from 1 October 2004 to keep meet safety requirements. Starting in October 2004, security control was introduced. In September 2007, the Bergen Air Transport bought a new hangar at Notodden, giving it ample space for expansion, and new arrival and departure facilities.

Larger airports in the region are Oslo-Gardermoen, 166 km and over 2 hours away by road, and Sandefjord 110 km away.

== Facilities ==
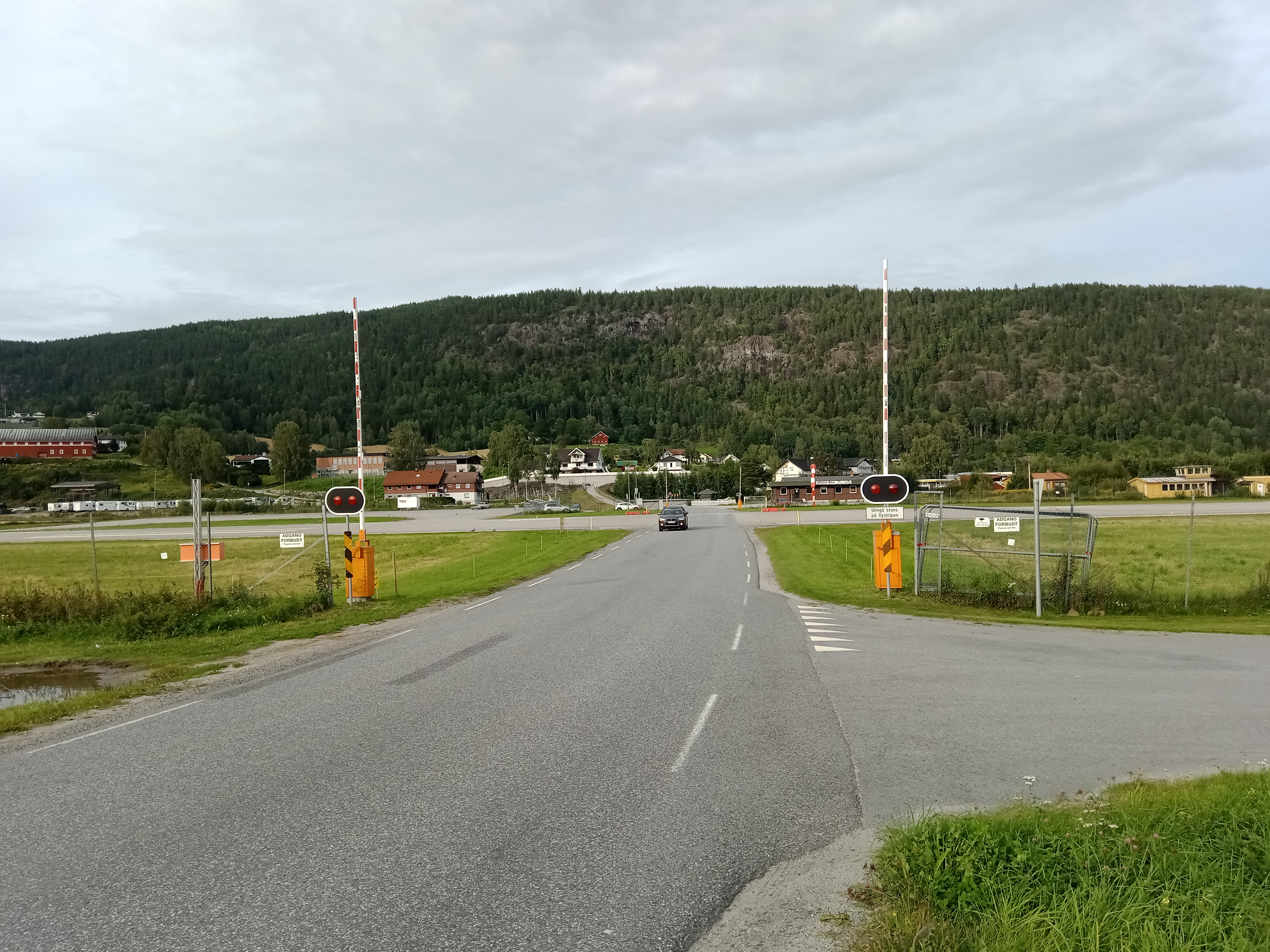
The road crossing.

The airport consists of a 1,393 by 40 meters (4,570 by 131 ft) asphalted runway aligned 12–30. County Road 152 crosses the runway, forcing the road to close when the full length runway is in use. It has a flight information service (AFIS) and is located 19 meters (62 ft) above mean sea level. It has category 3 fire fighting and a rescue vessel. The airport is equipped with an instrument landing system. In connection with the airport lies a water aerodrome, which uses Heddalsvatnet for landing and take-off. The area for landing and take-off is 1,000 by 100 meters (3,280 by 330 ft) and has the same center-line as the runway.

The airport is operated by the limited company Notodden Lufthavn AS, which is again owned by Notodden Municipality. Tuven is dominated by general aviation, in part organized by Notodden flyklubb and Kongsberg flyklubb. In 2010, the airport had 5,078 aircraft movements and 3,423 passengers, making it the scheduled airport in Norway with the fewest passengers. Flyteknisk, a retailer and maintainer of Cessna aircraft, including seaplanes, is based at the airport.

== Airlines and destinations ==
As of 24 June 2022, there are no regularly scheduled flights.
