= Fjellfly =

Norwegian regional airline

- Founded: 1954
- Ceased operations: 1972
- Operating bases: Skien Airport, Geiteryggen
- Fleet size: 14 (1965)
- Destinations: 4
- Headquarters: Skien, Norway
- Key people: Snorre and Reidun Kjetilsson (owners)

Fjellfly (literally "Mountain Fly") was a Norwegian airline which operated between 1954 and 1972. The airline was based at Skien Airport, Geiteryggen and served a diverse range of general aviation activities and a limited scheduled services. Major undertakings included distribution of the newspaper Dagbladet, flying tourists into mountainous areas such as Hardangervidda and crop dusted forest areas. A scheduled service was introduced from Skien to Oslo Airport, Fornebu in 1963, and was extended to Sandefjord Airport, Torp and Hamar Airport, Stafsberg four years later. At its peak in 1965, the airline had a fleet of fourteen aircraft.

Owned by Snorre and Reidun Kjetilson, the airline was established in 1954 in Drammen. Operations started out of Skien the following year. In addition to a range of Cessna, Piper, Fairchild and other smaller aircraft, Fjellfly operated the 10-passenger Noorduyn Norseman for most of its existence. From the mid-1960s it introduced the 16-passenger Scottish Aviation Twin Pioneer on the scheduled flights, at the time the only aircraft of such a size that could land at Geiteryggen. From 1967, the airline started flying out of Vest-Telemark Airport, Fyresdal and established a pilot school at Kristiansand Airport, Kjevik. With the runway at Geiteryggen extended in 1970, the airline went over the de Havilland Heron on the scheduled services. Fjellfly filed for bankruptcy in 1972.

== History ==
The airline was established by Snorre Sturla Kjetilson and his wife Reidun. Originally from Rjukan, Snorre lived in Drammen when he decided to take his pilots' license. Along with an investor, Kjetilson bought a Cessna 180 from Thor Solberg in 1954 and established Drammen Flyselskap. The investor quickly lost faith in the airline and sold his share to Kjetilson. To secure sufficient business, he contacted several newspapers, and agreed to fly Dagbladet from Oslo to the Grenland area daily. From 1955 the airline flew from the seaplane aerodrome at Oslo Airport, Fornebu to Herøya in Porsgrunn and onwards to Hjellevatnet in Skien. Later in the year, wheels were mounted on the aircraft, and it started flying to Geiteryggen. Geiteryggen became the airline's base, and the Kjetilsons moved to Skien in 1957.

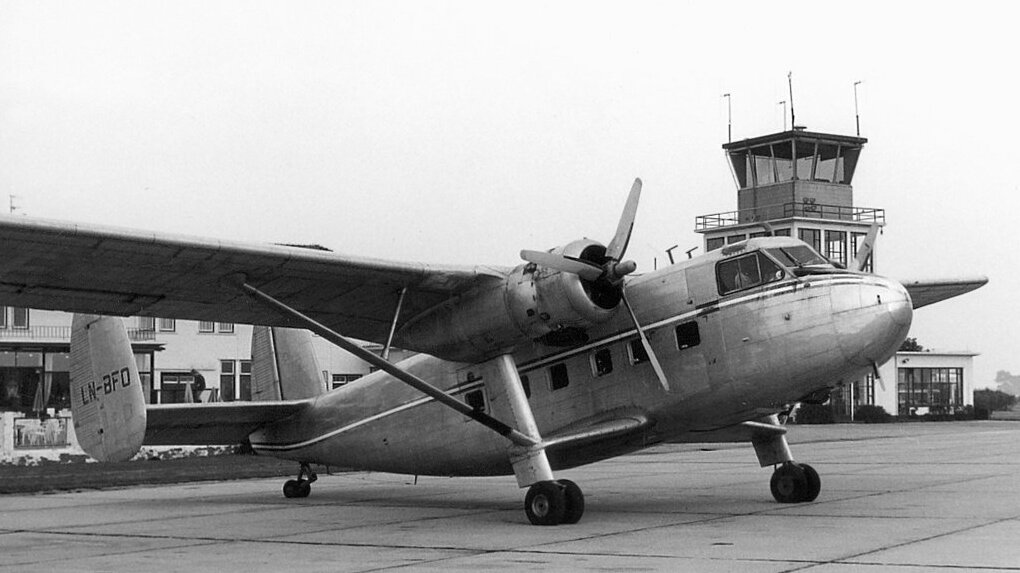
A Twin Pioneer at Groningen Airport

The airline took delivery of a used Scottish Aviation Twin Pioneer on 3 September 1963. The remainder of the year the aircraft was grounded at Geiteryggen for an overhaul. Among the planned uses of the aircraft had originally been crop dusting, but this was never carried out. The aircraft's test flight took place on 24 April 1964 and the aircraft entered service on 2 May, flying FC Odd to Bergen to play a football match. In addition to charter, the 16-passenger aircraft was sometimes used on the round trips to Oslo. Fjellfly was the only Norwegian operator of the Twin Pioneer.

Fjellfly received permission to operate a scheduled "line taxi" service from Skien to Fornebu. This implied that the route was flown with less administrative work, but limited the size of the aircraft. The services started on 1 March 1963 using the Twin Pioneer. At the time, only a single pilot in the country had the necessary type rating for the aircraft. The Twin Pioneer was expensive, having high fuel consumption, high maintenance costs and slow speed. In addition, it had too high capacity for the Fornebu route. Kjetilson considered purchasing the de Havilland Dove, but no deal was struck. A scheduled service from Skien via Sandefjord Airport, Torp and Oslo Airport, Fornebu to Hamar Airport, Stafsberg was established from 2 May 1967.

Kjetilson was one of the driving forces behind Vest-Telemark Airport, Fyresdal. He had faith in that the area was superb for tourism and told Telemark Arbeiderblad on 16 September 1967 that he would donate the airline to the municipality if Fyresdal did not have continental traffic within two years. The airport opened on 23 September. Fjellfly established a pilot school at Kristiansand Airport, Kjevik the same year. With the upgrading of Geiteryggen to a longer, paved runway, the airline started looking for a more economical aircraft. In 1969, Fjellfly bought a de Havilland Heron from Tokyo, Japan, and flew it home, arriving in February 1970. After a minor renovation, which included a renewal of the interior, the aircraft was put into service in the scheduled traffic.

A second Heron was bought in 1971 and registered on 10 February 1972. However, it would never enter service. By March Fjellfly was bankrupt. As Geiteryggen was operated by the airline, the airfield also closed, but was soon reopened. After the bankruptcy the aviation authorities were criticized for giving the schedule concession in 1967 to Fjellfly, as the privilege was granted based on rural politics concessions while the company did not have sufficient financial security to operate the route.

== Operations ==
Newspaper flying was one of the airline's main contracts. Dagbladet and Verdens Gang, the two main non-subscription newspapers, had a fierce competition to bring their newspapers first to the market. Fjellfly had a contract to distribute Dagbladet from Oslo to Hamar, Tønsberg, Sandefjord, Skien, Kristiansand, Stavanger, Bergen and Trondheim. If weather conditions did not allow visual flight rules, the latter four would be transported by scheduled services instead. In extreme cases where the weather did not allow flights to the airports in Eastern Norway, Fjellfly was responsible for distributing the newspaper by road.

To supplement the newspaper flights, Kjetilson started a systematic campaign to fly tourist into the mountain areas of Hardangervidda and Setesdalsheiene. The airline established a summer base at Møsvatn. The Cessna 180 was equipped with hydraulic skis, allowing the aircraft to land both on runways and frozen lakes. The peak period was during the hunting season in September. The airline also flew a route with Dagbladet which it dropped at about 65 hotels and resorts in a six- to seven-hour trip. By the 1960s, the airline flew a regular service Skien–Oslo–Sandefjord–Larvik–Skien.

From 1963 Fjellfly started crop dusting forests with fertilizer on a contract with Felleskjøpet. A Cessna 185 seaplane was bought for the job, which allowed it to be used for crop dusting in May and June, and for passenger flights the rest of the year. The first such flight took place on 3 May 1963. Although some of these operations took place from airstrips, most of the work was carried out using seaplanes. At the peak, four aircraft were used for crop dusting: two 185s, a Piper Super Cub and a Pilatus Porter. During the 1960s, Fjellfly had two domesticated bears which were held at the airport.

== Fleet ==
List of aircraft operated by Fjellfly
Aircraft	No.	Seats	Period	Ref
Cessna 150	2	5	1967–72	
Cessna 172A	2	4	1965–72	
Cessna 180	2	4	1955–65	
Cessna 185 Skywagon	3	6	1963–72	
Cessna 195	1	5	1957–68	
de Havilland Heron	2	17	1969–72	
Fairchild PT-19-FA Cornell	3	2	1957–66	
Fairchild PT-26B-FE Cornell	5	2	1956–66	
Noorduyn Norseman IV	4	11	1957–72	
North American Harvard IIB	2	2	1961–72	
Fieseler Fi 156 Storch	1	2	1959–62	
Piper J-3 Cub	1	2	1961–72	
Piper PA-18 Super Cub	1	2	1965–66	
Piper PA-22 Tri-Pacer	2	4	1959–68	
Piper PA-23 Apache	3	6	1962–71	
Piper PA-28-140 Cherokee Cruiser	3	2	1967–71	
Piper PA-31 Navajo	1	8	1972	
Piper PA-32 Cherokee Six	1	6	1968–72	
Scottish Aviation Twin Pioneer	2	16	1964–72	
