= Bergen Aviation =

Norwegian airline, 1981–1986

IATA	ICAO	Call sign
N/A	N/A	N/A
- Founded: 1981
- Ceased operations: 1986
- Fleet size: 1
- Parent company: Vesta (50%); Vestlandsreiser (20%)
- Headquarters: Bergen, Norway

A/S Bergen Aviation was a Norwegian airline that never operated any scheduled flights. Based in Bergen and established in 1981, it operated 2 Piper Cheyenne 2 turboprop for charter. It was originally established by the Bird Technology Group and was acquired by As Nevi in the Vestagroup in 1983. This was a time when SAS did not service Bergen well except Oslo and Copenhagen further adding to Flesland's decline as an important airport.

Later it signed an agreement to fly charter flights with Vestlandsreiser in 1986. It had also made an unsuccessful attempt to receive concession to operate domestic scheduled flights between Oslo Airport, Fornebu and Bergen Airport, Flesland. The airline bought 2 Sud Aviation Caravelle, but never received permission to operate. One Caravelle was severely damaged on take-off at Arlanda Airport in 1986 and left there for various kind of training for several years. The crash saved Bergen Aviation financially.

The company's largest owners in 1986 were Vesta and Vestlandsreiser.

== History ==
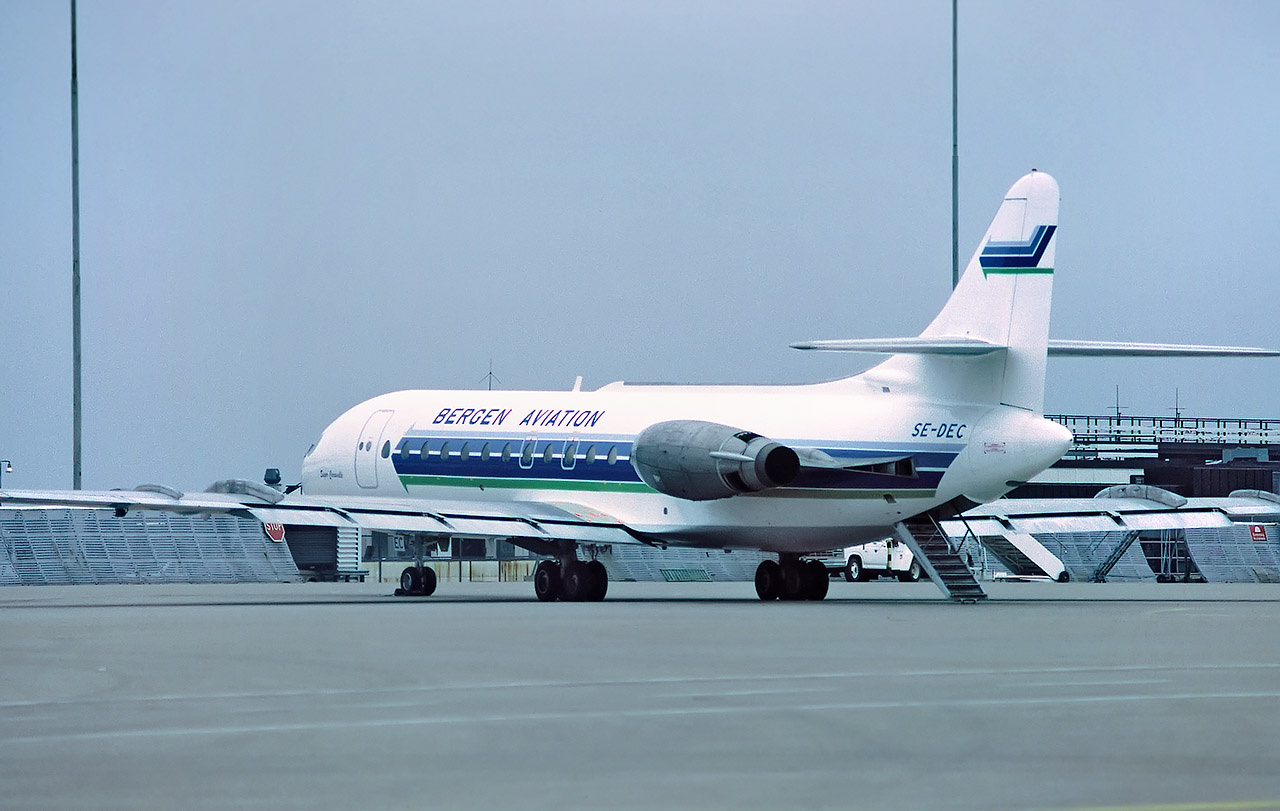
Bergen Aviation's Sud Aviation Caravelle at Stockholm-Arlanda Airport in May 1986

Bergen Aviation was originally established in 1981. In 1986 fifty percent of Bergen Aviation was owned by the Vesta Group, twenty percent was owned by Vestlandreiser, and the rest was owned by various companies based in Bergen. The airline's first contract was with charter tour operator Vestlandsreiser, which was scheduled to begin on 1 May 1986. The contract was secured after Vestlandsreiser on 30 January 1986 had announced that they would terminate their agreement with Swedish airline Transwede, citing the latter's repeated delays and cancellations. The contract consisted of services from Stavanger Airport, Sola; Bergen Airport, Flesland; Haugesund Airport, Karmøy; and Sandefjord Airport, Torp to Palma de Mallorca Airport, Spain and Crete, Greece. To operate the charter routes, Bergen Aviation bought a 99-seat Sud Aviation SE-210 Caravelle from Hispania Líneas Aéreas in January 1986, financed with a loan from Nevi.

On 10 February, Bergen Aviation announced that they had applied the Norwegian Civil Aviation Administration to operate a scheduled service between Flesland and Oslo Airport, Fornebu. At the time, Scandinavian Airlines System (SAS) had a monopoly on the route, which was Norway's busiest, carrying 2,000 to 3,000 passengers per day. Einar Falck, Vesta's chief executive officer, stated that the mechanics' strike which had recently hit SAS had shown how vulnerable the SAS monopoly was. He further stated that should Bergen Aviation receive concession, they would acquire Boeing 737 or Douglas DC-9 aircraft for the route, and the owner group would consider listing the company. The application was part of a trend among smaller Norwegian airlines to apply for the new route. At the time there were 42 pending applications from 15 airlines awaiting decision in the Ministry of Transport and Communications. The Progress Party's Youth supported Bergen Aviation's application at its national convention.

The airline sent an application to register the Caravelle in April, but the application was cancelled later in the month, and the aircraft was subsequently registered in Sweden. By June the airline had still not received permission to operate, causing problems for Vestlandsreiser, who had to make last-minute leases of aircraft, and had to terminate all flights from Stavanger.
