= Norsk Forurensningskontroll =

Specialized Norwegian aviation company

Norsk Forurensningskontroll AS
- Founded: 1983
- Ceased operations: 1986
- Operating bases: Bodø Airport; Hammerfest Airport; Kristiansund Airport, Kvernberget
- Fleet size: 4
- Headquarters: Bodø, Norway
- Key people: Harald Olsen (CEO)

Norsk Forurensningskontroll AS (literally "Norwegian Pollution Control") or NFK was a specialized Norwegian aviation company and aircraft operator, with a fleet of four de Havilland Canada DHC-6 Twin Otter aircraft. The company was founded in 1983 and initially intended to operate the aircraft to apply dispersants on oil spills at sea, as a part of the national oil spill defense system. However, due to oil companies, departemental and government politics the company failed to establish such a service and instead operated the aircraft for charter, before deciding to liquidate the company in the autumn of 1986. The airline had its main base at Bodø Airport, and was planning to establish oil-spill protection bases at Hammerfest Airport and Kristiansund Airport, Kvernberget. During its existence the company co-operated closely with Widerøe's Flyveselskap AS, which was approved by the authorities as the operators maintenance organization.

== History ==
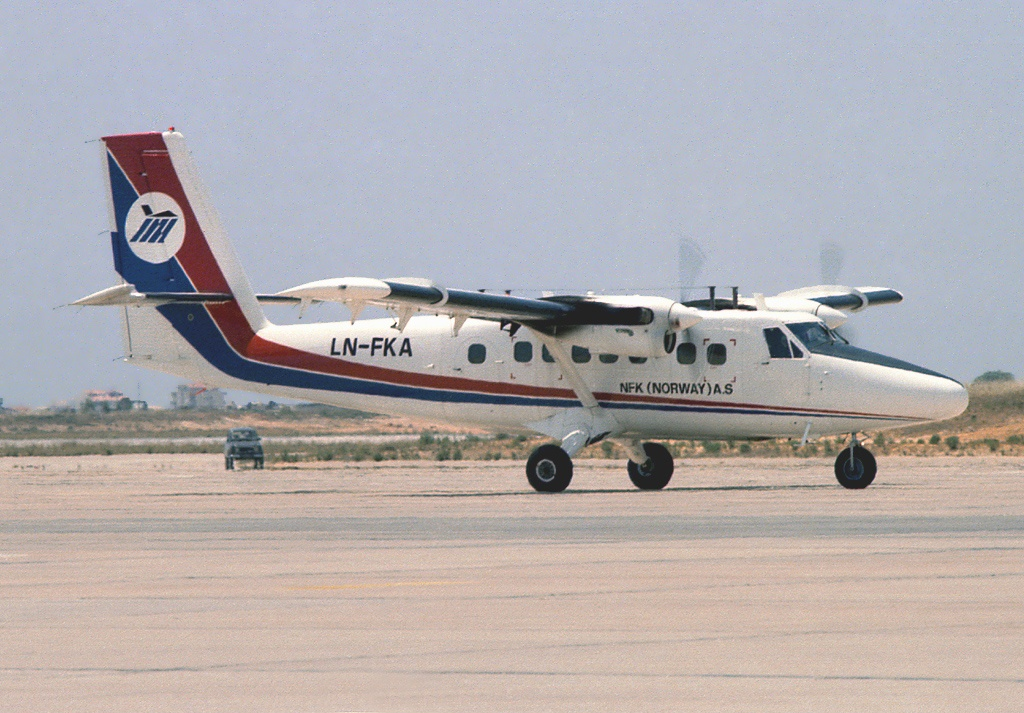
One of the airline's Twin Otters

The airline was established in 1983 with a share capital of NOK 50,000, and with Cpt. Harald Olsen as managing director. In November 1983, they announced to the authorities and the general public plans to establish a fleet of four DHC-6/300 Twin Otters, for the application of dispersant on oil spills at sea as part of the national oil spill protection system, as well as providing an airborne radar surveillance and positioning system. The government was initially favorable to the concept, particularly as an element in improving oil spill protection and response at sea, in conjunction with permitting the oil industry to commence exploration north of the 62nd parallel, but unfortunately government and departmental politics and the oil companies' unwillingness to contribute to the system, led to the company's demise.

The company aimed to have two aircraft operative in June 1984, and be fully operational with 35 to 40 employees and four aircraft by 1985, when all-year oil drilling would start in the Norwegian Sea. Use of aircraft for oil spill reduction was at the time established in the United Kingdom (Harvest Air Ltd.), and Norsk Forurensningskontroll aimed to create a similar preparedness for Norway in cooperation with the Norwegian Pollution Control Authority. The cost of the four aircraft was stipulated to approximately NOK 35 million. Operation started in May 1984 with an aircraft on dry lease from Widerøe (LN-BNS), which was also used as system development platform. The airline stated that they estimated having 30 to 50 operations per year.

In September, one of the aircraft was displayed at Farnborough Airshow, and Norsk Forurensningskontroll stated that they intended to sell the technology abroad. During the show NFK was contracted to Esso UK, for participation in a major exercise in Southampton later the same year.

The idea of having an oil spill services of this type was eventually abandoned by the authorities and by the oil industry, and instead NFK started using their aircraft for various charter purposes, such as bird counting for universities and parachuting.

In 1986, the company gained a contract with the French government for supplying a French–Canadian semi-military female expedition, aiming to traverse the polar basin from the northernmost tip of Svalbard to the North Pole on skis. The aircraft was based in Svalbard, and a number of other scientific and exploration expeditions were supported, including electronic mapping of the headrock underneath glaciers, under a contract for the Scott Polar Research Institute at the University Cambridge, financed by BP.

The company filed for bankruptcy in October 1986. At the time it had NOK 29 million in debt, while its assets were three Twin Otters with an estimated value of NOK 21 million. At the time, one plane was on lease to the national airline of Portugal ( TAP), flying scheduled operations on the archipelago of Madeira. The largest creditors were Sparebanken Nord, who was owed 13 million and had collateral in two aircraft, Sparebanken Nordland, who were owed NOK 11 million and had collateral in one aircraft, and Kredittkassen/Fiskernes Bank, who were owed NOK 1.9 million. The banks estimated they had lost NOK 8 million on the venture.

== Organization and aircraft ==
The company had its head office in Bodø and main base at Bodø Airport. It cooperated with Widerøe, also based in Bodø, for crews and maintenance services. The aircraft was planned to be stationed on 24-hour watch, with a reaction time of 30 minutes during daytime and 60 minutes during night. Tests showed that aircraft could be used for spills up to 5,000 tonnes (4,900 long tons; 5,500 short tons), depending on the type of oil. The dispersant should ideally be applied two hours after discharge.

The dispersant application system developed for the De Havilland of Canada DHC-6/300 Twin Otter aircraft consisted of two 1,550-liter (340 imp gal; 410 U.S. gal) aluminumfive- chamber tanks for dispersant. The uniqueness of the system on board the aircraft, as it was developed by the operator NFK and Widerøe's engineering department, was primarily that it was self-contained and propelled by bleed air tapped from one of the two Pratt & Whitney gas turbines on the aircraft, pressurizing the tanks. The arrangement of the tanks gave no change in Center of Gravity during discharge of the dispersant.
