= Arctic Air (Norway) =

Norwegian airline, 1996–2003

| IATA | ICAO | Call sign |
|---|---|---|
| 8A | AKR | Arctic Norway |
- Founded: 1996
- Ceased operations: 2003
- Operating bases: Kirkenes Airport, Høybuktmoen; Oslo Airport, Gardermoen
- Fleet size: 2 (2003)
- Destinations: 5 (2003)
- Headquarters: Alta, Norway

Arctic Air AS was a Norwegian airline which operated between 1996 and 2003. From 2000 to 2003 it built up a network of scheduled services, in part based on public service obligation (PSO) contracts, flying with two Dornier 228. The company was based in Alta.

Initially Arctic Air operated two Cessna 206 seaplanes, mostly in Kautokeino. After unexpectedly winning the 2000 to 2003 PSO tender to link Kirkenes Airport to Vardø Airport, the airline leased its first Dornier 228. A year later services were also introduced to Alta, Lakselv as was an international route to Murmansk. From 2002, the airline won a PSO contract to link from Fagernes to Oslo. After losing both contracts in the 2003 tender, the company was liquidated.

== History ==
Arctic Air was established by eleven businessmen in Kautokeino. It registered its two first aircraft, both Cessna 206s, in May 1996. The company began flying general aviation charter missions, with reindeer husbandry and the power company Statkraft as major customers. Operations were summer-only, and based out of various lakes in the municipality.

In 1999 the airline chose to bid for public service obligation contracts with the Ministry of Transport and Communications, bidding for the routes from Tromsø to Sørkjosen, from Tromsø to Hasvik and Hammerfest, as well as from Kirkenes to Vardø. The latter route was won in September, after Arctic Air had bid 37 million kroner for the route. The incumbent, Widerøe, had bid 102 million. The contract, effective 1 April 2000 through 31 March 2003, was awarded in September. At the time the airline lacked suitable aircraft to operate the routes. Arctic Air was met with local opposition. While flown by Widerøe, Vardø Airport, Svartnes had been connected to a network westwards as well as to Kirkenes Airport, Høybuktmoen. With Arctic Air operating, only a feeder service would be provided. By December the population was generally satisfied with the thrice-daily service, and patronage had increased by fifteen percent since they had taken over.

The airline started with two new commercial services from 2 April 2001, to better utilize their aircraft. The first was an onward connection from Vardø to Alta Airport, the second was an thrice-weekly international service from Kirkenes to Murmansk Airport. The route connected with flights at Kirkenes onwards to Tromsø, Alta and Oslo. From July Finnair started a thrice-weekly service from Helsinki via Rovaniemi to Lakselv. Arctic Air joined forces through establishing a feeder service to Lakselv Airport, Banak from Vardø, corresponding with the Finnair flights.

The company had a revenue of 20 million kroner in 2001, of which 13 million was state subsidies. At the time it employed twelve people. By November 2001 the airline was discussing the possibility of bidding for and taking over large or the entirety of the Finnmark network. The airline claimed it would be able to provide cheaper and more frequent services than Widerøe through using smaller Dornier 228 aircraft. Two months later the airline stated that was considering the possibility of launching a low-cost route from Alta to Oslo using a Boeing 737. The following year Arctic Air speculated about opening an air route from Tromsø to the mothballed Kautokeino Airport.

Instead the airline in February 2002 won a PSO contract to fly from Oslo Airport, Gardermoen to Fagernes Airport, Leirin. The contract awarded a subsidy of 8.3 million kroner, with two daily round trips. This caused the airline to procure a second Dornier 228 and station it at Gardermoen. The one-year contract had been called following the bankruptcy in GuardAir.

Widerøe won back the Vardø contract in August 2002, thus curtailing Arctic Air from operating the route. Also the Fagernes route was lost. However, Arctic Air was experiencing record-high patronage on the Fagernes route, up eighteen percent from the previous year. Russian authorities decided in October 2002 that Arctic Air would have to fly at a higher altitude than their aircraft without pressure cabins could withstand. Subsequently, Arctic Air was forced to terminate its route from 25 October. Arctic Air subsequently operated its last scheduled flight on 30 March 2003. The airline filed for bankruptcy in November 2003.

== Destinations ==
The following destinations were served by Arctic Air as scheduled services.

ARctic Air destinations
| Location | Airport | Start | End | Ref(s) |
|---|---|---|---|---|
| Alta | Alta Airport | 2001 | 2003 | |
| Fagernes | Fagernes Airport, Leirin | 2002 | 2003 | |
| Kirkenes | Kirkenes Airport, Høybuktmoen | 2000 | 2003 | |
| Lakselv | Lakselv Airport, Banak | 2001 | 2001 | |
| Murmansk | Murmansk Airport | 2001 | 2002 | |
| Oslo | Oslo Airport, Gardermoen | 2002 | 2003 | |
| Vardø | Vardø Airport, Svartnes | 2000 | 2003 | |

== Fleet ==
The following is a list of aircraft operated by Arctic Air. It states the model, total number of aircraft operated, and the year the first entered service and the last left service with the airline.

Arctic Air aircraft
| Model | Qty | First in | Last out | Ref(s) |
|---|---|---|---|---|
| Cessna 206 | 2 | 1996 | 2000 | |
| Dornier 228 | 2 | 2000 | 2003 | |
