= Bergen Air Transport =

Norwegian airline

IATA	ICAO	Call sign
—	BGT	BERGEN AIR
- Founded: 1998
- Ceased operations: 2017
- Hubs: Bergen Airport, Flesland
- Fleet size: 0
- Destinations: 0
- Headquarters: Bergen, Norway
- Key people: Geir Hellsten (CEO)
- Website: www.bergenair.no

Bergen Air Transport AS was an airline based at Bergen Airport, Flesland in Norway. In addition to charter aviation and an aviation workshop, it offered until 2017 a scheduled service between Bergen and Notodden Airport, Tuven. The airline operated two Beechcraft B200 King Air aircraft and one Cessna Citation CJ2. The airline was established in 1998, offering seaplane charter flights using Cessna 421 aircraft. The service to Notodden started in 2000; a Cessna 441 was acquired in 2003, and from 2006 the company used two Beechcraft. The company is owned by Geir Hellsten and Håkon Lie-Nielsen.

This airline is not to be confused with Bergen Air Transport (1961), which operated from approximately 1961 to 1977 with Douglas DC-3, DC-4 und DHC-2 Beaver aircraft.

== History ==
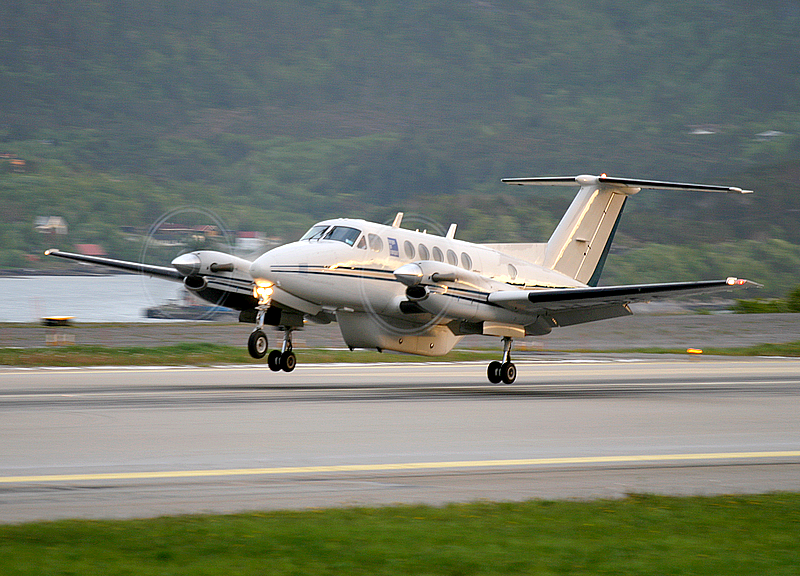
Bergen Air Transport Beechcraft 200 at Kristiansund Airport, Kvernberget

Bergen Air Transport was founded in 1998 by Geir Hellsten and Håkon Lie-Nielsen, and commenced operations the following year. Initial operations consisted of charter services, using a Cessna 421B. In 2000, the company replaced this aircraft with a Cessna 421C, and started the scheduled route between Bergen and Notodden using the six-seat aircraft. In 2000, the company had eleven employees and 2.6 million kr in revenue. To begin with, it made four round trips per week, but in 2001 it chose to increase to five, after experiencing high cabin loads. It transported 1,000 passengers in 2000, and 1,500 the following year. During the summer of 2002, the company also attempted to fly from Notodden to Kristiansund Airport, Kvernberget, but was forced to give up due to lack of passengers.

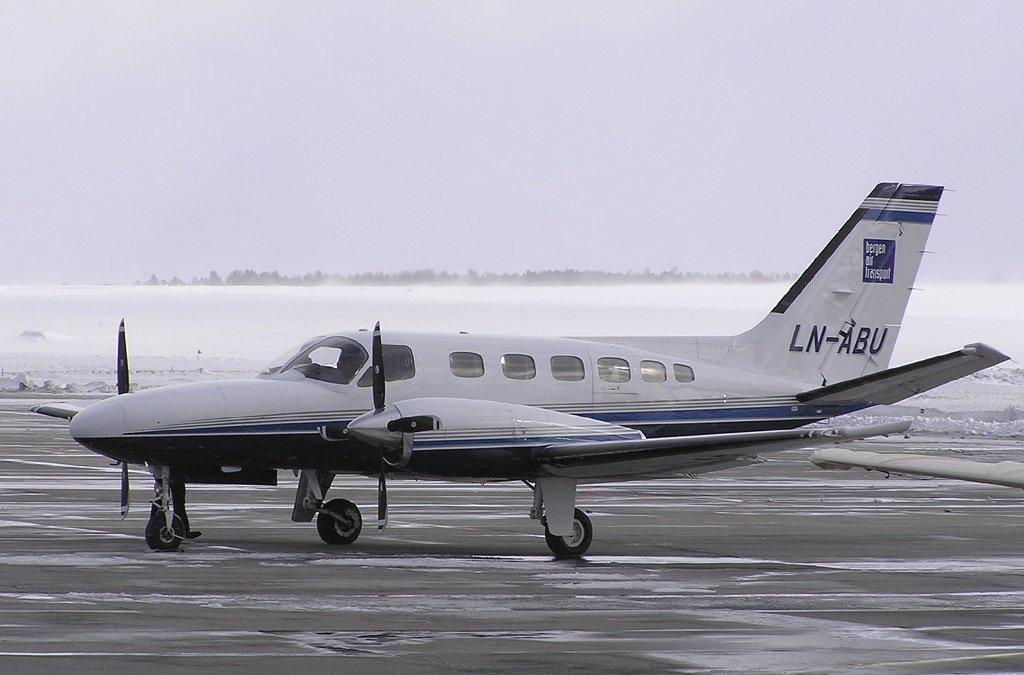
Cessna 441 Conquest II at Gdańsk Lech Wałęsa Airport in 2005

A hangar was built at Bergen Airport in 2003, and at the same time the airline was certified as a mechanical aviation workshop. The following year, the Cessna 421 was replaced with a Cessna 441 Conquest II. In 2006, two Beechcraft King Air were bought, and the last Cessna sold. On 20 November 2003, Notodden Airport was closed for all scheduled traffic by the Norwegian Civil Aviation Authority, due to a lack of safety requirements. Bergen Air Transport was forced to reroute all its aircraft to Skien Airport, Geiteryggen. Following an investment of NOK 500,000 from the airline and NOK 1.2 million from the municipality, which owns the airport, scheduled services commenced again. From 1 October 2004, NOK 250,000 was invested at Notodden Airport. Starting in October 2004, the airline also introduced security control of all passengers at Notodden Airport. In 2005, the company had a revenue of NOK 10.3 million; this increased to NOK 20.1 million in 2006, giving a profit of NOK 2.8 million, when the airline transported 2,841 passengers.

In September 2007, the company bought a new hangar at Notodden, giving it ample space for expansion, and new arrival and departure facilities., At the same time, the airline bought its first jet, a Cessna Citation CJ2. That year saw the airline transport 3441 passengers on 552 flights on the Bergen–Notodden route. The airline ceased operation of the route in 2017 and ceased all operative services the same year.
