= Gidsken Jakobsen =

Norwegian aviator

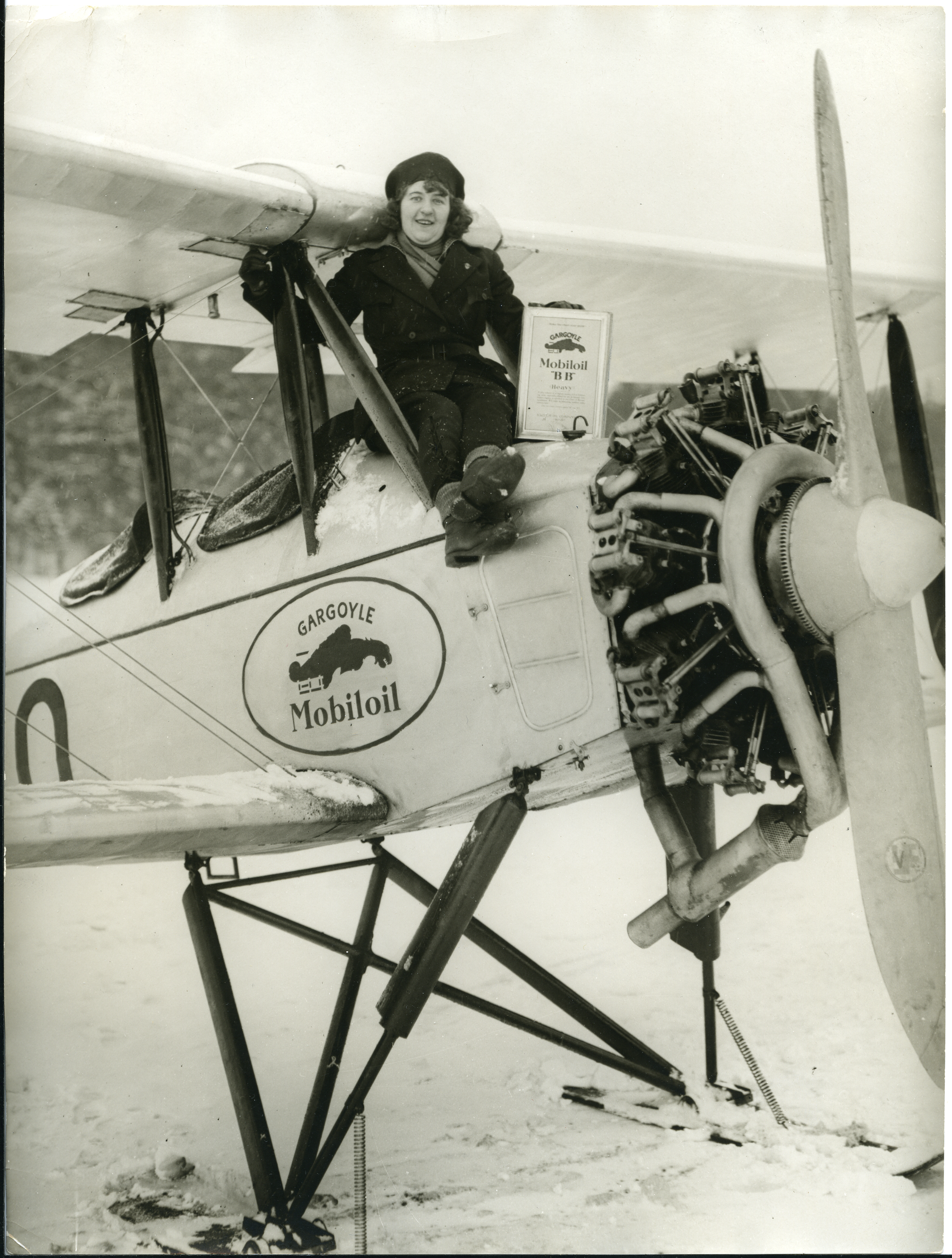

Gidsken Nilsine Jakobsen (1 August 1908 – 13 June 1990) was a Norwegian aviation pioneer.

At the age of 20, Jakobsen became only the second Norwegian woman to be awarded a pilot's license (after Dagny Berger in 1927), having achieved the highest position of the ten students attending the course.

She was one of the first Norwegians to establish commercial aviation in Norway, setting up her own airline in 1932 named Nord-Norges Aero operating Junkers F 13, and making her the first female head of a Scandinavian airline. Soon after in 1934 established a second airline called Bergens Aero and operating Loening C-2 Air Yacht.

In 1939 she registered her first aircraft in Oslo, and became the first person to fly from northern Norway to the capital during the winter months.

Norwegian Air Shuttle has dedicated one of their Boeing 737 aircraft, LN-NIP to Jakobsen, and her portrait is on the plane's vertical stabilizer.

== See also ==
- Aviation in Norway
