= Norsk Air =

Norwegian airline, 1961–1996

IATA	ICAO	Call sign
—	—	Norseman
- Founded: 1961
- Ceased operations: 1996
- Operating bases: Sandefjord Airport, Torp (1961–1996); Skien Airport, Geiteryggen (1987–1991)
- Fleet size: 4 (1996)
- Destinations: 5 (1996)
- Parent company: Kosmos (1985–1990); Widerøe (1990–1996)
- Headquarters: Sandefjord, Norway

Norsk Air was a Norwegian airline based at Sandefjord Airport, Torp. At its height from the mid-1980s and onwards it operated scheduled flights to Stavanger Airport, Bergen Airport, Trondheim Airport, and Copenhagen Airport, and for shorter periods also other Norwegian and international destinations. The airline had 156 employees and 150,000 annual passengers in 1989. The company was established as a sole proprietorship by Øyvind Skaunfelt as Vestfoldfly in 1961, after purchasing Thor Solberg's aviation school at Tønsberg Airport, Jarlsberg. In addition to an aviation college, the company operated various charter services using mostly Cessna aircraft. The company split into a flying school and an airline in 1972, with the latter taking the name Norsk Flytjeneste. Three 50-passenger Douglas DC-6 were subsequently bought and were, among other places, flown with aid charters to Bangladesh. Both the DC-6 and later charter flights with business jets proved unprofitable and were quickly terminated.

The company turned to regular charter services to Bergen and Stavanger in the 1980s, and from 1984 served the routes with scheduled flights, using seven-passenger Beechcraft 200 King Air. In 1985 the company was converted to a limited company and bought by Kosmos. It subsequently acquired four 30-passenger Embraer EMB 120 Brasilias—as the second European airline. It introduced several new routes, including international flights to Denmark and the United Kingdom, and took the name Norsk Air. The company bought Norving's Skien Airport, Geiteryggen division in 1987 and started operations from a second base. Kosmos failed in 1988 and Norsk Air was eventually given for free to Widerøe in 1990. Skien operations were discontinued the following year and the airline changed name to Widerøe Norsk Air. It remained a subsidiary until being amalgamated in 1996.

== History ==
=== Vestfoldfly ===
The airline was established as Vestfoldfly by Øyvind Skaunfelt in 1961. He had been working at Thor Solberg's aviation school at Tønsberg Airport, Jarlsberg, and offered to purchase the school and airplanes when Solberg retired. Two years earlier, Sandefjord Airport, Torp had opened a civilian sector and Skaunfelt decided to establish his company there. In May 1961, he received government permission for commercial flying. He started a newspaper route to Oslo Airport, Fornebu, and could also carry three passengers in his single-engine Cessna. The route continued onwards from Sandefjord to Tønsberg, Larvik and Skien Airport, Geiteryggen. Vestfoldfly also started offering scenic trips and charter. During the summer, the airline also flew seaplanes south along the coast to Kragerø, Risør and Arendal. Other activities involved crop dusting of forest for Felleskjøpet. The airline also provided a target service for the military. Four aircraft were permanently used to tow a target about 1,000 to 2,000 meters (3,300 to 6,600 ft) behind the aircraft, and military personnel would practice shooting at the target.

During the 1960s, Vestfoldfly never received a concession for a regular, scheduled flight from Sandefjord to Oslo. The reason was that the Skien-based Fjellfly held the concession for the routes from Oslo to Sandefjord, Tønsberg and Skien. Fjellfly never used its landing rights at Sandefjord, but nevertheless still hindered Vestfoldfly from starting a competing route. Skaunfelt eventually split his activity in two, demerging the aviation school and renaming it Den Norske Luftfartsskole, which remained in operation until 1999. The other activity was renamed Norsk Flytjeneste. In 1969, Norsk Flytjeneste and Jotun, a large Sandefjord-based industrial company, established Penguin Air Service, where Norsk Flytjeneste owned 25 percent of the shares. Penguin Air Service company bought a six-seat Piper PA-31 Navajo and started charter services for Jotun. In 1975, Bugge Supplyship also joined the joint venture and a second aircraft was bought. Most of the traffic was for the oil industry to Stavanger.

=== Norsk Flytjeneste ===
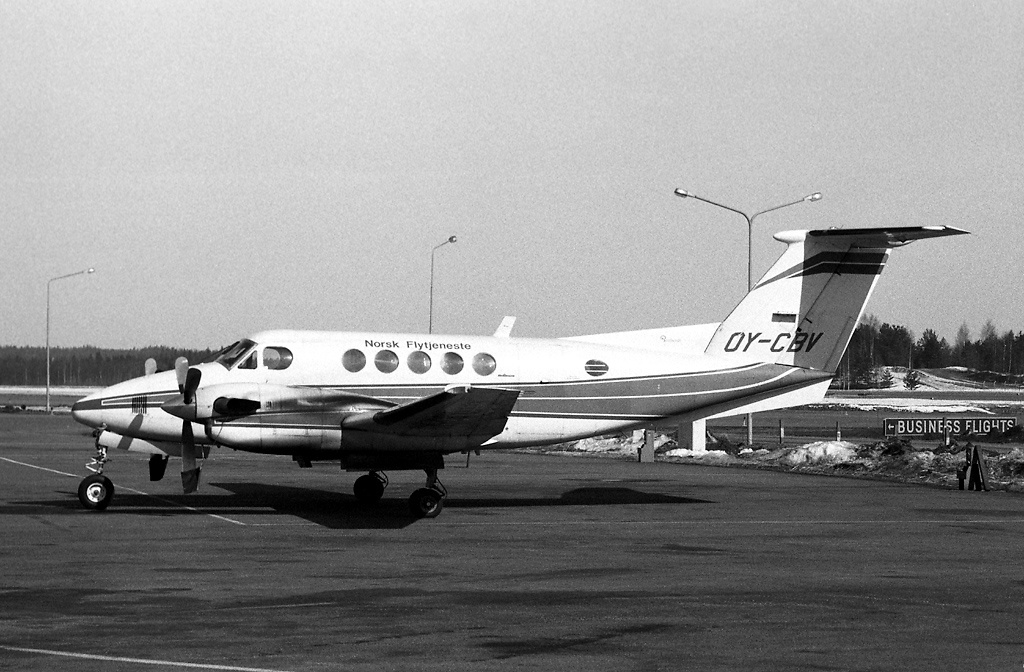
Beechcraft Super King Air in 1985

In 1972, Norsk Flytjeneste purchased two 50-passenger Douglas DC-6Bs from Braathens SAFE and leased one from Sterling Airways. They were used for domestic and international charter. The largest contract was from the Norwegian Church Aid, who contracted Norsk Flytjeneste to fly aid to Bangladesh. However, the airline failed to make money on the DC-6s, mostly because of the high operating costs, and sold them after a year. The company followed up with purchasing a ten-seat Cessna Citation business jet that they offered in the charter market. However, the market was not large enough, and the jet was sold.

The main market for the charter services was Stavanger Airport, Sola, mainly serving transport of personnel in the oil industry. By the 1980s, Norsk Air had up to four daily round trips between the two cities. In 1983, the airline received concession to start a regular scheduled service to Stavanger. A ten-seat Beechcraft Super King Air was bought and services started on 12 January 1984. Services to Bergen Airport, Flesland started on 10 July. Soon there were four daily round trips to both cities, supplemented by charter trips operated by Penguin. Starting on 26 March 1984, Norsk Flytjeneste experienced competition on the routes from Sandefjord to Bergen and Stavanger, when Busy Bee, on contract with Braathens SAFE, started flights using 50-passenger Fokker F27s. However, they operated only one round trip, with the same aircraft serving Sandefjord–Stavanger–Haugesund–Bergen.

In 1984, Norsk Flytjenesete started negotiations with the Sandefjord-based conglomerate Kosmos, who were seeking to invest in a local airline. Kosmos had decided to start a diversification strategy to spread their risk. Norsk Flytjeneste was at the time not making money on its routes, but Kosmos was willing to carry the loss as an investment. The airline was sold to Kosmos on 15 April 1985. At the time of the take-over, Norsk Flytjeneste had four Cessna 310s and one Piper Navajo. The airline's seven-passenger Beechcraft 200 and C90 King Airs were already owned by Kosmos. The company was changed from a sole propriatoriship to a limited company. Kjell Riege from Kosmos was appointed managing director while Tor Lundstrøm continued as chief pilot.

=== Norsk Air ===
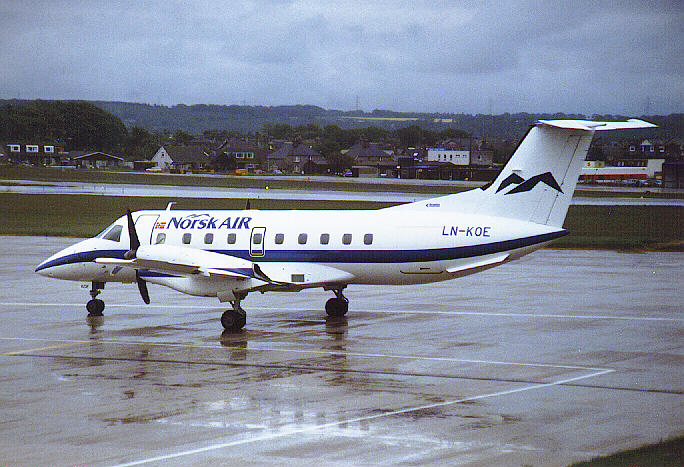
Embraer EMB 120 Brasilia at Aberdeen Airport in 1989

On 30 July 1985, Norsk Flytjeneste opened their first international route, to Copenhagen Airport in Denmark. The concessions had a limitation on not using aircraft with more than ten seats. However the limitation was lifted later in the year. Under Kosmos' management, Norsk Flytjeneste started an aggressive expansion. Applications were made for concessions from Sandefjord to Gothenburg in Sweden, and from Oslo via Hamar and Røros to Trondheim. Norsk Flytjeneste also needed larger aircraft, and the airline evaluated several types, including the Embraer EMB 120 Brasilia, the 30-passenger Saab 340 and the Fokker F27. The company chose to order four 30-passenger Brasilias. During the negotiations with Embraer, the company realized that Norsk Flytjeneste was a difficult name for foreigners, since the Brazilians could not pronounce "Flytjeneste". When the new aircraft were delivered, the airline rebranded as Norsk Air.

The company also joined the joint venture Commuter Service along with other Norwegian regional airlines, Coast Aero Center, Mørefly and Trønderfly. The intention was to create a cooperative company which could compete in a more diversified market. The group's lawyer stated that the organizational structure among regional airlines was 15 years out of date and that the group would take market shares in a growing market, especially by starting new niche direct services.

Norsk Air was the second airline in Europe to order the Brasilia, after Air Excel. Three were financed with loans from Banco de Brasil and the last was leased. With the introduction of the Brasilias in 1986, the airline started a route from Sandefjord to Trondheim Airport, Værnes. From 1985 to 1986, the airline's costs doubled, but not their income. In 1987, Terje Røsjode, former bank chief for Christiania Bank in Sandefjord, took over as managing director. The Brasilias had state-of-art technology, and although airlines purchase new aircraft to reduce their maintenance costs, this was not the reality for Norsk Air because they did not have sufficient competence to maintain the aircraft. In particular, they lacked sufficient electronic expertise, due to the increase of electronic components in the aircraft. All the other aircraft were sold.

In 1986, the company established a duty-free shop at Torp. By 1987, Norsk Air was losing NOK 20 million per year. The company established a route from Sandefjord to Göteborg Landvetter Airport and to London Stansted Airport, but neither were profitable, and were quickly terminated. Norsk Air started a route from Fagernes Airport, Leirin to Oslo and Bergen on 4 November 1987. The route turned out to be unprofitable, and was terminated on 1 June 1988, after the company had lost NOK 5 million on the route.

To develop the company, Kosmos and Norsk Air bought the Kirkenes-based airline Norving, which also operated flights from Skien Airport, Geiteryggen—about one hour's drive from Sandefjord—to Bergen, Trondheim and Stavanger. Norving had seven types of aircraft, but was losing large amounts of money, although the Norwegian Ministry of Transport and Communications covered their losses on some state-subsidized regional routes. The purchase of Norving caused an internal organization conflict between the two organizations. The operations from Skien were merged into Norsk Air, while the rest of Norving was sold. The latter went bankrupt in 1993. Norsk Air also showed interest in purchasing Widerøe, but none of the large owners were interested in selling.

=== Widerøe Norsk Air ===
Kosmos was bought by the Skaugen Group in 1988, and on 21 October, Kosmos' Chief Executive Officer (CEO) Bjørn Bettum and Chairman Otto Grieg Tidemand were fired. The Skaugen Group decided to integrate Kosmos' shipping and oil-related activities into their group. All other investments, including Norsk Air, were to be sold or closed. At the time, Norsk Air had 140 employees. Norsk Air's CEO, Mr. Røsjodet, made contact with Bård Mikkelsen, who was CEO of Widerøe, to try to convince them to purchase Norsk Air. Widerøe was at that time solely occupied with flying on the subsidized regional routes. The company was interested in having some non-subsidized routes to better benchmark its operations. The two largest owners, Scandinavian Airlines System (SAS) and Braathens SAFE, did not want to purchase Norsk Air, but the third-largest owner, Fred. Olsen & Co. liked the idea, and bought SAS' and Braathens SAFE's 62.3 percent stake in Widerøe to make the deal possible. Other possible purchasers who had negotiated with Norsk Air were Sterling Airlines, Partnair and Jan Einar Johansen, former owner of Scandi Line.

By 1989, the airline had 156 employees and 150,000 annual passengers. On 9 February 1989, Norsk Air's board decided to start the termination process if a sale was not made. The employees agreed to cut their wages 10 percent and not take sick days during the sales process. One of the main difficulties in the sales process was that Widerøe could not afford to purchase Norsk Air's hangar at the airport. Widerøe intended to continue operations at both Torp and Geiteryggen for a year to see where to establish its base. In fear that the airline would move to Skien, Sandefjord Municipality and Stokke Municipality, which owned the majority of the airport, agreed to purchase the hangar, which had been built for NOK 20 million in 1987, for NOK 11.5 million. Half the hangar would be rented to Widerøe for NOK 500,000 per year. This was insufficient to cover the NOK 1.2 million in annual interest costs.

Widerøe took over Norsk Air free of charge on 1 May 1989, and changed the company's name to Widerøe Norsk Air. The company was kept as a subsidiary to avoid cross-subsidization of the subsidized routes. Widerøe started negotiations with Busy Bee, and agreed to lease the Fokker 50 used by Busy Bee to Sandefjord, in exchange for Busy Bee terminating the route in 1990. Widerøe Norsk Air also decided that it was not profitable to fly from both Skien and Sandefjord, and terminated all Skien services. Starting on 28 October 1991, the airline also started a route from Sandefjord via Kristiansand Airport, Kjevik to London. This route was terminated one year later. In 1993, Widerøe sold its Fokker 50 to Norwegian Air Shuttle. On 1 May 1996, Widerøe Norsk Air was merged with Widerøe and ceased to exist. After the merger, Widerøe phased out the Brasilias and replaced them with de Havilland Canada Dash 8 aircraft.

== Destinations ==
The following is a list of destinations served by Norsk Air in regular scheduled services. It includes the city, country, airport and the period in which the airline served the airport. Hubs are denoted with a dagger (†).

City	Country	Airport	Begin	End	Ref
Bergen	Norway	Bergen Airport, Flesland	1983	1996	
Copenhagen	Denmark	Copenhagen Airport	1985	1996	
Gothenburg	Sweden	Göteborg Landvetter Airport	1987	1987	
Fagernes	Norway	Fagernes Airport, Leirin	1987	1988	
Kristiansand	Norway	Kristiansand Airport, Kjevik	1991	1992	
London	United Kingdom	London Stansted Airport	1987	1992	
Sandefjord	Norway	Sandefjord Airport, Torp†	1983	1996	
Skien	Norway	Skien Airport, Geiteryggen†	1987	1991	
Stavanger	Norway	Stavanger Airport, Sola	1983	1996	
Trondheim	Norway	Trondheim Airport, Værnes	1986	1996	
