= Thor Tjøntveit =

Norwegian-American aviator and criminal

Thor Kristen Tjøntveit (28 July 1936 – 3 March 2017) was a Norwegian-American aviator.

Tjøntveit grew up at Hesthagen in Grimstad, Norway. After taking his pilot's license, he moved to the United States in 1961; he became an American citizen in 1965. In 1967, he crashed in Yukon as was missing for ten days before being found. He was also the first person to fly over both the North Pole and the South Pole in the same trip.

In the US, Tjøntveit operated a retailer of general aviation aircraft. He established the charter airline Trans Polar in 1970, which went bankrupt the following year. At the time the 33-million Norwegian krone bankruptcy was the largest in the country's history. Tjøntveit was charged, but acquitted of charges of deceit in the airline. In 1972 Tjøntveit established Norwegian Overseas Airways, which never received operating permit in Norway and therefore moved its operations to Bangladesh.

Tjøntveit was sentenced for gross fraud against an insurance company in 1987. He was indicted in 2003 in the largest value added tax fraud in Norwegian history, but fled the country. Upon his return in 2005, he was sentenced and remained in prison until 2012. He died on 3 March 2017.
