= Busy Bee =

Norwegian charter airline

IATA	ICAO	Call sign
BS	BEE	BUSYBEE
- Founded: 1966; 60 years ago
- Ceased operations: 1992; 34 years ago
- Operating bases: Oslo Airport, Fornebu
- Fleet size: 14
- Parent company: Braganza
- Headquarters: Oslo Airport, Fornebu; Fornebu, Bærum, Norway

Busy Bee was an airline which operated in Norway between 1966 and 1992. Entirely based around wet lease, it conducted a mix of regional services for larger airlines and the military, as well as corporate, ad hoc and inclusive tour charters.

Established as Busy Bee Air Service A/S by Bjørn G. Braathen, the airline initially mostly operated corporate charters, using among other aircraft a Learjet 23 and later three Hawker Siddeley HS.125. After a near-bankruptcy in 1973, the company fell under the ownership of Braganza and was renamed Air Executive Norway A/S. It focused on operating Short Skyvans and later Fokker F27 Friendships. From 1975 it operated regional services for its sister company Braathens SAFE and increasingly flew charter for the Norwegian Armed Forces.

The airline took the name Busy Bee of Norway A/S in 1980, at which time it also took delivery of a Boeing 737-200C. Regional services were introduced with Scandinavian Airlines Systems (SAS), followed by Fokker 50s entering service from 1988. Reduced military charters and a loss of a vital contract in 1991 caused the foundation to fall out of the airline and it filed for bankruptcy in December 1992. Key people and assets reestablished the airline as Norwegian Air Shuttle.

== History ==
Busy Bee was founded by Bjørn G. Braathen, son of Braathens SAFE's founder and owner Ludvig G. Braathen. It rested on two niches—providing feeder services to Braathens SAFE's services and providing corporate charter flights. Ludvig G. Braathens Rederi alone was in such high demand for corporate charter that the airline could nearly fill one plane with that group alone.

The company was incorporated as Busy Bee Air Service A/S in 1966, with operations commencing on 9 May. The name was inspired by a pub in London with the same name. Initially it operated a fleet of a Piper Aztec and a Learjet 23, the latter the first corporate jet operating out of Norway. In December, the Learjet was painted in zebra stripes and leased to a film company for the shooting of The Last Safari in Kenya.

The Learjet was sold in September 1967. Later that year, the airline took delivery of the first of what would be three Piper PA-31 Navajos. A Cessna 185 was also bought, which remained in use until 1974. The airline followed up with a second Piper Aztec in 1968, but had sold them both by 1969. A Cessna 206 was used between 1972 and 1974. Both the Cessnas were seaplanes, which operated out of the water airport at Fornebu.

Busy Bee launched its first Hawker Siddeley HS.125 in April 1968, and added a second such aircraft in December 1968 and a third in February 1970. By 1968, Busy Bee was the largest private charter operator out of Norway. In addition to business executives, the airline derived a major portion of its business from Norway's significant shipping industry. A typical task would involve flying spare parts and technicians to a far-away port to make crucial repairs to ships, allowing faster reentry into revenue service.

The airline took into use an air-supported hangar at Oslo Airport, Fornebu, in February 1969, which measured 67 by 34 meters (220 by 112 ft). This was caused by zoning restrictions at Fornebu, which banned the construction of permanent structures. The three HS.125s were sold in 1972.

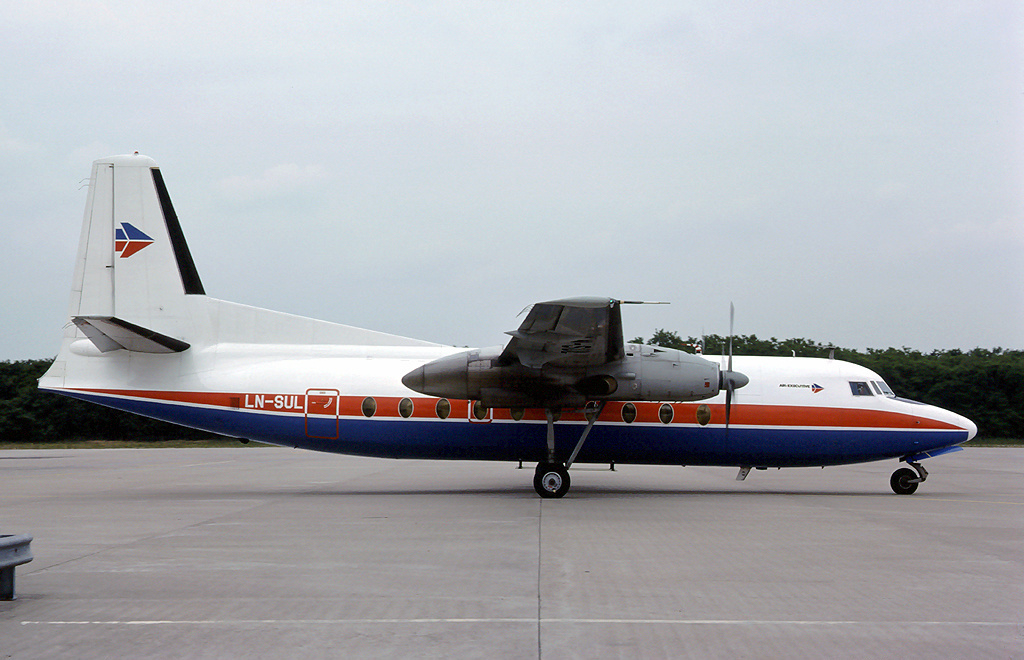
Fokker F-27 in Air Executive livery in 1978

The company came under financial distress in 1973. It went into administration, was restructured and bought by Braathens SAFE's holding company, Braganza. The company took the name Air Executive Norway A/S. The aircraft were gradually repainted in white, red and blue to more closely match that of Braathens SAFE. Meanwhile, they ordered three Short Skyvans, which were operated until 1984.

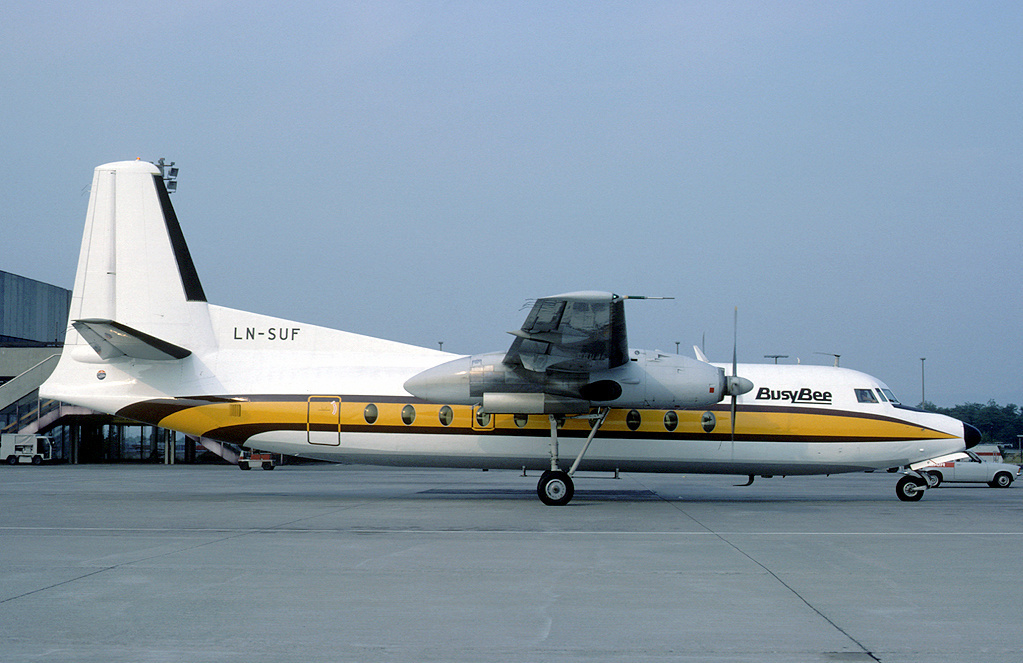
One of the three Fokker F27-100 Friendships which was taken over from Braathens SAFE, here depicted at Basel Airport in 1982

Braathens SAFE decided around 1975 that it would retire its Fokker F27s and focus entirely on operating services using jetliners. However, a few of their routes were not sufficiently heavily trafficked to warrant jetliners. An arrangement was reached whereby the three newest F-27s were transferred to Busy Bee, one each in 1975, 1976 and 1977. It also operated flights along the West Coast, connecting airports from Kristiansand Airport, Kjevik in the south to Trondheim Airport, Værnes in the north. From 1977 Busy Bee took over Braathens SAFE's two daily services from Stavanger Airport, Sola via Farsund Airport, Lista to Oslo.

Throughout the 1970s chartered contracts with the Norwegian Armed Forces became an increasing source of revenue for Busy Bee. To accommodate the increasing operations, Air Executive bought a Boeing 737-200 in 1979, named Storebia ("The Big Bee"). The following year the airline resumed it old brand, taking the name Busy Bee of Norway A/S. The aircraft received a new yellow and brown livery with a bee on the vertical stabilizer. The airline received its fourth F27-100 in 1981 and two more in 1983.

Busy Bee won a contract to operate several inter-Scandinavian routes for Scandinavian Airlines System from 1982. This were mostly out of Copenhagen Airport to Stavanger, Kristiansand, Göteborg Landvetter Airport and Jönköping Airport, as well as between Oslo and Gothenburg. For instance, the Oslo–Gothenburg route replaced a Douglas DC-9 service which was running at a loss. With smaller capacity and higher frequency, Busy Bee was able to triple patronage within three years and brought profitability to the route. Due to disputes with the labor unions, SAS terminated parts of its contract with Busy Bee in March 1984. Instead they established what would become SAS Commuter. However, delays postponed the route transfer until December.

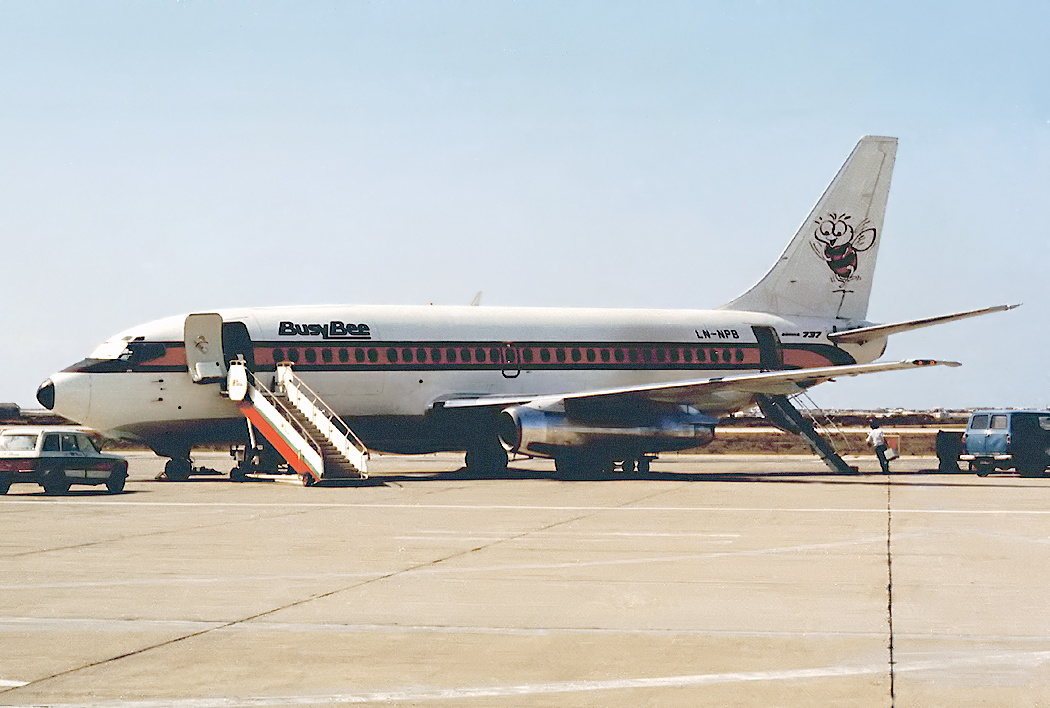
The airline's Boeing 737-200C at Faro Airport in 1984.

Busy Bee started services out of Haugesund Airport, Karmøy, to Bergen, Stavanger and Sandefjord Airport, Torp, on 26 March 1984, as a subcarrier for Braathens SAFE. Braathens SAFE never made a profit on the service. Busy Bee made two major purchase contracts with Fokker in 1985. In May it ordered four new F27s with delivery the following year. In June it ordered four Fokker 50s with delivery in late 1988. The new F27s were of the modernized -200 variant. For four months of 1986 Busy Bee leased a fifth F27-200.

The airline had a revenue of 209 million kroner in 1986, up 31 percent, and produced a profit of 5 million kroner. Busy Bee partnered with Gambia Air Shuttle in 1987 to help start the airline's operations. For a year, Busy Bee wet leased an F-27 to the fledgling airline to allow it to commence its route from Banjul International Airport to Dakar Yoff International Airport.

By 1986, Busy Bee was earning 35 percent of its revenue from subcarrying with Braathens SAFE, 25 percent from SAS, 20 percent from military contracts, 10 percent from inclusive tour charter and ten percent from ad hoc charter. Busy Bee was the regular partner of Gulliver, who contracted the Boeing to fly three weekend trips during the summer to Greece. The company estimated that half its profits derived from the military contract. Busy Bee operated about 20,000 flights and transported 800,000 passengers in 1986.

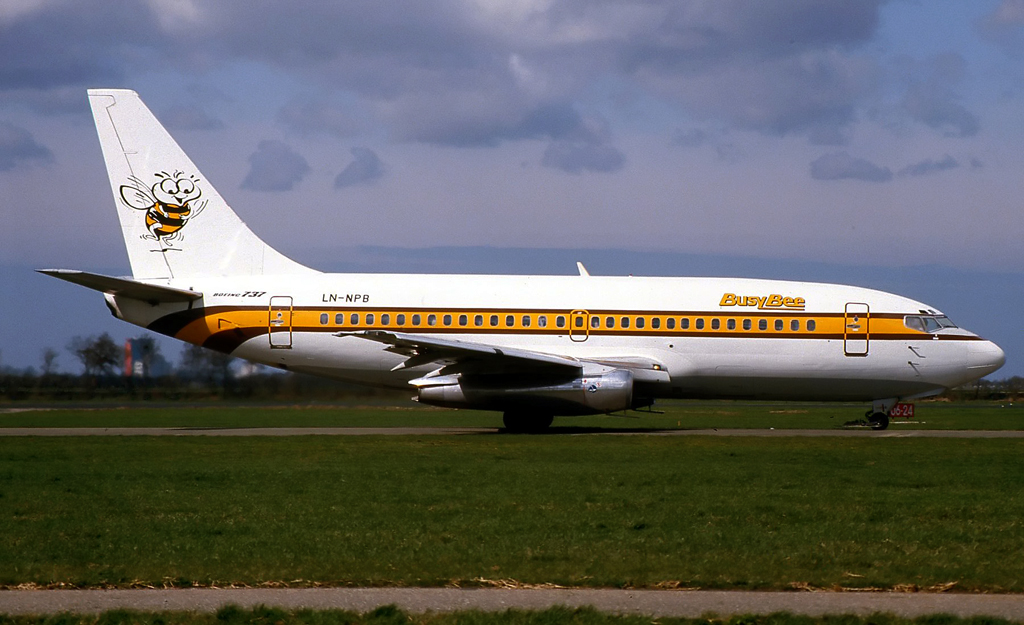
The airline's Boeing 737-200C at Rotterdam The Hague Airport in 1987. This plane would later be sold to Sahara Airlines, and would later be involved in the 1994 Indira Gandhi Airport collision

During the late 1980s, the Norwegian Armed Forces changed their travel procurement practices, shifting focus on chartering aircraft to instead buying tickets on scheduled flights. This hit Busy Bee particularly hard, as it had a large portion of its revenue tied up with the military contracts. To compensate, Busy Bee increased its focus on European wet lease contracts, which it signed with among others NLM CityHopper, Austrian Airlines and British Midland International.

The airline lost 12 million kroner in 1989. They were unable to sell three of the F27s which had been replaced with F50s the previous year. However, the company was able to downsize easily after 30 pilots resigned to work for SAS Commuter, which expanded its operations in Northern Norway in 1990. It proposed in October that the airline could take over operation of the military Lockheed C-130 Hercules transporters, allowing them to be wet leased on commercial duties when not in regular use, but the idea was squarely rejected by military.

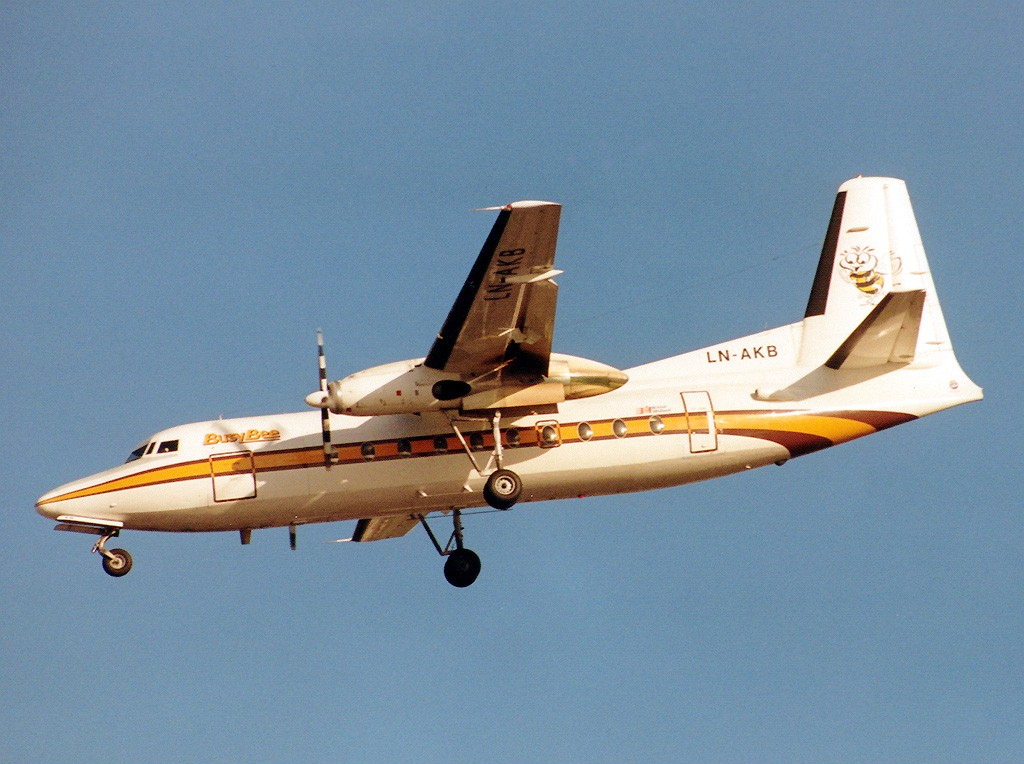
One of the more modern Fokker F27-200 Friendships landing at London Heathrow Airport in 1989

Services to Sandefjord were terminated in 1991. This followed an agreement that one Fokker 50 aircraft was to be sold to Widerøe Norsk Air. An important blow came in January 1991, when Busy Bee lost the tender to operate flights for the military, with Busy Bee bidding just half a million above Norway Airlines's 100 million kroner. Thus the need for the 737 evaporated from April. This caused the company to reduce its staff from 325 to 200, and reduce its fleet from seventeen to nine aircraft. In September the military announced that it would abolish its leasing operations and instead buy scheduled tickets, terminating the last military charters from 1 April 1992.

SAS and Busy Bee entered negotiations in November 1991 to look into the possibility of establishing a new airline, Norwegian Commuter. Several business models were considered, either with Norwegian Commuter pooling regional operations operated by the two existing companies, or an all-ot merger. Either way the idea was that the new company would have taken over all subcarried regional flights for Braathens SAFE and SAS in southern Norway. However, nothing came of the plans. The company received 30 million kroner in new share capital in December 1991 and a two-year contract to fly routes for Braathens. This was made conditional of both downsizing and wage reductions.

The airline secured a contract to fly for the administration of Air Nordic out of Stockholm Västerås Airport to Sundsvall, Vasa, Gothenburg, Örebro and Oslo. On 4 May 1992 Busy Bee started flying a route from Stavanger to Amsterdam Schiphol Airport for KLM.

Busy Bee filed for bankruptcy on 17 December 1992. The management started working during latter part of 1992 to create a contingency plan to continue operations past a bankruptcy. Regulations demanded that the chief pilot, chief technical officer and the accountable manager had to continue if the air operator's certificate (AOC) was to be continued. They made an agreement with Braathens to fly the West Coast regional routes, cutting the hourly cost from 17,000 to 12,000 Norwegian krone. Although operations had halted, the planning was initially carried out within the framework of the receivership. One million kroner was raised in capital. Norwegian Air Shuttle was incorporated on 22 January 1993. Operations commenced on 28 January 1993 and the new airline kept the Busy Bee livery until May 1993, when a red, blue and white livery similar to that of Braathens was introduced.

== Fleet ==
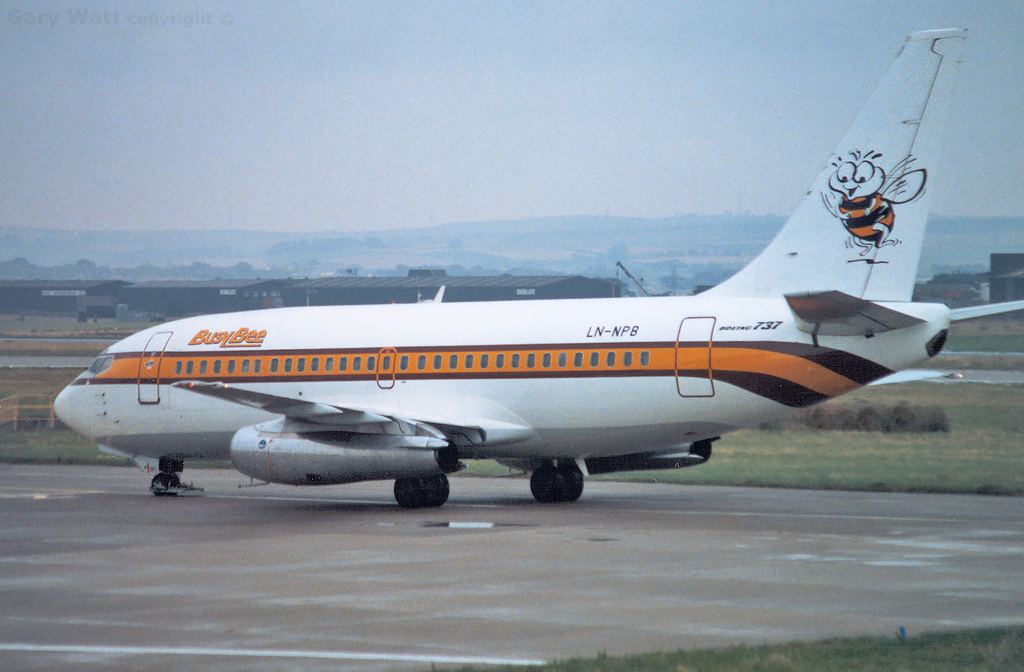
Busy Bee Boeing 737-200 at Aberdeen Airport

Busy Bee employed three liveries throughout its history. During the initial Busy Bee period from 1966 to 1973, it had honey-colored detailing. During the Air Executive period until 1980, the airline had a mixed white, blue and red livery, which brought it close to that used by its larger sister company. The Busy Bee brand was reintroduced in 1980, after which the airline used a honey and brown cheatline and decorated the vertical stabilizer with a bee.

From 1980 the airline operated a single Boeing 737-2R4C. The aircraft was bought through a partnership with the Norwegian Armed Forces, in which it was specially equipped to meet military needs. Specifically, it was a combi variant, which encompassed a side loading door and the possibility to quickly rearrange the interior between all-passenger, all-freight, combined passenger and freight, as well as VIP configuration. The aircraft was designed to be able to operate out from gravel runways and was also as the only 737 certified to be used for parachuting.

Busy Bee aircraft
Model	Qty	Built	First in	Last out	Ref(s)
Piper PA-23 Aztec	2	1966	1966	1969	
Learjet 23	1	1965	1966	1967	
Cessna 185	1	1966	1967	1974	
Hawker Siddeley HS.125	3	1967–68	1968	1972	
Piper PA-31 Navajo	3	1967–69	1967	1974	
Cessna 206	1	1966	1972	1974	
Short Skyvan	3	1975	1974	1984	
Fokker F27-100 Friendship	6	1964–67	1975	1992	
Boeing 737-2R4C	1	1979	1979	1991	
Fokker F27-200 Friendship	5	1986	1986	1992	
Fokker 50	5	1988–89	1988	1992	
Fokker F27-600QC Friendship	1	1968	1988	1989	

== Bibliography ==
- Hagby, Kay (1998). Fra Nielsen & Winther til Boeing 747 (in Norwegian). Drammen: Hagby. ISBN 8299475201.
- Melling, Kjersti (2009). Nordavind fra alle kanter (in Norwegian). Oslo: Pilotforlaget.
- Tjomsland, Audun; Wilsberg, Kjell (1995). Braathens SAFE 50 år: Mot alle odds (in Norwegian). Oslo. ISBN 82-990400-1-9.
- Tjomsland, Audun (2005). Høyt spill om Torp (in Norwegian). Sandefjord: Tjomsland Media. ISBN 82-997212-0-2.
- Trumpy, Jacob (2012). Høyt spill (in Norwegian). Oslo: Kagge Forlag. ISBN 978-82-489-1190-6.
