= Coast Aero Center =

Norwegian airline, 1975–1988

IATA	ICAO	Call sign
BX	CST	Coast center
- Founded: 1975
- Ceased operations: 1988
- Focus cities: Haugesund Airport, Karmøy
- Headquarters: Karmøy Municipality, Norway
- Key people: Asbjørn Utne (owner)

Coast Aero Center A/S was a regional airline based Haugesund Airport, Karmøy in Karmøy Municipality, Norway. It had only small-plane operations and mechanical services until 1984, when it acquired concessions to operate at the new Stord Airport, Sørstokken, Geilo Airport, Dagali, and eventually from Haugesund to Aberdeen. It soon turned out that the company was not profitable and it filed for bankruptcy in 1988. The estate continued on as Coast Air.

== History ==
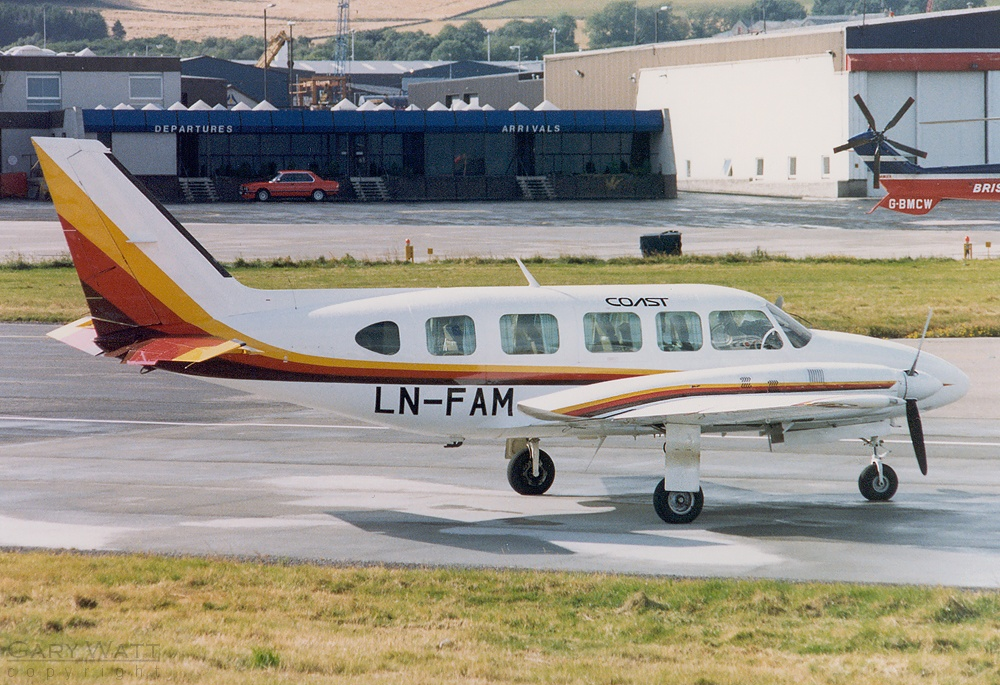
Coast Aero Center Piper PA-31 Navajo at Aberdeen Airport in 1986

Coast Air was founded in 1975, the same year as Haugesund Airport, Karmøy. It was one of two initially general aviation companies established with the opening of the airport, the other being Nordsjøfly. Coast Aero Center first operated a seaplane out of the harbor at the airport. Its early fleet consisted of a Cessna 207 and two Cessna 206.

From 1981 the airline operated a Piper PA-31 Navajo and the following year it bought a Piper PA-34 Seneca. The company remained a local mechanical and small-plane operator until 1984, when it started to apply for concessions to perform regional airline services in Norway. The company was owned and run by Asbjørn Utne.

Following the 1984 decision of Scandinavian Airlines System to discontinue their route from Haugesund to Aberdeen in the United Kingdom, Coast Aero Center applied for the concession the route, hoping to use a 15-seat Embraer Bandeirante that would be bought used for NOK 7.5 million. The service would have a morning flight from Haugesund, with return in the evening. While SAS had stated that they were not interested in the route, in November 1985 they altered course and executed their preferential right to start the route themselves. However, in April 1986, SAS announced that they would not operate the route anyway. Following this, Coast Aero Center commenced the service on 20 August. It proved unprofitable and was terminated in April 1987.

Coast Aero Center applied, along with Norving and Fonnafly, in October 1984 for the concession to fly out of Stord Airport, Sørstokken on routes to Oslo, Bergen and Stavanger. Coast Aero Center succeeded in the application, and service started on 12 August 1986 with a ten-passenger Beechcraft Super King 200. The company received a concession in August, allowing them to fly from Stord via Skien Airport, Geiteryggen to Oslo. By March 1987, traffic had increased so much that the company instead put into service a larger, 20-seater de Havilland Canada Twin Otter aircraft. Additional concessions to fly to Haugesund were also granted the same year, as were direct services to Oslo, making the stops in Skien unnecessary.

In 1985, the company joined Commuter Service, a joint venture along with the regional airlines Mørefly, based in Ålesund, Trønderfly, based in Trondheim, and Norsk Flytjeneste, based in Sandefjord. The goal was to coordinate the services, and grow through new, small routes.

Coast Aero Center was awarded the concession on 20 June 1986 for flying from Stavanger to Geilo Airport, Dagali until 1991. It was flown using a Beechcraft Super King 200. The ridership from Geilo turned out to be too bad, and both Coast Aero Center and Norving terminated their routes. Widerøe and Norsk Air said there was not enough ridership for them to be interested. The airline had a revenue of NOK 14 million and had 24 employees in 1986. That year, they chose to connect to the PNR/Smart booking system. The company bid for operating parts of the Norwegian Air Ambulance in 1987, but failed.

The company was thrown into financial distress on 7 February 1988, when Den norske Creditbank (DnC) announced that they would not issue more credit. At the time the company had nine daily routes, and 35 employees. All services were immediately suspended. It had a debt of NOK 23 million, of which DnC demanded NOK 13 million paid by 10 February, but the bank later gave the company three weeks to find the capital. On 17 February a proposal for refinancing was made, where the hangars were sold to the local municipalities, who would also make a guarantee for NOK 2 million. DnC would delete part of the debt, and additional capital would be granted from the Kosmos-owned Norsk Air. This was not sufficient, and on 29 April, Coast Aero Center filed for bankruptcy. Also Asbjørn Utne had to file for personal bankruptcy.

== Fleet ==
The following is a list of aircraft operated by Coast Aero Center. It contains the total number of aircraft operated by the airline (qty), the years the aircraft were built, the year the aircraft entered service with Coast Aero Center and the year the last aircraft was taken out of service.

Coast Aero Center aircraft
Model	Qty	Built	First in	Last out	Ref(s)
Cessna 207	1	1969	1978	1984	
Cessna 206	2	1973–78	1980	1988	
Piper PA-31 Navajo	1	1979	1981	1988	
Piper PA-34 Seneca	1	1980	1982	1984	
Embraer EMB-110 Bandeirante	1	1980	1985	1987	
Beechcraft King Air	2	1981	1986	1988	
de Havilland Canada Twin Otter	1	1971	1987	1988	

== Destinations ==
The following is a list of scheduled destinations served by Coast Aero Center:

Coast Aero Center destinations
Location	Airport	Period	Ref(s)
Aberdeen	Aberdeen Airport	1986–87	
Bergen	Bergen Airport, Flesland	1986–88	
Geilo	Geilo Airport, Dagali	1986	
Haugesund	Haugesund Airport, Karmøy	1986–87	
Oslo	Oslo Airport, Fornebu	1986–83	
Skien	Skien Airport, Geiteryggen	1986–83	
Stavanger	Stavanger Airport, Sola	1986–83	
Stord	Stord Airport, Sørstokken	1985–83	

== Accidents and incidents ==
A Cessna 206 crashed in Solund Municipality on 3 May 1982, killing all three people on board. The accident was caused by the aircraft hitting a power line. The investigation concluded that it was caused by pilot error, as the captain had failed to notice the power line despite sufficient visibility and it being marked on the map.

== Bibliography ==
- Hagby, Kay (1998). Fra Nielsen & Winther til Boeing 747 (in Norwegian). Drammen: Hagby. ISBN 8299475201.
- Reitan, Sverre Utne (2003). Luftfarten på Haugalandet fra 1914 til 2004 (in Norwegian). Karmøy: Eget Forlag.
