= Nordsjøfly =

Norwegian airline, 1977–1983

Nordsjøfly A/S
IATA	ICAO	Call sign
-	-	-
- Founded: 9 April 1975
- Commenced operations: 5 March 1977
- Ceased operations: 1983
- Operating bases: Haugesund Airport, Karmøy
- Parent company: Norving (1981–83)
- Headquarters: Avaldsnes, Karmøy Municipality, Norway

Nordsjøfly A/S was an airline which operated from 1977 to 1983 out of Haugesund Airport, Karmøy. Based in Avaldsnes in Karmøy Municipality, Norway, the airline used a mix of aircraft to operate scheduled and charter flights. It was started at the time of Haugesund Airport opening and commenced a taxi route service to Bergen and Stavanger, at first using the Piper PA-31 Chieftain and a Beechcraft 99 Queenliner.

A service from Stavanger via Farsund to Kristiansand was introduced in 1980. Larger Britten-Norman Islander and Fairchild Swearingen Metroliner were used for charter flights, the latter also used on scheduled services from 1981. Norving bought the airline that year. Nordsjøfly never made a profit and was liquidated in 1983. Norving continued to carry on the scheduled services itself until 1987.

== History ==
Nordsjøfly was incorporated on 9 April 1975, with one employee and operating one aircraft, a Cessna 402. It was based at Haugesund Airport, Karmøy, which opened the previous day. Nordsjøfly was one of two airlines established at the airport that year, the other being Coast Aero Center. For charter and general aviation operations the airline procured a Piper PA-31 Chieftain.

The airline received a concession on 12 February 1976 to operate a taxi route connecting Haugesund to Bergen Airport, Flesland and Stavanger Airport, Sola. This had the advantage of the airline being allowed to operate more flexibly and could cancel flights with few passengers. On the other hand, it could only operate aircraft with up to ten passengers. The routes commenced on 5 March 1977 with three daily flights to Bergen and two to Stavanger. The regular concession for the route was granted to Braathens SAFE, but they chose not to execute it, allowing for a smaller airline to operate an interim service. For these route as well as charter the airline bought a Beechcraft 99 Queenliner and a Britten-Norman Islander.

Operations of the route proved to be unprofitable. In 1977 the airline flew 12,000 passengers, but Nordsjøfly lost one million Norwegian krone in losses. Construction of a combined hangar and office building commenced in 1978. Nordsjøfly lost three million krone in 1979. The shipping company Normand increased its ownership in Nordsjøfly bought a quarter of the company that year.

A major charter contract was signed with oil company Ameco in 1980 to fly its employees from Bergen and Stavanger to Aberdeen Airport. Nordsjøfly therefore bought a 19-passenger Fairchild Swearingen Metroliner to carry out the job. Braathens SAFE withdrew from their services to Farsund Airport, Lista in 1980. Both Nordsjøfly and Norving applied to operate the route, and the Ministry of Transport and Communications awarded the concession to Nordsjøfly. The route from Haugesund via Stavanger to Farsund and Kristiansand Airport, Kjevik commenced on 3 November.

The airline had 11,801 passengers on the Bergen to Haugesund route in 1980, and 15,000 charter passengers. Revenue hit 12 million krone that year. By then the airline had bought a wide array of smaller aircraft, including a Beechcraft King Air, a Beechcraft 95 Travel Air and two Queenliners. This forced high maintenance and operations costs due to lack of commonality. The airline therefore initiated a program to streamline its operations with fewer aircraft classes.

Norving bought eighty percent of Nordsjøfly on 31 July 1981. The airline applied the ministry for a regular scheduled concession, which would allow it to use larger aircraft on the routes to Stavanger and Bergen. Rogaland County Municipality opposed the application, stating that it could have a negative impact on the ferry service from Stavanger via Haugesund to Bergen. The ministry granted Nordsjøfly the right to use Braathens' concession. The airline therefore started using its Metroliner on the Bergen and Stavanger routes.

It also made an interlining agreement with KLM which allowed passengers to fly from Haugesund via Stavanger to Amsterdam for the same prices as from Stavanger. A similar agreement was made with Scandinavian Airlines System (SAS) the following year, allowing Nordsjøfly to ferry passengers via Stavanger for flights onwards to Aberdeen, Amsterdam, Copenhagen, Glasgow and London.

Norving announced the liquidation of Nordsjøfly in 1982. Losses since the inception in 1975 and lack of commonalities within operations meant that Norving only wanted to keep the scheduled services and abolish the operating base at Haugesund. Braathens SAFE announced that they intended that their regional affiliate Busy Bee should take over the route, while Widerøe also announced an interest in operating the services. Busy Bee started the route in 1984 in competition with Norving. The latter retained its operations out of Haugesund until November 1987, when the base was closed.

== Fleet ==
The following is a list of aircraft operated by Nordsjøfly. It contains the total number of aircraft operated by the airline (qty), the years the aircraft were built, the year the aircraft entered service with Nordsjøfly and the year the last aircraft was taken out of service.

Nordsjøfly aircraft
Model	Qty	Built	First in	Last out	Ref(s)
Cessna 402	1	1975	1975	1976	
Piper PA-31 Chieftain	4	1973–80	1975	1984	
Britten-Norman Islander	1	1973	1976	1978	
Beechcraft 99 Queenliner	3	1968–70	1977	1984	
Beechcraft 95 Travel Air	1	1979	1979	1982	
Beechcraft King Air	1	1979	1979	1982	
Fairchild Swearingen Metroliner	1	1980	1981	1983	

== Destinations ==
The following is a list of scheduled destinations served by Nordsjøfly:

Nordsjøfly destinations
Location	Airport	Period	Ref(s)
Bergen	Bergen Airport, Flesland	1977–83	
Farsund	Farsund Airport, Lista	1980–83	
Haugesund	Haugesund Airport, Karmøy	1977–83	
Kristiansand	Kristiansand Airport, Kjevik	1980–83	
Stavanger	Stavanger Airport, Sola	1977–83	

== Bibliography ==
- Hagby, Kay (1998). Fra Nielsen & Winther til Boeing 747 (in Norwegian). Drammen: Hagby. ISBN 8299475201.
- Melling, Kjersti (2009). Nordavind fra alle kanter (in Norwegian). Oslo: Pilotforlaget.
- Reitan, Sverre Utne (2003). Luftfarten på Haugalandet fra 1914 til 2004 (in Norwegian). Karmøy: Eget Forlag.
