= Braganza (company) =

Swedish-registered holding company

Braganza AB
- Trade name: Braganza
- Type: Aktiebolag
- Founded: 1938
- Founder: Ludvig G. Braathen
- Headquarters: Bromma Airport, Stockholm, Sweden
- Owner: Per G. Braathen
- Subsidiaries: Braathens Regional Airlines; Braathens Regional Airways; Braathens International Airways; Kristiansand Zoo and Amusement Park
- Website: www.braganza.com

Braganza AB is a Swedish privately held holding company owned by Norwegian investor Per G. Braathen. The company has roots in Norway, where it was involved in shipping and aviation. Over the years, Braganza has focused primarily on the transport and tourism sectors. As of 2023, Braganza AB reported a revenue of 9.3 billion SEK and employed approximately 1,200 people.

== History ==
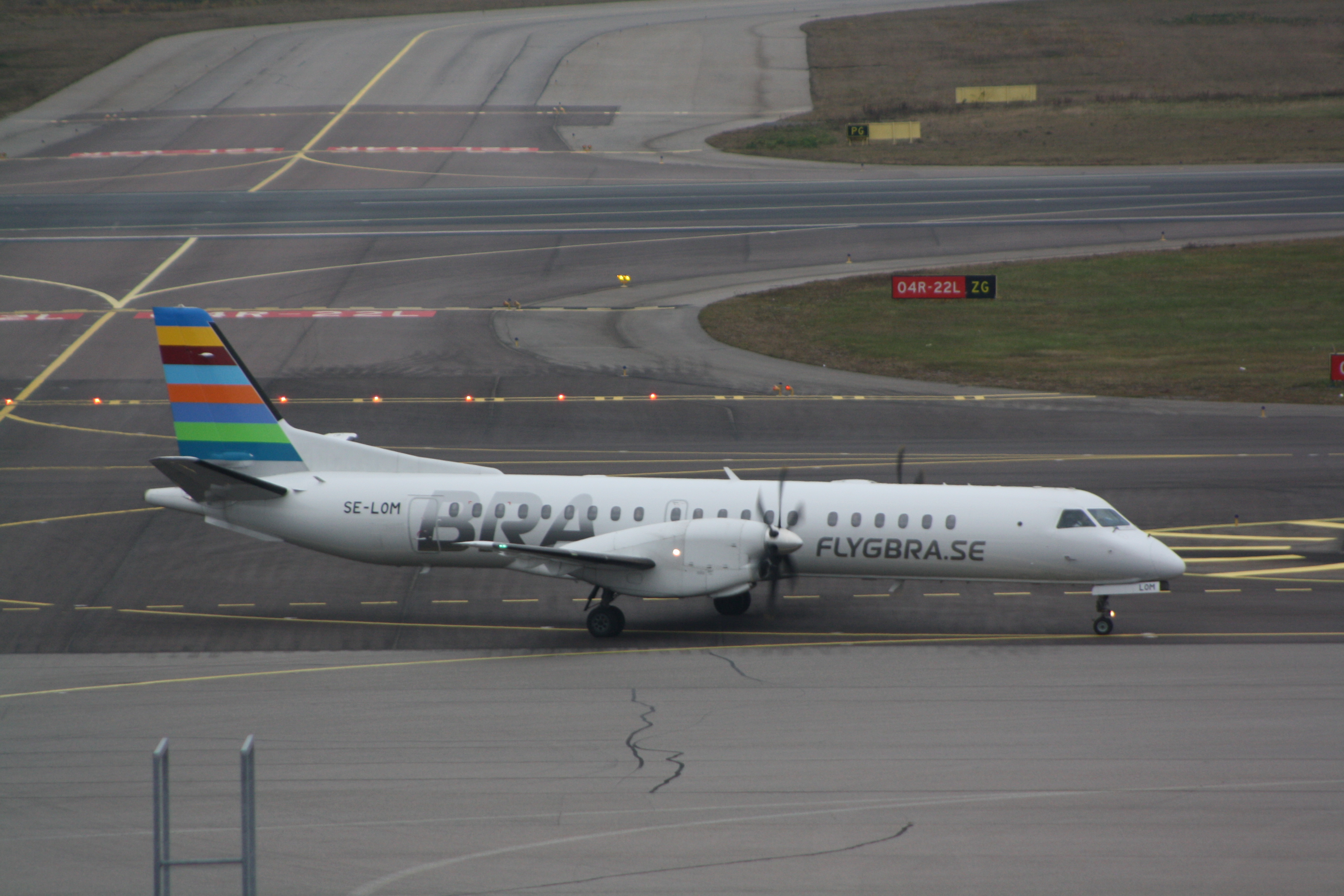
A Braathens Regional Airlines Plane

Braganza was founded in 1938 by Ludvig G. Braathen as part of the shipping movement under the name Ludv.G. Braathens Rederi. In 1946, Braathens founded the airline Braathens S.A.F.E., organizing its ownership through Braganza. The company held sole ownership of Braathens S.A.F.E. until 1994 and maintained partial ownership until 2001, when Norway's largest domestic airline was sold to the SAS Group for 1.1 billion Norwegian krone.

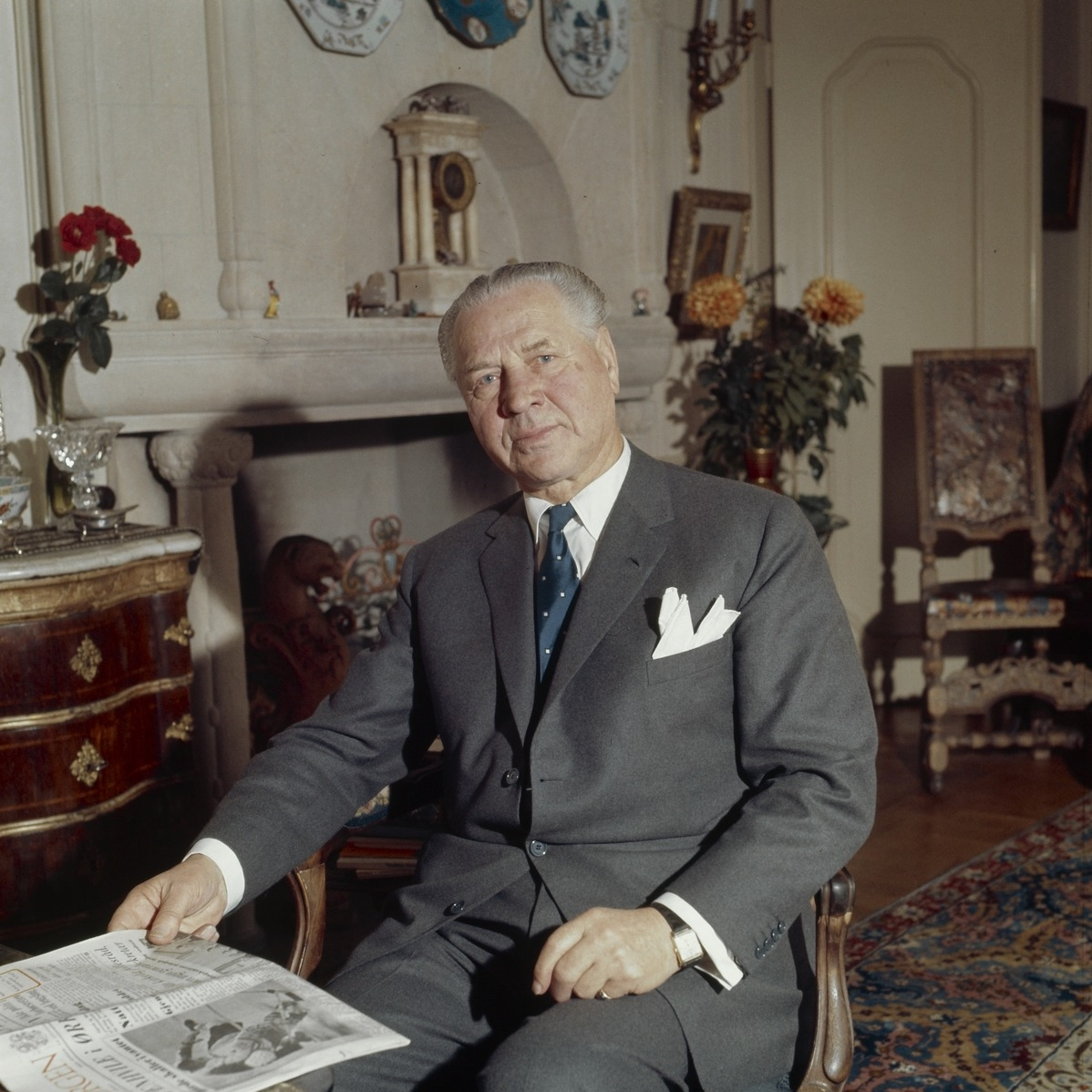
Founder Ludvig G Braathen

In addition to its airline interests, Braganza has previously owned Braathens Helikopter and Busy Bee. The company acquired several airlines, including Malmö Aviation and Transwede, and Braathens S.A.F.E. was publicly listed, resulting in a dispersion of ownership, with a significant stake controlled by the airline KLM. In 2001, Braathens was acquired by SAS.

In 2014, Per G. Braathen, the grandson of the founder, relocated the entire Braganza group from Norway to Sweden. Braathen stated that the decision was made in protest against Norway's corporate tax system and what Braathen described as populist politics. He claimed that Sweden provided a more predictable governance and a better environment for running companies.

== Current operations ==
Today, Braganza maintains significant investments in the transport and tourism industries. Major holdings include Kristiansand Zoo and Amusement Park and Braathens Regional Aviation
