= Hollywood Lie =

Single by Hanah
- Released: 2001
- Genre: Pop
- Length: 3:29
- Label: EMG Records
- Songwriters: Hanah, Håkan Sjöström, Robert Milojevic

"Hollywood Lie" is a 2001 pop song performed by Norwegian artist Hanah (Linn Christel Hanah Johnsen). The song peaked at #3 on the Norwegian chart, stayed on the chart for 12 weeks and sold 20 000 copies.

== Lyrics ==
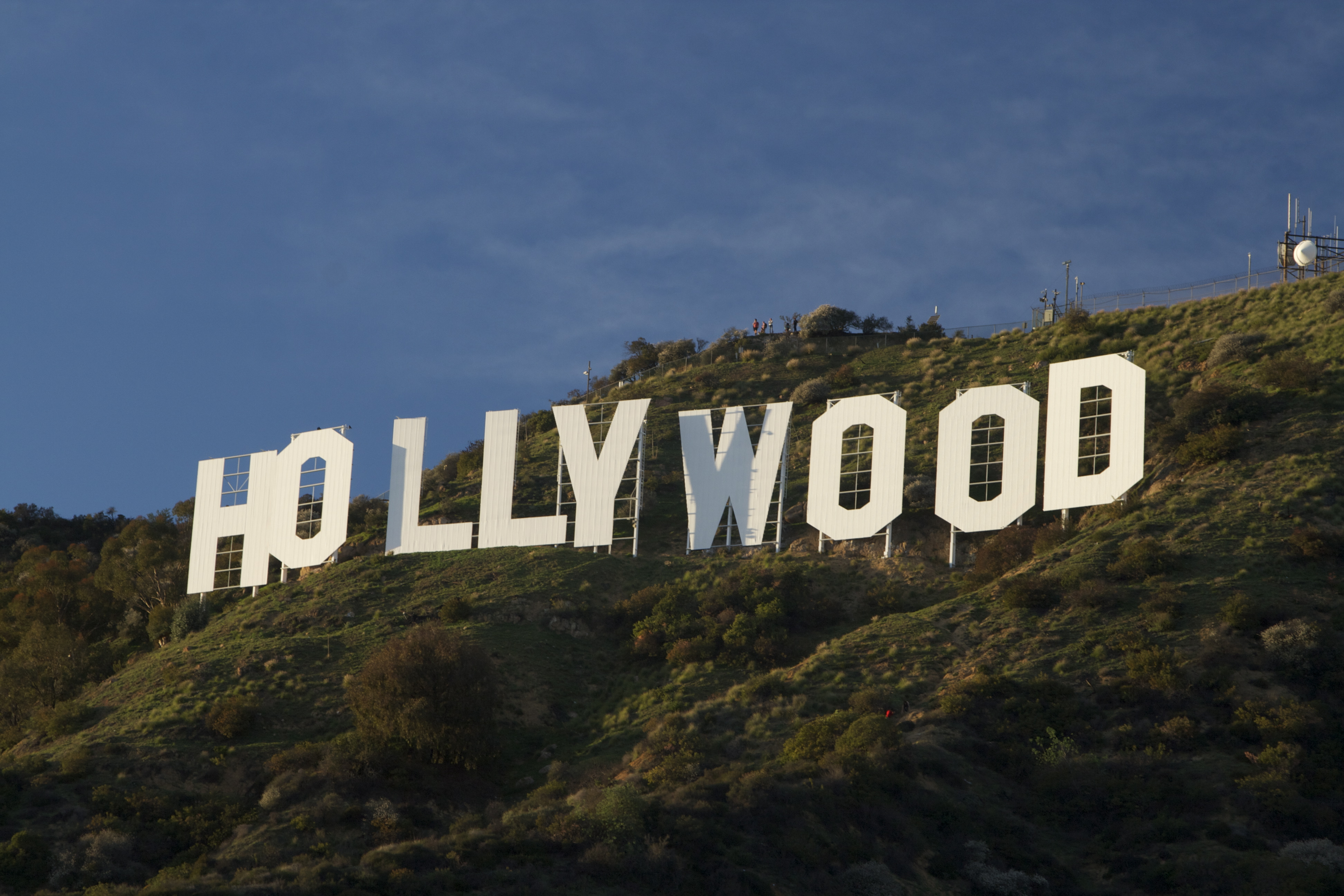
The lyrics make reference to the Hollywood Sign.

In the song, the singer imagines life in Hollywood (with a penthouse apartment and limousines) and considers hypothetical strategies of becoming famous and rich; Appearing in a TV-series or a film, changing her name, covering an old song (with a reference to "...Baby One More Time"), appearing on the cover of Vogue or hypergamy.

== Music video ==
The music video, filmed at Norsk Filmstudio stage B and Fornebu airport, was directed by Frank A. Gårdsø and Eirik Tyrihjel.

== Covers ==
The song was covered by Swedish artist Hannah Westin in the talent show Fame Factory on 23 November 2002. Westin had, without consent from the songwriters, substituted lyrics about getting high and doing pornography. She was credited as songwriter and was praised for her performance and the song, both of which resulted in criticism from Johnsen. Westin's version was later released in 2004 on the compilation album Absolute Fame Factory.

A performance by Ulrika Lundkvist, using the original lyrics, was released in 2003 on Fame Factory Volym 4.
