= 1994 Indira Gandhi Airport collision =

Aviation accident in India

Accident
- Date: 8 March 1994
- Summary: Loss of control after takeoff due to pilot error during training exercise
- Site: Near Delhi-Indira Gandhi International Airport, India; 28.555°N 77.084°E
- Total fatalities: 9
- Total injuries: 4

First aircraft
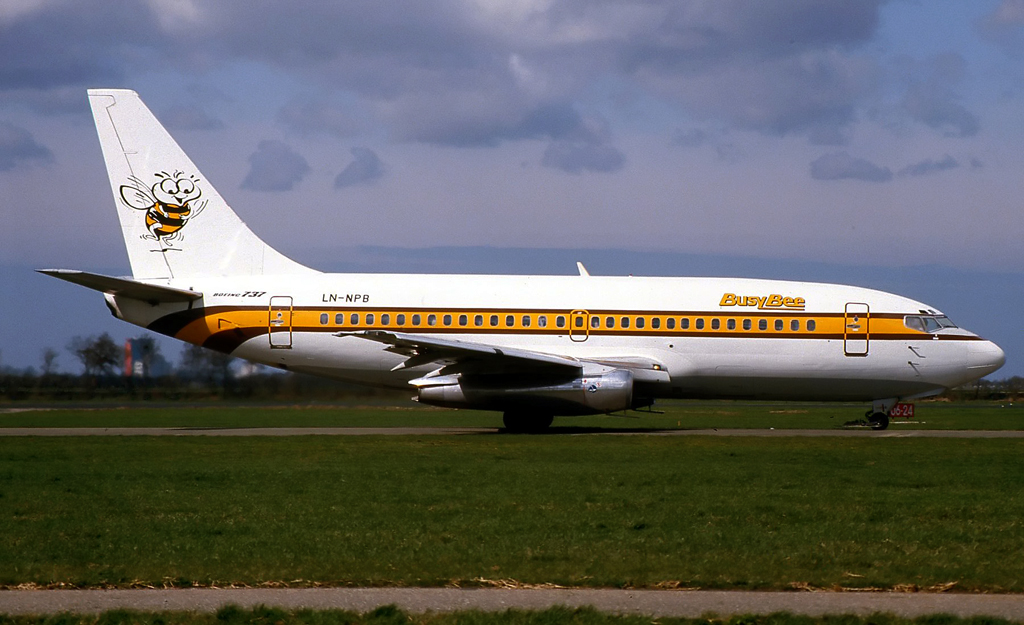
- The 737-200 involved in 1987, while operating for Busy Bee and in a previous registration
- Type: Boeing 737-200
- Operator: Sahara India Airlines
- Call sign: VICTOR INDIA ALPHA
- Registration: VT-SIA
- Flight origin: Delhi-Indira Gandhi International Airport, India
- Destination: Delhi-Indira Gandhi International Airport, India
- Occupants: 4
- Passengers: 0
- Crew: 4
- Fatalities: 4
- Survivors: 0

Second aircraft
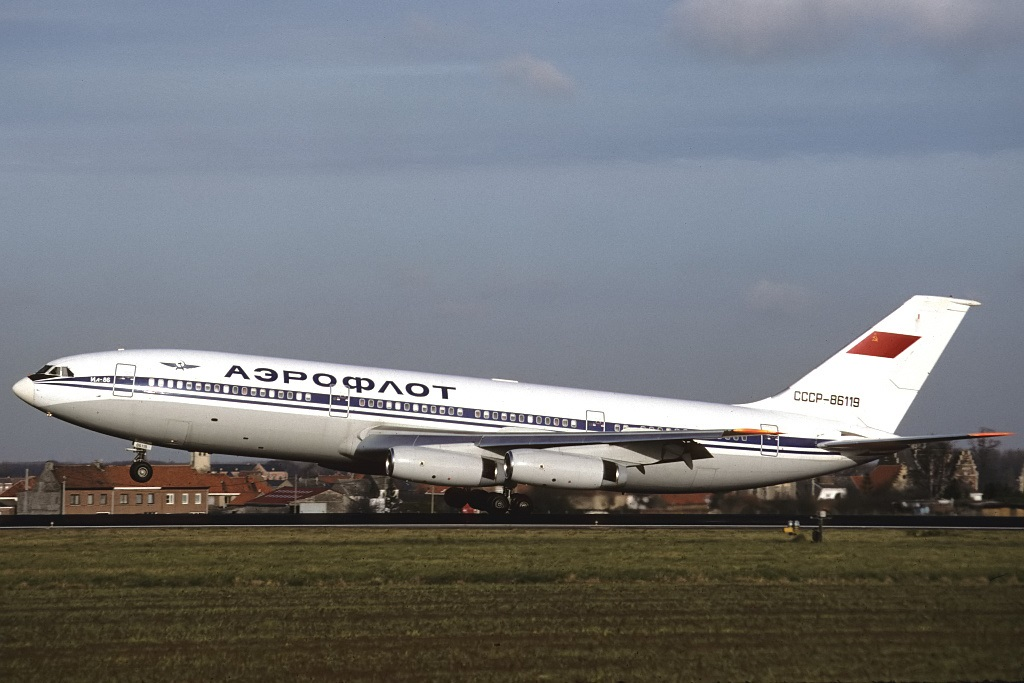
- The Ilyushin Il-86 involved in 1992 in a previous registration
- Type: Ilyushin Il-86
- Operator: Aeroflot
- IATA flight No.: SU558
- ICAO flight No.: AFL558
- Call sign: AEROFLOT 558
- Registration: RA-86119
- Flight origin: Changi Airport, Singapore
- Stopover: Delhi-Indira Gandhi International Airport, India
- Destination: Sheremetyevo International Airport, Moscow
- Occupants: 4
- Passengers: 0
- Crew: 4
- Fatalities: 4
- Survivors: 0

Ground casualties
- Ground fatalities: 1
- Ground injuries: 4

On 8 March 1994, a Sahara India Airlines Boeing 737-200 crashed shortly after takeoff during a training exercise at Delhi-Indira Gandhi International Airport, India. The plane crashed into an Aeroflot Ilyushin Il-86, which led to both aircraft being destroyed. All 6 crew members on both aircraft were killed, along with two other Aeroflot employees on the Ilyushin, while one person on the ground was killed.

== Background ==
=== Aircraft ===
The accident aircraft, a Boeing 737-200, registration number VT-SIA, was manufactured for Busy Bee in 1979 and had made its first flight on April 25, 1979. It was sold to Sahara India Airlines in October 1993 and was almost 15 years old at the time of the accident. It was equipped with 2 Pratt & Whitney JT8D-17 engines.

=== Flight crew ===
The flight crew consisted of a flight instructor and three trainee pilots.

== Accident ==
At about 2:54 pm on Tuesday, March 8, 1994, the Boeing 737-200 took off from Delhi-Indira Gandhi International Airport, India, on the sixth of a planned series of touch-and-go landings. After climbing to 400–500 feet (120–150 m), it banked left and crashed at the International Terminal apron. The wreckage collided with an Aeroflot Ilyushin Il-86 aircraft, registration number RA-86119, Flight 558, which was parked on Bay No. 45 after making an unscheduled layover and undergoing repairs. The Ilyushin was fully loaded with fuel and also caught fire as a result of the impact. Both aircraft were destroyed and all 4 crew members on board the Boeing were killed, as well as all 4 Aeroflot employees on board the Ilyushin: 2 crew members, a ground engineer, and an airport worker. Additionally, an employee of Bharat Petroleum, the airport fuel supplier, was killed on the tarmac. At least two air bridges and other ground facilities were damaged.

== Investigation ==
An investigation by the India Commercial Pilot Association (ICPA) revealed that the accident occurred due to application of the incorrect rudder by a trainee pilot during the exercise. The flight instructor, who was making his first flight as an instructor, did not guard or block the rudder control and did not give clear commands to avoid the application of the wrong rudder control by the trainee pilot.
