= Haugesund Airport =

Haugesund Airport Haugesund lufthavn
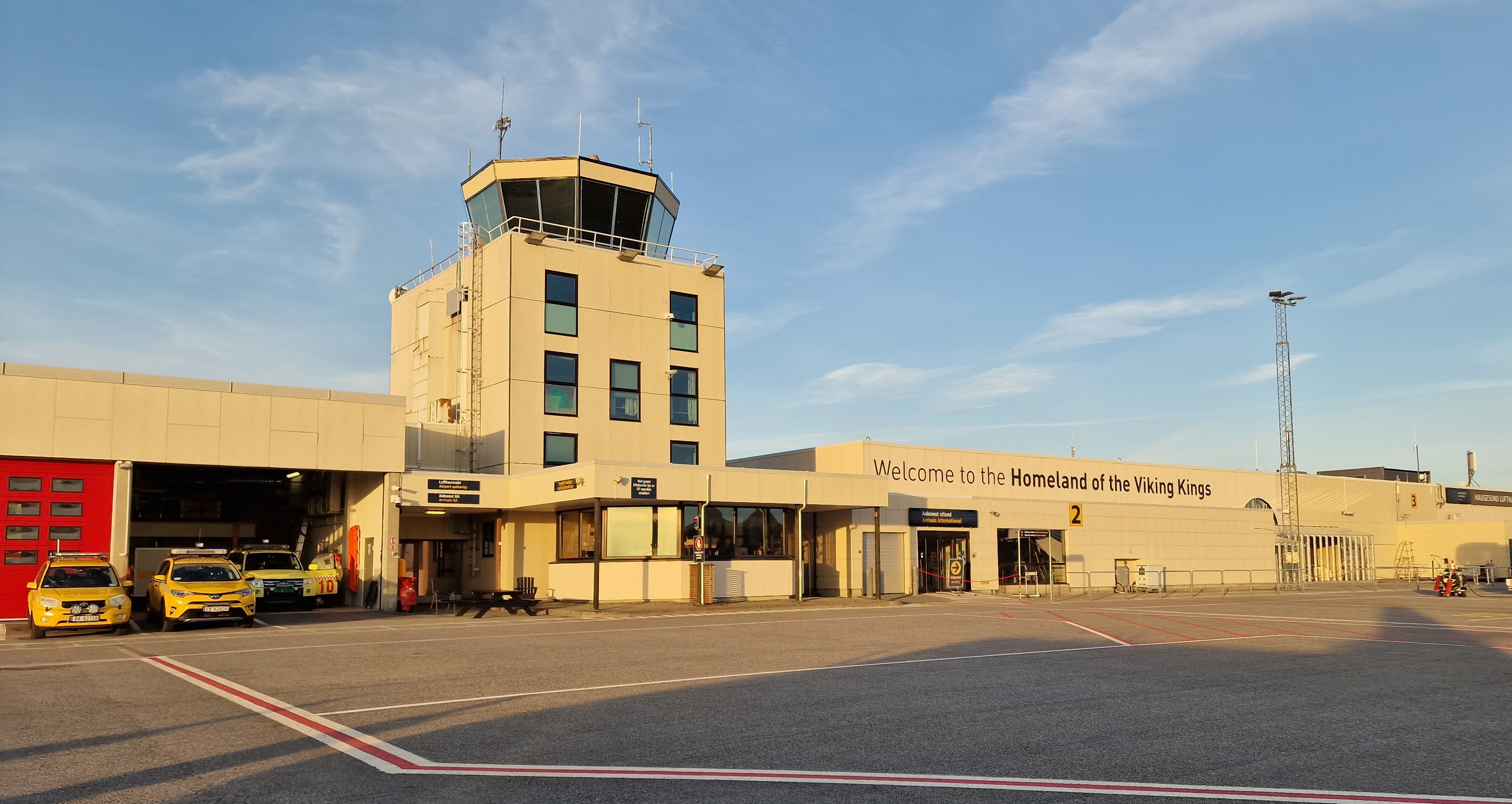
- IATA: HAU; ICAO: ENHD

Summary
- Airport type: Public
- Operator: Lufthavndrift AS
- Serves: Haugesund, Norway
- Location: Helganes, Karmøy Municipality
- Elevation AMSL: 27 m (89 ft)
- Coordinates: 59°20′36″N 005°12′45″E
- Website: flyhau.no

Map
- Location within Norway

Runways
Direction	Length		Surface
Direction	m	ft	Surface
13/31	2,120	6,955	Asphalt

Statistics (2014)
- Passengers: 694,005
- Aircraft movements: 10,265
- Cargo (tonnes): 234

Haugesund Airport (Norwegian: Haugesund lufthavn; IATA: HAU, ICAO: ENHD) is an international airport serving the Haugaland region in Norway. It is located just outside the town of Haugesund on the Helganes peninsula on the island of Karmøy in Karmøy Municipality, Rogaland county, Norway. The airport features a 2,120-meter (6,960 ft) runway aligned 13/31. Scandinavian Airlines (SAS) and Norwegian Air Shuttle provide services to Oslo. Haugesund Airport also offers discounts on international routes and has some service from low-cost carriers. The airport handled 694,005 passengers in 2014.

The airport opened on 8 April 1975. In addition to SAS flights to the capital, the airport has variously seen services by Nordsjøfly, Braathens SAFE, Busy Bee, Coast Aero Center, Coast Air Norwegian and SAS Commuter to smaller domestic destinations. A new international terminal opened in 1989. Except occasional routes to Aberdeen, regular international flights commenced in 1998. Ryanair started services in 2003, after which the runway was extended 400 meters (1,300 ft).

== History ==
=== Construction ===
Two water aerodromes served Haugesund before the opening of the airport at Helganes. Haugesund Naval Air Station was in use by the Royal Norwegian Navy Air Service from 1918 to 1919. Haugesund Airport, Storesundsskjær was taken into use in 1936 and served various coastal seaplane services operated by Widerøe, Norwegian Air Lines and West Norway Airlines until its closing in 1956.

The opening of Bergen Airport, Flesland in 1956 caused the coastal seaplane services to be terminated. Haugesund Municipality preemptively started working with plans for a land airport ahead of this. With Storesundsskjær closed, the townspeople had to travel to Stavanger Airport, Sola to catch an aircraft. A proposed feeder service was rejected and the municipal council instead asked that the state grants be used to help fund a land airport. An inter-municipal commission was established in 1954, which in November 1956 recommended that Utvik in Avaldsnes in today's Karmøy be selected as a site for a regional airport with a 600-meter (2,000 ft) runway. This led to Haugesund Municipality spending NOK 1.1 million in 1959 to buy a suitable lot there.

The 1962 state commission led by Preben Munthe recommended in a 1965 white paper that Haugesund receive an airport. It prioritized Haugesund second—after the completion of Harstad/Narvik Airport, Evenes and Kristiansund Airport, Kvernberget—and parallel with proposed airports in Leknes and Sandnessjøen. This led to a new debate about the location of an airport for Haugesund. The main concern with Utvik was that it would occupy agricultural land. Twenty-three other locations were considered by a local commission, including sites in Sveio Municipality, Tysvær Municipality, and southern Karmøy Municipality. They found Utvik and Sør-Karmøyheia to be the most suitable. The Civil Aviation Administration (later renamed Avinor) considered those places and also looked into Kongsheiene. These sites limited the runway length to 1,800 and 1,600 meters (5,900 and 5,200 ft), respectively. Karmøy Municipal Council rejected the Utvik alternative in May 1966 of concern to farmland.

At this time Helganes was launched as a proposal by its land-owner. This proposal was followed up and ultimately chosen by the authorities. Parliament approved the airport on 2 June 1972. Prior to this the inter-municipal commission had bought the land and built water, power and sewer lines to the site, costing NOK 20 million. Construction commenced in 1973 and took thirteen months, costing 65 million kr. The small lake Tyviktjønn was drained in the process, and the airport received a runway measuring 1,720 by 45 meters (5,643 by 148 ft). The first landing was a Convair Metropolitan on 22 November 1974 operated by the CAA to test the navigational aids. The official opening took place on 8 April 1975.

=== Early operations ===
The route concessions were split between Scandinavian Airlines System (SAS) and Braathens SAFE. The former was allowed to fly the route to Oslo Airport, Fornebu, while the latter was permitted to fly to Bergen and Stavanger. Braathens chose to not operate this concession. Two airlines were established at the airport in 1975: Coast Aero Center and Nordsjøfly. These both started various air taxi services.

Nordsjøfly commenced a services between Stavanger, Haugesund and Bergen in 1976. They flew three times daily to Bergen and twice daily to Stavanger, while SAS flew twice daily to Oslo. From 1979 this increased to three daily flights. In the first years the opening hours were a contended issue as the airport was closed in the middle of the day and late evenings. From 27 December 1976 a third shift was introduced, significantly increasing the airport's operational hours. The general aviation and mostly helicopter operator Fonnafly established an office at the airport the following year.

The airport opened with an instrument landing system, but only runway 13 had a localizer. This was changed in 1978, when a localizer from runway 31 was also installed. There was a political discussion about Helilift establishing an offshore helicopter terminal at Haugesund Airport, to compete with Helikopter Service which at the time was operating out of Stavanger Airport, Forus. However, the government found that there was no need for such a base.

By 1981 all the airlines at the airport were losing money. The third departure to Oslo did not generate sufficient patronage, and after threatening to terminate the extra flight, SAS introduced a surcharge on all Haugesund tickets to covers its NOK 3 million per year deficit on the route. Also Nordsjøfly was struggling, and was bought by Norving in 1981. It made an interlining agreement with KLM which allowed passengers to fly from Haugesund via Stavanger to Amsterdam for the same prices as from Stavanger. Similar agreements were soon struck with other international airlines operating out of Stavanger. After only being allowed to carry a maximum of nine passengers, Norsjøfly was from then allowed to operate the larger 19-passenger Fairchild Swearingen Metroliner.

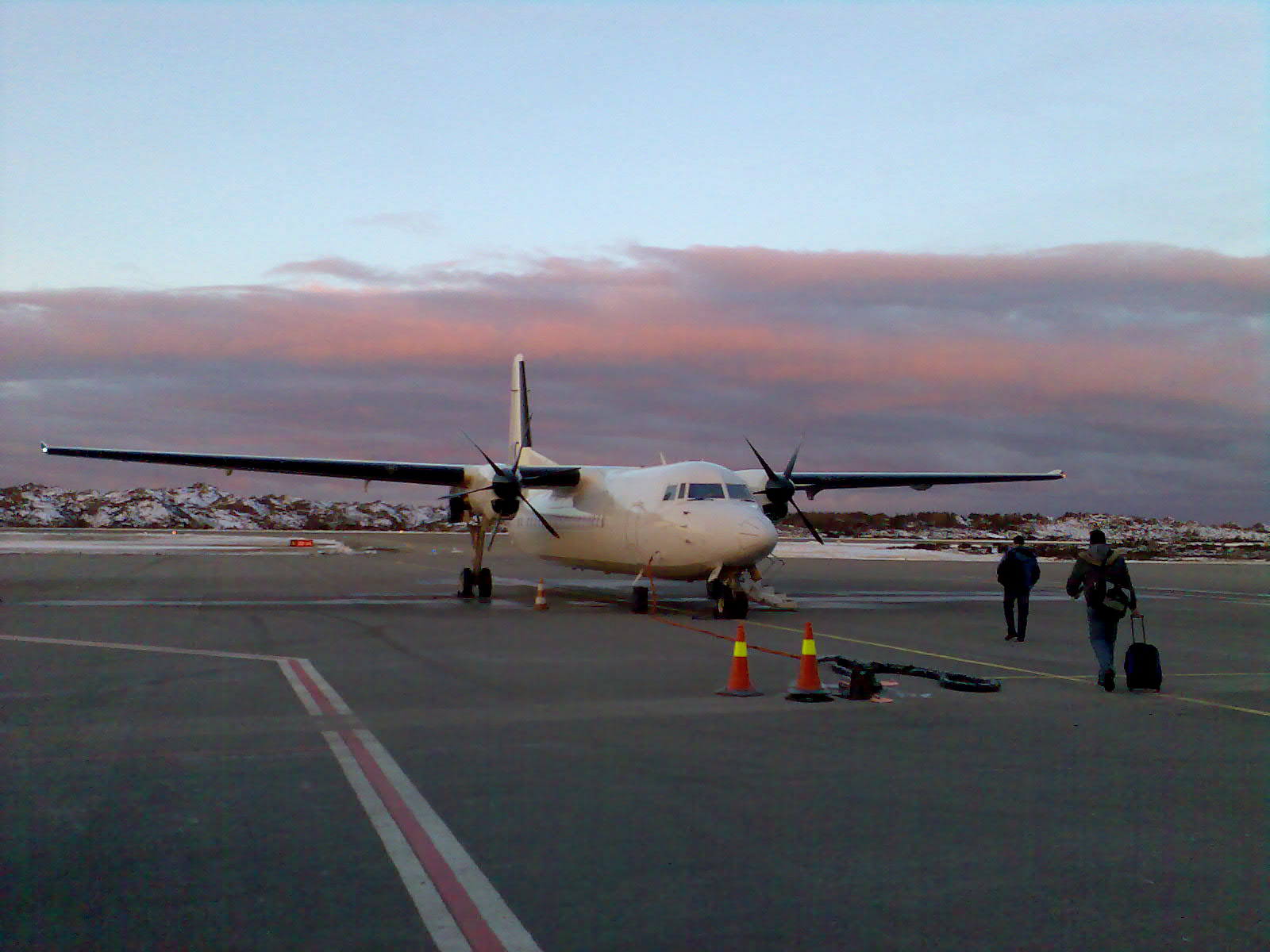
Fokker 50 at Haugesund Airport

Nordsjøfly operated with a loss every year. The airline was therefore liquidated in 1982 and the assets transferred to Norving and the Haugesund base was taken over by Norving. By then patronage was sufficient that SAS replaced its smaller Douglas DC-9-21s with the larger, 122 passenger DC-9-41s. Braathens SAFE, through its regional affiliate Busy Bee, started operated a route from Stavanger via Haugesund to Bergen in 1984, using a 44-passenger Fokker F-27 in competition with Norving. Statoil contracted Helicopter Service to operate helicopter flights to a platform on Statpipe from Karmøy. SAS introduced a fourth service in 1984, using a F-27.

The airport expanded its opening hours from 1985 when a fourth shift was hired. Coast Aero Center established the first scheduled international service in 1986, with a direct service to Aberdeen Airport using a 15-passenger Embraer EMB 110 Bandeirante. The route was soon terminated as it used a full crew shift and aircraft to make only one round trip per day.

Norving closed its base at Haugesund in November, as it gradually terminated its operations in Southern Norway due to financial difficulties. Coast Aero Center went bankrupt in 1988, but the assets were used to establish a new airline, Coast Air. It commenced services to Stavanger with de Havilland Canada Twin Otters from 1989. The airport started work on a new international terminal in 1987, allowing it to open on 18 July 1988. It included a duty-free shop and was built to serve one weekly, seasonal inclusive tour flight to Palma de Mallorca Airport. The following year the tour operators canceled all charter services from Haugesund.

Air Stord was established at Haugesund Airport in 1990. They bought Norving's former hangar, but after a buy-out instead chose to operate out of near-by Stord Airport, Sørstokken instead. Busy Bee went bankrupt in 1992 and Braathens' regional routes were allocated to Norwegian Air Shuttle, who operated with Fokker 50s. Coast Air commenced two scheduled services from Haugesund in 1994. One was to Bergen and Kristiansand Airport, Kjevik, the other flew to Fagernes Airport, Leirin and onwards to Oslo. From 9 to 13 July 1995 the runway was re-asphalted, during which time the airport was closed.

=== Competition and runway extension ===
The aviation club shut down in 1996 after financial difficulties for many years. The Fagernes route was terminated the same year when Coast Air lost the tender to operate it. Instead they opened a service to Aberdeen from 1997.

The aviation market in Norway was deregulated from 1 April 1994, but not until the 1998 opening of Oslo Airport, Gardermoen were there sufficient slots available at the capital airport for Braathens to introduce routes to Haugesund. This took place on 25 October 1998 with five daily services. SAS increased their daily services from five to six. On top of this, Coast Air commenced flights to Sandefjord Airport, Torp a few days a week. From November Sun-Air followed up with three weekly services to Billund Airport in Denmark. SAS established two daily services to Copenhagen Airport from early 1999 with a Fokker 50. However, without a morning departure it had little patronage as it was faster to reach the Danish capital via Oslo. SAS thus terminated the service after a year, as did Sun-Air to Billund.

A committee was established in 1995 to look into the possibility of lengthening the runway. The initial reasoning was to serve long-haul fish export aircraft. With the introduction of McDonnell Douglas MD-80 aircraft, SAS oftentimes could not operate them at their maximum take-off weight. This sometimes meant that not all seats could be sold. Therefore, SAS continued to use DC-9s on as many departures as possible out of Haugesund. The main concern was not the cost incurred by lengthening the runway per ce, but rather that building past a decarled distance of 1,600 meters (5,200 ft) would cause the shoulders to have to be expanded from 75 to 150 meters (246 to 492 ft). Three investment groups offered to buy the airport and make it a "gateway" to Western Norway. The CAA had meetings with Wiggins, but stated that no Norwegian airports were for sale. Wiggins instead proposed a lease where they would invest NOK 630 million in the aerodrome, including a hotel complex.

The increased number of flights caused expansion of the terminal, which opened in September 1999. However, after failing to make money on the new route, Braathens pulled out of the Oslo service in November 1999. Braathens reduced its services to Bergen in January 2000, after which Coast Air responded by increasing its services. However, the airline closed the Aberdeen route the following year.

Coast Air started its first head-on competition with Scandinavian Airlines on 2 June 2003. Using the ATR 42, it introduced two daily services from Haugesund to Oslo. By September this had increased to three, and tickets were selling as low as NOK 500. SAS responded with a 22-percent cut in ticket prices. Coast Air lost NOK 11 million on the price war during 2003, and was ultimately forced to withdraw from the route in May 2004. The case was investigated by the Norwegian Competition Authority based on accusations of SAS carrying out illegal price dumping on the route. They issued a fine of NOK 20 million, but the case ended in Oslo District Court, where Scandinavian Airlines was acquitted. Though initially appealed by the authority, the matter was settled out-of-court in December 2007, in which the airline agreed that they had broken the law, but that since it took place immediately the act came into power, they would not have to pay the fine.

SAS Commuter took over Norwegian Air Shuttle's services from 1 April 2003. Inclusive tour charters commenced again in 2004, after a fourteen-year drought. Braathens and SAS merged to create SAS Braathens in May 2004, with the new airline taking over the Oslo route. It passed on the Scandinavian Airlines in 2007.

Parliament decided that five Avinor airports would be allowed to issue ninety percent discount on take-off charges on international routes. This accounted in 2004 to NOK 4,800 per flight for a Boeing 737-200. However, they still had to pay full terminal, security and air navigation service charges. This allowed Haugesund to establish itself as a "low-cost" airport for low-cost carriers. Ryanair started looking at Haugesund as a destination in 2002, hoping to serve both Rogaland and Hordaland from one airport. However, they demanded that the runway be lengthened if they were to use Karmøy. It launched its inaugural daily route to London Stansted Airport on 30 April 2003. By using the smaller Boeing 737-200 aircraft the airline could as an interim solution get by with the short runway—the shortest of any airport served by the airline.

To finance the longer runway, the inter-municipal power company Haugaland Kraft established Lufthavnutvikling to finance the construction. In exchange, they were given a portion of the revenue from increased traffic. Clearing started in 2002 and construction began in mid-2003. The runway was lengthened by 400 meters (1,300 ft) to a length of 2,120 meters (6,960 ft) and declared lengths of 2,000 meters (6,600 ft). This allowed both Ryanair and SAS, as well as any charter operators, to operate a fully loaded Boeing 737-800. The expansion cost NOK 90 million and the agreement had a duration for fifteen years, during which time the company received a percentage of revenue from duty-free and parking generated from international services. Lufthavnutvikling was privatized in 2006 and by 2014 there was a controversy regarding the legality of the agreement, following changes to European Union regulations regarding airport subsidies. Further extension of the runway is difficult since the shoreline is at the northwest end of the runway while the flight path to the southeast passes over a water tower that is currently just clear the required safety margins.

Ryanair introduced its second service, to Bremen Airport in Germany, on 4 June 2007. Meanwhile, Coast Air introduced direct services from Haugesund to Copenhagen. The company filed for bankruptcy on 23 January 2008. In the wake, Widerøe commenced a twice-daily service to Copenhagen starting on 30 March 2008. Patronage was too low and the route was terminated by the end of the year. Norwegian returned to Haugesund on 19 August 2009 with three daily services to Oslo.

SAS Commuter's route to Bergen was taken over by Widerøe in 2010, but closed in October 2016 due to fee rises and lack of demand. The airline resumed the Copenhagen route on 30 October 2011, operating a single daily round trip. Ryanair expanded its portfolio from 27 March 2012 with seasonal routes to Palma de Mallorca, Alicante Airport and Pisa Airport. Wizz Air introduced services to Gdańsk Lech Wałęsa Airport from 4 April.

== Facilities ==
The airport is situated on the peninsula of Helganes in Karmøy. The airport features a terminal building with a domestic and international departure hall, residing at a reference elevation of 27 metres (89 ft) above mean sea level. It has one runway designated 13/31 with an asphalt surface measuring 2,120 by 45 meters (6,955 ft × 148 ft). It has a takeoff run available (TORA) of 2,060 meters (6,760 ft) and a landing distance available (LDA) of 2,000 meters (6,600 ft). The airport is equipped with an instrument landing system and category 7 fire and rescue service.

== Airlines and destinations ==
Scandinavian Airlines, mostly with E195-family aircraft and Norwegian Air Shuttle with Boeing 737 aircraft both operate daily services to Oslo. Wizz Air operates several weekly services to Gdańsk. Ryanair ended all its flights to Haugesund after its agreement expired in October 2022, its seasonal summer routes to Malaga and Alicante are to be operated by Norwegian from 2023. Operation of the airport ran at a deficit of 20 million kr in 2012. Haugesund Airport served 694,005 passengers, 10,265 aircraft movements and handled 234 tonnes of cargo. This makes Haugesund the eleventh-busiest airport in the country.

Airlines	Destinations
Norwegian Air Shuttle	Alicante, Oslo; Seasonal: Málaga
Scandinavian Airlines	Oslo; Seasonal charter: Chania, Gran Canaria, Palma de Mallorca
Widerøe	Bergen
Wizz Air	Gdańsk

== Ground transport ==
The airport is situated at the terminus of European Road E134, between fifteen and twenty minutes drive from the town center of Haugesund. There is parking for 900 cars at the airport; taxis and car rental is also available.

Airport bus service to the airport ended in October 2024. Travel time to Stavanger is 1:40 hours and to Bergen 3:00 hours. Both involve a ferry ride.

== Bibliography ==
- Hafstad, Bjørn; Arheim, Tom (2003). Marinens flygevåpen 1912–1944 (in Norwegian). TankeStreken. ISBN 82-993535-1-3.
- Melling, Kjersti (2009). Nordavind fra alle kanter (in Norwegian). Oslo: Pilotforlaget.
- Reitan, Sverre Utne (2003). Luftfarten på Haugalandet fra 1914 til 2004 (in Norwegian). Karmøy: Eget Forlag.
