= Ludvig G. Braathen =

Norwegian entrepreneur (1891–1976)

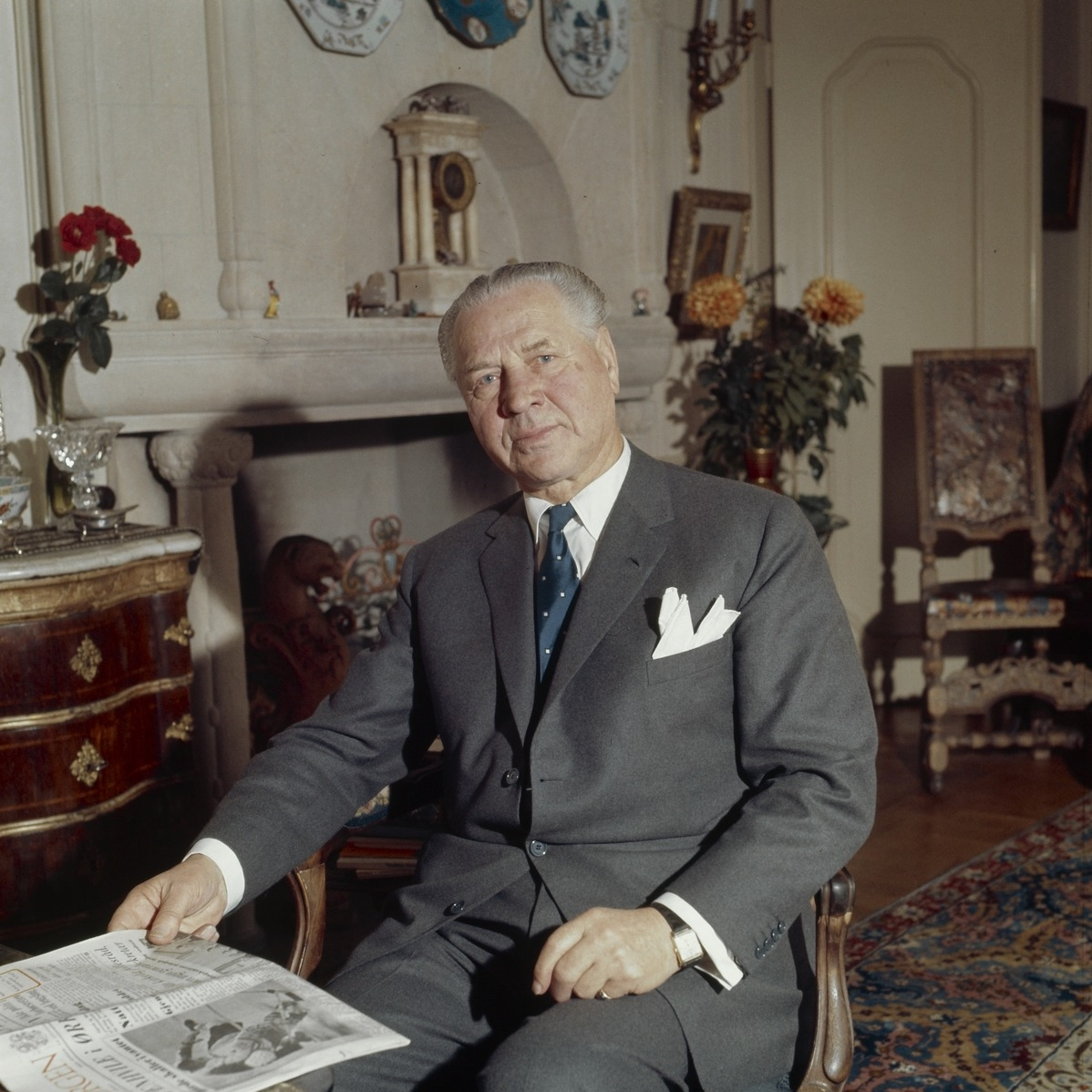
- Ludvig G. Braathen in 1960's
- Born: 17 March 1891; Drammen, Norway
- Died: 27 December 1976 (aged 85); Oslo, Norway
- Occupation: Entrepreneur
- Known for: Founded Braathens Rederi and Braathens SAFE

Ludvig Gustav Braathen (17 March 1891 – 27 December 1976) was a Norwegian entrepreneur that founded the shipping company Ludvig G. Braathens Rederi and the airline Braathens SAFE. He was CEO of both companies until his death.

== Biography ==
Braathen grew up as one of seven siblings in Drammen. He started studying commercial studies as a 15-year-old in Drammen, and later at Treiders Handelsskole in Oslo. In his youth, Braathen wanted to become an entrepreneur, preferably within the lumber industry. He started working for a furniture wood dealer. In 1909, he changed jobs, and started working for ship-owner E. B. Aaby in Strømsø. In 1913, he moved to Cardiff in Wales, where he worked for Vivyan Kelly & Company as a head of department. He planned to travel to Argentina and China, each for two years, but the outbreak of World War I in 1914 forced Braathen to return home, where he served as a conscript in the Norwegian Royal Guards. After one year, he was hired as an administrator for ship-owner B. A. Sanne in Oslo. When Sanne died in 1922, Braathen was hired as CEO, along with Sanne's son.

In 1926, Braathen started his own shipping company: Braathens Rederi A/S. He invested all his savings, 25,000 kr, along with some capital from one of the captains and a broker. Another NOK 25,000 was borrowed. He bought several small ships that were put into service on routes from Europe to China. The first tanker was bought in 1929 and by 1936, the company had ships totalling 56,000 tonnes.

Braathen has stated that the idea of creating an airline occurred to him in 1936, when the ship Brajara had engine trouble while en route to Japan. The Japanese shipyards could not guarantee that they could repair the ship, and at first it was considered whether the ship should be towed to Europe for repairs. The solution chosen was instead to have the necessary piece made in Amsterdam and flown to Japan by KLM. In 1937, Braathen travelled to the United States to study aviation, and he looked both at flying boats and took a Douglas DC-3 operated by Trans World Airlines from Kansas City to San Francisco. In 1938, Braathen sent an application to the Norwegian authorities to receive concession and subsidies to start a route from Oslo to New York City. This was rejected, since the authorities did not feel the time was right to give subsidies for such a route.

On 26 March 1946, Braathens Rederi established an airline called Braathens South American & Far East Airtransport (Braathens SAFE), a subsidiary that bought several Douglas DC-4 aircraft to start charter flights to the Far East and South America. The main intention was to supply his ships with supplies and crews, in addition to providing a service for other shipping companies and travelers. Braathen remained CEO of the company until his death, when the company was taken over by his son Bjørn G. Braathen.
