= List of companies of Guatemala =

Location of Guatemala

Guatemala is a country in Central America bordered by Mexico to the north and west, the Pacific Ocean to the southwest, Belize to the northeast, the Caribbean to the east, Honduras to the east and El Salvador to the southeast. Gross domestic product (GDP) in purchasing power parity (PPP) in 2010 was estimated at US$70.15 billion. The service sector was the largest component of GDP at 63%, followed by the industry sector at 23.8% and the agriculture sector at 13.2% (2010 est.). Mines produce gold, silver, zinc, cobalt and nickel. The agricultural sector accounted for about two-fifths of exports, and half of the labor force. Organic coffee, sugar, textiles, fresh vegetables, and bananas were the country's main exports. Inflation was 3.9% in 2010.

== Notable firms ==
This list includes notable companies with primary headquarters located in the country. The industry and sector follow the Industry Classification Benchmark taxonomy. Organizations which have ceased operations are included and noted as defunct.

Notable companies Status: P=Private, S=State; A=Active, D=Defunct
| Name | Industry | Sector | Headquarters | Founded | Notes | Status | |
|---|---|---|---|---|---|---|---|
| Aeroquetzal | Consumer services | Airlines | Guatemala City | 1991 | Airline, defunct 1992 | P | D |
| Aerovías | Consumer services | Airlines | Guatemala City | 1977 | Airline, defunct 1998 | P | D |
| Aviateca | Consumer services | Airlines | Guatemala City | 1929 | Airline, now part of Avianca (Colombia) | P | A |
| Aviones Comerciales de Guatemala (Avcom) | Consumer services | Airlines | Guatemala City | 1929 | Airline, defunct 2009 | P | D |
| Corporación Multi Inversiones | Conglomerates | - | Guatemala City | 1920 | Food & beverage, retail, real estate, financials | P | A |
| DHL de Guatemala | Industrials | Delivery services | Guatemala City | 1991 | Cargo airline | P | A |
| Helicópteros de Guatemala | Consumer services | Airlines | Guatemala City | 1971 | Charter airline | P | A |
| Malher | Consumer goods | Food products | Guatemala City | 1957 | Food producer | P | A |
| Mayan World Airlines | Consumer services | Airlines | Guatemala City | 1996 | Airline, defunct 1999 | P | D |
| RACSA | Consumer services | Airlines | Guatemala City | 2004 | Airline | P | A |
| Tikal Jets Airlines | Consumer services | Airlines | Guatemala City | 1992 | Airline, defunct 2006 | P | D |
| Trama Textiles | Consumer goods | Clothing & accessories | Quetzaltenango | 1988 | Textiles | P | A |
| Transportes Aéreos Guatemaltecos | Consumer services | Airlines | Guatemala City | 1969 | Airline | P | A |

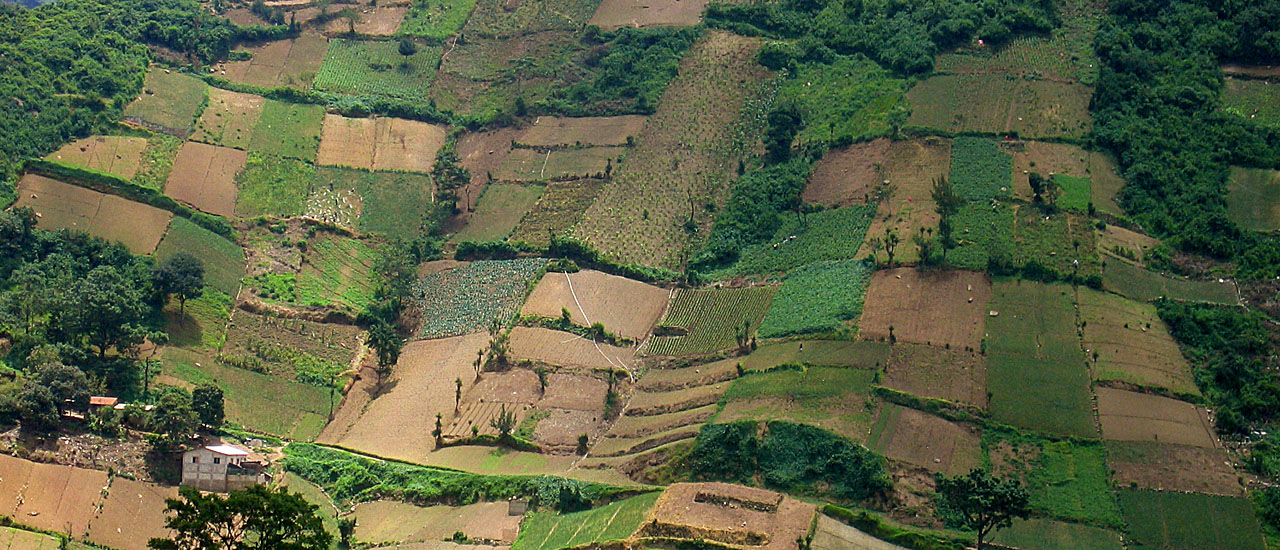
Fields in Quetzaltenango

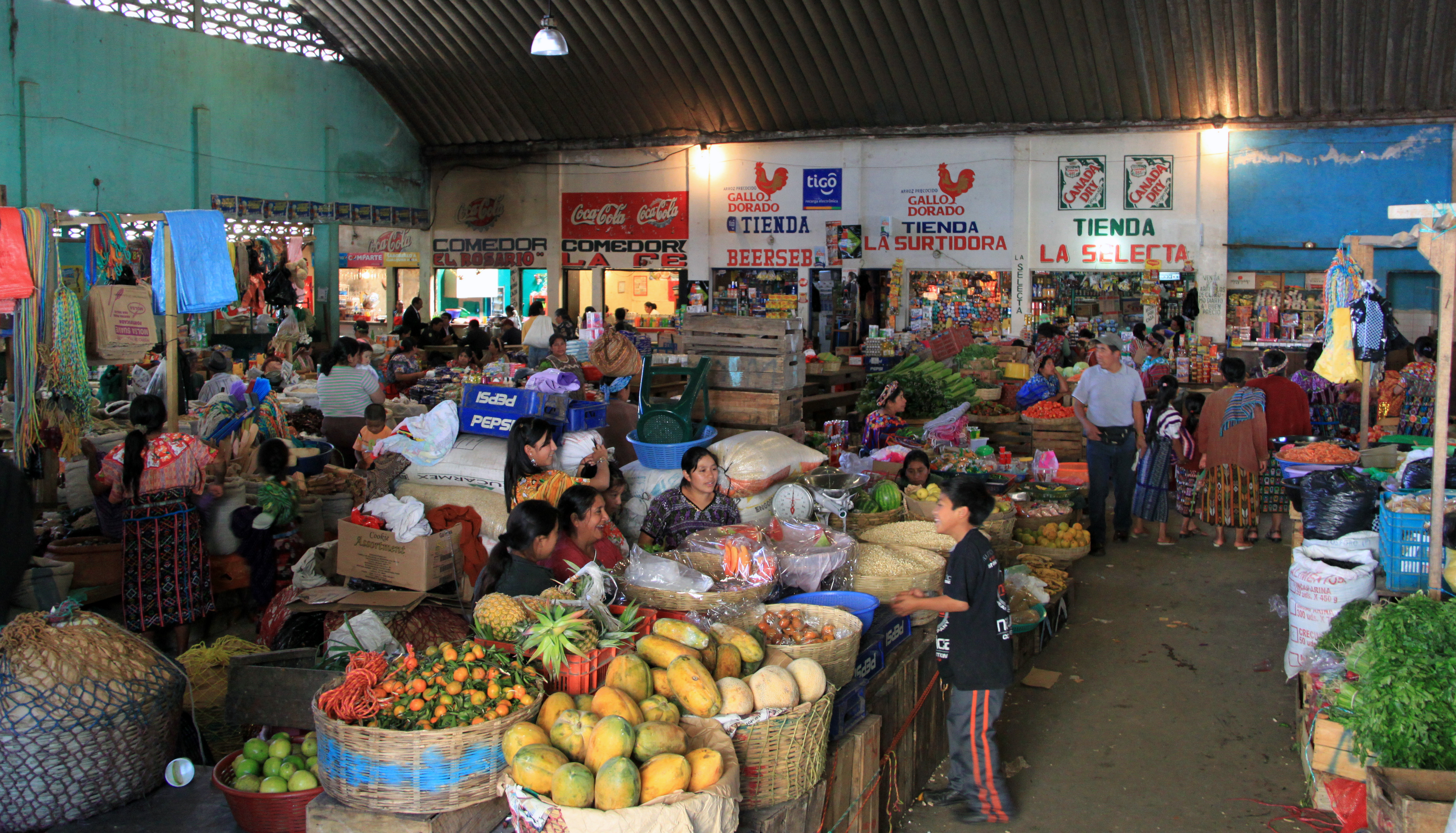
An indoor market in the regional city of Zunil

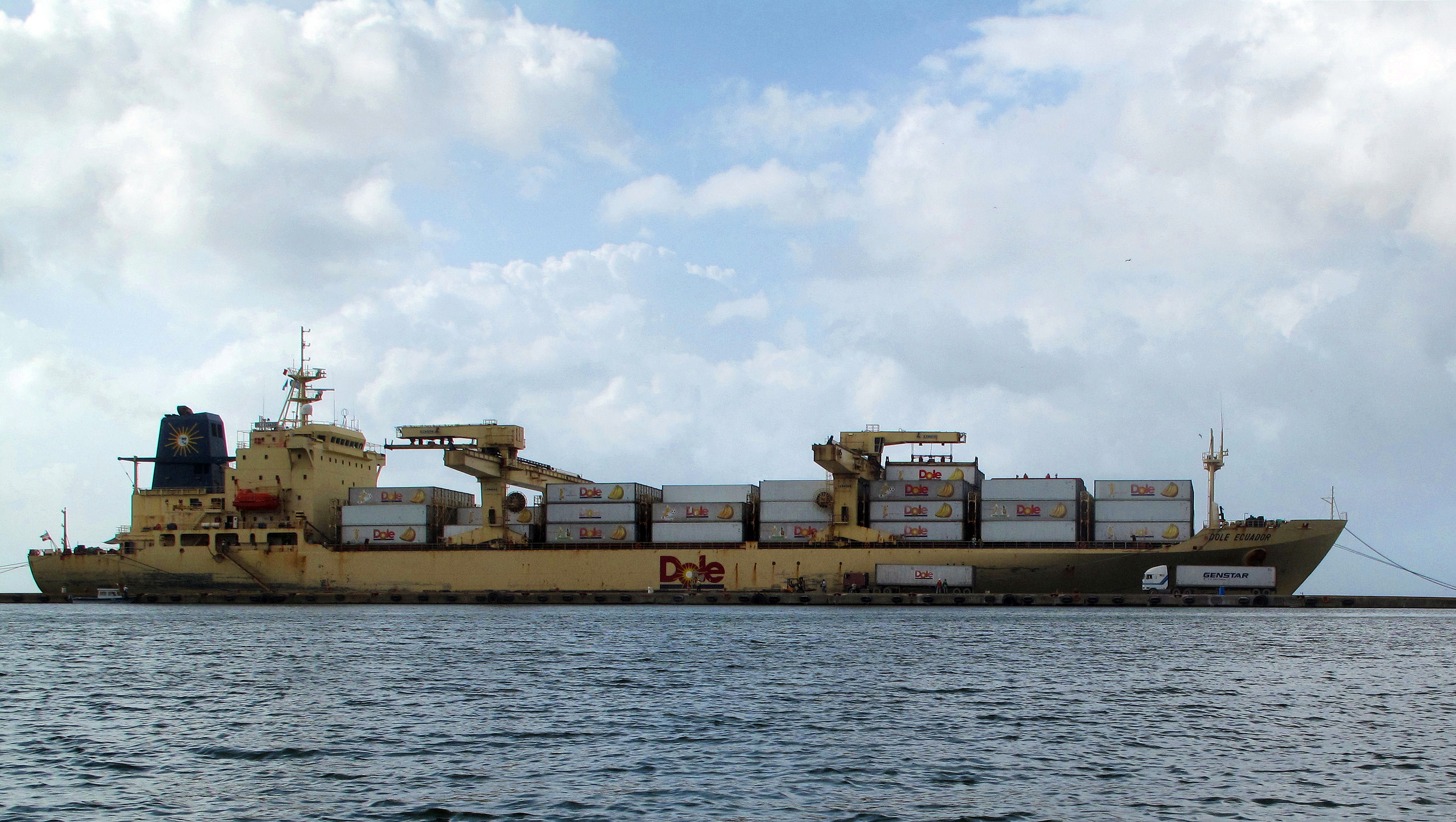
A ship picking up Guatemalan bananas for export

== See also ==
- List of airlines of Guatemala
