= HDG =

HDG may refer to:

- Handan Airport, in Hebei Province, China
- Hans-Dietrich Genscher, leader of the German Free Democratic Party and longest-serving Vice Chancellor in German history.
- Haus der Geschichte, a museum in Bonn, Germany
- Havre de Grace, Maryland, a city in the United States
- HDG International Group, an American energy company
- Horizontal Working Party on Drugs (formerly Horizontal Drug Group), a preparatory body of the Council of the European Union
- Hot dip galvanised steel, which consists of a cold reduced steel substrate onto which a layer of zinc is coated via a hot dip process to impart enhanced corrosion properties onto the base steel
- Heading (disambiguation)
- Heald Green railway station, in England
- Helicópteros de Guatemala, a Guatemalan helicopter operator
- Hunter Douglas, a Dutch window manufacturer
