= List of airlines of Guatemala =

This is a list of airlines currently operating in Guatemala.

== Active ==
Airline	Image	IATA	ICAO	Callsign	Founded	Notes
ARM Aviación			MMG	RUTA MAYA	1994	
Avianca Guatemala		GU	GUG	AVIATECA	2013	
DHL de Guatemala		L3	JOS		1989	
Helicópteros de Guatemala					1971	
Transportes Aéreos Guatemaltecos		5U	TGU	CHAPIN	1969	

== Defunct ==
Airline	Image	IATA	ICAO	Callsign	Founded	Ceased operations	Notes
Aero Express					1974	1990	
Aeroquetzal		AW		AEROQUETZAL	1987	1992	
Aerovías		XU	AOQ	AEROVÍAS	1977	1998	
Aerovías de Guatemala					1929	1945	Rebranded to Aviateca
Air Venture Tours					2006	2015	
Aviateca		GU	GUG	AVIATECA	1945	2013	Rebranded as Avianca Guatemala
Aviones Comerciales de Guatemala					1954	2009	
Inter Regional		9O	TSP	TRANSPO-INTER	1999	2013	Merged into Avianca Guatemala
Líneas Aéreas Mayas					1987	1990	
Mayan World Airlines		EY	MYN	MAYAN WORLD	1996	1998	
RACSA		R6		RACSA	2001	2009	
Tikal Jets Airlines		WU	TKC	TIKAL	1992	2006	
Transportes Aéreos Profesionales					1991	2000	

== See also ==
- List of airlines of the Americas
- List of defunct airlines of the Americas
- List of airports in Guatemala
