= Mey-Air =

Charter airline company from Norway

IATA	ICAO	Call sign
none	MT	MARITIME
- Founded: 1970
- Ceased operations: 1974
- Operating bases: Oslo Airport, Fornebu
- Fleet size: 4
- Headquarters: Oslo, Norway
- Key people: Hans Otto Meyer

Mey-Air Transport A/S, trading as Mey-Air, was a Norwegian charter airline which operated from 1970 to 1974. Owned by shipping owner Hans Otto Meyer, the company flew both smaller ad hoc charter as well as inclusive tour (IT). Initially operating a varied fleet of ten Cessna, Beechcraft, Convair CV-240 and NAMC YS-11, these were largely sold in 1972 to make way for two Boeing 737-200. The company filed for bankruptcy following the demise of the charter market after the 1973 oil crisis.

== History ==
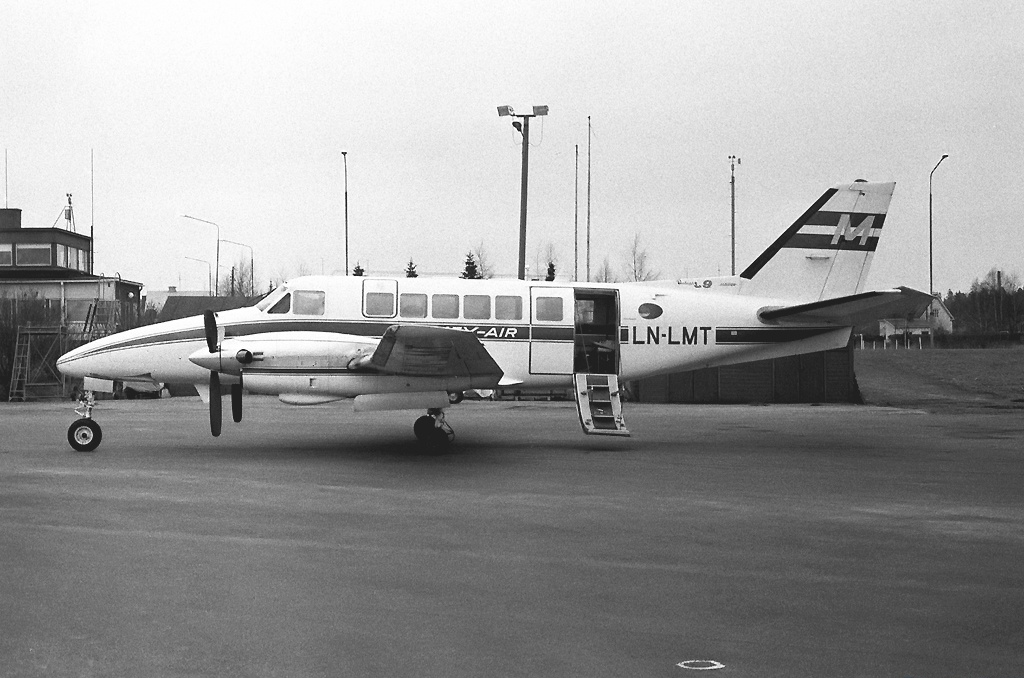
Beechcraft Queen Air at Tampere–Härmälä Airport in 1971

Mey-Air was established as a charter airline in 1970, by shipping owner Hans Otto Meyer. Based at the then secondary Oslo Airport, Gardermoen, it intended both to target the ad hoc as well as the inclusive tour charter market. It initially took over two Convair CV-240 from Meyer, although these were sold in 1970 and 1971. The airline followed up by buying eight aircraft of six different types, consisting of a Cessna 401, a Cessna 402B, a Cessna 421, two NAMC YS-11, two Beechcraft Queen Air, and a Beechcraft King Air 100. These aircraft were quickly sold, and by the end of 1972 only the Cessna 401 was still in service.

During 1970 Mey-Air operated a newspaper services out of Oslo to Copenhagen and onwards to Amsterdam and Paris. The Queenliners were used for this route. The IT market was undergoing a dramatic boom during this period, and in 1971 Mey-Air acquired two Boeing 737-200 for Mediterranean IT flights. Their only later aircraft acquisition was a 1973 purchase of a Cessna 150 and a Convair CV-240.

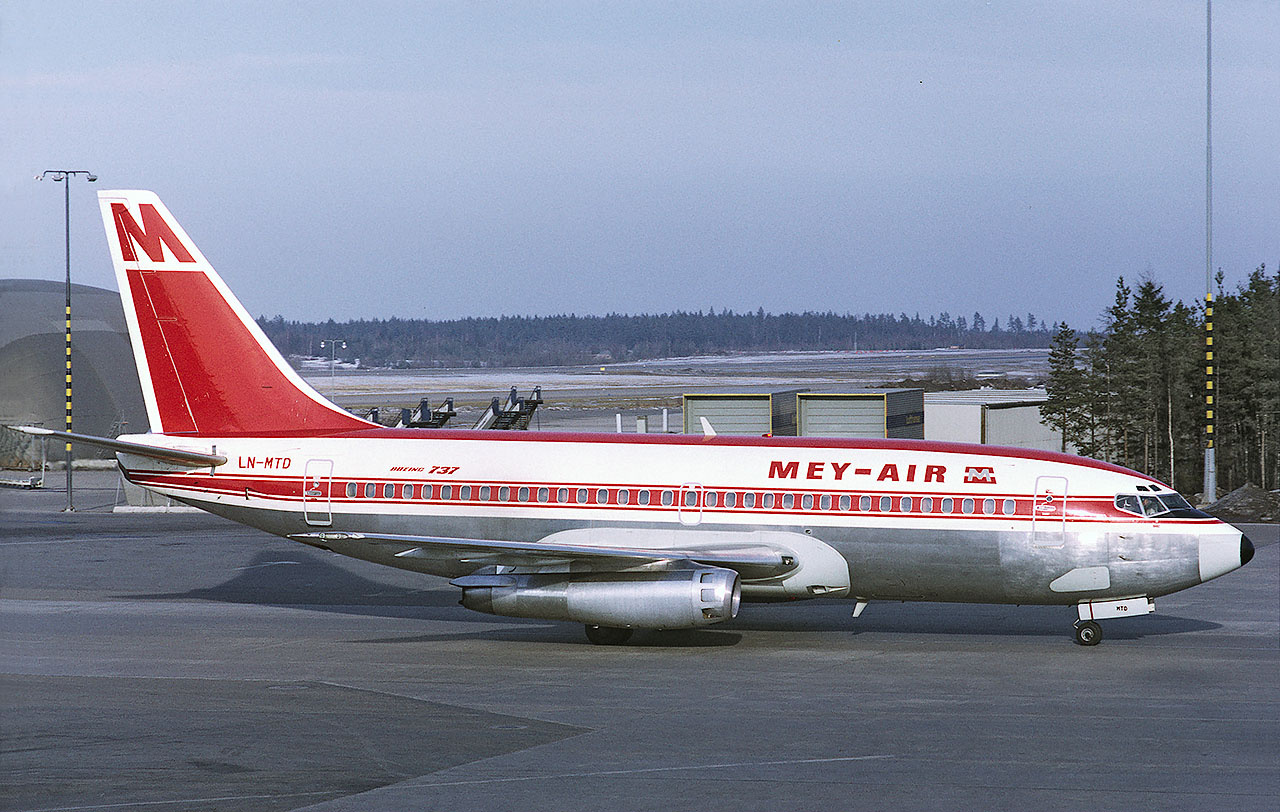
Boeing 737-200 at Stockholm Arlanda Airport in 1972

Mey-Air showed interest in 1972 in acquiring their concessions to operate the routes out of Skien Airport, Geiteryggen. Despite the bankruptcy of the incumbent, Fjellfly, Mey-Air withdrew their interest in the routes. Starting in December 1972, Mey-Air started a cooperation with Falkereiser to fly Danish tourists to Norway. This agreement would become a liability as Mey-Air was not paid in full and eventually became creditor of the tour operator after it went bankrupt in 1974. One of the 737s is prominently featured as the hijacked aircraft in the 1974 feature film Ransom (known in North America and some countries as The Terrorists).

Following the 1973 oil crisis, Mey-Air was, similar to other IT airlines, adversely affected. Costs rose while charter rates declined, making it impossible to run with a profit. Mey-Air ceased operations on 22 February 1974 and filed for bankruptcy two days later.

== Fleet ==
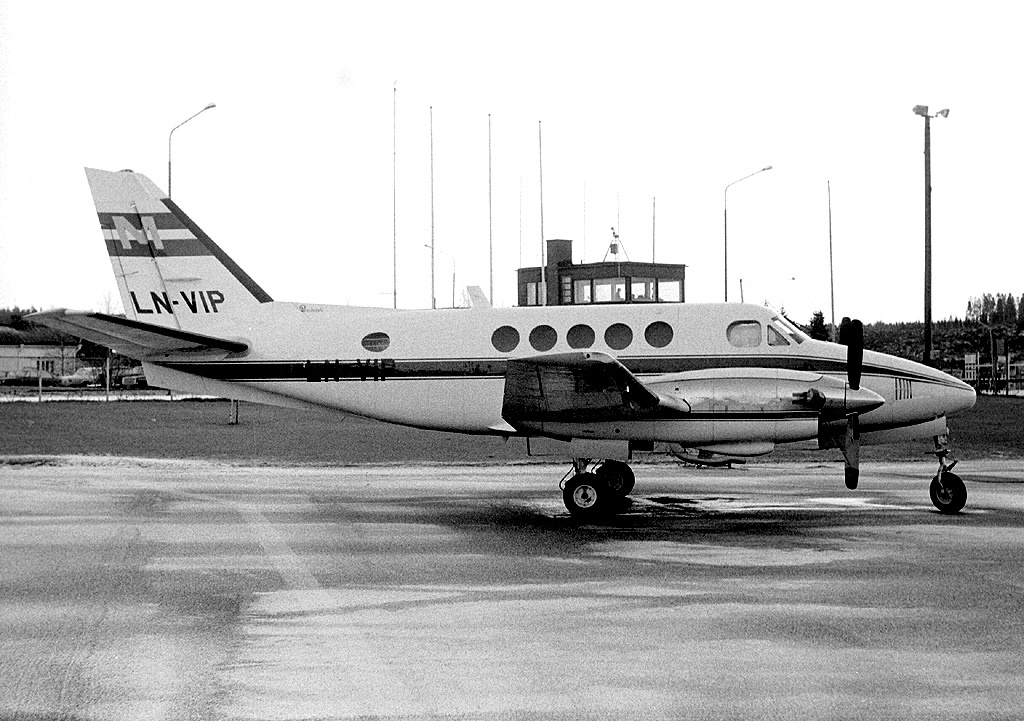
Beechcraft King Air

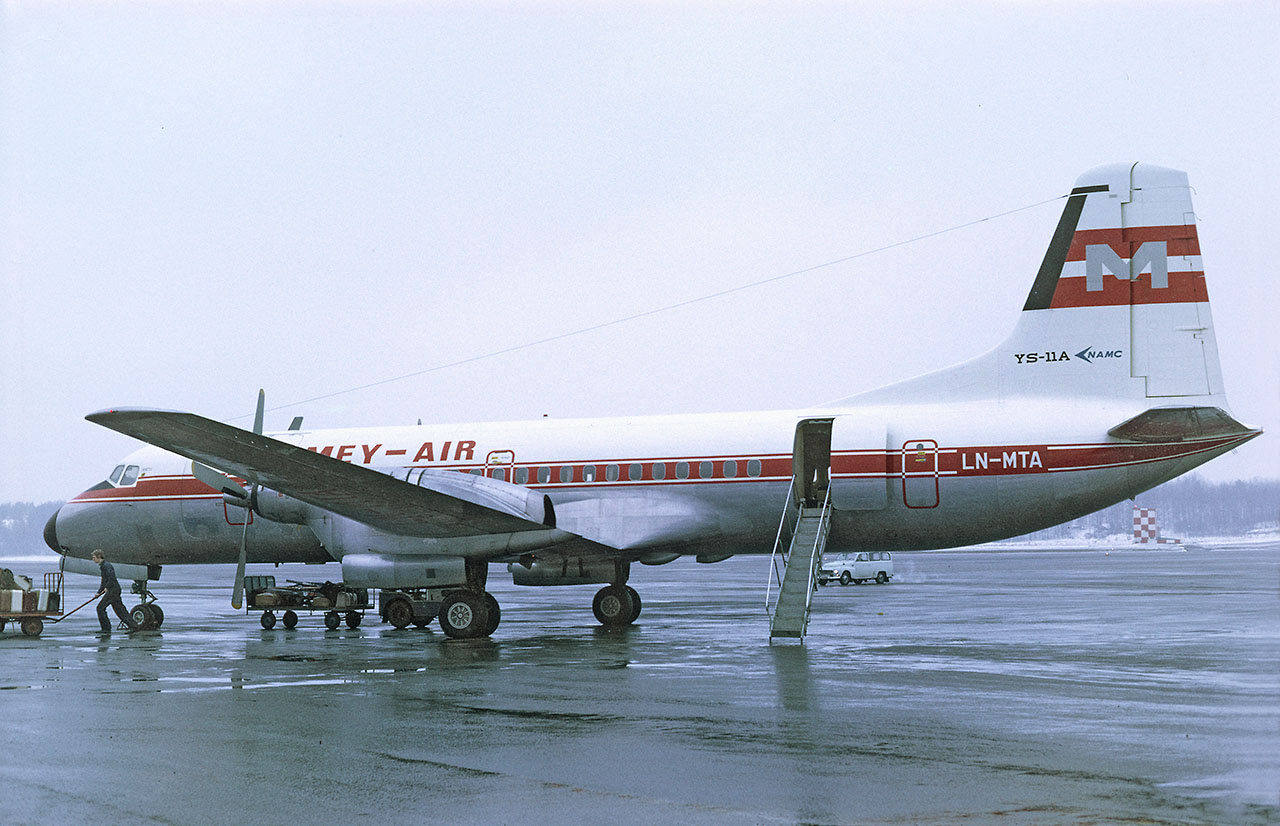
NAMC YS-11

The following is a list of aircraft operated by Mey-Air. It contains the model, the accumulated number of aircraft operated (which may exceed the peak count), the year built, the year the type first entered service with the airline, and the year the last unit was retired.

Mey-Air aircraft
Model	Qty	Built	First in	Last out	Ref(s)
Convair CV-240	2	1949	1969	1974	
Cessna 401	1	1969	1970	1974	
Cessna 402B	1	1970	1970	1972	
Cessna 421	1	1969	1970	1970	
NAMC YS-11	2	1969	1970	1971	
Beechcraft Queen Air	2	1970	1970	1972	
Beechcraft King Air 100	1	1969	1970	1971	
Boeing 737-200	2	1970	1971	1974	
Cessna 150	1	1968	1973	1974	

== Bibliography ==
- Hagby, Kay (1998). Fra Nielsen & Winther til Boeing 747 (in Norwegian). Drammen: Hagby. ISBN 8299475201.
