= Viking International Airlines =

IATA	ICAO	Call sign
VO	VIK	VIKING
- Founded: March 6 1969
- Ceased operations: March 1994
- Parent company: Eagle Air
- Headquarters: 7851 Metro Parkway, Suite 314, 55420, Minneapolis, MN

Viking International Airlines was an airline based out of Minneapolis St. Paul that operated from 1969 to 1994 which operated from Minnesota, Iowa, Michigan and Illinois. Initially the airline would utilize the Beech D18 and Douglas DC-3.

== History ==
Viking International Airlines was founded in 1969 using the Beech D18 and Douglas DC-3. In 1981 it operated two Convair 600 airliners.

During the 1980s the airline would be bought by the Hartford based Corporate Air.

The airline would declare bankruptcy in 1991 and would be sold to Las Vegas based Eagle Air who kept the cargo division as part of the operations of the airline until 1994 when Viking would end up ceasing operations.

== See also ==
- List of defunct airlines of the United States
