= Ransom (1975 film) =

- Film poster
- Directed by: Caspar Wrede
- Written by: Paul Wheeler
- Produced by: Peter Rawley
- Starring: Sean Connery; Ian McShane
- Cinematography: Sven Nykvist
- Edited by: Eric Boyd-Perkins
- Music by: Jerry Goldsmith
- Production companies: Lion International; Rawley Film & Theatre
- Distributed by: British Lion Films
- Release date: 27 February 1975
- Running time: 94 minutes
- Country: United Kingdom
- Language: English
- Budget: $1.5 million

Ransom, known in North America and some countries as The Terrorists, is a 1975 British crime film starring Sean Connery and Ian McShane and directed by Finnish director Caspar Wrede.

== Plot ==
A small group of terrorists have seized the British ambassador to the fictitious country of "Scandinavia", and are holding him hostage in his residence. Scandinavia's head of security, Col. Nils Tahlvik, wants to take an uncompromising position, but he is overruled by the governments of both Scandinavia and Britain, who insist that all of the terrorists' demands be met.

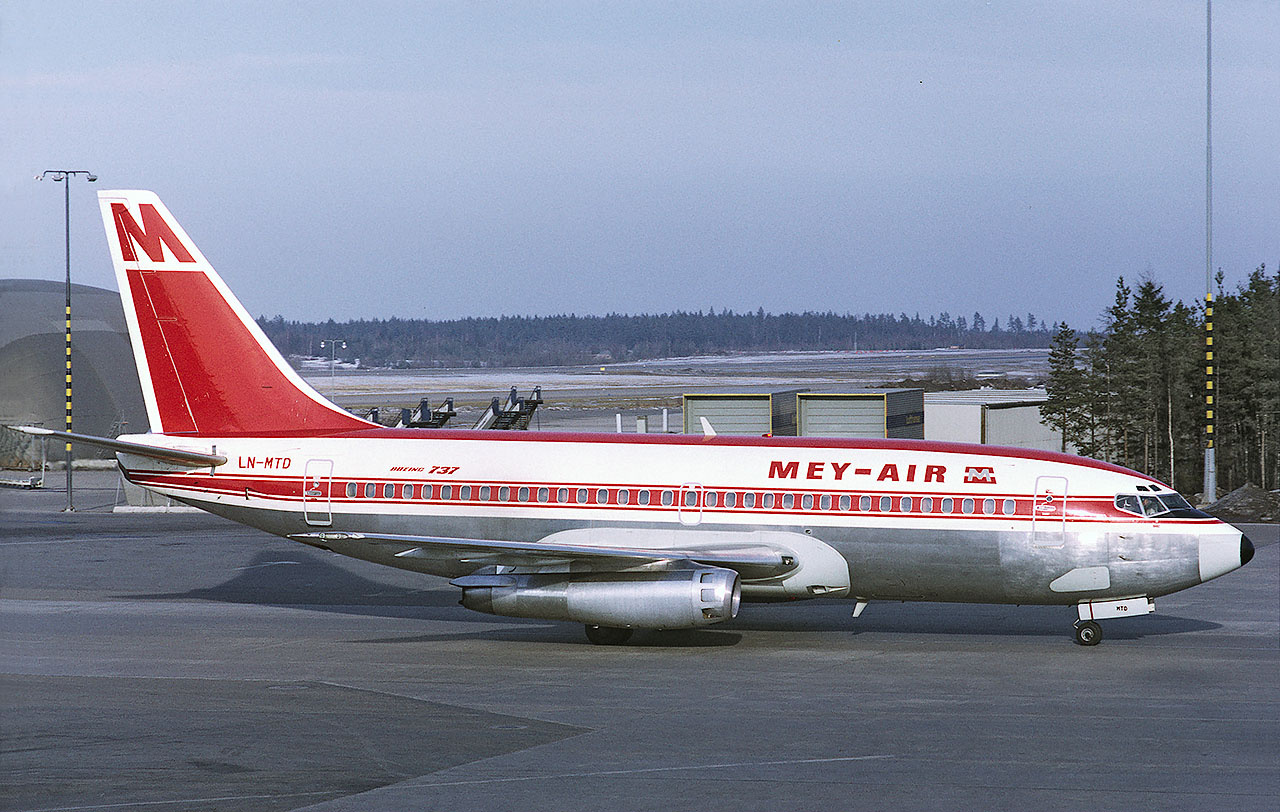
Boeing 737-200 of Mey-Air, prominently featured in the film

A passenger aeroplane arriving at the airport of Scandinavia's capital city is hijacked by another small group of terrorists, led by Ray Petrie. The aeroplane ends up parked on an isolated taxiway, and Petrie demands that he be put in touch with Martin Shepherd, leader of the group holding the British ambassador hostage. Petrie, who is known by Shepherd, convinces Shepherd that his group and his hostages should leave on the hijacked airplane, not on a military plane as originally planned.

Tahlvik and his group of military commandos make several attempts to thwart the terrorists' plans, but nothing seems to work out for them. At the last minute, Tahlvik figures out that the "terrorists" on the airplane are actually British secret operatives intent on capturing Martin Shepherd, and that the British officials have been misleading the Scandinavian authorities and undermining Tahlvik's efforts to capture the two terrorist groups. He boards the aeroplane alone just before it is to take off, precipitating a shootout between the two groups that leaves both Shepherd and Petrie dead.

== Cast ==
- Sean Connery as Col. Nils Tahlvik
- Ian McShane as Ray Petrie
- Jeffry Wickham as Capt. Frank Barnes
- Isabel Dean as Mrs. Palmer
- John Quentin as Martin Shepherd (dubbed by Robert Lang)
- Robert Harris as Ambassador Palmer
- James Maxwell as Bernhard
- William Fox as Ferris
- Harry Landis as Lookout Pilot - George Rawlings
- Norman Bristow as Capt. Denver
- John Cording as Bert
- Christopher Ellison as Pete
- Richard Hampton as Joe
- Preston Lockwood as Brigadier Hislop
- Karen Maxwell as Eva
- Gordon Honeycombe as the newsreader (uncredited)

== Production ==
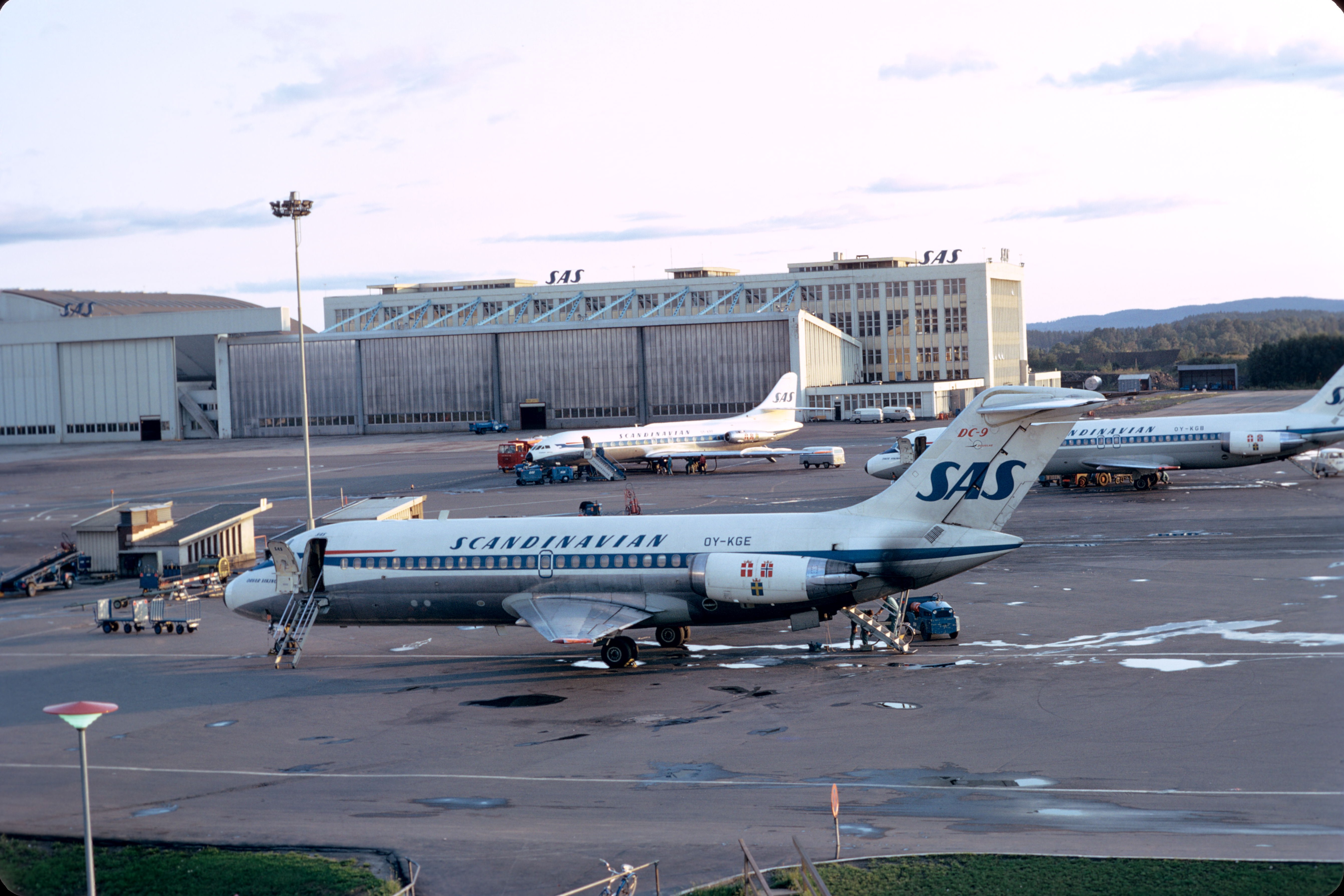
Large portions of the film were shot at Oslo Airport, Fornebu, here depicted in 1972.

Paul Wheeler said he was paid £7,000 to write the script and novelisation of the script. He said the script was originally set in Jordan but relocated to Norway when British Lion did a deal with Norsk Films.

According to Michael Deeley, managing director of British Lion Films, the film was put together by British producer Peter Rawley. He arranged the script and engaged Sean Connery and Ian MacShane, then went to British Lion, who agreed to provide the $1.5 million budget. They sold US and Canadian rights to 20th Century Fox for $800,000, and sold the rights for the rest of the world for $1 million, making a comfortable profit.

=== Filming ===
Filming was carried out in Norway, with a large part of the filming taking place at Oslo Airport, Fornebu. Technical services were contracted to Norsk Film. The aircraft displayed in the hijacking is a Boeing 737-200 in the livery of Mey-Air.

Production started in January 1974. During production, Mey-Air defaulted on their payments to Boeing Commercial Aircraft, who sent representatives to Fornebu to repossess the aircraft on 26 February. Filming of the aircraft shots had begun but were not completed.

== Reception ==
On Rotten Tomatoes the film has an approval rating of 50% based on reviews from 6 critics.

Time Out magazine commented:

The action is set in Scandinavia, and concerns two terrorist actions: the kidnap of the British ambassador at his residence; and the hijack of a passenger plane on the tarmac of a nearby airport. Law and order security chief Colonel Tahlvik (Connery) is given the task of handling the situations - only to discover that all is not what it seems.

Although Wrede and his photographer Sven Nykvist are more than competent, the movie nevertheless has a distinct air of triviality, due mainly to the made-for-TV ethos that seems to surround the whole production.

== Home media releases ==
In 2003, the film made its region 1 DVD debut from 20th Century Fox Home Entertainment on a dual-sided disc with an anamorphic 1.66 widescreen version on side A, and a 1.33:1 full frame version on side B. This release sports the original English mono and is the US version with "The Terrorists" title and opens with the Fox logo. In Europe, the first region 2 DVD release was by Scanbox Entertainment in Scandinavia using a 1.33 transfer, followed by a German DVD release by StudioCanal in 1.66:1 anamorphic widescreen; both carry the UK "Ransom" title.

In 2012, Anchor Bay (under licence from 20th Century Fox) reissued it on DVD and gave it a Blu-Ray debut in the US. This release is the same transfer of "The Terrorists" US version as the 2003 Fox DVD, only with a 5.1 upmix in lieu of the original Mono and no other supplements. This release is now Out of Print.

In the UK, it received its DVD and Blu-ray debut by independent label Network (under licence from StudioCanal, owners of the British Lion/EMI catalog) in August 2014. Network's release uses a new 2K restoration of the UK "Ransom" version and opens with the British Lion logo. Its supplements are UK Teaser and Theatrical trailers under its "Ransom" title.

In Australia, Umbrella Entertainment (under licence from StudioCanal) initially released a DVD release under "The Terrorists" title using the same transfer as the Fox DVD. In 2024, they re-released the film on Blu-ray utilizing the 2K restoration of the UK "Ransom" version. Its supplements are an exclusive audio commentary with Lee Pfeiffer, editor of Cinema Retro Magazine, along with film historians Paul Scrabo and Tony Latino, "The Wilderness Period" a new interview with film critic Kim Newman, the alternate title sequence with the US "The Terrorists" title card, the original trailer and teaser plus a trailer reel of 1970s films starring Sean Connery.
