= Convair CV-240 family =

Twin-engine short range airliner

CV-240 family
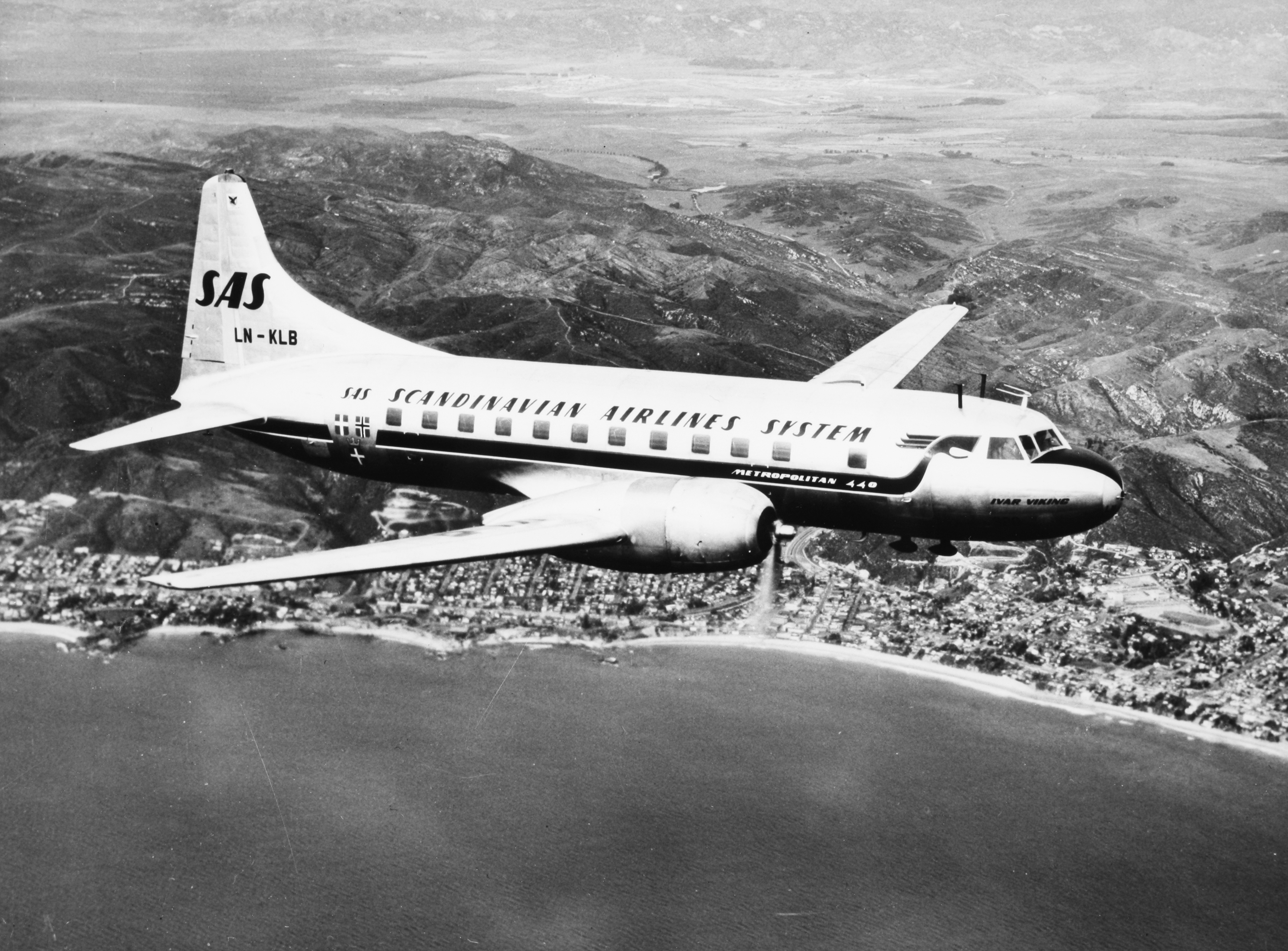
- A Scandinavian Airlines System Convair CV-440 in flight. The CV-440 is a low-wing airliner with twin radial engines

General information
- Type: Airliner
- Manufacturer: Convair
- Status: In limited service
- Primary users: American Airlines (historical) Zantop International Airlines (historical), Air Chathams (historical)
- Number built: 1,076 (Convair) 10 (Canadair) 1,086 (total)

History
- Manufactured: 1947–1954
- Introduction date: February 29, 1948 with American Airlines
- First flight: March 16, 1947
- Variants: Convair C-131 Samaritan; Canadair CC-109 Cosmopolitan

The Convair CV-240 is an airliner designed and manufactured by the American aerospace company Convair. The 240 portion of its designation referred to the aircraft's twin engines and its capacity to carry up to 40 passengers.

It originated as the Model 110 during the mid-1940s in response to a American Airlines requirement for an airliner to replace its ubiquitous Douglas DC-3. After being passed over for lacking cabin pressurization and insufficient size, Convair refined the aircraft into the Model 240. Performing its maiden flight on March 16, 1947, the type entered service with American, its launch customer, on February 29, 1948, becoming the first pressurized twin-engined airliner to enter service. The CV-240 family saw service with multiple airlines around the world as a commercial airliner, for which nearly a dozen civil-oriented variants were produced.

Further development of the type took place across that late 1940s and into the 1950s, leading to the Model 340 and Model 440 Metropolitan amongst others. Several models, such as the Convair C-131 Samaritan and the Canadair CC-109 Cosmopolitan, were produced for military purposes, including medical evacuation, VIP transportation, and training. One atypical use of the type was as a airborne laboratory for the National Research Council of Canada. While the majority of aircraft were powered by piston engines, several later-built models were furnished with turboprop powerplants instead, conversion programmes for existing aircraft were also operated. While the CV-240 had been largely displaced and retired by the end of the Cold War, various forms of the "Convairliners" have continued to fly into the twenty-first century.

== Design and development ==
The Convair CV-240 with a requirement by American Airlines for an airliner to replace its Douglas DC-3s. Convair's original design, the unpressurized Model 110, was a twin-engined low-wing monoplane of all-metal construction that could accommodate up to 30 seats. It was powered by Pratt & Whitney R-2800 Double Wasp radial engines and provisioned with a tricycle landing gear as well as a ventral airstair for passenger boarding. The prototype Model 110, registration NX90653, made its maiden flight on July 8, 1946. By this time, American Airlines had changed the requirements to include pressurization, it had also deemed the Model 110 to be too small. Subsequently, before the prototype was ultimately broken up in 1947, Convair flew the prototype for a time in support of the development of a revised design - the Model 240.

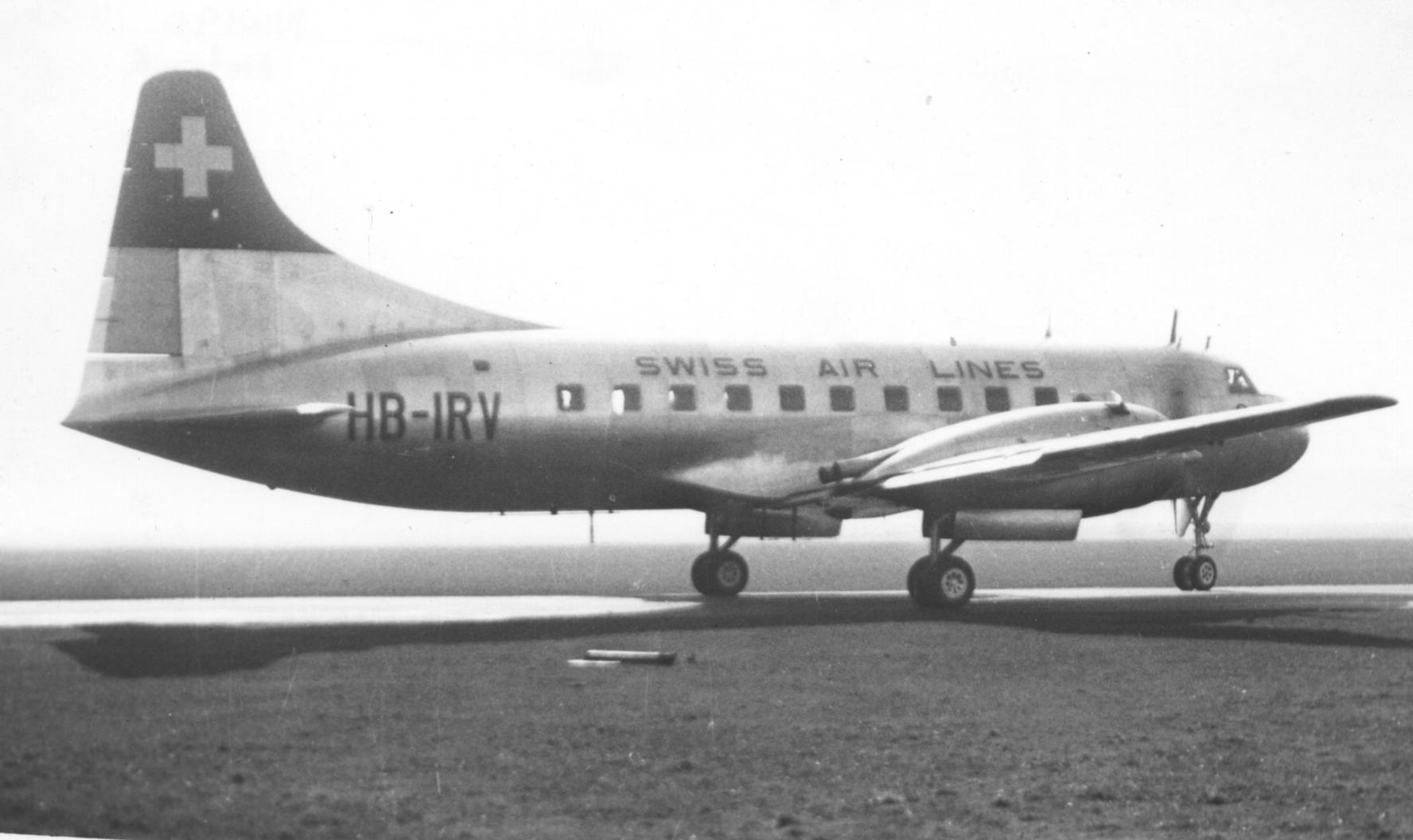
A 1949-built Convair 240 of Swissair at Manchester, England, in March 1950

To fulfil the expressed requirements for a pressurized airliner, Convair proceeded to develop the Model 240. This design revision featured a lengthened yet thinner fuselage than the Model 110, which could accommodate up to 40 passengers in a four-abreast arrangement of ten rows. The Model 240 first flew on March 16, 1947. Convair was able to secure American as the airliner's launch customer; the company placed an initial order for 100 Model 240s, although this was later reduced to 75 aircraft.

The Convair CV-240 is an all-metal airliner with a circular cross-section fuselage and a low-mounted monoplane wing. This wing featured a multi-spar structure and hydraulically-actuated Fowler flaps. Both the rudder and trailing edges of the elevator were composed of fiberglass. The aircraft's Pratt & Whitney Double Wasp engines, which could produce up to 2,400 horsepower (1,800 kW), were installed within a four-panel clamshell cowling which provided ample access for servicing and maintenance. The aircraft also featured an exhaust-augmented cooling system that was capable of providing additional thrust. The cockpit is compatible with two-pilot operation.

The Model 240 was soon followed by the Model 340; changes included a lengthened fuselage, longer-span wings, more powerful engines, and greater payload capacity. The Model 340 first flew on October 5, 1951. In 1954, in an attempt to compete with turboprop-powered airliners such as the Vickers Viscount, Convair produced the Model 440 Metropolitan, which was fitted with more streamlined cowlings, new engine exhausts, and improved soundproofing for the cabin. As the "Super 240" evolved into the CV-340 and CV-440, the design reached the limit of piston-engine performance, and future development centered on conversion to turboprop power. Convair ran conversion programmes for existing CV-340s and CV-440s to use turboprops, resulting in the CV-580.

== Operational history ==
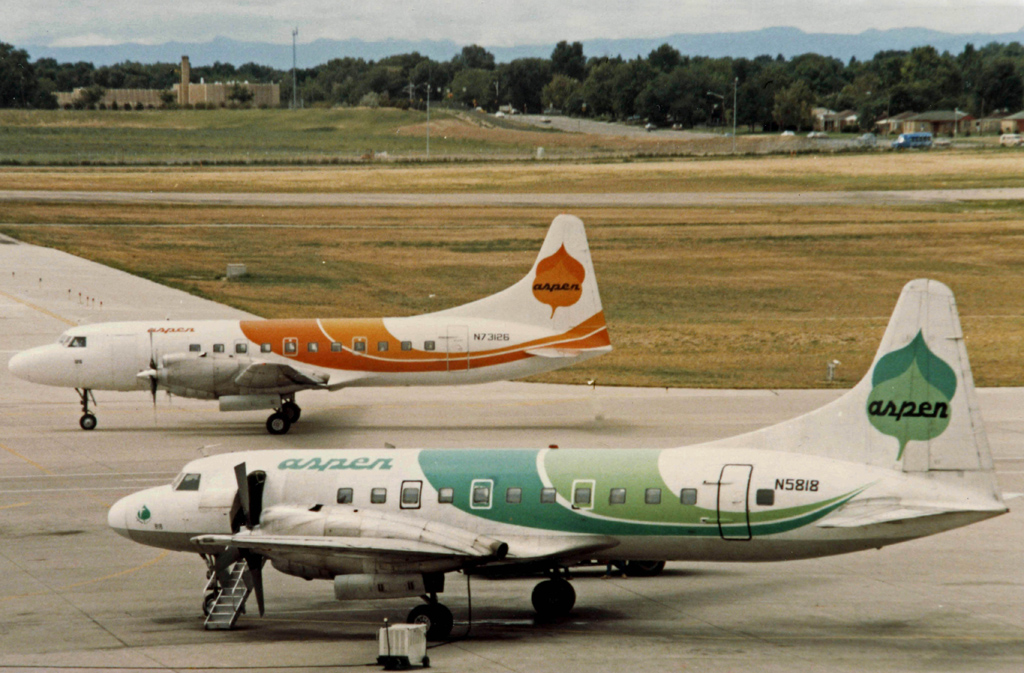
Two Convair 580s of the Aspen, Colorado-based Aspen Airways at Stapleton International Airport in Denver, US in 1986

Convair delivered the first production Convairliner to American Airlines on February 29, 1948. They delivered a total of 75 to American—and another 50 to Western Airlines, Continental Airlines, Pan American Airways, Lufthansa, KLM, Swissair, Sabena, and Trans Australia Airlines. A CV-240 was the first private aircraft used in a United States presidential campaign. In 1960, John F. Kennedy used a CV-240 named Caroline (after his daughter) during his campaign. This aircraft is now preserved in the National Air and Space Museum.

After aborted negotiations with TWA and Eastern for "Super 240" orders, Convair temporarily halted 240 series production. In response to a United inquiry, Convair redesigned the Super 240, calling it the CV-340. United ordered 55, and more US orders came from Braniff, Continental, Delta, Northeast, and National. Other orders came from abroad, and the CV-340 was popular in South America. The CV-340 earned a reputation for reliability and profitability, and was developed into the CV-440 Metropolitan, the final piston-engined variant of the Convairliners. Kelowna Flightcraft Air Charter, the major remaining operator of this model, currently holds the type certificate for this aircraft; it has been leasing the type out to cargo operators into the 2010s. The second hand price for a Convair 240 in 1960 was around £40,000.

== Variants ==
Data from: General Dynamics Aircraft and their predecessors

=== Civil variants ===
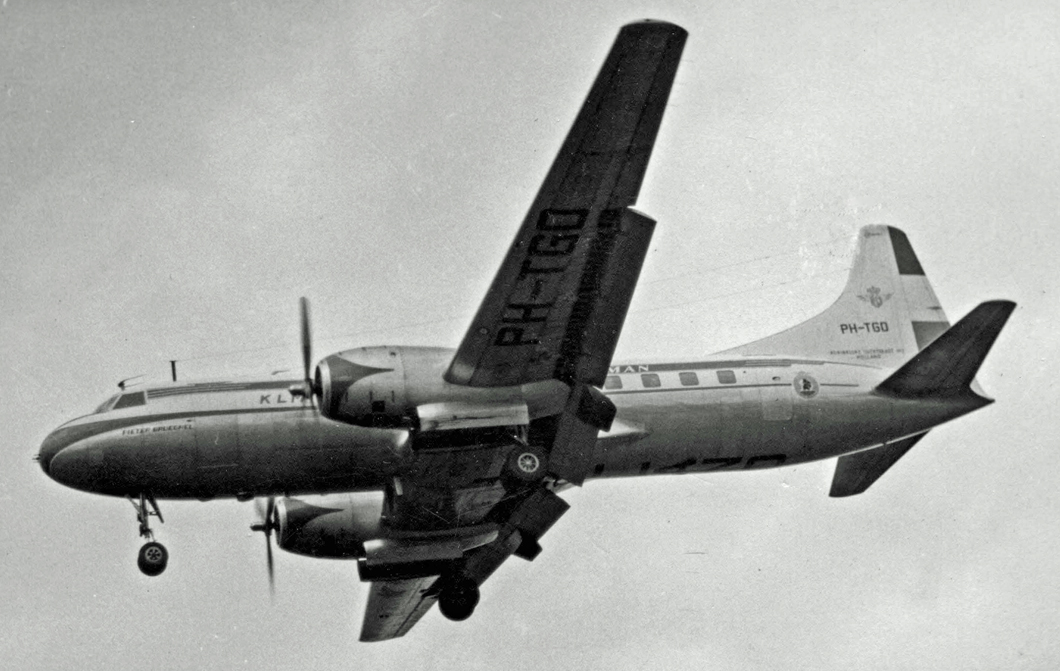
Convair 340 of KLM landing at Manchester Airport in 1954

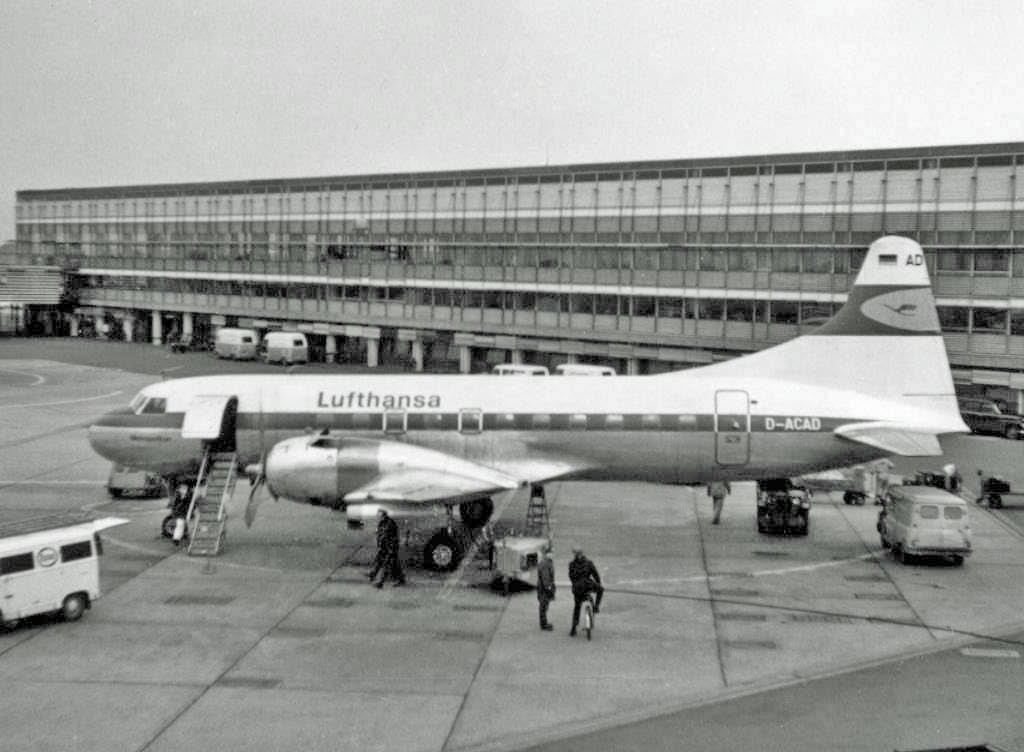
Convair 440 Metropolitan of Lufthansa at Copenhagen Airport in 1968

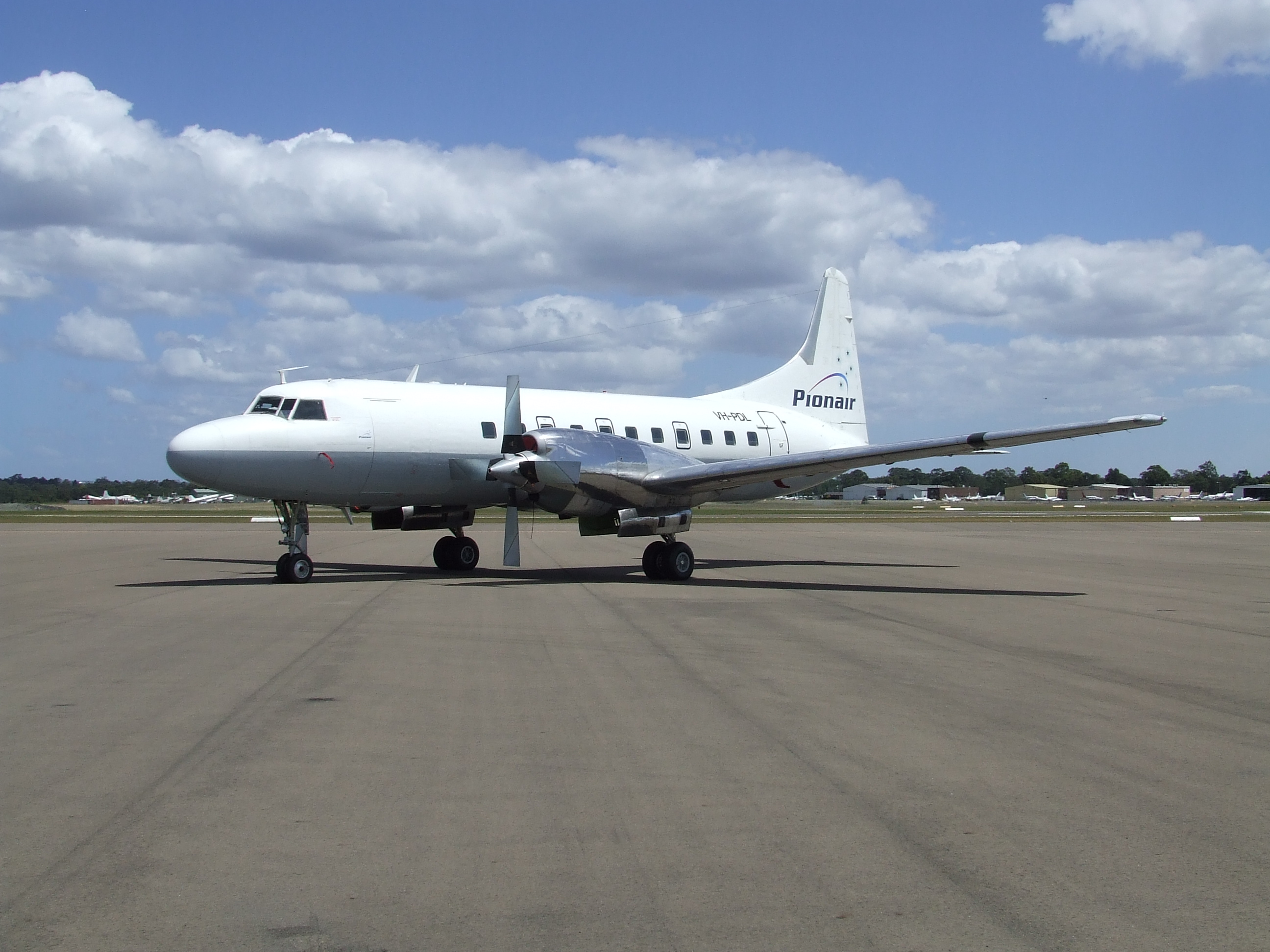
Convair 580 operated by the Australian arm of New Zealand airline Pionair. This example was converted from a CV-340

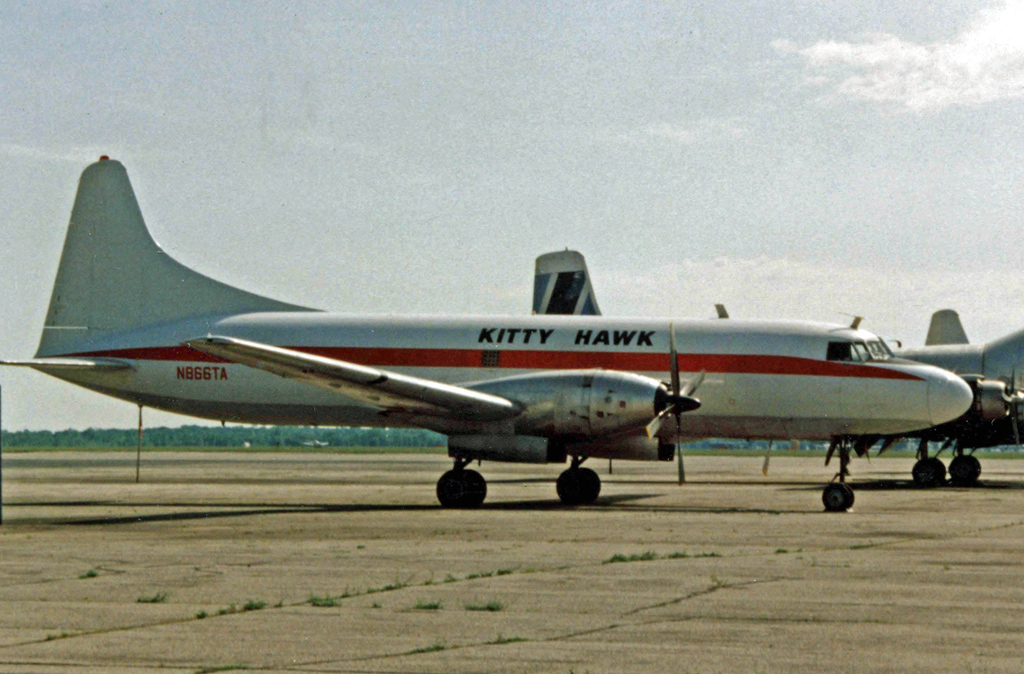
Convair 640F freighter of Kitty Hawk Aircargo converted with Rolls-Royce Dart turboprop engines

Convair Model 110
Unpressurized prototype with seats for 30 passengers. 89 ft (27.13 m) wingspan, 71 ft (21.64 m) length, powered by two 2,100 hp (1,567 kW) Pratt & Whitney R-2800-SC13G engines. One built.
Convair CV-240
Initial production version, with seats for 40 passengers in a pressurised fuselage. Powered by two Pratt & Whitney 2,400 hp (1,800 kW) R-2800 engines. 176 built (excluding military derivatives).

Convair CV-240-21 Turboliner

Turboprop-powered conversion fitted with Allison T38 engines. It became the first turboprop airliner to fly in the United States (on December 29, 1950), but problems with the engines resulted in development being terminated. Used as a test bed before being converted back to piston power.
Convair CV-300
A conversion from a Convair CV-240 with two R-2800 CB-17 engines and nacelles as used on the CV-340.
Convair CV-340
Built for United Airlines and other operators including KLM, the CV-340 was a CV-240 lengthened to hold an additional four seats. The wingspan was extended for better performance at higher altitudes. The CV-340 replaced the DC-3 in United service. The airline flew 52 340s for 16 years without a fatality. KLM operated the type from early 1953 until mid-1963. Many CV-340 aircraft were converted to CV-440 standard.
Convair CV-440 Metropolitan
CV-340 with improved soundproofing and an option for weather radar. Maximum weight rose to 49,700 lbs. An optional increase from 44 to 52 passengers was facilitated by the replacement of the carry-on luggage area with two more rows of seats, marked by the addition of an extra cabin window. This option was taken up by several airlines including Swissair, Lufthansa and SAS. Finnair operated the type from 1956 until 1980.

On March 13, 1957, Brooklyn Dodgers owner Walter O'Malley purchased a Convair 440 Metropolitan for $734,908.96 to travel the team during the 1957 season, and this plane was used as the team moved to Los Angeles for the 1958 season.
Convair CV-540
Conversion from a Convair CV-340 aircraft with two Napier Eland turboprop engines in place of the piston engines. Six aircraft were converted by Napier for Allegheny Airlines. Cost for the conversions was £160,000 per-aircraft. 12 built as new-builds by Canadair for the Royal Canadian Air Force (RCAF) as CC-109 in 1960 for £436,000 per aircraft. First flight February 9, 1955. When Rolls-Royce purchased Napier, the Eland program was terminated, and the Allegheny aircraft were converted back to piston power, but were later converted to Convair 580s with Allison turbo props.
Convair CV-580
Conversion from Convair CV-340 (Allison Prop-Jet Convair 340) or CV-440 aircraft with two Allison 501 D13D/H turboprop engines with four-blade propellers, in place of piston engines with three-blade propellers, an enlarged vertical fin and modified horizontal stabilizers. The conversions were performed by Pacific Airmotive on behalf of the Allison Engine Company. Cost of the conversions was around £175,000 per aircraft and took 60 days. The CV-580 served with the original Frontier Airlines (1950-1986), Allegheny Airlines, and North Central Airlines for many years and was also the first aircraft type operated by American Eagle on behalf of American Airlines in code sharing feeder service. General Motors Air Transport (GMATs) also used CV-580's on their internal air shuttle operation which ran between Detroit Metro Airport, Dayton, OH, Anderson, IN and other locations as needed.
Convair CV-580 Airtanker
Firefighting airtanker conversions with retardant tanks and dropping systems.
Convair CV-600
Conversion from a Convair 240 aircraft with Rolls-Royce Dart turboprop engines with four-blade propellers, in place of piston engines with three-blade propellers. CV-600 conversions were performed by Convair. The CV-600 first flew with Central Airlines on 30 November 1965 and also served with Trans-Texas Airways (TTa) and successor Texas International Airlines for many years. The CV-600 that flew with Air Metro Airways was configured as a 40-passenger airliner. In 2012, the last Convair CV-600 (Rhoades Aviation) went out of service.
Convair CV-640
Conversion from a Convair CV-340 or -440 with Rolls-Royce Dart turboprop engines with four-blade propellers, in place of piston engines with three-blade propellers. The conversions were performed by Convair. In 2012, a total of seven Convair CV-640 aircraft remained in airline service, with Rhoades Aviation (one) and C&M Airways (six).
Convair CV-5800

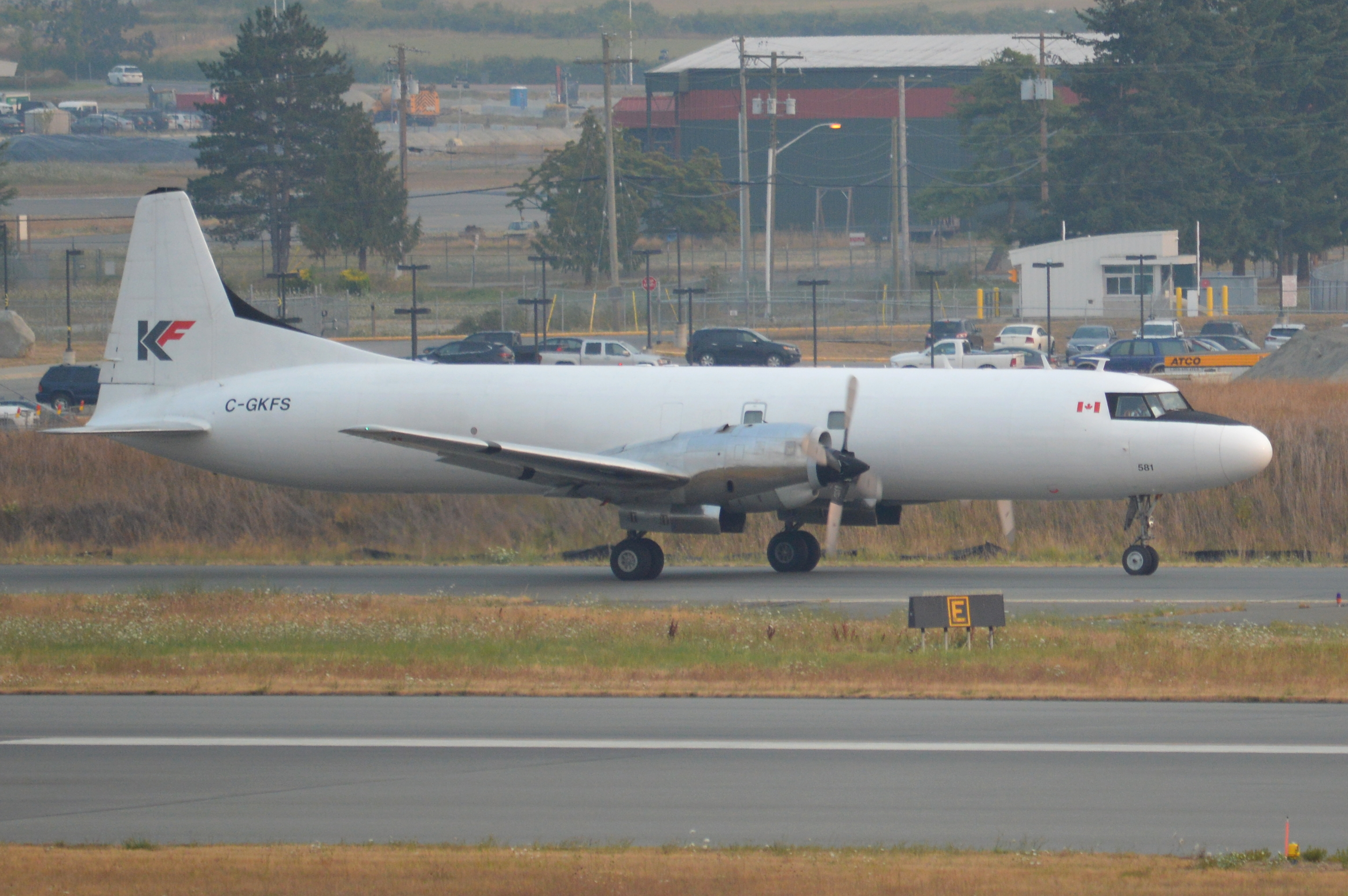
KF Cargo Convair CV-5800

A stretched Convair CV-5800 of IFL Group with this aircraft being developed by Kelowna Flightcraft (now KF Aerospace) in Canada.
Conversion from former US Navy C-131F Samaritans by Kelowna Flightcraft Ltd. (KF Aerospace since 2015) in Canada. The CV-5800 is a C-131F Samaritan stretched by 16 ft 7 in (4,98 m) with the Samaritan's original tail unit rather than the enlarged tail of the CV-580. These conversions also have a new freight door, digital avionics with EFIS and Allison 501-D22G engines in place of the original R-2800 engines. The prototype of this conversion first flew on February 11, 1992; the type certificate was issued on December 11, 1993. A total of six aircraft were converted (construction numbers 276 to 279, 309, 343) and mostly used by Contract Air Cargo (later IFL Group); one aircraft later operated by Air Freight NZ was then returned to KF Aerospace for operation in their own fleet.
Allison Turbine ATF 580S Turbo Flagship
Stretched Convairliner conversion.

=== Military variants ===
Convair C-131 Samaritan
The CV-240/340/440 series was used by the United States Air Force for medical evacuation and VIP under this designation
Convair T-29 trainer
A trainer model of the C-131 was used to instruct navigators and radio operators
Convair R4Y Samaritan
The United States Navy used the Samaritan under this designation
Canadair CC-109 Cosmopolitan
Conversion from CV-440, with Napier Eland turboprops in place of the piston engines. The conversions were performed in Canada by Canadair. In Royal Canadian Air Force and later in Canadian Armed Forces service they were known as the CC-109 Cosmopolitan. All were re-engined in 1966 with Allison 501-D13 engines.
Canadair CL-66
Company designation for the CC-109 Eland powered variant

== Operators ==
=== Civil operators ===
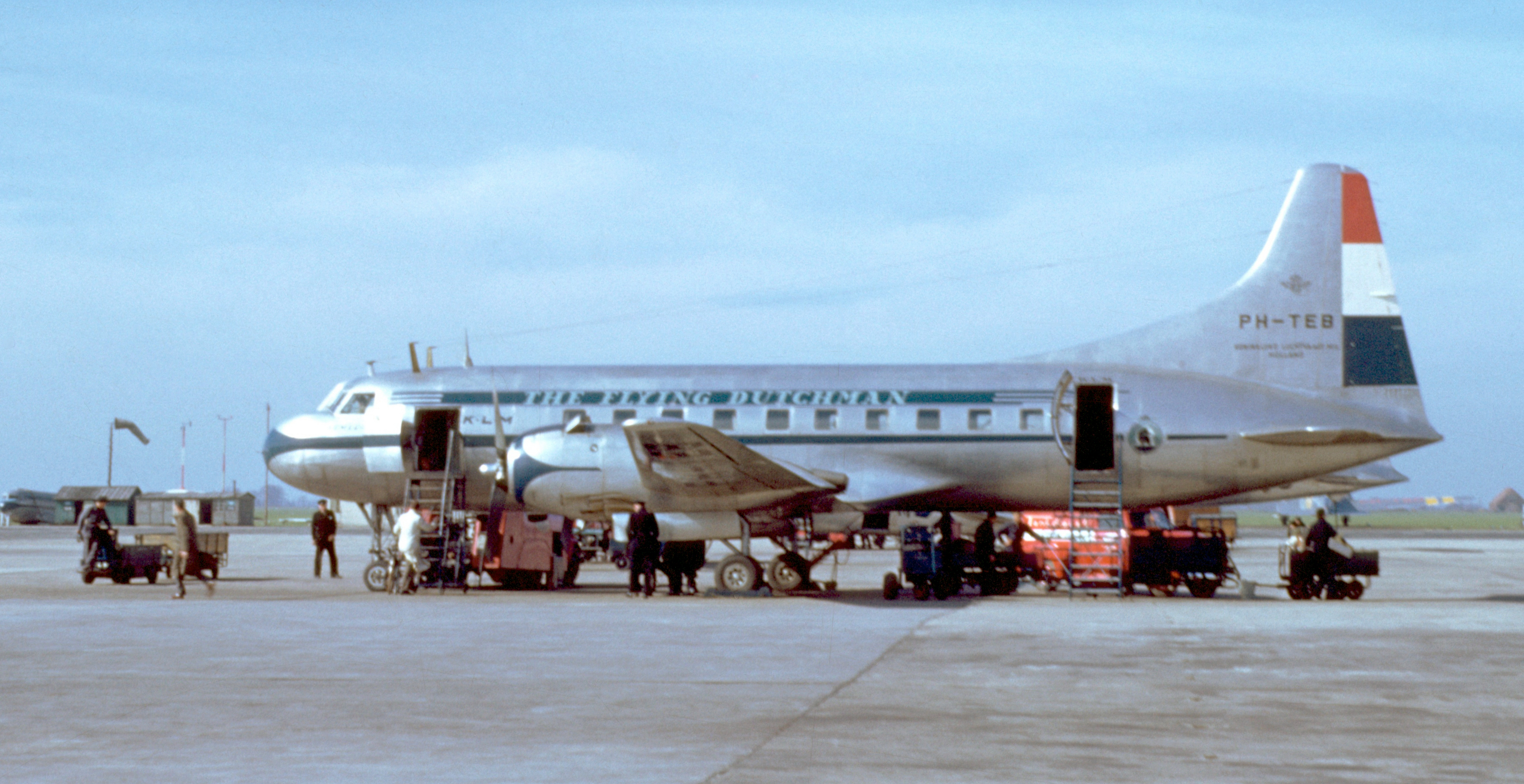
KLM Convair CV-240

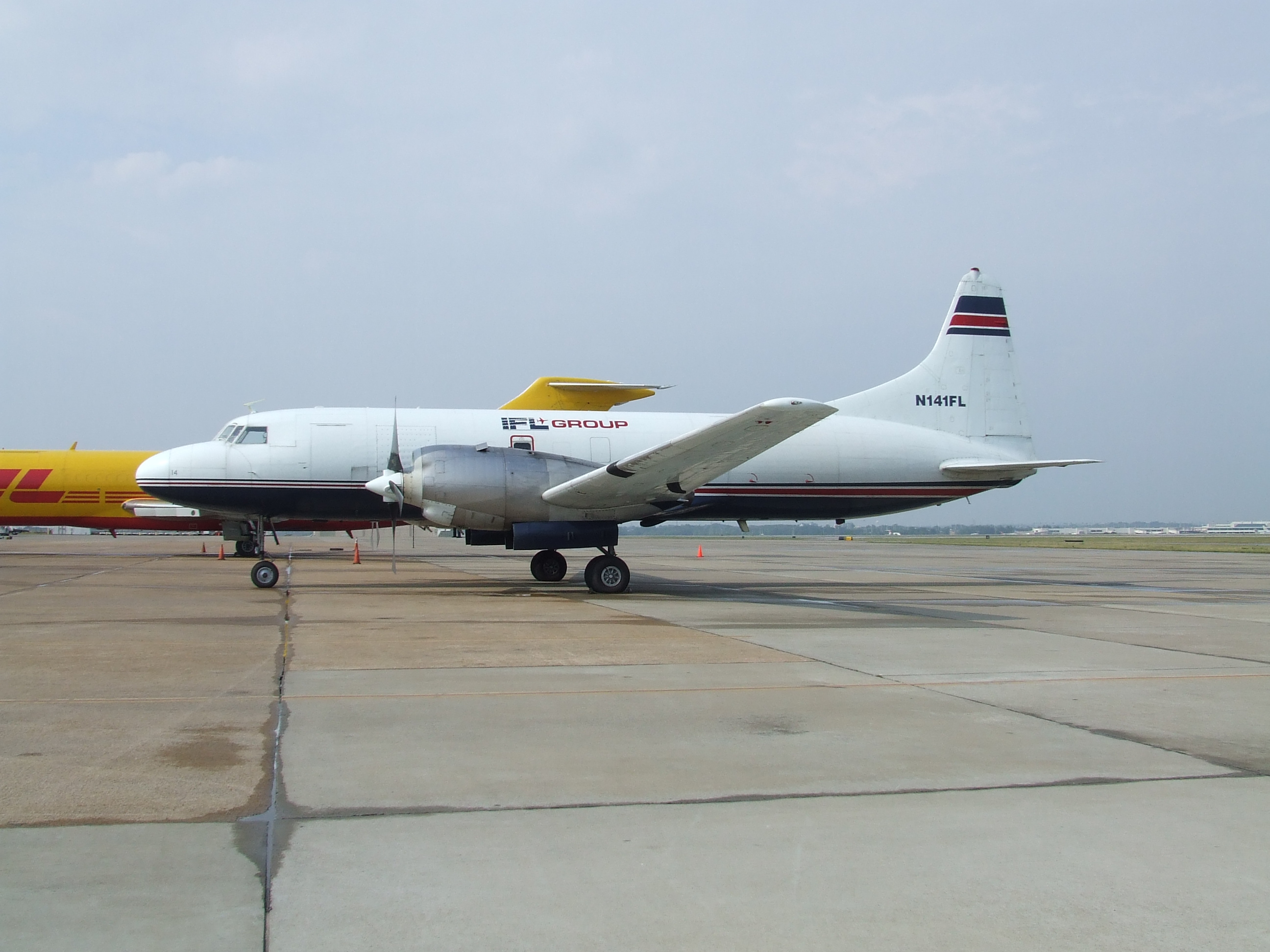
A Convair 580 freighter operated by the IFL Group with this aircraft being developed by Kelowna Flightcraft (now KF Aerospace) in Canada

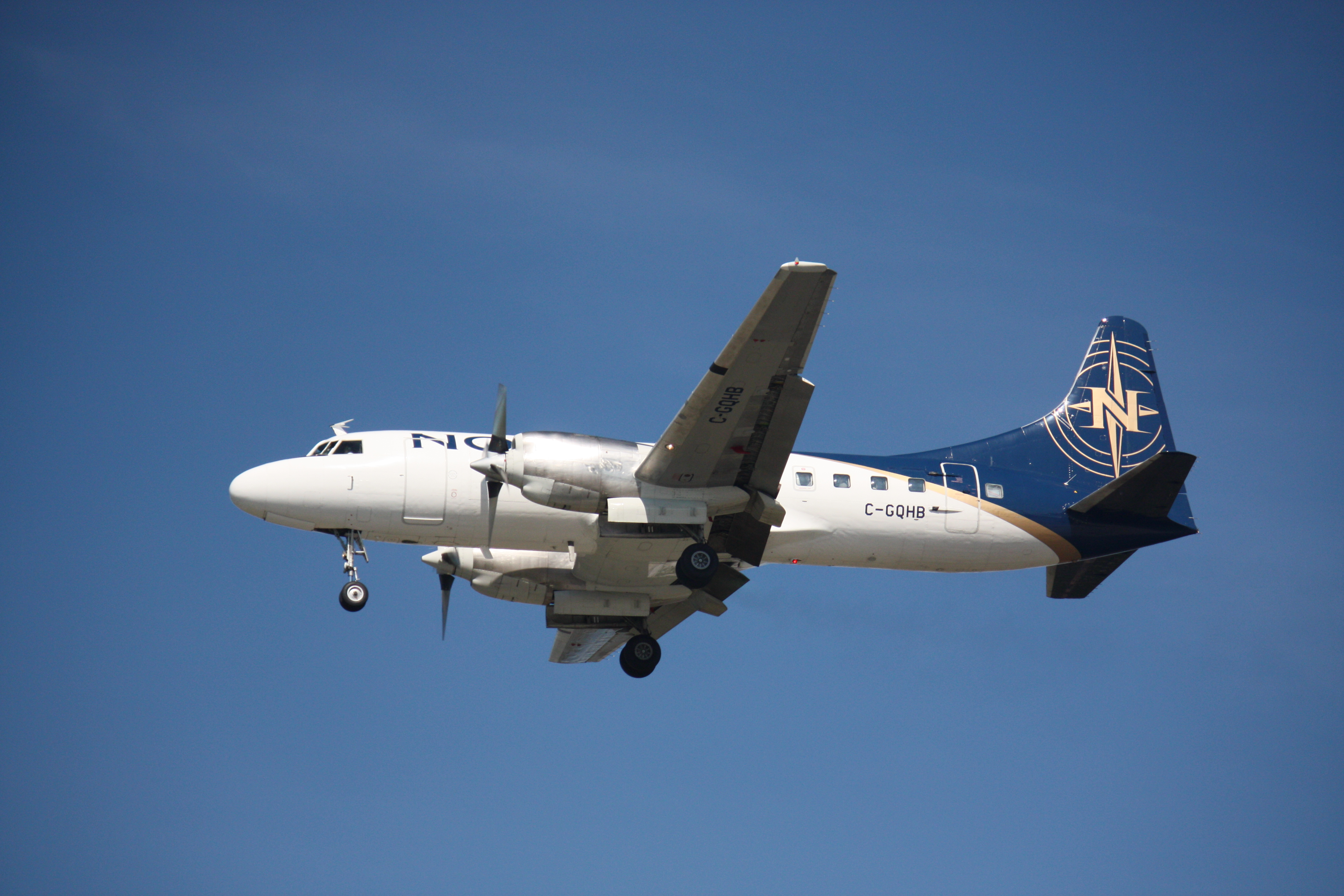
A Nolinor Convair 580 landing at Vancouver International Airport

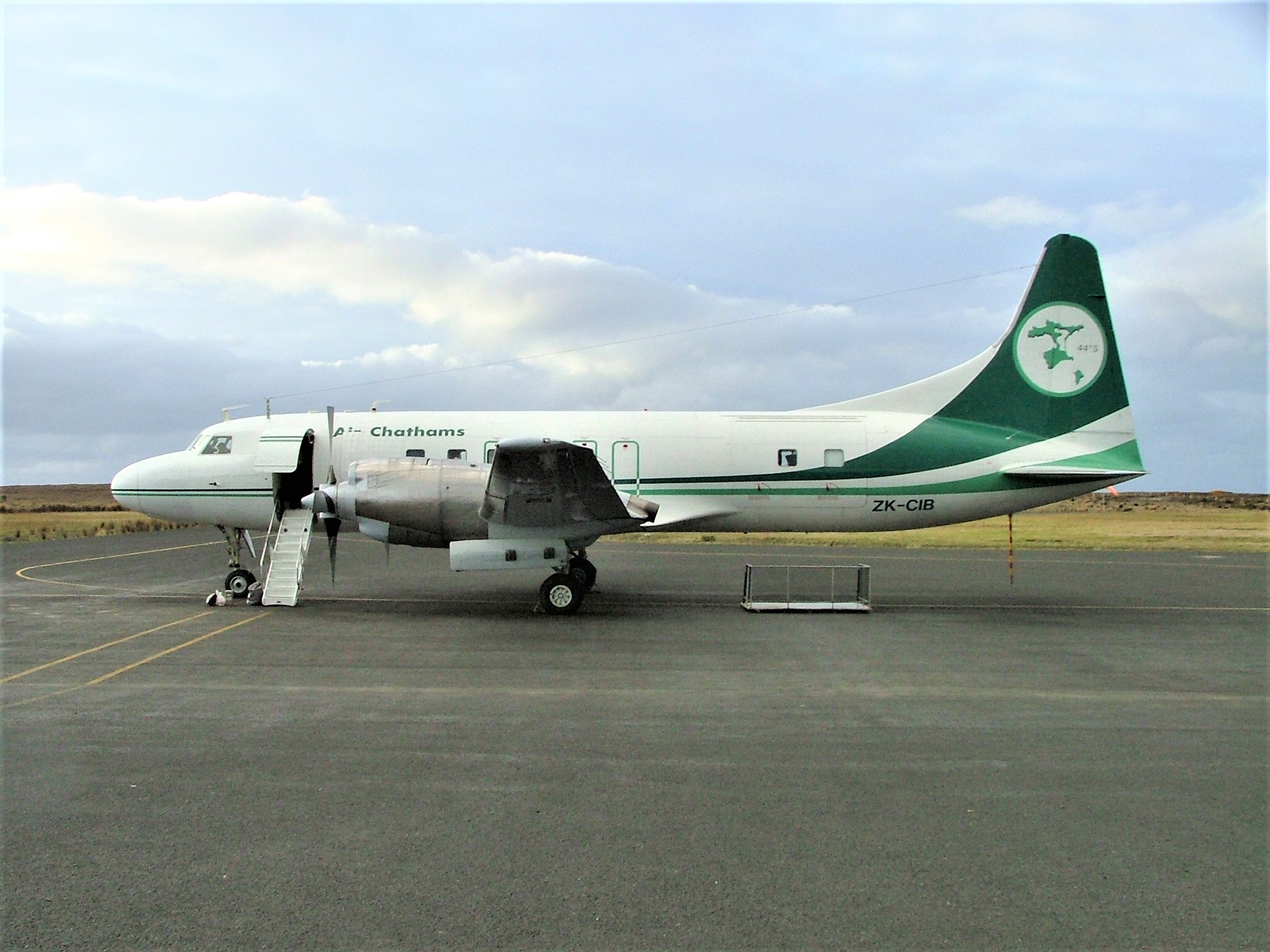
An Air Chathams Convair 580 at Tuuta Airport, Chatham Islands, New Zealand, in September 2003

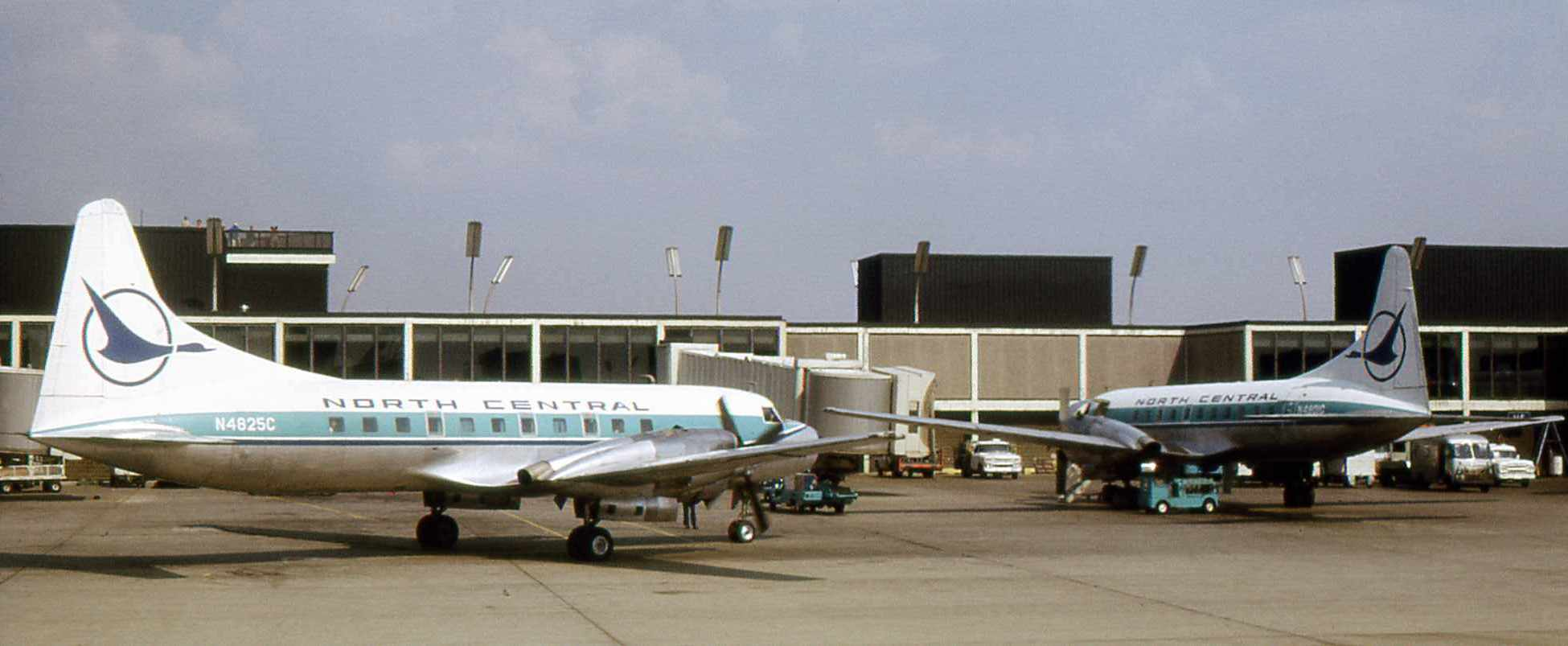
Two North Central CV-580 at O'Hare Airport, Chicago, in 1973

==== Africa ====
- Air Algerie – CV-640
- Ethiopian Air Lines – CV-240
- Kardair (Libya) – CV-440
- Titan Helicopter Group (South Africa) – 3 CV-580
- Regional Air (South Africa – 2 CV-580)
- Rovos Air (South Africa – CV-340)

==== Asia ====
- Air Jordan – CV-240
- Air Maldives – CV-440
- All Nippon Airways – CV-440
- Ariana Afghan Airlines – CV-340
- Central Air Transport Corporation (CATC), - 6 CV-240
- Garuda Indonesia – CV-240, CV-340 & CV-440
- Iran Air – CV-240
- Japan Domestic Airlines – CV-240
- Orient Airways CV-240
- Pakistan International Airlines – CV-240
- Philippine Airlines – CV-340
- Royal Air Cambodge – CV-440
- Saudia – CV-340
- Seulawah Air Services – CV-640
- South East Asia Air Transport – CV-340
- Toa Airways

==== Oceania ====
- Air Chathams – CV-580
- Air Fiji – CV-580
- Air Freight NZ – CV-580 & CV-5800
- Airlines of New South Wales – CV-440
- Airlines of South Australia – CV-440
- Ansett Airlines – CV-340, CV-440 (some were formerly operated by Braniff International Airways)
- Chathams Pacific – CV-580
- Pionair – CV-580
- Real Tonga – CV-580
- Trans Australia Airlines – CV-240

==== Europe ====
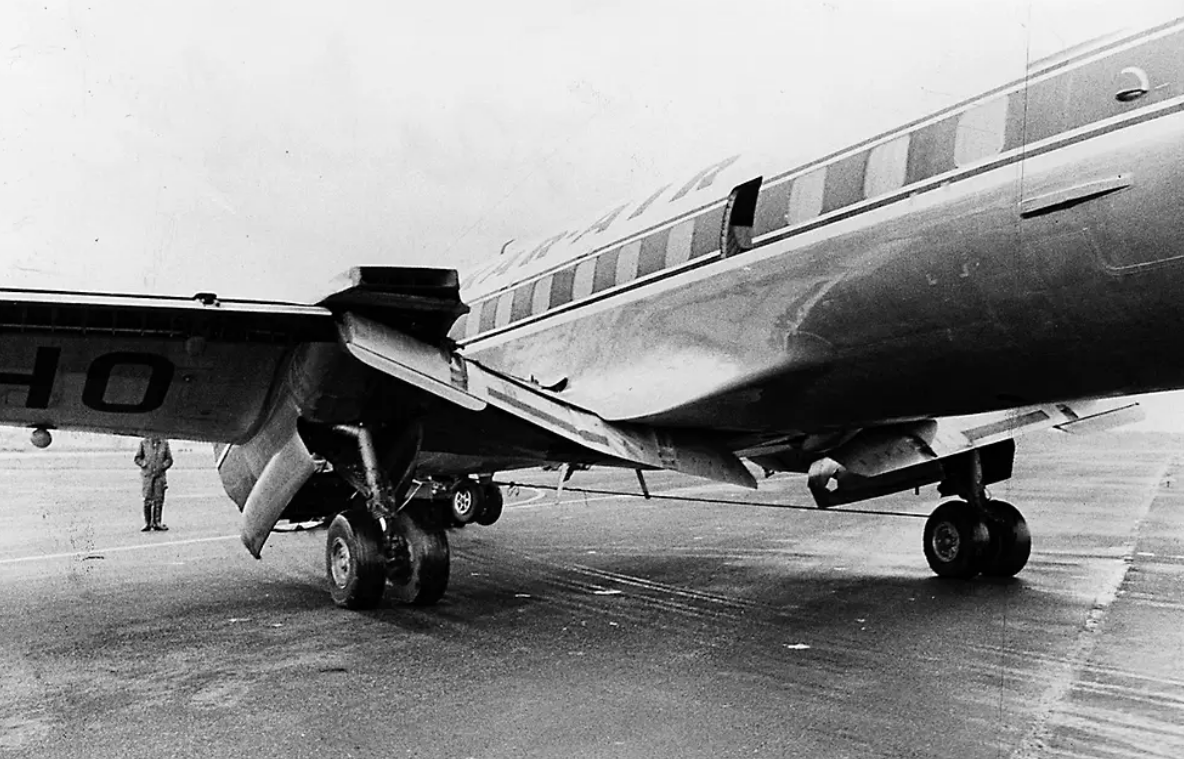
A Karair Convair Metropolitan (OH-VKN) after a mishap in landing in 1963, at the Helsinki-Vantaa airport

- Aviaco – CV-440
- Alitalia – Linee Aeree Italiane – CV-240, CV-340 & CV-440
- Condor (& predecessor Deutsche Flugdienst) – CV-240 & CV-440
- Delta Air Transport – CV-440
- European Air Transport – CV-580
- Finnair – CV-340 & CV-440
- Fred Olsen Air Transport – CV-340
- General Air (Germany) – CV-440
- Iberia Airlines – Convair CV-440
- JAT Yugoslav Airlines – CV-340 & CV-440
- Kar-Air CV-440
- KLM – CV-240 & CV-340
- Linjeflyg – CV-340 & CV-440
- LOT Polish Airlines – CV-240 (5 in 1957–1966)
- Lufthansa – CV-340 & CV-440
- Martinair – CV-640
- Mey-Air – CV-240
- Norsk Metropolitan Klubb – CV-440
- Nor-Fly Charter – CV-440 & CV-580
- Pan Adria Airways CV-440
- Partnair – CV-580
- Polaris Air Transport – CV-240
- SABENA – CV-240 & CV-440
- SAS – CV-440
- SATA, SA de Transport Aérien – CV-440 & CV-640
- Stellar Airfreighter (Norway) – CV-440
- Swiftair – CV-580
- Swissair – CV-240 & CV-440
- Tellair – CV-440

==== United States and Canada ====
- Air Mid-America – CV-600
- Air New England – CV-580
- Air Ontario – CV-580, CV-640
- Air Rajneesh – CV-240
- Air Resorts – CV-440
- Air Tahoma – CV-240 & CV-580
- Allegheny Airlines - CV-340, CV-440, CV-540 & CV-580
- Alaska Airlines – CV-240
- American Airlines – CV-240
- American Eagle – See Metro Airlines
- American Inter-Island – CV-440 (wholly owned subsidiary of American Airlines, which operated flights between San Juan, St. Thomas and St. Croix in the Caribbean)
- Aspen Airways – CV-240, CV-440 & CV-580
- Atlantic Gulf Airlines – CV-580
- Bar Harbor Airlines – CV-600
- Braniff International Airways – CV-340 & CV-440
- Buffalo Airways – CV-240 bought for its engines, not put in service
- Cal Sierra Airlines – CV-580
- Canadian Pacific Airlines – CV-240
- Caribair (Puerto Rico) – CV-340, CV-440 & CV-640
- Central Airlines – CV-240 & CV-600
- Charter Airlines – CV-580
- Cochise Airlines – CV-440
- Conair Group – CV-580
- Continental Airlines – CV-240, CV-340 & CV-440
- Continental Express – CV-580 (operated by Trans-Colorado Airlines)
- Cordova Airlines – CV-240 (acquired by and merged into Alaska Airlines)
- Delta Air Lines – CV-340 & CV-440
- Desert Air – CV-240
- Eastern Air Lines – CV-440
- Era Aviation – CV-580
- Executive Airlines – CV-440
- Freedom Airlines – CV-580
- Frontier Airlines (1950–1986) – CV-240, CV-340, CV-440, CV-580 & CV-600 (CV-600 aircraft formerly operated by Central Airlines)
- General Aviation - CV240, CV-340 and CV-440
- Great Lakes Airlines (Canada) – CV-440 & CV-580
- Gulf Air Transport – CV-340, CV-440 & CV-580 (U.S. charter air carrier. CV-580s were formerly operated by North Central and Republic.)
- Harrison Airways (Canada) – CV-440
- Hawaiian Airlines – CV-340, CV-440 & CV-640
- IFL Group – CV-580 & CV-5800
- Interstate Airlines - CV-580
- Kelowna Flightcraft Air Charter (KF Aerospace) – CV-580 & CV-5800
- Kitty Hawk Aircargo – CV-240, CV-340, CV-440, CV-600 and CV-640
- Lake Central Airlines – CV-340 & CV-580
- Laredo Air – CV-580
- Mackey International – CV-440 & CV-580
- Metro Airlines (via its wholly owned Metroflight division) – CV-580 (former Frontier Airlines aircraft that were operated for American Eagle via agreement with American Airlines)
- Miami Air Lease – CV-440
- Midwest Air Charter/Airborne Express – CV-600
- Mohawk Airlines – CV-240 & CV-440
- National Airlines – CV-340 & CV-440
- Nolinor Aviation – CV-580
- Norcanair – CV-580 & CV-640
- Nordair (Nordair Metro division) – CV-580
- North Central Airlines – CV-580
- Northeast Airlines – CV-240
- Northwest Airlines – CV-580 (former Republic Airlines aircraft that were previously operated by North Central Airlines)
- Pacific Western Airlines – CV-640
- Pan American World Airways (Pan Am) – CV-240 & CV-340
- Powell Air – CV-440
- Quebecair – CV-540 (CL-66)
- Renown Aviation – CV-440 & CV-580
- Republic Airlines – CV-580 (formerly operated by North Central Airlines)
- Resort Air Commuter – CV-580
- Rhoades Aviation – CV-640
- Sea Airmotive – CV-340, CV-440 & CV-580
- Sierra Pacific Airlines – CV-340, CV-440 & CV-580
- Skyfreighters – CV-440
- SMB Stage Lines – CV-600 & CV-640
- Summit Airlines – CV-580
- Sun Valley Key Airlines – CV-440 (U.S. commuter air carrier previously known as Sun Valley Airlines, which operated out of Salt Lake City, UT and Sun Valley, ID, and then changed its name back to Key Airlines)
- Trans-Texas Airways (TTa) – CV-240 & CV-600
- Texas International Airlines – CV-600 (former Trans-Texas Airways aircraft)
- Time Air – CV-580 & CV-640 (former Norcan Air and North Caribou, also one previously owned by Domino's Pizza)
- Trans-Colorado Airlines – CV-580 (aircraft painted in the livery of Continental Express)
- United Airlines – CV-340 & CV-580 (CV-580 aircraft operated via wet lease contract by Frontier Airlines (1950–1986) as the replacement for former United Douglas DC-6 service to Elko, NV and Ely, NV)
- Viking International Airlines – CV-600 & CV-640
- Westates Airlines – CV-580
- Western Airlines – CV-240
- Wright Air Lines – CV-440, CV-600 & CV-640
- Zantop International Airlines – Convair 640

==== Mexico, the Caribbean, Central and South America ====
- Aero California – CV-340
- Aerocaribe – CV-340 & CV-440
- Aerolíneas Argentinas – CV-240
- Aerolineas Colonia (Uruguay) – CV-240
- Aeromexico – CV-340
- Aeroquetzal – CV-580
- ALM Antillean Airlines – CV-340 & CV-440
- Arawak Airlines (Trinidad and Tobago) CV-440
- ARCO Aerolíneas Colonia S.A. (Uruguay) – CV-240, CV-600
- Avensa – CV-240, CV-340, CV-580
- Aviateca – CV-240, CV-340 & CV-440
- Caribair (Puerto Rico) – see North America
- Chilean Airways – CV-580
- COPA Compañia Panameña de Aviación – CV-340
- Cruzeiro do Sul – CV-240, CV-340 & CV-440
- Flota Aérea Mercante Argentina (FAMA)
- LACSA – CV-340 & CV-440
- Líneas Aéreas Paraguayas (LAP) – three CV-240
- LAN Chile – CV-440
- Prinair – CV-580
- Real Transportes Aéreos – CV-340 & CV-440
- SAHSA – CV-580
- Transportes Aéreos Nacional – CV-440
- Varig – CV-240, CV-340 & CV-440

=== Military operators ===
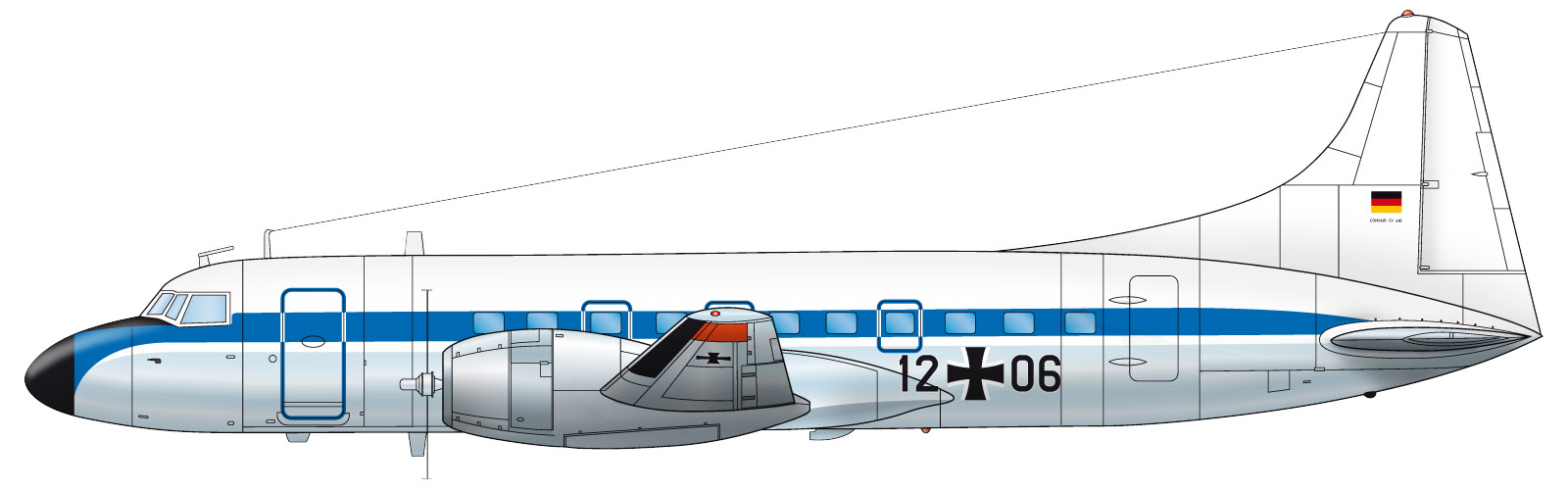
CV-440 operated by Luftwaffe

Australia

- Royal Australian Air Force - Two CV-440 Metropolitans (RAAF serial A95-313 and 353) were in service with RAAF from 1956 to 1968.
  - No. 34 Squadron RAAF

Bolivia

- Transporte Aéreo Militar - Six CV-440s and five CV-580s acquired. One of each remaining as of 1987.

Canada

- Royal Canadian Air Force and Canadian Armed Forces CV-540s were re-engined with T56 turbo props with 412 Squadron

Colombia
CV-580
Germany

- Luftwaffe operated six CV-440s.

Italy

- Italian Air Force operated four CV-440 Metropolitans from 1957 until 1978

Mexico

- Mexican Air Force CV-580 Nowadays used as an AEW&C Simulator on AFB #1 Santa Lucia

Paraguay

- Paraguayan Air Force: CV-440/C-131D

Sri Lanka

- Sri Lanka Air Force - CV-440

=== Other operators ===
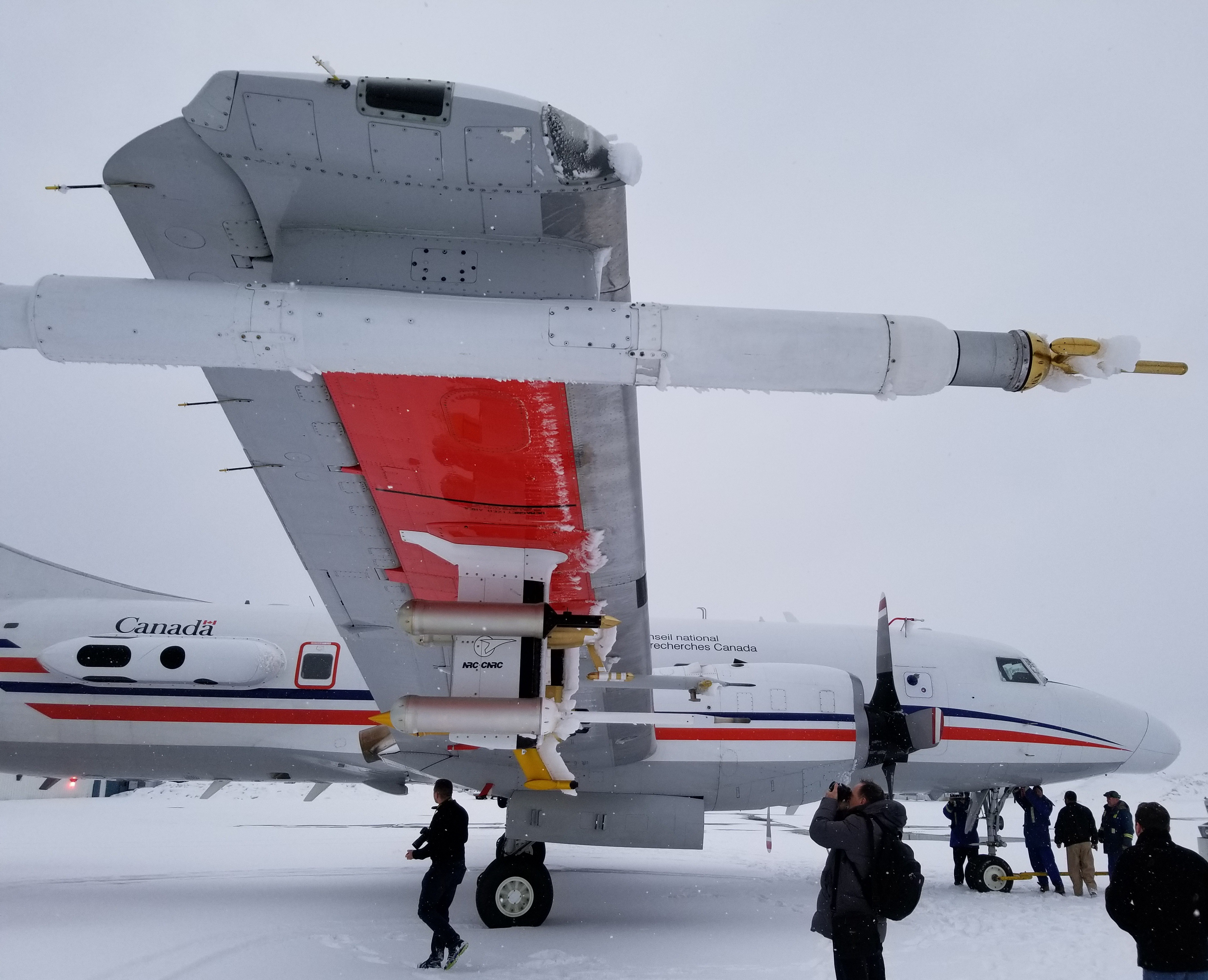
National Research Council of Canada Convair-580

Canada

- National Research Council (Canada) (CV-580 C-FNRC multi purpose flying laboratory, mainly used for airborne atmospheric research, carrying more than 40 in-situ sensors and cloud probes and remote sensing instrumentation such as X,W band radars, 355 nm lidars, and radiometers. )
- Canada Centre for Remote Sensing, later Environment Canada, retired to the Canada Aviation and Space Museum in June 2015 in recognition of its historical significance to Canadian science (CV-580 C-GRSC)

China

- CAAC - One CATC CV-240 defected to the People's Republic in November 1949. This may have been used as a VIP aircraft.

United States

- Airborne Imaging, (C-131B N131CR)
- Environmental Research Institute of Michigan, later Veridian and then General Dynamics Advanced Information Systems (CV-580s N51211) and N51255)
- Honeywell International, Everett Washington (CV-580 N580HW)
- Raytheon, Tucson Arizona (CV-580 N580HH)
- University of Washington, (CV-580 N3UW)

== Specifications (CV-240) ==
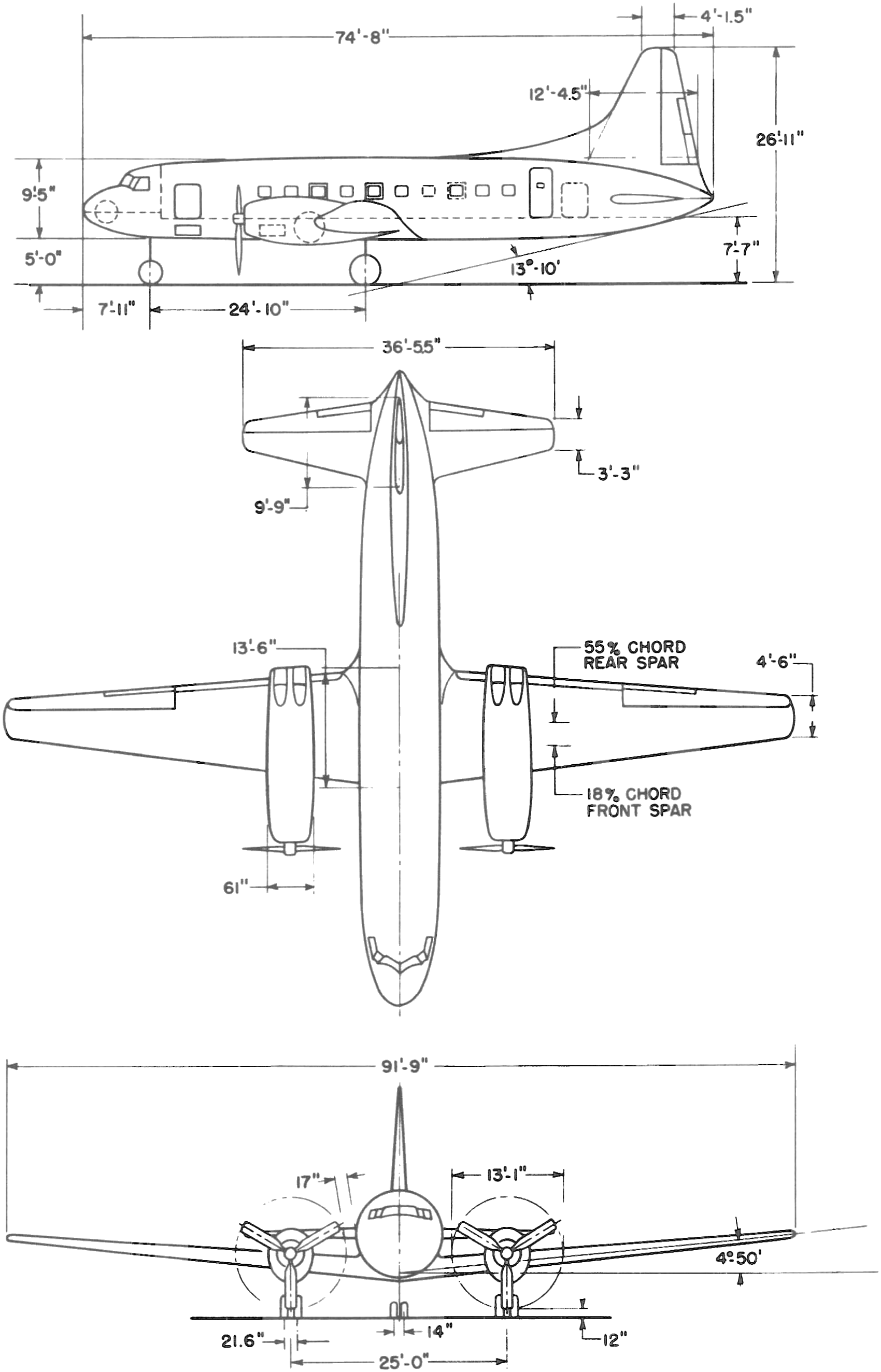
3-view line drawing of the Convair 240

Data from General Dynamics Aircraft and their Predecessors

General characteristics

- Crew: between two and three flight deck crew
- Capacity: 40
- Length: 74 ft 8 in (22.76 m)
- Wingspan: 91 ft 9 in (27.97 m)
- Height: 26 ft 11 in (8.20 m)
- Wing area: 817 sq ft (75.9 m^{2})
- Empty weight: 25,445 lb (11,542 kg) (revised 29,500 lb (13,381 kg))
- Gross weight: 40,500 lb (18,370 kg) (revised 42,500 lb (19,278 kg))
- Fuel capacity: 1,000 US gal (3,785.41 L; 832.67 imp gal) - 1,550 US gal (5,867.39 L; 1,290.64 imp gal)
- Powerplant: 2 × Pratt & Whitney R-2800-CA3 Double Wasp / CA15 / CA18 / CB3 or CB16 18-cylinder air-cooled radial engines, 2,400 hp (1,800 kW) each
- Propellers: 3-bladed Hamilton Standard or Curtiss reversible pitch

Performance

- Maximum speed: 315 mph (507 km/h, 274 kn)
- Cruise speed: 280 mph (450 km/h, 240 kn) (maximum)
- Range: 1,200 mi (1,900 km, 1,000 nmi)
- Service ceiling: 16,000 ft (4,900 m)
- Rate of climb: 1,520 ft/min (7.7 m/s)

== See also ==
Related development

- Convair C-131 Samaritan
- Canadair CC-109 Cosmopolitan

Aircraft of comparable role, configuration, and era

- Airspeed Ambassador
- HS 748
- Ilyushin Il-12
- Martin 2-0-2
- Martin 4-0-4
- Saab 90 Scandia
- Vickers VC.1 Viking
