= Malher =

Guatemalan foodstuffs company

Malher S.A.
- Type: Corporation
- Industry: Food Processing
- Founded: July 21, 1957
- Headquarters: Guatemala City, Guatemala
- Key people: Miguel Ángel Maldonado and María García de Maldonado; Founders
- Products: Food seasoning, Beverages, Canned Food, etc.
- Parent: Nestlé
- Website: The Malher website

Malher S.A. is a Guatemala City food products and beverages company; it offers a variety of products in all Central America and the Caribbean region. Malher's products include food seasoning, canned food, and fruit-flavored soft drinks. The name "Malher" comes from the words, "Maldonado Hermanos", which means Maldonado brothers. Miguel Ángel named it after his two brothers, Jorge Efrain and Max.

It was founded on July 21, 1957, by Miguel Ángel Maldonado, his brother Jorge Efrain, and his wife, María García de Maldonado, with the latter running the company after her husband's death in 1972, at the age of 46.

== See also ==
- List of companies of Guatemala
- List of Nestlé brands
