= HDG International Group =

American energy company

- Type: Private company
- Industry: Coal, oil, gas
- Headquarters: Charlotte, North Carolina
- Key people: Sergio Bardi, CEO

HDG International Group and its subsidiaries are leading coal, natural gas and oil producers with significant operations in the central Appalachian area of the United States. Their reserves consist of over four billion tons primarily consisting of high energy content, low sulfur steam coal that is currently in high demand in the United States and international coal markets.

The HDG International Group's global headquarters is in Charlotte, North Carolina.

HDG International Group produces, processes and sells steam and metallurgical coal from ten regional business units supported by active underground mines, seven active surface mines and four coal preparation plants located throughout Tennessee, West Virginia, Kentucky and Pennsylvania.

== General and cited references ==
- Annual Energy Review 2006, DOE/EIA-0384(2004), Energy Information Administration: Washington, DC, 2007; 206.
- McDaniel, J; Kitts, E. A. West Virginia Case Study. Electronic slide presentation In Mining and Reclamation Technology Symposium, Morgantown, WV,
- Longwall Mining, DOE/EIA-TR-0588), Energy Information Administration: Washington, DC, 1995; 34–35. Minerals Yearbook 1973, Coal—Bituminous and Lignite chapter, U.S. Department of the Interior, Bureau of Mines: Washington, DC; 353.
- Annual Coal Report, DOE/EIA-0584(2006), Energy Information Administration: Washington, DC; 22. Retrieved 23 October 2005.
