= Aviones Comerciales de Guatemala =

Guatemalan airline

- Founded: 1954
- Operating bases: La Aurora International Airport; Mundo Maya International Airport
- Headquarters: Guatemala City, Guatemala

Aviones Comerciales de Guatemala (Avcom) is a charter airline based in Guatemala City, Guatemala. It was established in 1954. It operates domestic charter services and was associated with Grupo TACA. Its main base is La Aurora International Airport.

== Fleet ==
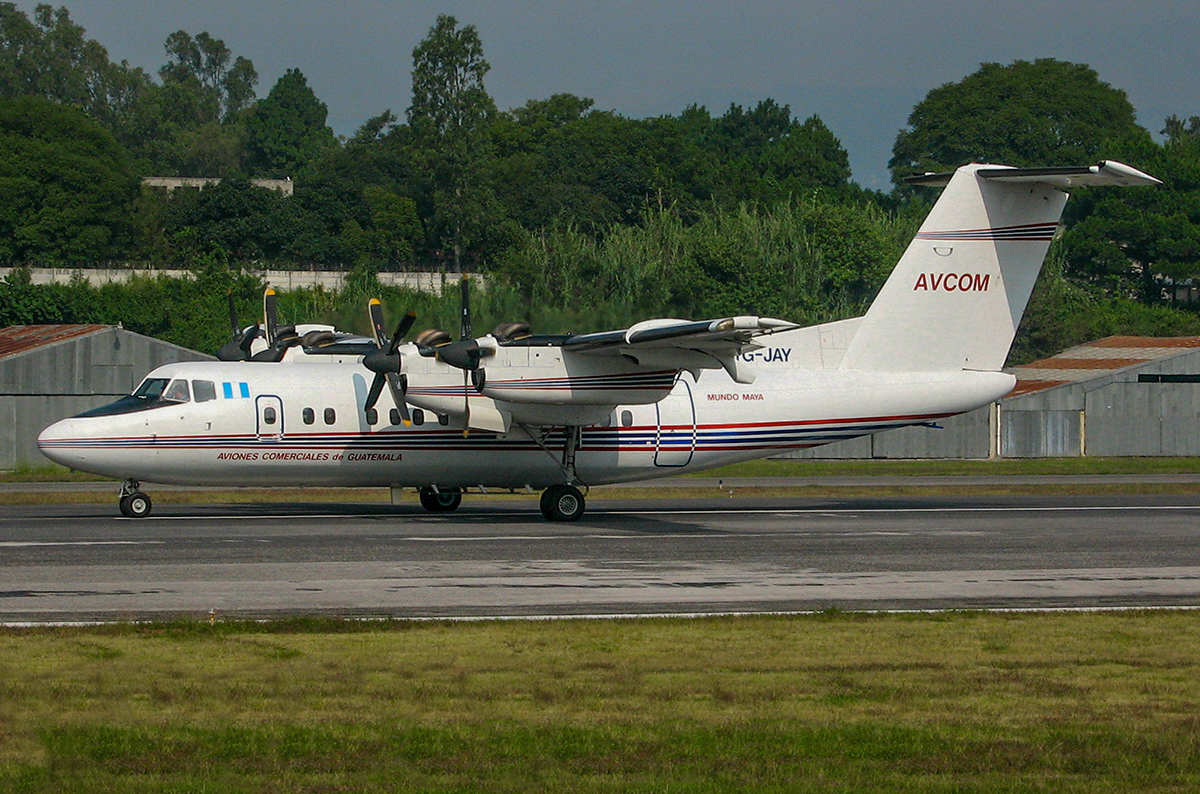
Avcom DHC-7 at La Aurora International Airport in 2012

The fleet of Avcom consisted of the following aircraft (as of March 2007):

- 5 DHC-6 Twin Otter Series 300
- 1 De Havilland Canada Dash 7
- 4 Aero Commander 500

== Accidents and incidents ==
On February 16, 1996, a DHC-6 Twin Otter Series 300 (registered TG-JAK), was on a ferry flight from Guatemala City to Cancábal crashed. On approach, the captain descended into the clouds below MDA. The aircraft contacted with trees and crashed, killing the 2 occupants on board.

== See also ==
- List of airlines of Guatemala
