= Trama Textiles =

TRAMA is a collective of 400 backstrap loom weavers, mainly women, in Guatemala. TRAMA works with 17 weaving cooperatives, representing five regions in the Western Highlands of Guatemala (Sololá, Huehuetenango, Sacatepéquez, Quetzaltenango and Quiché).

== History ==
In 1988, after Guatemala's civil war, the association was formed to support women working in remote regions. Trama Textiles works directly with 17 weaving cooperatives, representing 400 women from five regions in the western highlands of Guatemala: Sololá, Huehuetenango, Sacatepéquez, Quetzaltenango and Quiché. Initially named CENAT (Centro Nacional de Artesania Textile), in 1995 the name changed to ASOTRAMA (Asociación Trama) and, finally, TRAMA Textiles. The association operates a fair trade store and offers backstrap weaving classes in its central office in Quetzaltenango.
