= Aeroquetzal =

IATA	ICAO	Call sign
AW	—	Aeroquetzal
- Founded: 1987; 39 years ago
- Ceased operations: 1992
- Hubs: La Aurora Int'l Airport
- Focus cities: Mundo Maya Int'l Airport
- Fleet size: 3
- Destinations: 4
- Parent company: Aeroquetzal, S.A.
- Headquarters: Guatemala City, Guatemala

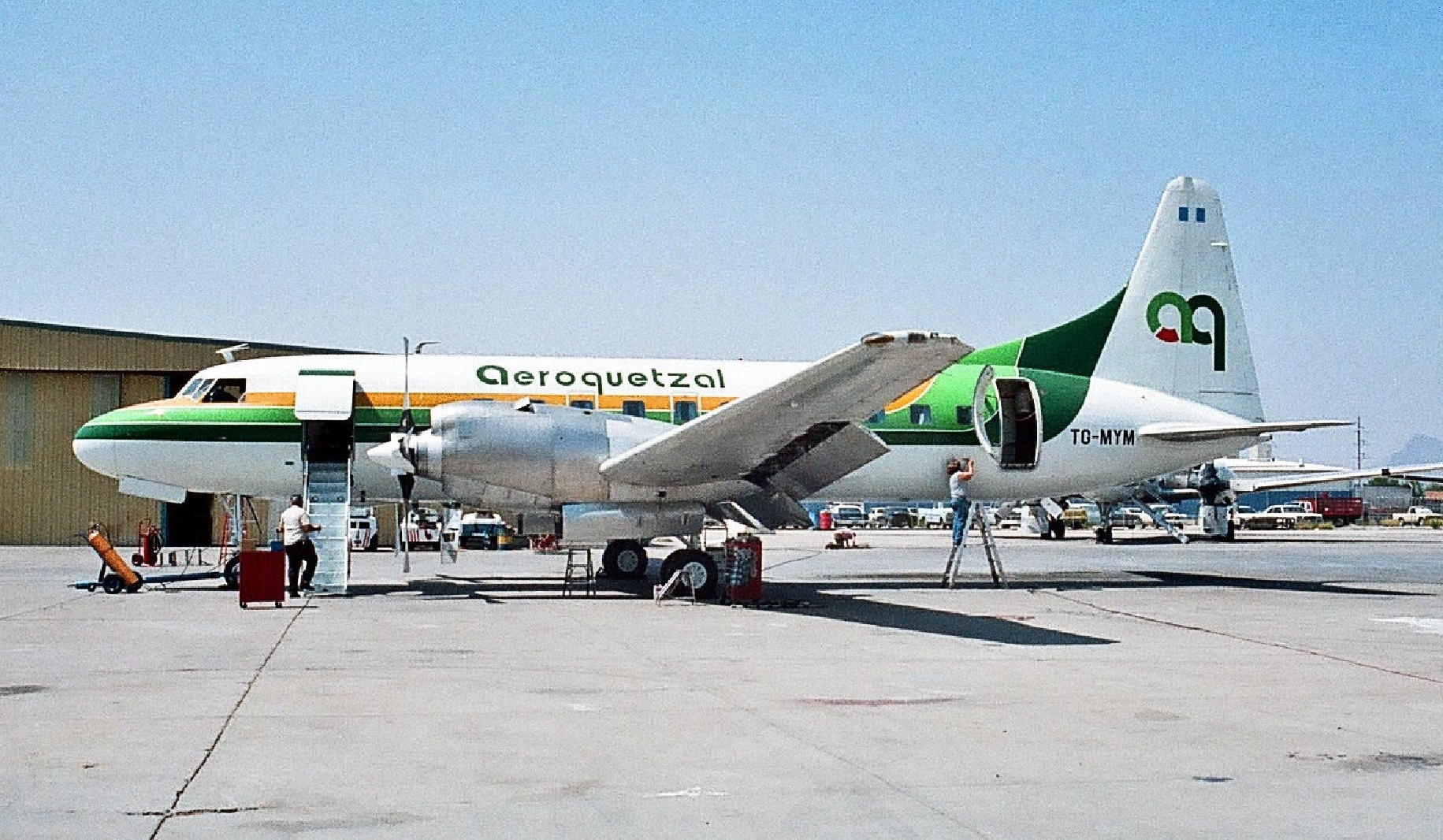
Aeroquetzal Convair CV-580 at Tucson Airport, 1987

Aeroquetzal is a defunct airline formerly based at Guatemala La Aurora International Airport. Flying only regional routes first, Aeroquetzal later became the first Guatemalan airline besides Aviateca to operate a short lived scheduled passenger flight to Los Angeles International Airport in 1991. The flight existed for around one month only. However, like for all other airlines operating in Guatemala, the most important route was the one from Guatemala City to Flores Mundo Maya International Airport near Tikal. The airline ceased operations in 1992 due to financial problems.

== Fleet ==
The Aeroquetzal fleet included:

- 1 Convair 580 TG-MYM (now with Air Chathams)
- 1 McDonnell Douglas DC-9 N31UA (ex-KLM)
- 1 Airbus A-320 N482GX leased over three weeks from Lacsa

== Destinations ==
- Guatemala La Aurora International Airport
- Mundo Maya Int'l Airport
- Cancún International Airport
- Los Angeles International Airport

There were also flights existing between Flores and Cancún.
