= Helicópteros de Guatemala =

Guatemalan airline

- Commenced operations: July 20, 1971
- Fleet size: See Fleet below
- Headquarters: Guatemala City, Guatemala

Helicópteros de Guatemala (HdG) is an airline based in Guatemala City which commenced operations on July 20, 1971. The airline was founded by Héctor Simón Morataya Morales and has a licence to fly within Guatemala, Mexico and Central America.

== Services ==
The airline provides charter services covering diverse missions.

Helicópteros de Guatemala has been appointed AgustaWestland's independent sales representative for Guatemala.

== Fleet ==
HdG operates five helicopters:

- 1 Eurocopter AS350 B-3
- 1 Bell 206 (JETRANGER)
- 3 Bell 206 L-1 (LONGRANGER III)
