= 2022 European heatwaves =

Heat waves affecting Europe in 2022

Meteorological history
- Duration: 10 June 2022 - 12 September 2022
- Heat wave
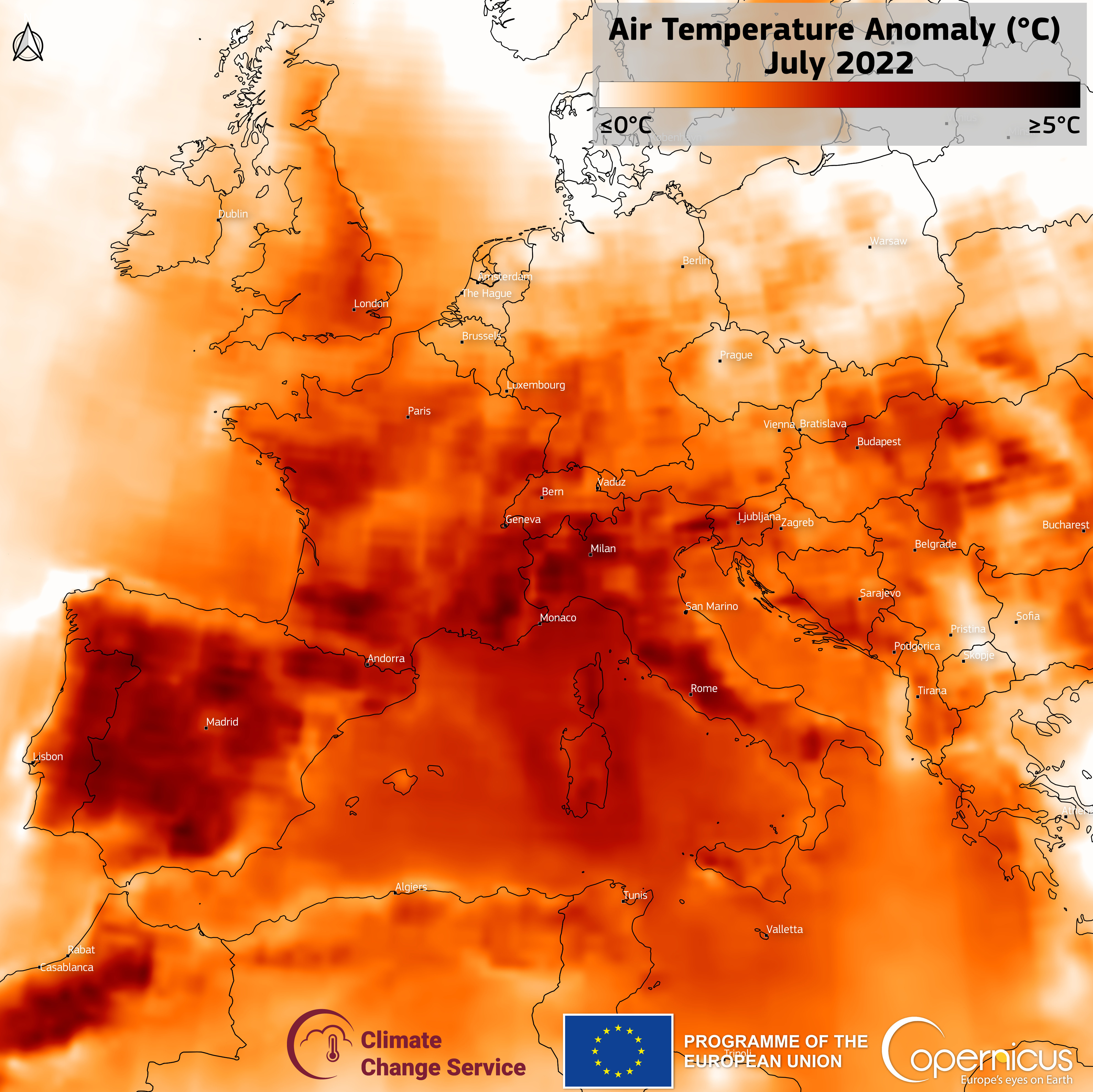
- A temperature anomaly map in Europe for July
- Max temp: 47.0 °C (116.6 °F), recorded at Pinhão, Portugal on 14 July 2022

Overall effects
- Fatalities: ~20,000 (reported); ~70,000 (estimated)
- Damage: €40 billion (US$40.2 billion)
- Areas affected: Andorra; Austria; Belgium; Croatia; Denmark; Finland; France; Germany; Greece; Hungary; Ireland; Italy; Luxembourg; Malta; Netherlands; Norway; Poland; Portugal; San Marino; Serbia; Slovakia; Slovenia; Spain; Switzerland; United Kingdom; Sweden

Between June and September 2022, large parts of Europe were affected by persistent heatwaves which killed tens of thousands and caused billions of euros in damage. They were the deadliest meteorological event of the year and caused thousands of wildfires, as well as widespread droughts across much of the continent.

The first heatwave, which came in June, led to temperatures of 40–43 °C (104–109 °F), with most severe temperature anomalies in France, where several records were broken. A second more severe heatwave occurred in mid-July, extending north to the United Kingdom, where temperatures surpassing 40 °C (104 °F) were recorded for the first time. A third heatwave began in August, with parts of France and Spain expected to reach temperatures as high as 38 °C (100 °F). Although temperatures in most places subsided in August, a smaller heatwave impacted France on 12 September, with temperatures reaching 40 °C (104 °F) once again.

In late 2023, a study published by the Barcelona Institute for Global Health estimated that there were over 70,000 heat-related deaths across Europe during the heatwave, a significant increase from earlier estimates.

== Meteorology ==
The June heatwave was the result of an interaction among the high pressures that generate atmospheric stability; Tropical Storm Alex; the strong sunshine of the boreal summer; and an air mass emanating from North Africa that had entered the Iberian Peninsula loaded with suspended dust that caused haze in the centre and south of the peninsula.

Climatologists linked the extreme heat to the impact of climate change, and experts predict that changes in the jet stream as a result of climate change will cause heatwaves with increasing frequency in Europe. Furthermore, due to the jet stream, the increase in heatwaves for European countries is three-to-four times higher than other countries in northern mid-latitudes, such as the United States.

== Estimates of death toll ==
Deaths by country
Country	Reported	Estimated/unofficial
Austria	-	352
Austria	-	419
Belgium	-	434
Bulgaria	-	1,277
Croatia	-	731
Cyprus	-	101
Czech Republic	-	279
Denmark	-	252
Estonia	-	167
Finland	-	225
France	c. 7,000	12,000
Germany	4,500+	8,173
Greece	-	3,092 (estimated)
Hungary	-	513
Italy	-	18,010
Latvia	-	105
Liechtenstein	-	1
Lithuania	-	381
Luxembourg	-	44
Malta	-	76
Montenegro	-	50
Netherlands	-	469
Norway	-	30
Poland	2	763
Portugal	1,066	2,212
Romania	-	2,455
Serbia	-	574
Slovakia	-	365
Slovenia	-	154
Spain	4,655	11,324
Sweden	-	40
Switzerland	-	302
United Kingdom	2,985	3,469

Reports of the death toll varied significantly. In July 2023, researchers from Barcelona Institute for Global Health estimated 61,672 heat-induced problems between 30 May and 4 September in a finding published in Nature Medical. The study gathered data from 35 countries with a combined population of 543 million people. A statistical framework was paired against historical meteorological records to observe the trend of deaths. The researchers said that they used weekly mortality data to develop their model which may not allow for short-term changes and hence may underestimate the actual number of deaths. Countries around the Mediterranean Sea, especially Italy, Spain, Portugal and Greece, experienced higher death rates. In November 2022, Reuters stated that there were 20,000 "excess" deaths recorded; deaths which officials did not directly attribute to heat but may be heat-induced. In November 2023, the Barcelona Institute for Global Health revised their number to over 70,000 "excess" deaths after developing a new method to calculate the mortality rate. The new research utilised daily temperature and mortality data as opposed to the previous research method using weekly data. The researchers claimed the previous figure underestimated the true number by 10.28 percent.

== By country ==
=== Andorra ===
On 15 June, Andorra's weather agency, the National Meteorological Service of Andorra, issued a "significant danger weather warning" due to heat. The weather warning was expected to last until 27 July with 24 and 25 July being the days in which the agency expected to raise the warning to "extreme danger weather warning". In the nation's capital, Andorra la Vella, temperatures were recorded to be over 36 °C (97 °F), far higher than the average for the time of year.

=== Austria ===
On 30 June, a temperature of 36.7 °C (98.1 °F) was recorded in Bad Deutsch-Altenburg, this was also Austria's heat record for June.

On 5 August, a temperature of 36.3 °C (97.3 °F) was recorded in Austria's capital city Vienna.

=== Belgium ===
On 19 July, the temperature reached 38.1 °C (100.6 °F) in Uccle, with the highest temperature that day being 40.0 °C (104.0 °F) in Kapelle-op-den-Bos.

=== Croatia ===
The heat dome which caused extreme temperatures in north-west Europe was expected to affect Croatia from 21 to 24 July. Temperatures peaked on 23 July, reaching 38–39 °C (100–102 °F) in cities including Zagreb, Osijek, Karlovac, Slavonski Brod, Knin. The highest temperature of 39.4 °C (102.9 °F) was recorded in Valpovo. Temperatures exceeding 40 °C (104 °F) were also recorded, but only at unofficial weather stations. The heat was ended the same day by a cold front in continental Croatia, but higher temperatures continued in the southern part of the country, which had been suffering a drought since 2021.

=== Denmark ===
On 20 July, it reached 35.9 °C (96.6 °F) in Abed, Stokkemarke Parish, Lolland Municipality, breaking the all-time temperature record for that month. Copenhagen measured its record highest temperature when it reached 35.6 °C (96.1 °F), breaking the previous 2006 record. In Vordingborg it reached 35.8 °C (96.4 °F), and stayed above 35 °C (95 °F) for 4 hours, another Danish record.

=== Finland ===
Finland was hit by the heatwaves in late June and early July. The highest temperature of 32.5 °C (90.5 °F) was measured on 29 June in Utsjoki.

=== France ===
==== June heatwave ====
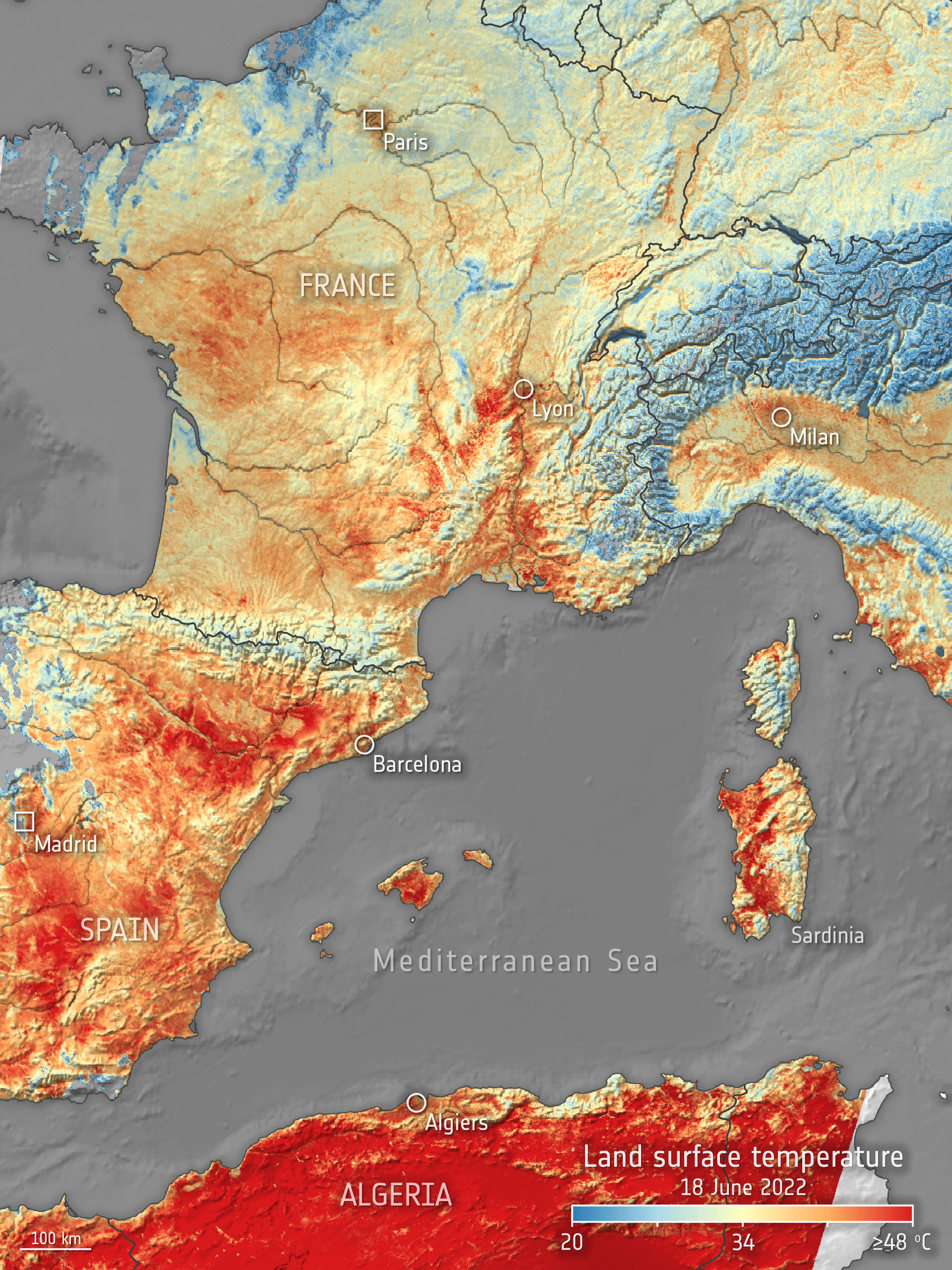
European Space Agency image from 18 June, showing many areas of France above 34 °C (93 °F)

On 16 June, Météo-France activated its red alert in 12 departments and its orange alert in another 25 because of the heatwave. The departments on red alert were mainly those located in the south-west, along the Atlantic coast and the south; the heat was generally less severe further north and east. The heatwave was the earliest in the year since records began and marked the fourth time that a red heat alert had been issued since the protocol was activated after the 2003 heatwave.

On 17 June, the red alert was activated in 14 more departments, adding the Hautes-Pyrénées and the Pyrénées-Atlantiques to the 12 of the previous day. The orange alert was activated in 56 more departments.

==== July heatwave ====
Satellite image of the impact of the July 2022 wildfire in Gironde.

An estimated total of more than 20,800 ha (51,000 acres) were burnt by wildfires in Gironde, causing a total of near 37,000 people to be evacuated.

On 20 July, a baby died in an overheated car in the Pyrénées-Atlantiques. Authorities reported the deaths of two others in work-related accidents, which was raised to four on 28 July, all likely attributed to the extreme heat.

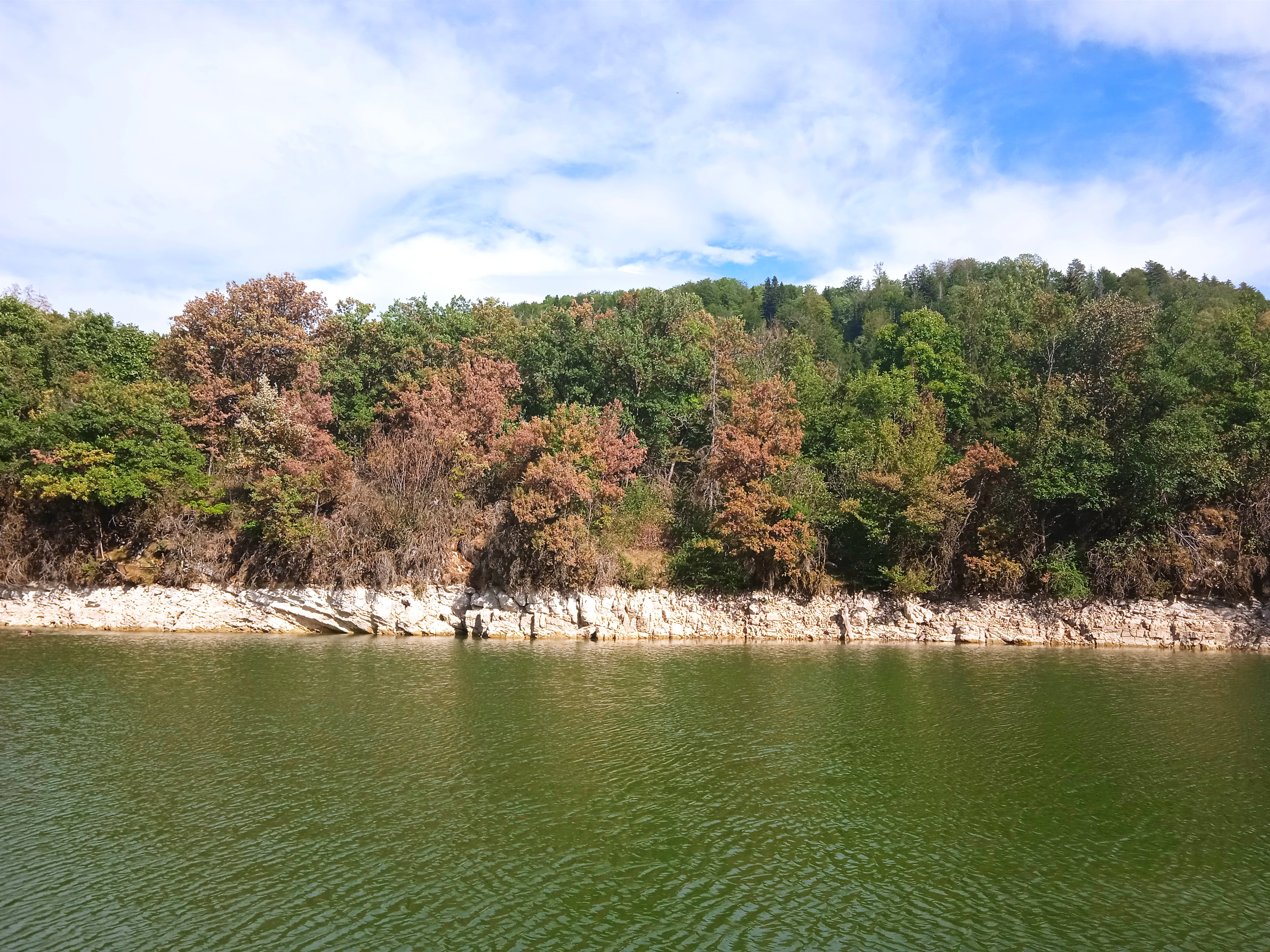
Dried trees in Ravilloles, Jura

Temperatures exceeded 40 °C (104 °F) even in Brittany, which is unprecedented. It reached 42.6 °C (108.7 °F) in Biscarrosse (Landes), 42.4 °C (108.3 °F) in Cazaux (Gironde), 42.0 °C (107.6 °F) in Nantes (Loire-Atlantique), 41.5 °C (106.7 °F) in La Roche-sur-Yon (Vendée), 40.3 °C (104.5 °F) in Lanmeur (Finistère) and 39.3 °C (102.7 °F) in Brest (Finistère).

This July heatwave aggravated the drought that had been ongoing in the country since the start of the year, making July 2022 the driest July since records began.

==== September heatwave ====
A smaller heatwave affected southwestern France on 12 September, where temperatures reached as high as 40.1 °C (104.2 °F) in Bégaar. According to Meteociel, monthly temperature records were broken at more than 70 Météo France stations.

==== Deaths ====
The French Public Health Agency officially reported 7,000 deaths. On 6 September, Le Monde unveiled a report by INSEE, estimating the number of deaths due to the summer (between 1 June and 22 August) heatwaves was likely 11,000.

=== Germany ===
==== June heatwave ====
From 14 to 20 June, Germany saw 1,636 probable heat-related deaths attributed to temperatures reaching 39.2 °C (102.6 °F).

==== July heatwave ====
From 11 to 17 July, Germany saw an all-deaths excess death rate of 16% followed by 23% in the week from 18 to 24 July. This corresponds to 6,502 excess deaths. On 20 July, temperatures in several states reached new records. Temperatures in Hamburg reached 40.1 °C (104.2 °F), 40.0 °C (104.0 °F) in Lower Saxony and Saxony-Anhalt, 39.6 °C (103.3 °F) in Mecklenburg-Vorpommern and 39.1 °C (102.4 °F) in Schleswig-Holstein. The highest temperature recorded on 20 July was 40.3 °C (104.5 °F) in Bad Mergentheim.

==== Deaths ====
The Robert Koch Institute put the death toll of the heatwaves at over 4,500.

=== Greece ===
From mid–June to mid–August, Greece experienced one of its biggest heatwaves. A temperature of 42.1 °C (107.8 °F) was recorded on 23 June in Fthiotida.

=== Guernsey and Jersey ===
On 18 July, a temperature of 34.2 °C (93.6 °F) was recorded at Guernsey Airport, the record for July and just 0.1 °C lower than Guernsey's all-time record, which was on 9 August 2003.

Also on 18 July, a temperature of 37.9 °C (100.2 °F) was recorded at Maison St Louis Observatory, Jersey, the highest temperature ever recorded in Jersey.

=== Hungary ===
==== July heatwave ====
On 22 July, a temperature of 38.5 °C (101.3 °F) was reported at Újpest in Budapest, which broke the maximum temperature record for that day in the city. On 23 July, a temperature of 41.5 °C (106.7 °F) was recorded at Kiskunfélegyháza and Hódmezővásárhely, which almost broke the all-time temperature record of 41.9 °C (107.4 °F) in Hungary.

==== August heatwave ====
On 2 August, Lake Velence reached record low water levels of 58 cm (23 in) due to severe drought.

On 3 August, the National Meteorological Service issued a third-level heat warning, with temperatures forecast to reach the low 30s and possibly exceeding 35 °C (95 °F) from 4 to 6 August.

On 9 August, the National Directorate General for Water issued a press release, which stated that in the first 7 months of 2022, the amount of rainfall was 45 per cent below average, making it the driest year since 1901.

On 16 August, the National Meteorological Service issued a third-level heat warning, with temperatures forecast to reach above 35 °C (95 °F) from 17 to 19 August. On 17 August, a temperature of 37 °C (99 °F) was recorded at Baja and Kübekháza, breaking the Hungarian temperature record for that day. Due to the heat warning, the Hungarian State Railways and Volánbusz were distributing mineral water at major railway stations, rural railway stations and bus stations.

=== Iceland ===
On 15 August 2022 the temperature reached 30.1 °C (86.2 °F) in Neskaupstadur. It was Iceland's warmest day since 22 June 1939.

=== Ireland ===
==== July heatwave ====
Met Éireann issued a high-temperature advisory on 13 July, with temperatures forecast to reach the high 20s and possibly exceeding 30 °C (86 °F) from 17 to 19 July. Met Éireann subsequently issued a Status Yellow high-temperature warning for Ireland on 15 July, with "exceptionally" high temperatures possibly reaching 32 °C (90 °F).

On 18 July, a temperature of 33.2 °C (91.8 °F) was reported at Allenwood one of the highest temperatures ever recorded in Ireland, breaking the Irish temperature record for July. The record highest temperature had been 33.3 °C (91.9 °F) at Kilkenny Castle in June 1887, but some in recent years have called for the reassessment of the previous record.

==== August heatwave ====
Met Éireann issued a high-temperature advisory on 7 August, with temperatures forecast to reach above 25 °C (77 °F) for a period of five days or more from 10 to 14 August. Met Éireann subsequently issued a Status Yellow high-temperature warning for Leinster and Munster on 9 August, warning of "very warm or hot" from 11 to 13 August, with "maximum temperatures of 27–29 °C (81–84 °F)". Met Éireann extended its high-temperature warning nationwide from 12 August with highs of 30 °C (86 °F) forecast.

On 12 August, a temperature of 31.7 °C (89.1 °F) was reported at Oak Park, County Carlow, breaking the Irish temperature record for August.

Met Éireann issued a nationwide Status Orange thunderstorm warning on 14 August, with heavy downpours of rain and hail forecast.

On 15 August the forecasted thunderstorms caused flooding, mainly in County Roscommon and County Carlow.

Irish Water appealed to people to conserve water as much as possible and warned that 37 water supplies around the country were being impacted by drought conditions.

=== Italy ===
==== June to August heatwave ====
In Italy, the number of wildfires was three times the historical average by the end of June. Temperatures in Rome reached 40.8 °C (105.4 °F) on 28 June. On 22 July, sixteen cities including Rome were put on the red state of alert, the country's highest heatwave alert to warn of serious health risks. A glacier collapse on the mountain of Marmolada on 4 July killed eleven, and was attributed to the abnormally warm temperatures. On 5 July, a state of emergency was declared in five northern regions in response to a severe drought in the Po valley, the worst in 70 years, and later for Tuscany. In total, an estimated 18,010 excess deaths were reported due to the heat wave.

On the evening of 18 July, a large fire began in Massarosa, Lucca, which has destroyed 900 ha (2,200 acres) as of 21 July 2022, reaching the province of Pisa.

On 19 July in Trieste, there was a blackout caused by a fire in Carso.

==== October heatwave ====
From 3 October a new heat wave (first high pressure from the Azores, and then an African anticyclone) hits Italy, bringing drought back to northern Italy despite another 4 previous months of absent rains. 30 °C is exceeded in many locations.

=== Luxembourg ===
On 18 June, the temperature reached 33.8 °C (92.8 °F) in Luxembourg City.

On 19 July, it reached 36.3 °C (97.3 °F) in Luxembourg City. And 40.1 °C (104.2 °F) in Esch-sur-Alzette.

=== Malta ===
June was record warm for Malta, and the temperature reached a record high for June with 39.0 °C (102.2 °F) on 28 June.

July was also warmer than usual, and on 5 July the temperature reached 36.8 °C (98.2 °F).

=== Netherlands ===
On 18 July, the Royal Netherlands Meteorological Institute issued a code orange heat warning for the central and southern provinces, with forecasted temperatures of 36 °C (97 °F) in central provinces and 38–39 °C (100–102 °F) in the south on 19 July. On 19 July the temperature in Maastricht reached 39.5 °C (103.1 °F).

Extreme heat is rare in the Netherlands; there have been only nine days with temperatures above 35 °C (95 °F) since the start of measurement at the central weather station in 1901 (as of 18 July 2022). In 2019, the Netherlands experienced temperatures surpassing 40 °C (104 °F) for the first time in recorded history, with 40.7 °C (105.3 °F) recorded in Gilze-Rijen.

According to satellite measurements, the southernmost Belgium–Netherlands border may have reached 42 °C (108 °F), which could be the highest provisional temperature recorded in the country.

=== Norway ===
==== June heatwave ====
On 28 June, Tromsø Municipality reached 29.7 °C (85.5 °F) and Saltdal Municipality reached 31.6 °C (88.9 °F), both records for June. The village of Mehamn reached 30.8 °C (87.4 °F), higher than its previous record for June by almost 10 degrees.

==== July heatwave ====
In July, the Norwegian Meteorological Institute reported that several areas may reach temperatures higher than 30 °C (86 °F). In Stavanger, temperatures are forecasted to reach 32 °C (90 °F). In Nordland county, 20 and 21 July were forecasted to be the hottest days, with temperatures above 25 °C (77 °F). In Øst-Finnmark and Finnmarksvidda, temperatures on 21 and 22 July were predicted to reach 25 °C (77 °F). However, the Meteorological Institute does not believe that any national records will be broken.

=== Poland ===
On 19 June, temperatures in western Poland exceeded 36 °C (97 °F). In Słubice, the highest temperature was 38.3 °C (100.9 °F), which equals the record for highest June temperature (set in 2019). Once again, temperatures peaked at the end of the month. On 30 June, nine meteorological stations recorded record-breaking monthly temperatures. New monthly records were also set on 1 July. In Tarnów, the temperature reached 37.7 °C (99.9 °F), breaking the record for July. Krosno recorded 35.5 °C (95.9 °F), the highest temperature in that station's history.

On 24 June, a man died in the queue of cars at the Polish-Ukrainian border by suspected overheating. On 26 June in Płońsk, a man died from a suspected sunstroke.

=== Portugal ===
According to Instituto Português do Mar e da Atmosfera (IPMA), the heatwave was the longest and had the greatest area extension of any July heatwave in Portugal since 1941. Two towns in the central part of the country, Alvega and Mora, registered maximum daily temperatures between 40 and 46 °C (104 and 115 °F) for ten days in a row, and Pinhão, a town situated in Northern Portugal's Douro Valley, recorded 47.0 °C (116.6 °F), the highest temperature ever recorded in the month of July.

In July, a total of 30,000 ha (74,000 acres) were burnt by wildfires in Leiria, blocking a part of the A1 motorway that runs from Porto to Lisbon. In Algarve, a fire began in the city of Faro that spread to the Quinta do Lago resort. According to the Civil Protection Authority, at least 135 people were injured since the wildfires began. A pilot died when his waterbombing plane crashed in Vila Nova de Foz Côa while combating wildfires in the region.

At least 238 people died and 187 were injured because of the heat. According to the Portuguese Health Ministry, the heatwave killed 1,063 people between 7 and 18 July. Three people—two firefighters and a civilian—died in wildfires triggered by the heatwaves.

=== San Marino ===
In late July, San Marino experienced a heatwave. On 24 July the temperature reached 39.6 °C (103.3 °F) in Dogana.

=== Serbia ===
On 23 July the temperature reached 40.0 °C (104.0 °F) in Niš, only 4.9 °C under the record from 2007.

=== Slovakia ===
The first tropical day (Slovak: tropický deň), a day with a temperature of over 30 °C (86 °F) as defined by the Slovak Hydrometeorological Institute, was recorded in Dolné Plachtince on 22 June. On 26 June, several weather stations in the Eastern Slovakia and Banská Bystrica Region reported temperatures around 33 °C (91 °F). The inflow of warm air from the south-west intensified to the point when at least two weather stations recorded a temperature of 35 °C (95 °F) or more from 27 June until the end of the month. On 29 June, several stations reported a temperature of 37 °C (99 °F).

=== Romania ===
On 24 July the temperature reached 39.3 °C (102.7 °F) in Bucharest and Craiova.

=== Slovenia ===
==== Summer heat waves ====
On 28 June, the Slovenian Environment Agency (ARSO) recorded a temperature of 38.0 °C (100.4 °F) in Podnanos. It surpassed Slovenia's previous record June temperature of 37.5 °C (99.5 °F), which was recorded in Metlika in 2000.

On 4 July, the ARSO reported that temperatures reached 38.4 °C (101.1 °F) in Bilje. At the agency's stations in Podnanos and Volče near Tolmin, temperatures reached 38.0 °C (100.4 °F) on 4 July and 38.9 °C (102.0 °F) on 22 July, respectively. On 23 July, temperatures of 38.0 °C (100.4 °F) or higher were recorded at several stations in the ARSO network, reaching 38.9 °C (102.0 °F) at Cerklje ob Krki Airport and 39.4 °C (102.9 °F) in Dobliče, with the latter remaining the highest temperature that was officially recorded in Slovenia during the month, meaning that the country's record July temperature of 40.6 °C (105.1 °F), which was recorded in 1950 in the nearby town of Črnomelj, was not surpassed.

In mid-July, the ARSO reported the status of droughts as significant or severe for most of western and central Slovenia. By the end of the month, agriculture was affected by droughts in the entire country, although they were especially severe in its south-west.

Along with periods of wind, long-lasting and severe droughts were mentioned as one of the key factors that facilitated the spread of the wildfires that broke out in the Karst Plateau around the southern part of the Italy–Slovenia border on 17 July and became the most extensive spread of wildfires ever recorded in Slovenia three days later, when it was reported that an estimated 1,900 ha (4,700 acres) of land were burnt. By 25 July, the spread of the wildfires in the Karst Plateau was largely stopped, but minor fires were still appearing in the affected areas. It was initially estimated that 3,500 ha (8,600 acres) of land were burnt and the estimate was updated to 3,600 ha (8,900 acres) on 1 August, following a few minor spreads that were quickly stopped.

On 5 August, temperatures exceeding 37.0 °C (98.6 °F) were recorded at five stations in the ARSO network, reaching 37.5 °C (99.5 °F) in Dobliče, Litija and the Bežigrad District of Ljubljana, and 37.1 °C (98.8 °F) in Celje and at Cerklje ob Krki Airport. On 18 August, temperatures of 34.0 °C (93.2 °F) or higher were expected in many parts of Slovenia.

On 1 September, the ARSO reported that temperatures of 30.0 °C (86.0 °F) or higher were recorded in Bilje on a total of 80 days, which surpassed the location's previous record of 76 days and a national record of 77 days in Podnanos, both of which were recorded in 2003.

==== Autumn heat waves ====
On 14 September, temperatures of up to 29.0 °C (84.2 °F) were expected. The night between 14 and 15 September was unusually hot in many parts of Slovenia. The ARSO reported that temperatures did not fall below 20.0 °C (68.0 °F) at several stations in their network, with the one at Portorož Airport not recording temperatures lower than 24.4 °C (75.9 °F) during the night.

On 1 November, temperatures exceeded 25.0 °C (77.0 °F) at several stations in the ARSO network, reaching 26.2 °C (79.2 °F) in Dobliče and exceeding the location's previous record November temperature of 25.2 °C (77.4 °F). New records were set at several other stations in the ARSO network and Slovenia's previous record November temperature of 25.6 °C (78.1 °F), which was recorded in Metlika in 2015, was surpassed at four of the agency's stations.

=== Spain ===
==== June heatwave ====
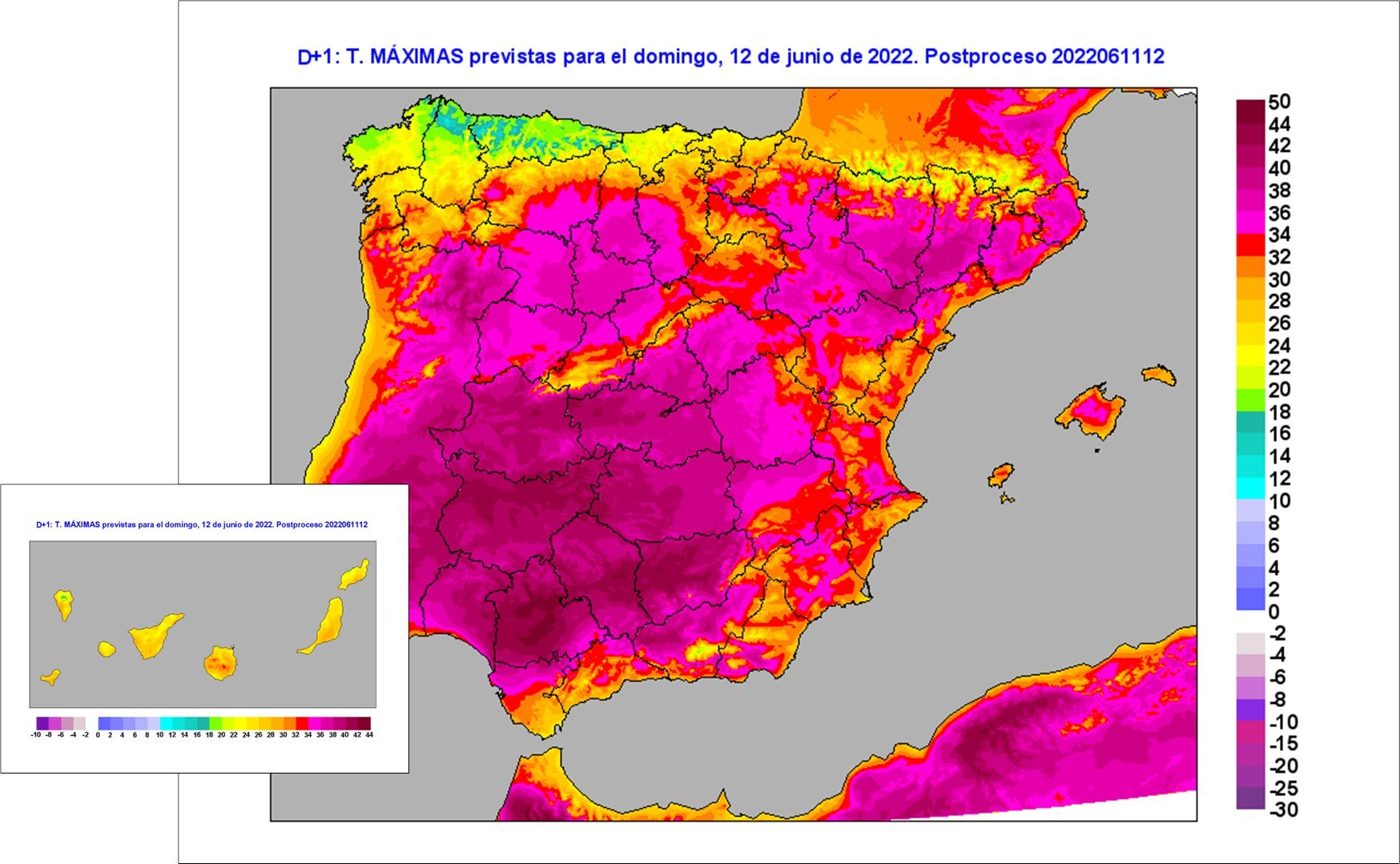
Forecast maximum temperatures for 12 June in the Iberian Peninsula.

A special heat warning was activated by the AEMET on 10 June, but only for 12 provinces and with yellow alerts in Aragon, Castilla-La Mancha, Catalonia, Extremadura and Madrid, with an orange alert for Andalusia. In this first stage, the unusual heat did not affect the Canary Islands, Galicia, the western Cantabrian coast and points of the peninsular Mediterranean coast. Initially, the AEMET predicted that the heatwave would last until 15 June, although it speculated that the heat might continue for the rest of the week.

On 11 June, high temperatures were recorded in the south-west of the peninsula, with 41.0 °C (105.8 °F) in Seville. The alerts also remained activated for Aragon, Castile and León, Castilla-La Mancha, Catalonia and Madrid at a yellow level, and at an orange level for Extremadura and Andalusia. However, the weather conditions did not meet the official criteria to start the heatwave.

On 12 June, temperatures reached 43.2 °C (109.8 °F) in Almadén (Ciudad Real), the highest value on the official start day of the heatwave. Temperatures above 40 °C (104 °F) were also recorded at 47 stations in the AEMET network. The agency issued special notice number 3/2022 with information about the phenomenon and initiated a national plan of preventive actions with a level-assignment map.

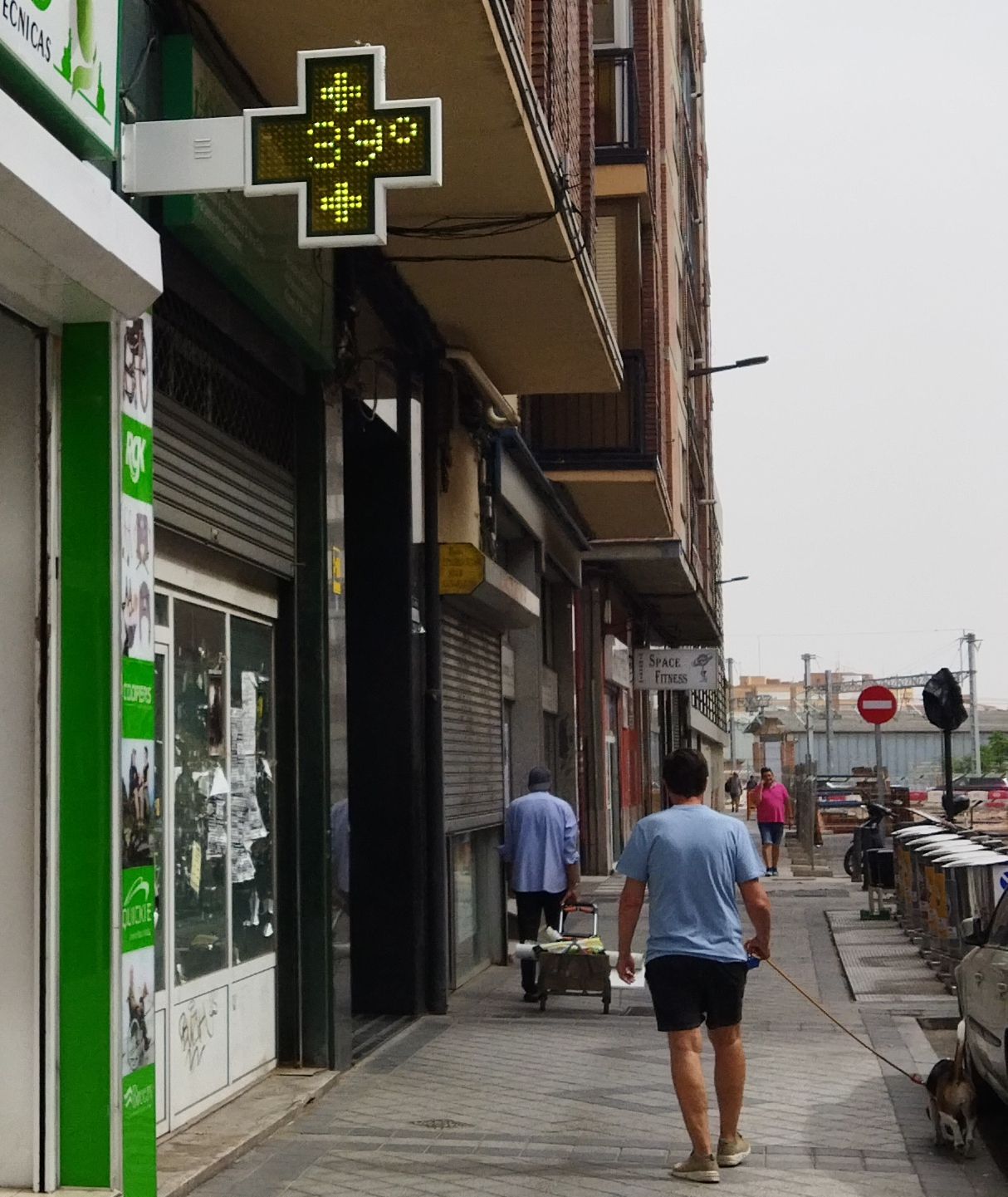
A thermometer showing 39 °C (102 °F) on a street in Valladolid on 15 June.

On 14 June, the heatwave spread to the south of Galicia and the interior of the Cantabrian Sea. Tropical nights also continued, with temperatures that did not fall below 20 °C (68 °F) in many provinces; in Jaén, a minimum of 27 °C (81 °F) was expected. It was predicted that the peak of the heatwave would be reached on Friday, 17 June, with the possibility of record-breaking temperatures in Zaragoza, Lleida and Córdoba.

The only points in Spain that were not affected are Asturias, the Canary Islands and the autonomous cities of Ceuta and Melilla. In its daily statement, AEMET predicted the end of the weather episode for 18 June, with hot African air causing instability and a drop in temperatures.

Rubén del Campo of AEMET stated that it was the "most intense heatwave for mid-June of, at least, the last 20 years."

The first day of application of the "Iberian exception", by which the regulated price of electricity is calculated with a cap on gas for its generation, was 15 June. The PVPC is the voluntary price for the small consumer, for which more will be paid for electricity for compensation to thermal power plants and the greater use of gas and coal in the midst of a heatwave.

The last day of the Spanish heatwave was 18 June, an event termed "intense, extensive and extraordinary" according to AEMET, which determined that the springtime heatwave was among the earliest in the year since Spain began keeping records.

Estimates from the Carlos III Health Institute placed the total June death toll at 830.

==== July heatwave ====
In July, Extremadura experienced wildfires that spread to Salamanca in Castile and León and burnt more than 4,000 ha (9,900 acres).

On 14 July, the Carlos III Health Institute announced that at least 43 people had died on 10 and 11 July from the heat. On 16 July, at least 360 people died between 10 July and 15 July from the heat.

On 17 July, a wildfire began in El Pont de Vilomara, Catalonia, which burnt 30 houses and more than 1,700 ha (4,200 acres) of land.

On 18 July, the Carlos III Health Institute reported an additional 150 heat-related deaths on 16 July, bringing the total death toll to 510, which was raised to 679 the next day. Final estimates from the Carlos III Health Institute placed the total July death toll at 2,063. However, in a report published later in the year, the July death toll was placed at 2,223.

On 24 July, the Seville city council gave the ongoing heat wave the name Zoe, thereby making it the first named heat wave in the world.

During July, Córdoba had an average high of 40.4 °C (104.7 °F), with 19 days above 40 °C (104 °F), making it the highest average maximum temperature ever recorded in Europe for the month of July.

The drought at the Valdecañas reservoir revealed the Dolmen of Guadalperal, a prehistoric stone circle.

==== August heatwave ====
Parts of Spain are expected to reach temperatures as high as 38 °C (100 °F).

In a report published later in the year, the August death toll was placed at 1,602.

=== Sweden ===
During the summer of 2022, Sweden experienced three heatwaves in late June, July, and mid-August.

==== June heatwave ====
The first heat wave lasted from 24 to 30 June, with maximum temperatures of 30–35 °C (86–95 °F). The heat wave culminated on 26 June, when the temperature reached 33.3 °C (91.9 °F) in Mariestad.

==== July heatwave ====
The highest temperature was measured on 21 July when the temperature reached 37.2 °C (99.0 °F) in Målilla. Temperatures above 35 °C (95 °F) are unusual in Sweden. In 2022, there were two days (20 and 21 July) with temperatures above 35 °C (95 °F). The heatwave was also unusual as the temperature reached 35–37 °C (95–99 °F) in a large area.

==== August heatwave ====
On 4 August the temperature reached 33.5 °C (92.3 °F) in Lund. This was followed by a heat wave lasting from 11 to 19 August, with maximum temperatures of 30–35 °C (86–95 °F). There was an unusually high number of tropical nights; on 16 August the temperature didn't fall below 22.3 °C (72.1 °F) on Gotska Sandön.

=== Switzerland ===
On 15 June, a heat-wave alert was activated in the canton of Ticino. The following day, the cantons of Geneva and Vaud issued alerts.

On the 16 June, the Federal Office for Meteorology and Climatology (MeteoSwiss) reported that temperatures of 31–33 °C (88–91 °F) had been measured in the southern Alps, central Valais and the Lake Geneva region, but had only exceeded the threshold to be considered a heatwave (average temperature of 25 °C (77 °F) throughout the day) at the local level.

On 17 June, MeteoSwiss activated orange and yellow alerts for heatwaves in most of the country. Maximum temperatures of 32–37 °C (90–99 °F) were expected between 17 June and 21 June in low-lying areas of Valais and Romande Switzerland, and between 18 June and 21 June in the Basel region.

On 4 August, a temperature of 38.3 °C (100.9 °F) was recorded in Geneva, the highest in the city all year.

=== United Kingdom ===
==== June heatwave ====
On 14 June, in view of the Met Office's forecast of high temperatures, the UK Health Security Agency (UKHSA) issued level 2 "alert and readiness" alerts in several regions for the period between midnight on 16 June and midnight on 18 June. The affected regions were London, the East Midlands, the East, South East and South West England.

On 15 June, the UKHSA issued level 3 "heat-wave action" alerts for London, East and South East England, maintaining level 2 alerts for the East Midlands and South West England. According to Met Office forecasts, the heat peak would arrive on Friday, reaching the necessary threshold for heatwave consideration, before temperatures dropped significantly on 18 June. On 17 June, London reached 32.7 °C (90.9 °F) on the hottest day of the June heatwave.

==== July heatwave ====
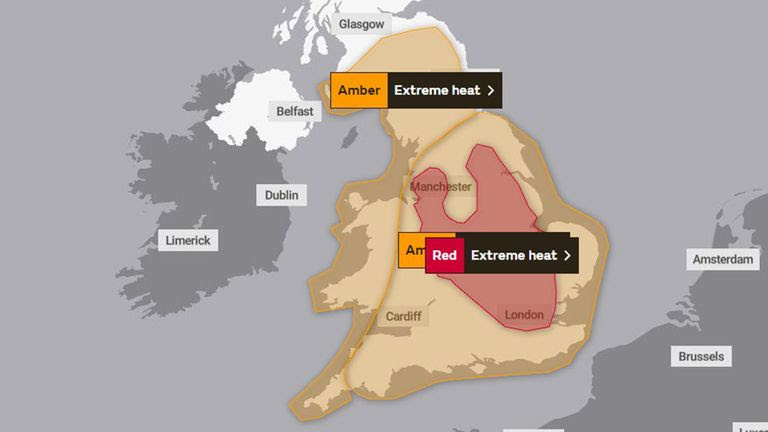
The weather warnings issued by the Met Office for 18 to 19 July.

On 8 July, the Met Office issued a heat-health alert in parts of England and Wales. On 15 July, the UKHSA increased the Heatwave Alert Level to 4, "illness and death occurring among the fit and healthy—and not just in high-risk groups". The Met Office issued its first ever red extreme heat warning after there were forecasts of over 40 °C (104 °F) in some parts of England, and a national emergency was declared.

On 18 July, the first day of the red warning, temperatures reached 38.1 °C (100.6 °F) in Santon Downham, Suffolk. Wales potentially broke its record for the highest recorded temperature, with 37.1 °C (98.8 °F) provisionally recorded in Hawarden. The Channel Islands potentially had a new record temperature as 38 °C (100 °F) was provisionally recorded in St Helier. Between 18 and 19 July, the United Kingdom experienced its highest recorded minimum nighttime temperature, at 25.9 °C (78.6 °F) at Emley Moor, West Yorkshire.

On 19 July, a temperature of 40.3 °C (104.5 °F) was recorded at RAF Coningsby, Lincolnshire; the highest temperature ever recorded in the country's history. The previous record was 38.7 °C (101.7 °F) recorded in July 2019, which was potentially broken in at least 34 places across England on 19 July, 6 of which were provisionally over 40 °C (104 °F), the Met Office reported. Scotland may also have a new record high of 35.1 °C (95.2 °F), recorded at Floors Castle.

The London Fire Brigade declared a major incident after several fires broke out across the capital as a result of the heatwave. 19 July was the brigade's busiest day since World War II.

There was about 3,200 heat-related deaths in the UK, 2,800 of whom were above the age of 65.

==== August heatwave ====
In August, Tom Morgan, a Met Office meteorologist, said that "temperatures will not go as high as they did during July" but will last over "a prolonged period" with "temperatures in the low-30s". On 8 August the UK Health Security Agency issued a level 3 heat health alert for central and southern England effective from 9 to 13 August, which was later extended to 14 August.

On 9 August, the Met Office issued an amber weather warning for extreme heat, which is in place for most of England and Wales from 11 to 14 August.

The highest temperature recorded in the UK on 11 August was 34.2 °C (93.6 °F) in Wiggonholt, West Sussex.

Thunderstorms began following the end of the heatwave on 15 August.

=== Vatican ===
The Vatican was also affected by the heatwave like surrounding Italy. On 28 June 2022, the Vatican measured its highest temperature ever recorded when the temperature reached 40.8 °C (105.4 °F). On 24 July the temperature reached 39.7 °C (103.5 °F).

== Highest temperature by country ==
These are the highest temperatures recorded in each country affected by the heatwave.

Country	Temperature	Location	Date	Source
Andorra	41.0 °C (105.8 °F)	Andorra La Vella	17 June and 12 August	
Austria	36.7 °C (98.1 °F)	Bad Deutsch-Altenburg	30 June	
Belgium	40.0 °C (104.0 °F)	Kapelle-op-den-Bos	19 July	
Croatia	39.4 °C (102.9 °F)	Valpovo	23 July	
Cyprus	42.2 °C (108.0 °F)	Nicosia	25 June	
Czechia	38.6 °C (101.5 °F)	Vilice	20 July	
Denmark	35.9 °C (96.6 °F)	Abed, Lolland	20 July	
Estonia	33.0 °C (91.4 °F)	Suuresta	19 August	
Finland	32.5 °C (90.5 °F)	Utsjoki	29 June	
France	42.6 °C (108.7 °F)	Biscarrosse	19 July	
Germany	40.3 °C (104.5 °F)	Bad Mergentheim	20 July	
Gibraltar	44.2 °C (111.6 °F)	Westside	14 July	
Greece	42.1 °C (107.8 °F)	Fthiotida	23 June	
Guernsey	34.2 °C (93.6 °F)	Guernsey Airport	18 July	
Hungary	41.5 °C (106.7 °F)	Hódmezővásárhely and Kiskunfélegyháza	23 July	
Iceland	30.1 °C (86.2 °F)	Neskaupstadur	15 August	
Ireland	33.2 °C (91.8 °F)	Allenwood	18 July	
Italy	46.6 °C (115.9 °F)	Perugia	24 July	
Jersey	37.9 °C (100.2 °F)	Maison St. Louis Observatory, Saint Helier	18 July	
Latvia	34.2 °C (93.6 °F)	Ventspils	25 June	
Liechtenstein	37.3 °C (99.1 °F)	Vaduz	25 July	
Lithuania	34.4 °C (93.9 °F)	Ventė	28 August	
Luxembourg	40.1 °C (104.2 °F)	Esch-sur-Alzette	19 July	
Malta	39.0 °C (102.2 °F)	Valletta	28 June	
Monaco	37.4 °C (99.3 °F)	Monte Carlo	19 July and 24 July	
Netherlands	39.5 °C (103.1 °F)	Maastricht-Aachen Airport	19 July	
Norway	30.1 °C (86.2 °F)	Tromsø	2 July	
Poland	38.4 °C (101.1 °F)	Słubice	19 June	
Portugal	47.0 °C (116.6 °F)	Pinhão	14 July	
Romania	39.3 °C (102.7 °F)	Bucharest and Craiova	24 July	
San Marino	39.6 °C (103.3 °F)	Dogana	24 July	
Serbia	40.0 °C (104.0 °F)	Niš	23 July	
Slovakia	40.0 °C (104.0 °F)	Dolné Plachtince	21 July	
Slovenia	39.4 °C (102.9 °F)	Dobliče	23 July	
Spain	45.8 °C (114.4 °F)	Torremocha del Campo	14 July	
Sweden	37.2 °C (99.0 °F)	Målilla	21 July	
Switzerland	38.3 °C (100.9 °F)	Geneva	4 August	
United Kingdom	40.3 °C (104.5 °F)	Coningsby	19 July	
Vatican	40.8 °C (105.4 °F)	Saint Peter's Basilica	28 June	

== Highest temperature by capital city ==
Capital City	Temperature	Date	Source
Vienna	36.3 °C (97.3 °F)	5 August	
Zagreb	39.1 °C (102.4 °F)	23 July	
Copenhagen	31.9 °C (89.4 °F)	4 August	
Tallinn	32.9 °C (91.2 °F)	19 August	
Helsinki	29.5 °C (85.1 °F)	27 June	
Paris	40.3 °C (104.5 °F)	19 July	
Berlin	37.6 °C (99.7 °F)	20 July	
Dublin	33.1 °C (91.6 °F)	18 July	
Rome	41.2 °C (106.2 °F)	28 June	
Luxembourg City	36.3 °C (97.3 °F)	19 July	
Amsterdam	35.5 °C (95.9 °F)	19 July	
Oslo	28.5 °C (83.3 °F)	14 August	
Lisbon	39.8 °C (103.6 °F)	13 July	
Belgrade	39.0 °C (102.2 °F)	23 July	
Madrid	40.7 °C (105.3 °F)	14 July	
Stockholm	34.5 °C (94.1 °F)	21 July	
Bern	35.2 °C (95.4 °F)	19 July and 4 August	
London	40.2 °C (104.4 °F)	19 July	

== See also ==
- Heat waves of 2022
- 2022 European and Mediterranean wildfires
- 2022 European drought
- Climate change in Europe
- 2003 European heat wave, which caused over 70,000 excess deaths
- 2006 European heat wave
- 2018 European heat wave
- 2019 European heat waves
- 2022 Siberian wildfires
- 2021 Western North America heat wave
- 2023 European heat waves
- 2024 European heatwaves
- 2025 European heatwaves
- 2026 European heatwaves
- List of weather records
- Weather of 2022
