= 2023 European heatwaves =

Heat waves affecting Europe in 2023

Meteorological history
- Duration: June - September 2023
- Heat wave
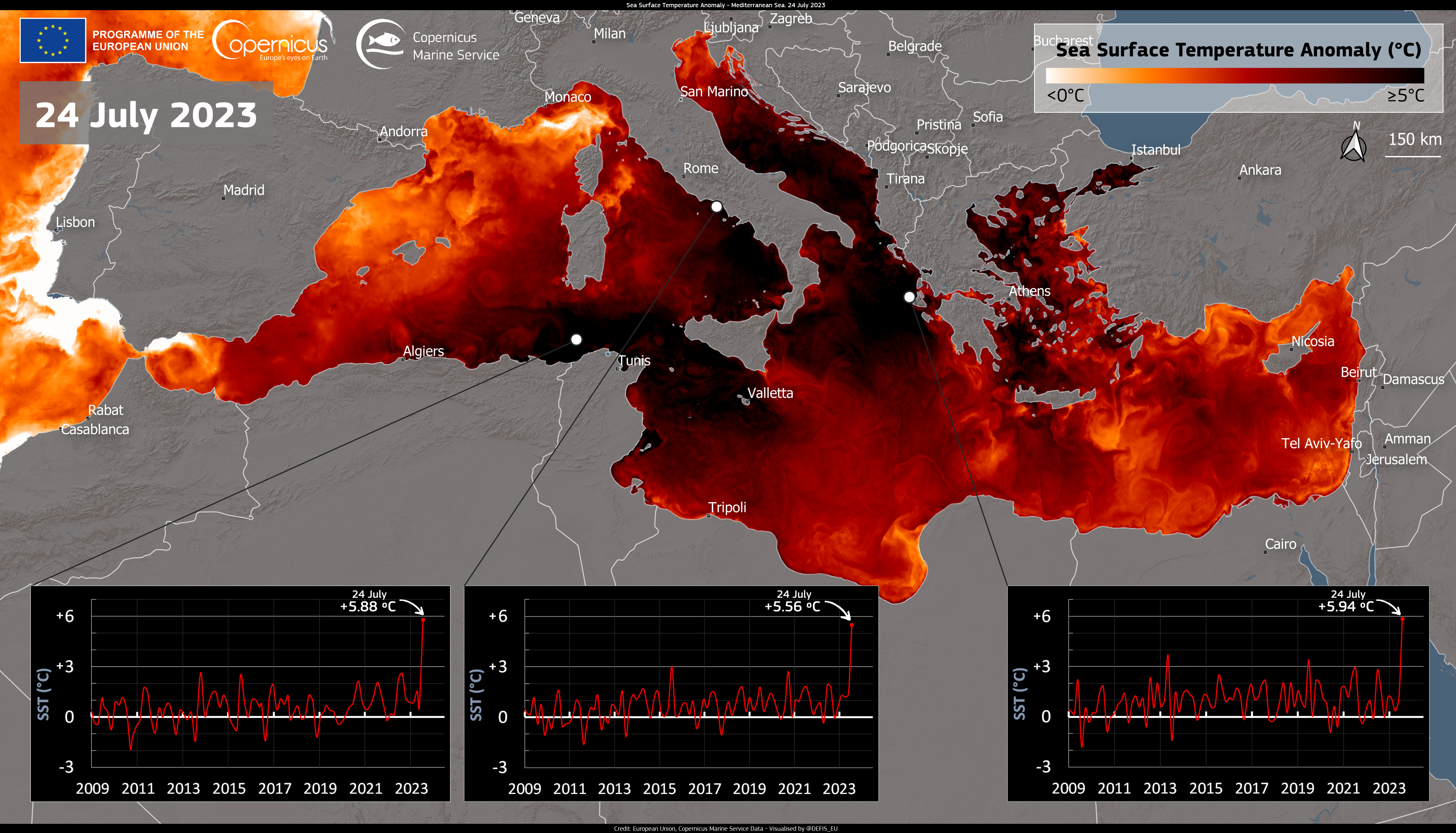
- Sea surface temperatures on 24 July
- Max temp: 47.8 °C (118.0 °F), recorded at Syracuse, Italy on 24 July 2023

Overall effects
- Fatalities: 47,000+: Italy: 10,000; France: 9,500; Spain: 7,500; Germany: 3,450; United Kingdom: 2,400
- Areas affected: Austria; Belgium; Bulgaria; France; Germany; Greece; Ireland; Italy; Malta; North Macedonia; Portugal; Romania; Moldova; Slovenia; Spain; Turkey; United Kingdom

In 2023, a series of heat waves impacted Europe. The most significant of which was the named heat wave, Cerberus Heatwave, which brought the hottest temperatures ever recorded in Europe. Starting on 10 July 2023, the record-breaking Cerberus anticyclone affected many European countries, with the effects felt most severely in parts of Southeast and Southwest Europe such as Cyprus, Greece, Italy, and Spain. The private Italian weather website iLMeteo named the extreme weather event after the hound of Hades from Greek mythology, and although some reports link the naming to the Italian Meteorological Society, the society's president said that they "absolutely don't use it".

Several regional temperature records were broken, and the heatwave prompted health warnings and government action in several countries.

According to the British Met Office, 2023 was expected to have more intense heatwaves than those experienced in 2022. In June, the European Environment Agency warned that schools and hospitals were at risk of high temperatures.

== Background ==
On 1 January 2023, at least eight European countries recorded their warmest January day ever: Liechtenstein, the Czech Republic, Poland, the Netherlands, Belarus, Lithuania, Denmark and Latvia. This was attributed to climate change.

Scientists have attributed the 2023 heat waves to human-made climate change. During each day in July 2023, two billion people experience heat conditions made at least three times more likely due to climate change and 6.5 billion people experienced this impact at least one day in this month. The heatwaves caused severe damage in southern US, Southern Europe, South and southeast Asia.

Heatwaves becoming more frequent and intense due to climate change are a big problem for Europe. The heatwaves in the year 2003 killed 70,000 people, while in the record breaking summer of 2022, 61,672 people died. The mortality was 56% higher among women in comparison to men. The countries with the highest rates of mortality were Italy, Greece, Spain and Portugal. According to one climate researcher Hicham Achebak: "The fact that more than 61,600 people in Europe died of heat stress in the summer of 2022, even though, unlike in 2003, many countries already had active prevention plans in place, suggests that the adaptation strategies currently available may still be insufficient,". In the future heat related mortality can be significantly higher. According to NASA senior scientist Katherine Calvin: "Future warming depends on future emissions".

== By country ==
=== Albania ===
Albania set its all-time high temperature record at 44 °C (111 °F) in Kuçovë.

=== Austria ===
On 18 June, temperatures above 30.0 °C (86.0 °F) were recorded at eight stations in the Ubimet network, reaching 31.3 °C (88.3 °F) in Bludenz and marking the beginning of a heat wave that was expected to peak on 22 June. Prior to 18 June, a temperature of 30.0 °C (86.0 °F) was not recorded at any official station in Austria since the beginning of 2023, marking the country's latest first occurrence of the value in a calendar year since 1990. On 22 June, temperatures of 35.0 °C (95.0 °F) or higher were recorded at eight stations in the Ubimet network, reaching 36.2 °C (97.2 °F) in Bad Goisern am Hallstättersee.

The second heat wave of 2023 was expected to affect Austria between 10 July and 13 July, with maximum temperatures of up to 36 °C (97 °F) predicted to occur during the first two days. After two days of heavy thunderstorms, temperatures in excess of 30 °C (86 °F) were expected to return on 14 July and reach as high as 38 °C (100 °F) in areas north of the Alps on 15 July. During the week starting on 17 July, heavy thunderstorms kept forming in western and southern Austria on a daily basis. They were especially intense in Styria and Carinthia, and also affected parts of Italy, Slovenia and Croatia.

=== Belgium ===
On 12 June 2023, officials issued a heat wave health warning. The highest temperature was measured on 8 July in Westmalle when it reached 34.4 °C (93.9 °F).

=== Bulgaria ===
Temperatures in Bulgaria reached 41 °C (106 °F) during the Cerberus heat wave. Temperatures stayed above 35 °C (95 °F) for more than 2 weeks.

=== Croatia ===
Temperatures reached 40 °C (104 °F) by 13 July, sparking a significant wildfire near Šibenik.

=== Cyprus ===
Temperatures in Cyprus neared 45 °C (113 °F) inland during the heatwave, with even elevated mountainous areas such as the Troodos region reaching a record-breaking 36 °C (97 °F). Government officials issued heat warnings and set up "heat shelters" in various cities.

=== Czech Republic ===
The Czech Republic experienced the hottest day of the year so far on 15 July. In several places, it was above 38 °C (100 °F), the warmest in Plzeň-Bolevec and Řež near Prague, where temperatures reached 38.6 °C (101.5 °F). Nearly 100 of the 160 or so stations measuring 30 years or more recorded temperature highs for 15 July.

=== France ===
By 1 June 2023, 50 departments of France were under orange vigilance and 24 under yellow vigilance. At least 80 heat-related deaths were recorded from 7–13 July. The highest temperature was measured on 23 August in Toulouse, when it reached 42.4 °C (108.3 °F). A report released by Public Health France on February 8, 2024, confirmed that 5,167 people died due to the heat during the summer in France in 2023.

=== Germany ===
Germany saw warmer than usual temperatures. The German government promised a plan to prevent heatwave deaths. On 22 June, temperatures rose to 35.7 °C (96.3 °F) during the nation's first heatwave of 2023. During a second heatwave, temperatures rose to 38 °C (100 °F) on 9 July. On 15 July, temperatures reached 38.8 °C (101.8 °F) in Möhrendorf (Bavaria).

On 20 July, the Robert Koch Institute estimated that at least 830 heat-related excess deaths occurred in the Germany between 10 April and 9 July.

=== Greece ===
On 14 July 2023, the World Meteorological Organization station in Thiva registered 44.2 °C (111.6 °F) making it the highest temperature in the country for that day. On the same day Athens recorded 43.4 °C (110.1 °F) in the suburb of Filothei. Officials in Athens announced midday closure of the Acropolis. On 15 July 2023, the National Observatory of Athens station in Elafonisi also recorded a maximum temperature of 44.2 °C (111.6 °F).

On 15 July, five people in Athens Urban Area were reported to have suffered from hyperthermia, while at least 10 more reportedly fainted, though it is not clear how many of them did so due to the heat. The Hellenic National Meteorological Service issued an Orange Warning for Extremely High Temperatures. On that day the highest temperature in the Athens metropolitan area was 43.6 °C (110.5 °F) in Aspropyrgos. On 20 July 2023, a delivery driver in Chalcis died from cardiac arrest, a few hours after he ended his shift. The man was found out to be uninsured and the owner of the grill house was later arrested. He was working for hours outdoors with temperatures exceeding 40 °C (104 °F). On 22 July 2023, Kato Tithorea registered 44.2 °C (111.6 °F) making it the highest temperature in the country for that day, while the World Meteorological Organization station in Lefkohori recorded 44.1 °C (111.4 °F).

On 23 July 2023, the World Meteorological Organization station in Gytheio recorded 46.4 °C (115.5 °F) making it the highest temperature in the country for that day while Nea Filadelfeia in Athens recorded 45.4 °C (113.7 °F). On 26 July 2023, the World Meteorological Organization station in Agia Triada recorded 46.1 °C (115.0 °F) making it the highest temperature in the country for that day.

Throughout the prolonged heat wave, wildfires devastated parts of the country, killing at least 28 people, mostly in the Athens metropolitan area and Rhodes.

=== Ireland ===
Met Éireann stated that 2023 had the hottest June on record with an average monthly temperature of greater than 16 °C and a maximum of 28.8 °C at Oak Park in County Carlow on Tuesday 13 June, setting a heat record for 13 June in Ireland.

=== Italy ===
Since 11 July, at least six men have died after collapsing while working due to the intense heat. Most of Southern Italy saw temperatures above 40 °C (104 °F), with temperatures as high as 48 °C (118 °F) estimated to hit Sicily and Sardinia by the middle of July.

The European Space Agency predicted that temperatures would exceed 48 °C (118 °F) in Sardinia some time in July. Tourists throughout the country were also observed to suffer from heat stroke, with a British visitor fainting at the Colosseum. It is also expected that an anticyclone dubbed "Charon" originating from North Africa may raise the temperature to above 45 °C (113 °F) in parts of Italy early in the week beginning 17 July.

On the two main islands temperatures reached their peak on July 24: in Sardinia, despite unofficial higher values having been reached, the highest reliable temperature recorded by a regional station belongs to Bari Sardo with 47.5 °C (117.5 °F). The same day on the island two national stations recorded their all-time record with 47.4 °C (117.3 °F) in Olbia and 46.8 °C (116.2 °F) in Decimomannu Air Base. In Sicily the highest temperature will be reached by the Syracuse station with 47.8 °C (118.0 °F), the same weather station that holds the highest official temperature in Europe. The same day the Palermo Astronomical Observatory observed a temperature of 47.0 °C (116.6 °F), the highest ever recorded in the Sicilian capital city since the beginning of the meteorological data records started in 1791. The heat was infernal and unbearable for practically the entire month, so much that July 2023 was the hottest month of July in Sicily so far: some stations in the Sicilian inland regions such as those of Caltanissetta and Enna recorded 11 consecutive days with maximum temperatures exceeding 40 °C (104 °F), as reported by the regional office SIAS (Sicilian agrometeorological information service).

=== Netherlands ===
From 8 June to 26 June the Netherlands experienced regional heatwaves. On 11 June the temperature reached 32.3 °C (90.1 °F) in Gilze-Rijen and Hoek van Holland, setting a heat record for June 11. Also on 12 June a heat record was broken when the temperature reached 31.8 °C (89.2 °F) in Gilze-Rijen. The unusually high temperatures continued, and on 25 June it was once again hot, with the temperature reaching 32.2 °C (90.0 °F) in Maastricht. After the June heatwaves temperatures went down, however another heatwave took place from 7 July to 12 July. On 8 July the temperature reached 34.6 °C (94.3 °F) in Eindhoven, setting a heat record for 8 July. The highest temperature was measured on 9 July when it reached 34.8 °C (94.6 °F) in Arcen. There was a third regional heatwave in September, with temperatures reaching 32.2 °C (90.0 °F) on 10 September in Eindhoven and Ell, setting a heat record for 10 September in the Netherlands.

=== Norway ===
On 13 July, temperatures of 28.8 °C (83.8 °F) were observed at northern Norway's Slettnes Lighthouse, breaking a record previously held for 80 years. On 15 June the temperature reached 31.8 °C (89.2 °F) in Oslo, setting a heat record for 15 June in Norway.

=== Romania ===
A first heat wave struck Romania after 3 July, with temperatures exceeding 35 °C (95 °F). A second heat wave arrived after 12 July, with temperatures reaching 39 Celsius degrees, prompting Romanian authorities to issue yellow and orange alerts. On 16 July, Elena Mateescu, the director of Romania's National Administration of Meteorology stated this month could be the warmest July in Romania in 120 years. As of 17 July, temperatures are expected to go even higher, eventually surpassing 40 °C (104 °F).

=== Slovenia ===
The first heat wave of 2023 in Slovenia began on 19 June and ended on 23 June, when many parts of the country experienced heavy thunderstorms due to the arrival of a cold front. Between 21 June and 23 June, the Slovenian Environment Agency (ARSO) recorded temperatures in excess of 34 °C (93 °F) at several stations in their network. The highest temperature during the period was 35.5 °C (95.9 °F), recorded at the ARSO station at Cerklje ob Krki Airport on 21 June, whilst temperatures at the ARSO station in Dobliče reached 34.9 °C (94.8 °F) on both 21 June and 23 June.

The second heat wave of 2023 in Slovenia lasted from 8 July to 12 July, before heavy rain and high winds affected much of the country on the morning of 13 July. On 10 July, several stations in the ARSO network recorded temperatures between 33 °C (91 °F) and 35 °C (95 °F), reaching as high as 35.1 °C (95.2 °F) in Osilnica, as well as 35.0 °C (95.0 °F) in both Bilje and Podnanos.

The third heat wave to affect Slovenia in 2023 began on 15 July and ended on 19 July, reaching its peak when temperatures between 32 °C (90 °F) and 37 °C (99 °F) were recorded in the lowlands on 17 July. The same day, temperatures at the ARSO station in Dobliče reached 37.2 °C (99.0 °F), which was the highest officially recorded temperature in Slovenia in 2023. A further three stations in the ARSO network recorded temperatures of up to 36.1 °C (97.0 °F) during the third heat wave, and the value of 35.0 °C (95.0 °F) was reached or exceeded at a further seven stations in the ARSO network.

=== Spain ===
Spain experienced the hottest April on record, with temperatures up to 39 °C (102 °F) recorded that month. Agriculture was heavily disrupted. In June and July three people died by heatstroke.

According to Carlos III Health Institute 659 mainly elderly people died between 8 July and 17 July due to heat. Between 21 June and 8 July 309 excess deaths were recorded, bringing the total to 968.

=== Switzerland ===
During the summer Switzerland experienced multiple heatwaves in July, August and September. The highest temperature measured during the heatwaves was 39.3 °C (102.7 °F) in Geneva on 24 August. Four per cent of its total glacier volume disappeared.

=== United Kingdom ===
The United Kingdom did not experience heatwaves as defined by the Met Office during the meteorological summer. Nevertheless, the mean temperature in June was 15.8 °C (60.4 °F), the warmest since records began in 1884, and 0.9 °C higher than the previous record, set in 1940 and 1976. The highest temperature was 32.2 °C (90.0 °F), recorded in Chertsey on the 10th and Coningsby on the 25th, and records were also broken in 72 of the 97 areas where temperature data are collected. The UK Health Security Agency (UKHSA) and the Met Office issued the first heat-health alert of the year on 7 June, after the launch of a new high temperature alert system. A yellow heat alert was issued for London, the east and west Midlands, and the east, south-east and south-west. A yellow alert was also issued for Northern Ireland on 12 June. A low pressure system over the country produced cooler, wetter weather in July and August.

==== September 2023 ====
In September, the UK was hit by a record-breaking heatwave, which lasted eight consecutive days. On 4 September, the UK Health Security Agency (UKHSA) issued a yellow heat-health alert from 2 p.m. that day to 9 p.m. on 10 September for all areas of England except the North East. This was increased to an amber heat-health alert on 5 September for all areas of except the North East, which received a yellow alert.

On 7 September, the record for most consecutive September days where temperatures reached 30 °C (86 °F), which was previously five days, was broken. Also on 7 September, a provisional temperature of 32.6 °C (90.7 °F) was recorded in Wisley, Surrey, which was the hottest day of the year until 9 September. The previous record for the greatest number of September days where temperatures have reached 30 °C (86 °F) or more was five, set in 1911, however it was broken on 9 September.

On 8 September, the record for highest September temperature in Northern Ireland was broken, with 28 °C (82 °F) recorded in Castlederg, County Tyrone. The previous record, set on 1 September 1906, was 27.6 °C (81.7 °F) in Armagh.

On 9 September, a temperature of 32.7 °C (90.9 °F) was recorded at Heathrow, making it the hottest day of the year. Kew Gardens later recorded 33.2 °C (91.8 °F), making 9 September 2023 London's second-hottest September day ever recorded. All operational London stations broke their previous records. Stations that have achieved higher temperatures in the past like Gravesend, Kent and Hampstead in London may have recorded even higher temperatures were they still operational during the heatwave.

On 10 September, the final day of the heatwave, temperatures exceeded 30 °C (86 °F) for the seventh consecutive day, peaking at 33.5 °C (92.3 °F) at Brogdale, near Faversham in Kent. This would also make September 10 the hottest day of 2023. As the heatwave broke, a yellow weather warning for thunderstorms was put in place for most Northern Ireland and parts of northern England and Wales and southern Scotland.

== Highest temperature by country ==
Country	Temperature	Location	Date	Source
Albania	44.0 °C (111.2 °F)	Kuçovë	25 July	
Andorra	43.0 °C (109.4 °F)	Andorra La Vella	23 August	
Austria	37.3 °C (99.1 °F)	Innsbruck	11 July	
Belarus	34.6 °C (94.3 °F)	Svetlogorsk	20 August	
Belgium	34.4 °C (93.9 °F)	Westmalle	8 July	
Bulgaria	43.0 °C (109.4 °F)	Ruse	25 July	
Croatia	41.5 °C (106.7 °F)	Karlovac	25 July	
Cyprus	46.0 °C (114.8 °F)	Nicosia	2 August	
Czechia	38.6 °C (101.5 °F)	Plzeň, Řež	15 July	
Denmark	32.1 °C (89.8 °F)	Abed, Lolland	15 July	
Estonia	33.1 °C (91.6 °F)	Pärnu	7 August	
Finland	32.0 °C (89.6 °F)	Turku	7 August	
France	42.4 °C (108.3 °F)	Toulouse	23 August	
Germany	38.8 °C (101.8 °F)	Möhrendorf	15 July	
Greece	46.4 °C (115.5 °F)	Gytheio	23 July	
Hungary	39.4 °C (102.9 °F)	Érsekhalma	20 July	
Iceland	22.7 °C (72.9 °F)	Neskaupstadur	21 August	
Ireland	29.1 °C (84.4 °F)	Lullymore Nature Centre, County Kildare	8 September	
Italy	47.8 °C (118.0 °F)	Syracuse, Sicily	24 July	
Kosovo	41.5 °C (106.7 °F)	Skënderaj	23 July	
Latvia	32.2 °C (90.0 °F)	Ventspils	12 September	
Liechtenstein	36.0 °C (96.8 °F)	Vaduz	15 July	
Lithuania	34.9 °C (94.8 °F)	Kalvarija	16 July	
Luxembourg	33.4 °C (92.1 °F)	Luxembourg City	9 July	
North Macedonia	40.5 °C (104.9 °F)	Prilep	23 July	
Malta	42.7 °C (108.9 °F)	Mosta	24 July	
Monaco	34.9 °C (94.8 °F)	Monte Carlo	24 August	
Moldova	40.3 °C (104.5 °F)	Cismichioi	15 August	
Netherlands	34.8 °C (94.6 °F)	Arcen	9 July	
Norway	31.8 °C (89.2 °F)	Oslo	15 June	
Poland	37.0 °C (98.6 °F)	Kędzierzyn-Koźle	15 July	
Portugal	46.4 °C (115.5 °F)	Santarém	7 August	
Romania	42.7 °C (108.9 °F)	Tulcea	15 August	
San Marino	39.9 °C (103.8 °F)	Borgo Maggiore	22 July	
Serbia	39.0 °C (102.2 °F)	Niš	4 August	
Slovakia	37.5 °C (99.5 °F)	Spišská Nová Ves	21 July	
Slovenia	37.2 °C (99.0 °F)	Dobliče	17 July	
Spain	46.8 °C (116.2 °F)	Valencia	10 August	
Sweden	30.0 °C (86.0 °F)	Stockholm	29 June	
Switzerland	39.3 °C (102.7 °F)	Geneva	24 August	
United Kingdom	33.5 °C (92.3 °F)	Brogdale	10 September	
Vatican	40.0 °C (104.0 °F)	Saint Peter's Basilica	22 July	

== Highest temperature per capital city ==
Capital City	Temperature	Date	Source
Vienna	36.2 °C (97.2 °F)	25 August	
Zagreb	33.7 °C (92.7 °F)	19 July	
Prague	36.1 °C (97.0 °F)	15 July	
Copenhagen	29.4 °C (84.9 °F)	9 July	
Helsinki	28.5 °C (83.3 °F)	21 June	
Paris	35.4 °C (95.7 °F)	9 September	
Berlin	34.3 °C (93.7 °F)	15 July	
Athens	45.4 °C (113.7 °F)	23 July	
Rome	41.8 °C (107.2 °F)	18 July	
Belgrade	37.4 °C (99.3 °F)	17 July	
Madrid	40.0 °C (104.0 °F)	21 August	
Lisbon	41.1 °C (106.0 °F)	7 August	
Bern	34.6 °C (94.3 °F)	24 August	
Dublin	28.7 °C (83.7 °F)	8 September	

== Storms and floods ==
On 22 June Belgium, the Netherlands and Germany experienced rainstorms that came paired with flooding. In the south of Limburg 60-80 millimeters of precipitation fell. Also in Wallonia and North Rhine-Westphalia there was flooding due to the rainstorms, with 60-100 millimeters near Plombières and Mönchengladbach.

From 4–6 July Storm Poly ravaged Northern Europe. On 5 July the storm caused much damage and inconvenience in the Benelux and Germany. On the morning of 5 July, a wind gust of 146 km/h (41 m/s) was measured at IJmuiden. Storm Poly was the most severe summer storm in the Netherlands since at least 1911.

In late June and mid-July, the combination of daytime temperatures of 35 to 40 °C (95 to 104 °F) and high humidity led to formation of a series of uncommonly strong, supercell storms in the area ranging from Slovenia to Romania. On 23 June, large hail destroyed crops in parts of Slovenia and Hrvatsko Zagorje. In Croatia, the storm also broke windows in Varaždin and tore roofs off several houses in Međimurje. On 13 July, one such storm travelled 1,100 km (680 mi), producing hail throughout its distance with stones up to 14 centimetres (5.5 in) in diameter in Krško, Slovenia, and a wind speed in excess of 100 km/h (62 mph; 28 m/s) in Zrenjanin, Serbia.

=== 19 and 21 July storms ===
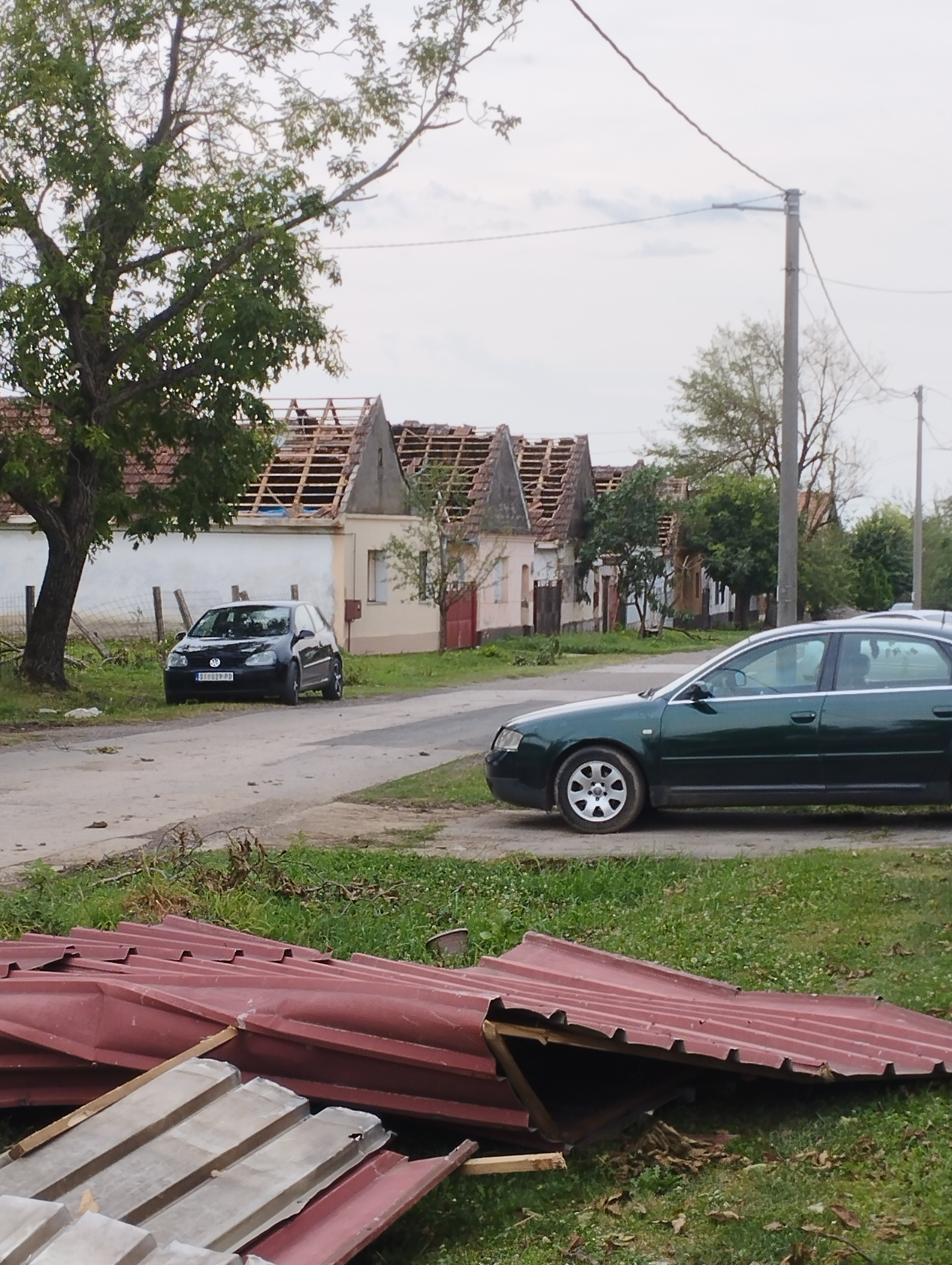
Storm damages in Banovci, Croatia.

On 19 July, a particularly strong supercell caused extreme wind damage in Slovenia and northern Croatia. Six people were killed: four in Croatia (two in Zagreb, one in Cernik, Brod-Posavina County, and an on-duty firefighter in Tovarnik in the Vukovar-Srijem County), one near Lake Bled, Slovenia, and one in Brčko, Bosnia and Herzegovina. Many more were injured, including at least 60 in Zagreb, 10 of them severely. The storm caused extensive wind damage and electricity outages in parts of Slovenia, northern Croatia and northern Serbia. Winds of 115 km/h (71 mph; 32 m/s) were recorded at the Zagreb Airport, and over 100 km/h in Belgrade and Sremska Mitrovica, Serbia. A state-operated automated weather station near Županja, Croatia recorded a 180 km/h (110 mph; 50 m/s) wind gust. The storm moved quickly, hitting Zagreb around 4 pm and Belgrade around 8 pm (CEST). Zagreb saw 20–35 mm (0.79–1.38 in) of rainfall within 10 minutes.

In the afternoon of 21 July, a similar storm travelled over northern Croatia, dealing the brunt of its damage in Istria and Rijeka, where seven people were injured and one was missing. It subsequently hit Zagreb with wind gusts up to 80 km/h (50 mph; 22 m/s), downing more trees, stopping tram traffic, and damaging the Croatian Parliament building among others. Three deaths were recorded in Serbia. In Novi Sad, a well-known celtis australis in the city centre, more than 150 years old and a first-class listed natural heritage object, was obliterated, with its trunk shattered.

=== 24 and 25 July storms ===
On 24 July, a particularly strong supercell storm caused extreme wind damage in Lombardy, Veneto and all northern Italy. The Delta DL 185 flight departing from Milan Malpensa Airport and bound for New York JFK was diverted to Rome-Fiumicino Airport, after being damaged by a violent hailstorm.

In Lombardy, two people were killed by falling trees, while two more people died in a road accident caused by the road surface slippery from the rain. Several others were injured across the region.

=== Early August floods ===
In the first week of August, a cut-off low led to torrential rains in excess of 100–200 mm (4–8 in) and flooding in Slovenia and parts of Croatia and Austria. The June and July storms led to the soil in the region being highly saturated with water, which caused rivers to overflow, producing historic flooding at a time of year when the local nivo-pluvial river regime predicts minimum levels. At least seven people were killed in Slovenia and Austria. The flood wave crest entered Croatia on the night of 5–6 August, causing localised flooding and breaking records at several gauges. In Drnje, Croatia, near the confluence of Mura and Drava, a century-old record was broken by more than half a metre (2 ft). Croatian Armed Forces deployed 150 soldiers to assist with flood defences.

== See also ==
- 2003 European heat wave
- 2006 European heat wave
- 2007 European heat wave
- 2019 European heat waves
- 2022 European heat waves
- 2022 European drought
- 2022 heat waves
- 2023 European drought
- 2023 heat waves
- 2024 European heatwaves
- List of heat waves
