= 2023 European drought =

Drought experienced in Europe

In 2023, Europe experienced drought-like conditions amid heat waves.

== France ==
The Pyrénées-Orientales Department of Southern France officially declared itself at a drought "crisis" level on 10 May. A dry winter limited replenishment of water tables, depleted in the 2022 European drought. Agriculture in France was impacted.

== Italy ==
At Lake Garda, where the water level is 70 cm (27 in) lower than average, the Alps reportedly had 63% less snow than usual. As a result of water shortages, rice production has been cut. Canals in Venice dried up.

== Spain ==
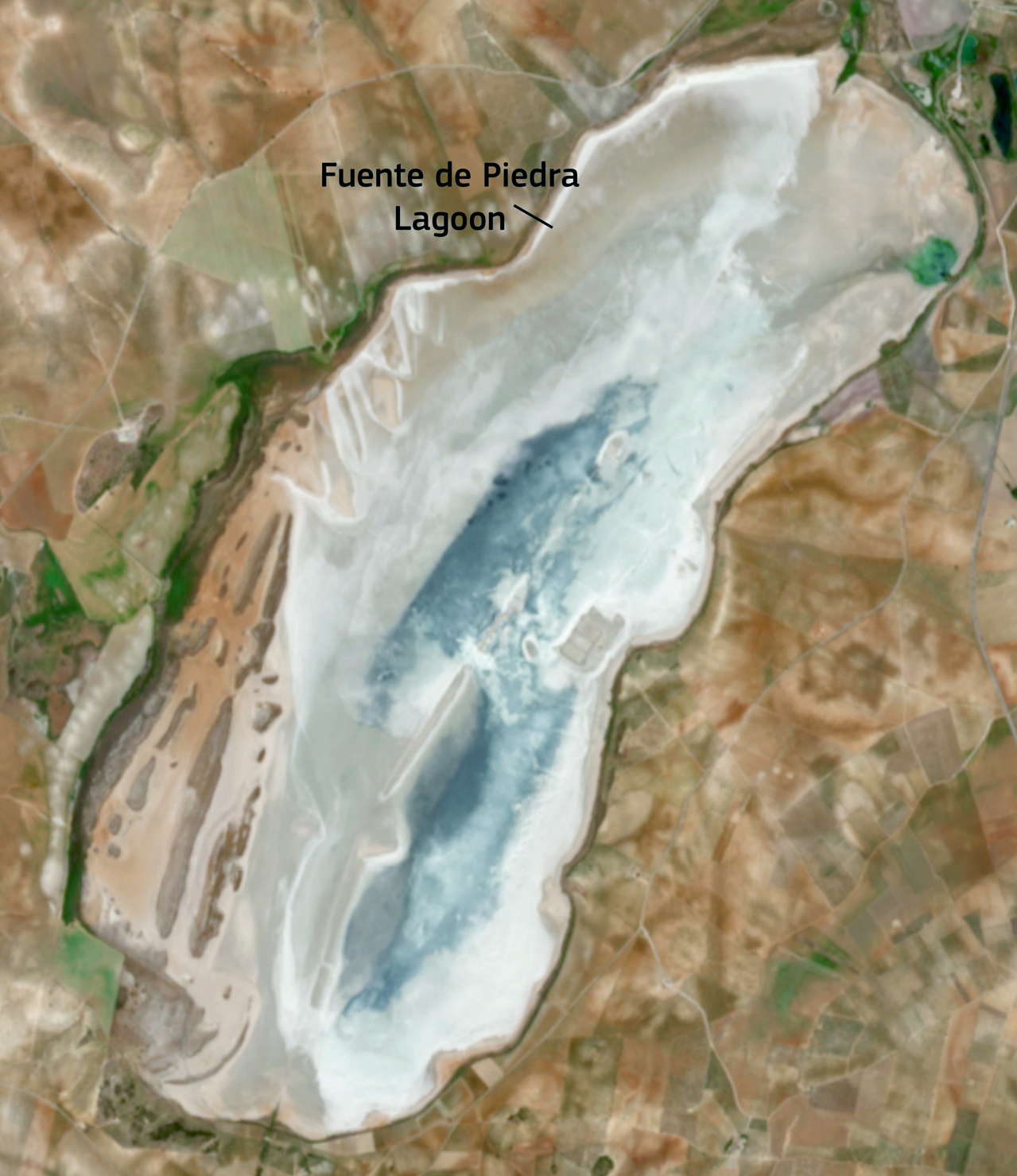
The Fuente de Piedra Lagoon is now a salt flat due to the heat.

In Catalonia, the Sau reservoir was reduced to nine per cent of its total capacity. 2023 has been Catalonia's worse drought in decades. The April 2023 heat wave has also exacerbated drought problems. The Fuente de Piedra Lagoon went dry for the first time in 20 years due to the heatwave.

The Doñana National Park was threatened by drought.

== United Kingdom ==
Drought warnings were put in place for the summer. It was the driest February since 1993. Scientists said that this increased the drought risk for other regions of England.

It was the wettest March in over 40 years for England and Wales. According to South West Water, Devon and Cornwall are experiencing the driest conditions in nearly 90 years. From 25 April 2023, South West Water extended a hosepipe ban to parts of Devon.

== See also ==
- Climate change in Europe
- 1540 European drought
- 2022 heat waves
- 2022 European heat waves
- 2022 European drought
- 2023 European heat waves
- 2020–2023 North American drought
