= 2022 European drought =

Drought experienced in Europe

2022 European drought

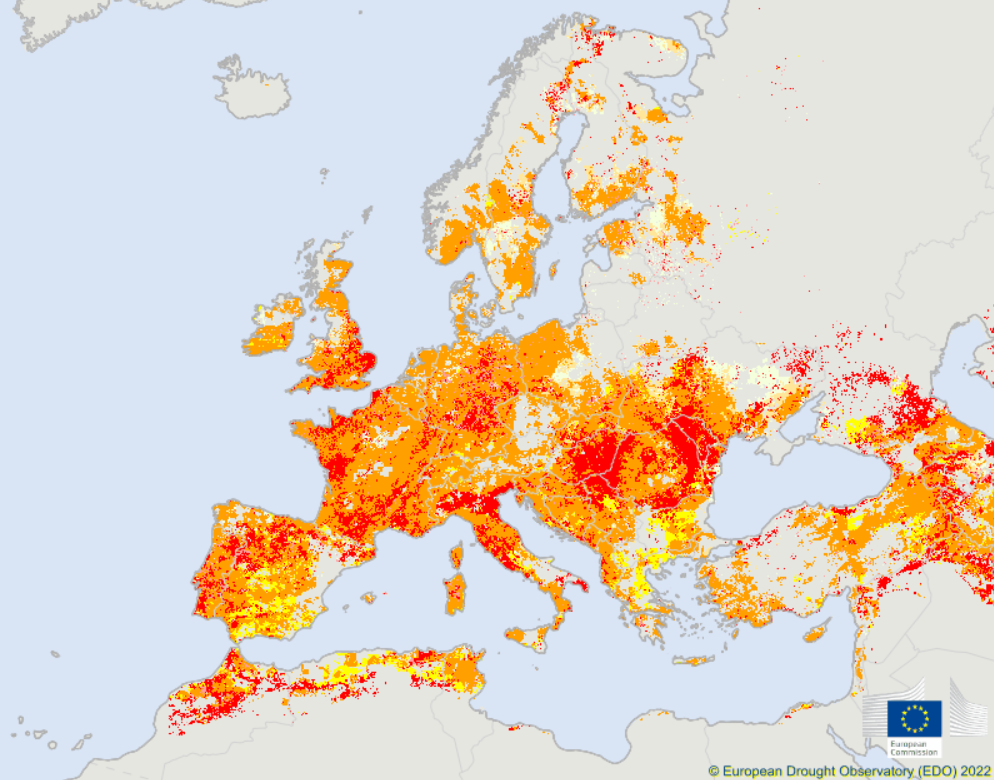
Drought alerts in Europe on 21 July 2022.

During the summer of 2022, parts of Europe experienced drought conditions exacerbated by heat waves. This was preceded by a warm and dry spring. On 9 August, a senior European Commission researcher said that it seemed to be Europe's worst year in 500 years. A report from the Global Drought Observatory has confirmed this. The drought had serious consequences for hydropower generation and the cooling systems of nuclear power plants, as the drought reduced the amount of river water available for cooling. Agriculture in Europe was also negatively affected by the drought. Scientists found that while precipitation deficits primarily caused the lack of water in the soil, human-induced global warming contributed to over 30% of the drought intensity and its spatial extent via enhanced evaporation.

== France ==
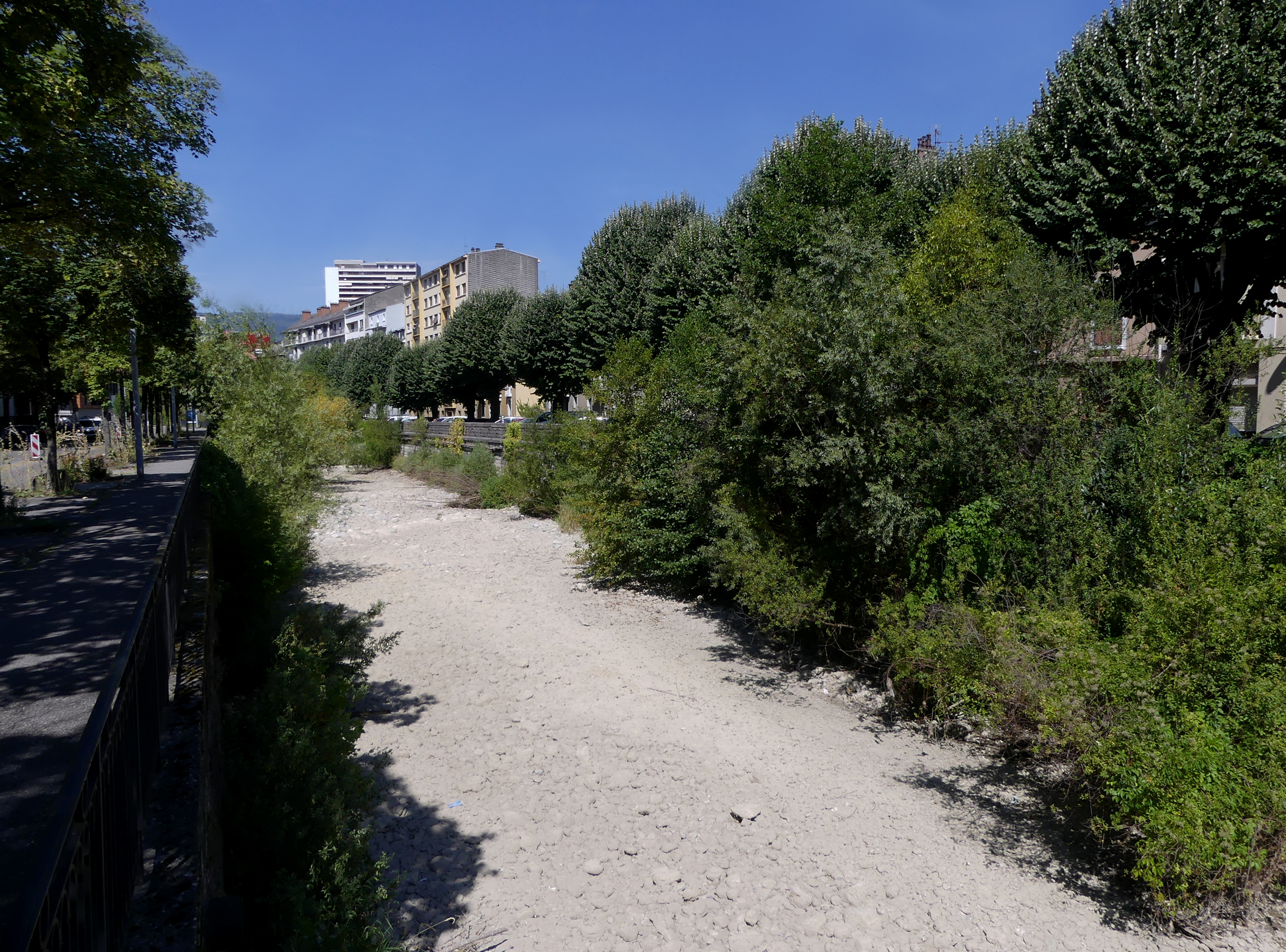
The dried up Leysse at the entrance to Chambéry on 28 July 2022.

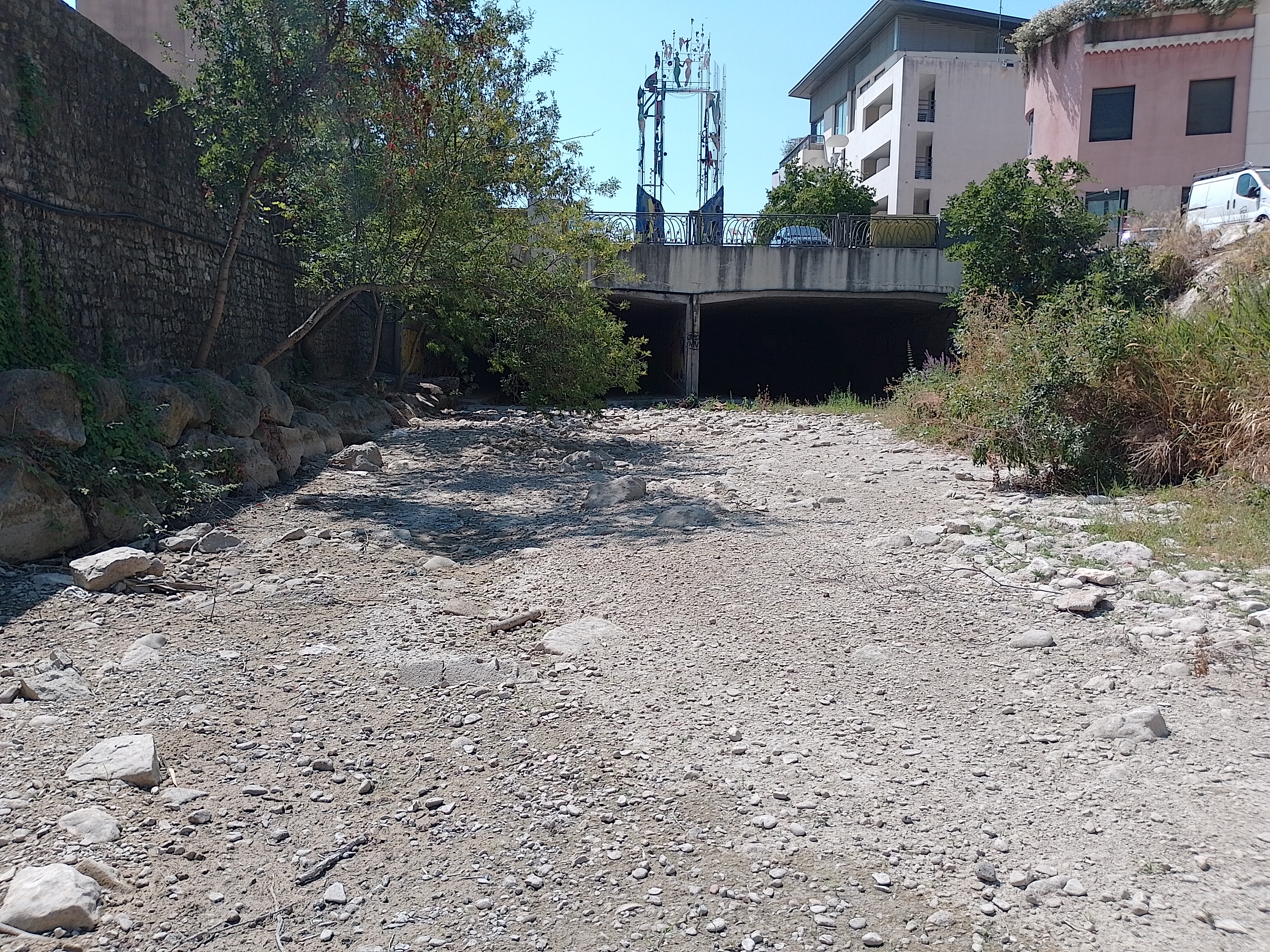
The Huveaune dried up in Aubagne in July 2022.

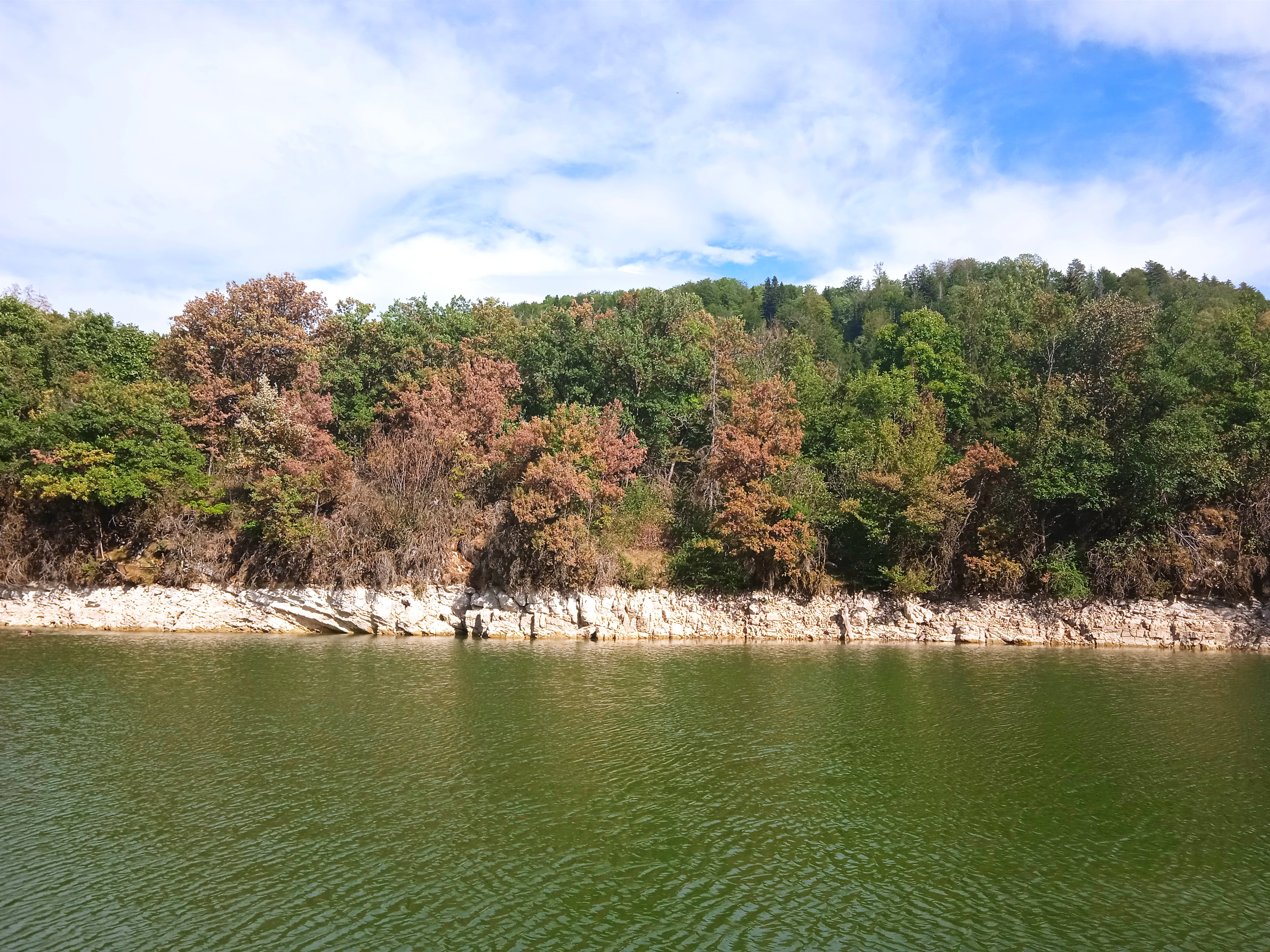
Dried trees in Ravilloles, Jura

Drought alert in France by departments on 12 August 2022.

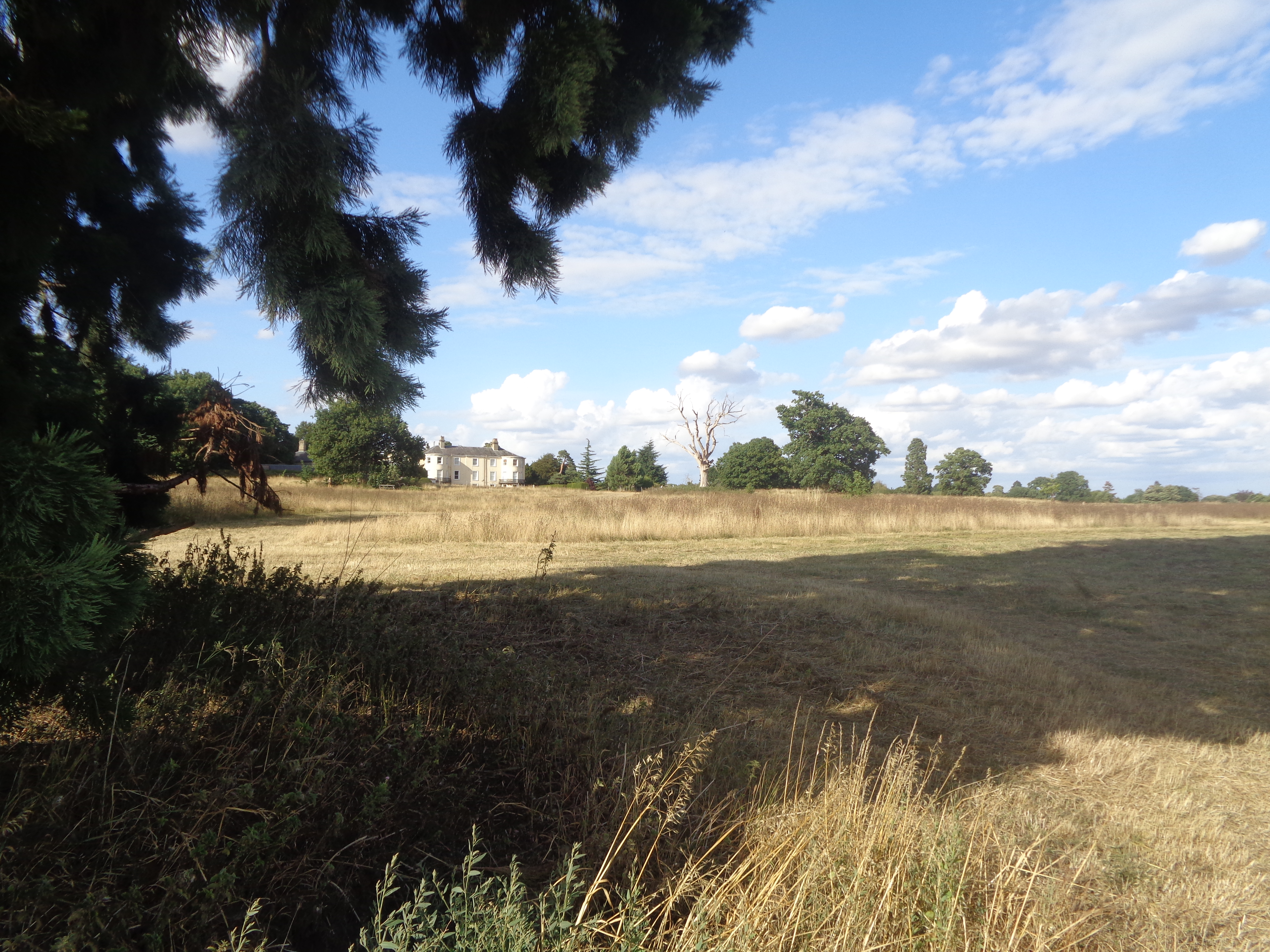
Parched Catton Park near Norwich on 20 August 2022

Much of France experienced a drought. In early August, two-thirds of the country was at crisis alert. It was reportedly been caused by the historic heatwaves that hit the country. July was reportedly the driest month in France for 60 years. By August, 100 villages had run out of drinking water. Water use was restricted in nearly all metropolitan departments of France. The Prime Minister of France Élisabeth Borne called it "the country's worst drought in history". On 5 August, she announced the creation of an inter-ministerial crisis unit.

The national corn harvest was expected to be 18.5% lower than 2021. Milk shortages were expected to follow. Conversely, salt farms benefited from the hot temperatures.

In July and August Gironde experienced numerous wild fires, see 2022 European and Mediterranean wildfires.

== Germany ==
As of August 2022, the River Rhine's water level had fallen so much that shipping was affected. The water level in Emmerich sunk to -3 cm, being 10 cm lower than the previous record from 2018. The normal water level is 239 cm. Due to the low water levels, the cost of transporting goods multiplied because ships were only able to load 25-35% of their usual freight.

On 24 August, 54% of the German area was affected by an extraordinary drought. Further 24.6% by an extreme and further 12.2% by a severe drought.

Many districts and states banned water extraction from creeks, rivers and lakes, the watering of lawns, filling of pools or cleaning cars.

By mid August, the number of forest fires in the state of Brandenburg was three times as high than in all of 2021.

== Italy ==
A state of emergency was declared in July 2022. Drought was blamed for the deaths of dozens of cows. Northern Italy experienced a drying up of important rivers like the Po.

The longest river in Italy, the Po river, dried up in the hot temperatures

== Romania ==
Water restrictions were introduced in Romania in July 2022 in preparation for drought.

== Serbia ==
Low water levels in the Danube River exposed the wrecks of dozens of German warships, sunk in late 1944 to block passage to the Soviets. The wrecks were still laden with ammunition and explosives, and presented a safety hazard.

== Spain and Portugal ==
The Iberian Peninsula experienced a drought. Water shortages were prevalent in Spain, leading to rationing.

In Portugal, the hydrological year of 2021-2022 experienced 5 heat waves and was the third driest year since 1931, after 2004-2005 and 1944–1945. 80% of the territory was in extreme and severe drought during the first nine months of 2022. The year was the hottest year since 1931. Agriculture was affected, with 2022 recording the worst production of cereals on record. The production of apples decreased by 20.9% compared to the previous year, pears decreased by 41.3%, tomatoes by 19.7%, and rice by 11.6%.

== United Kingdom ==
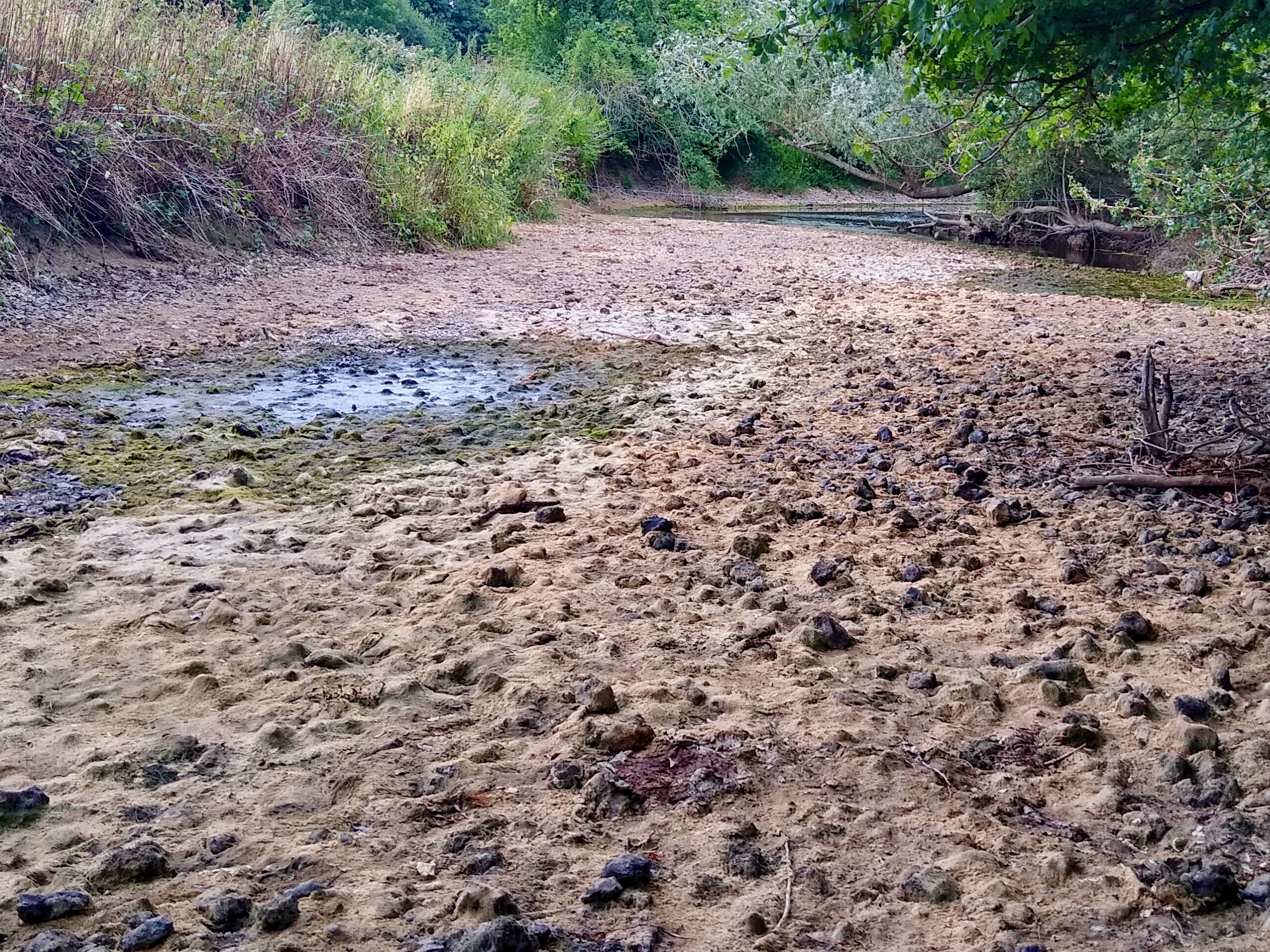
The River Mole near Leatherhead in Surrey, July 2022.

July 2022 was the driest July in England since 1935. According to Sky News, in one in seven counties, it was the driest July since records began in 1836. As a result, hosepipe bans were introduced in some parts of South East England.

Fields and heathland dried up. On 12 August, a hosepipe ban came into force by South East Water. Drought-like conditions also affected South West England.

On 12 August, a drought was declared in eight of the 14 Environment Agency areas: Devon and Cornwall, Solent and South Downs, Kent and South London, Herts and North London, East Anglia, Thames, Lincolnshire and Northamptonshire, and the East Midlands. Electricity supplies are reportedly threatened. Reservoir levels are at a 25-year low. A drought was declared in the West Midlands region on 23 August, with the Environment Agency warning it had been using groundwater resources and reserves from reservoirs in Wales to help maintain the flows of the River Severn, which supplies six million people in the area.

On 15 August, a hosepipe ban was introduced in Cornwall for the first time in 26 years. On 18 August, a hosepipe ban in South West Wales was introduced affecting Pembrokeshire and parts of Carmarthenshire. Dŵr Cymru Welsh Water said that it would be likely to last into September. Hosepipe bans were also declared by Thames Water. On 19 August, a drought was declared in north Ceredigion, Teifi, Pembrokeshire, Carmarthen, Swansea, Llanelli, Neath Port Talbot and Bridgend. The River Black Bourn in Suffolk was reportedly "near dead".

On 30 August, a drought was declared in South West England, covering Bristol, Somerset, South Gloucestershire, Dorset and parts of Wiltshire.

Parts of Yorkshire experienced their driest period on record and emergency pipes were laid. In December 2022, Yorkshire Water lifted the hosepipe ban after three months.

The Cornwall hosepipe ban continued to be active into 2023, and was extended to cover large parts of Devon on 25 April 2023. This was done in an attempt to replenish water levels at the Roadford Reservoir ahead of that year's summer.

== See also ==
- Climate change in Europe
- 1540 European drought
- 2022 heat waves
- 2022 European heat waves
- 2023 European drought
- 2020–2023 North American drought
