= Fuente de Piedra Lagoon =

Wetland in Andalusia, Spain

Coordinates: 37.107°N 4.771°W

Designations

Ramsar Wetland
- Official name: Laguna de Fuente de Piedra
- Designated: 8 August 1983
- Reference no.: 276

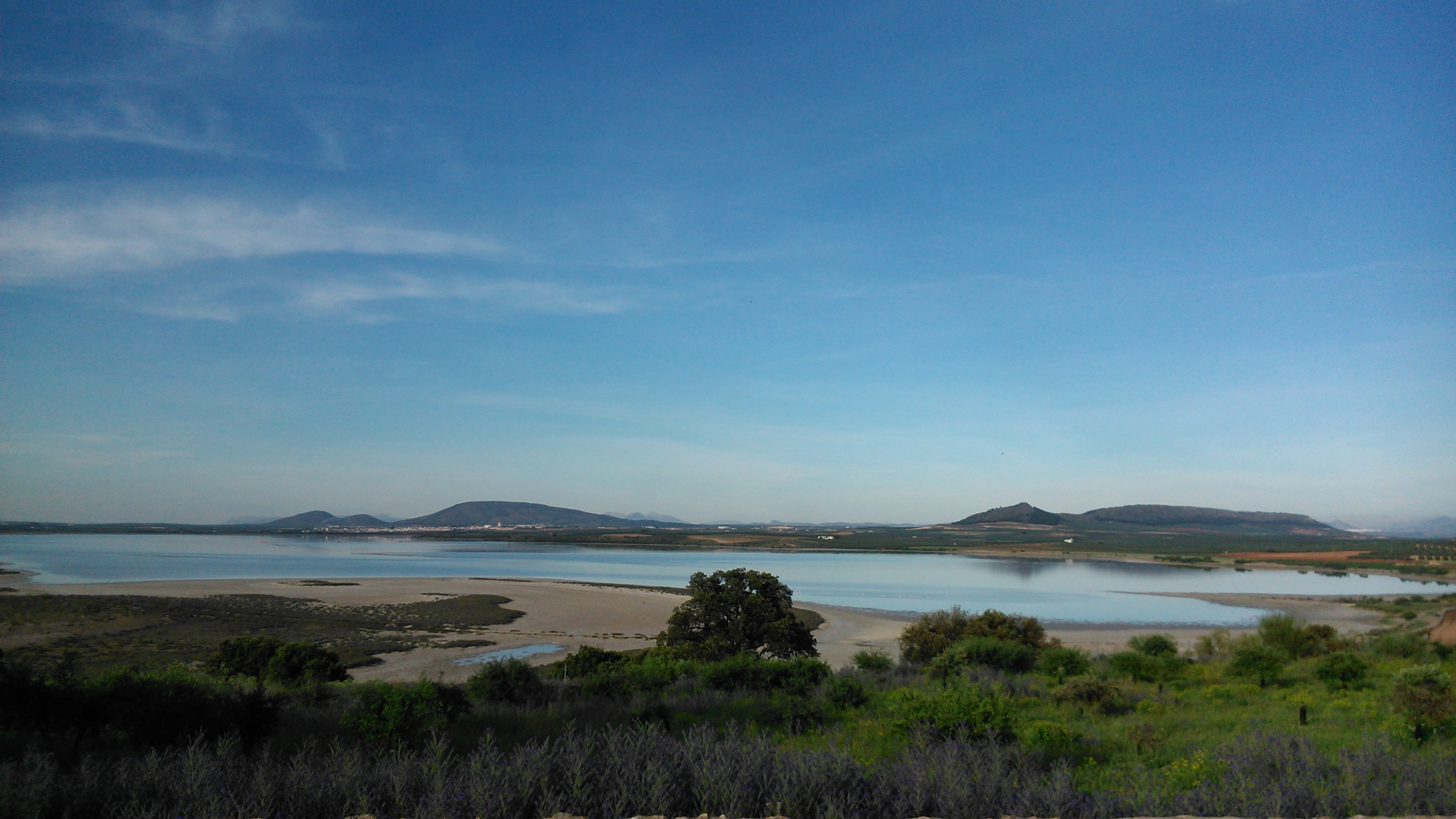
View of the Fuente de Piedra Lagoon, 2015.

Fuente de Piedra Lagoon is a wetland located in the Málaga province of Spain. It is used by the greater flamingo for its annual reproduction cycle, constituting the largest colony on the Iberian Peninsula of this bird. The lagoon is fed by underwater springs that pass through mineral salt deposits, so the lagoon is saline - indeed salt was harvested until recently.

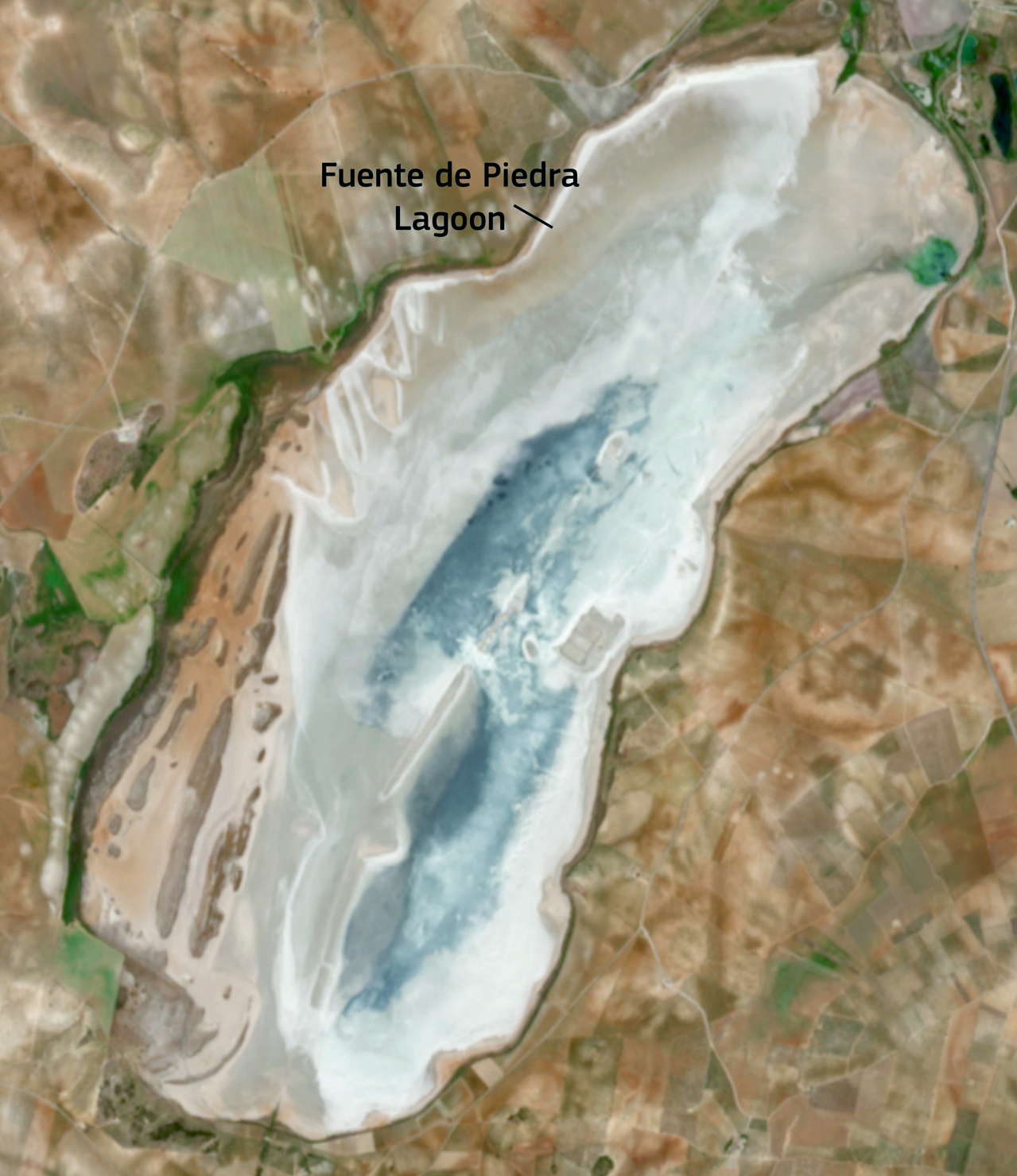
The dry lagoon in 2023, caused by a severe heat wave.

The lagoon covers an area of 13 square kilometres (5.0 sq mi). It is elliptical in shape. Its major axis is 6.8 kilometres (4.2 mi) and the minor one is 2.5 kilometres (1.6 mi). However it is very shallow; in a good year it is less than 1 metre (3 ft 3 in) deep at its deepest point.

Evaporation is a major factor for the lagoon. The flamingos need a certain amount of water to breed and will desert the eggs if the lagoon dries out too soon.

In April 2023, due to drought, the lake dried up and turned into a salt pan, interrupting the flamingos breeding cycle and forcing them to leave the lake earlier than usual.
