= Vilice =

- Municipality
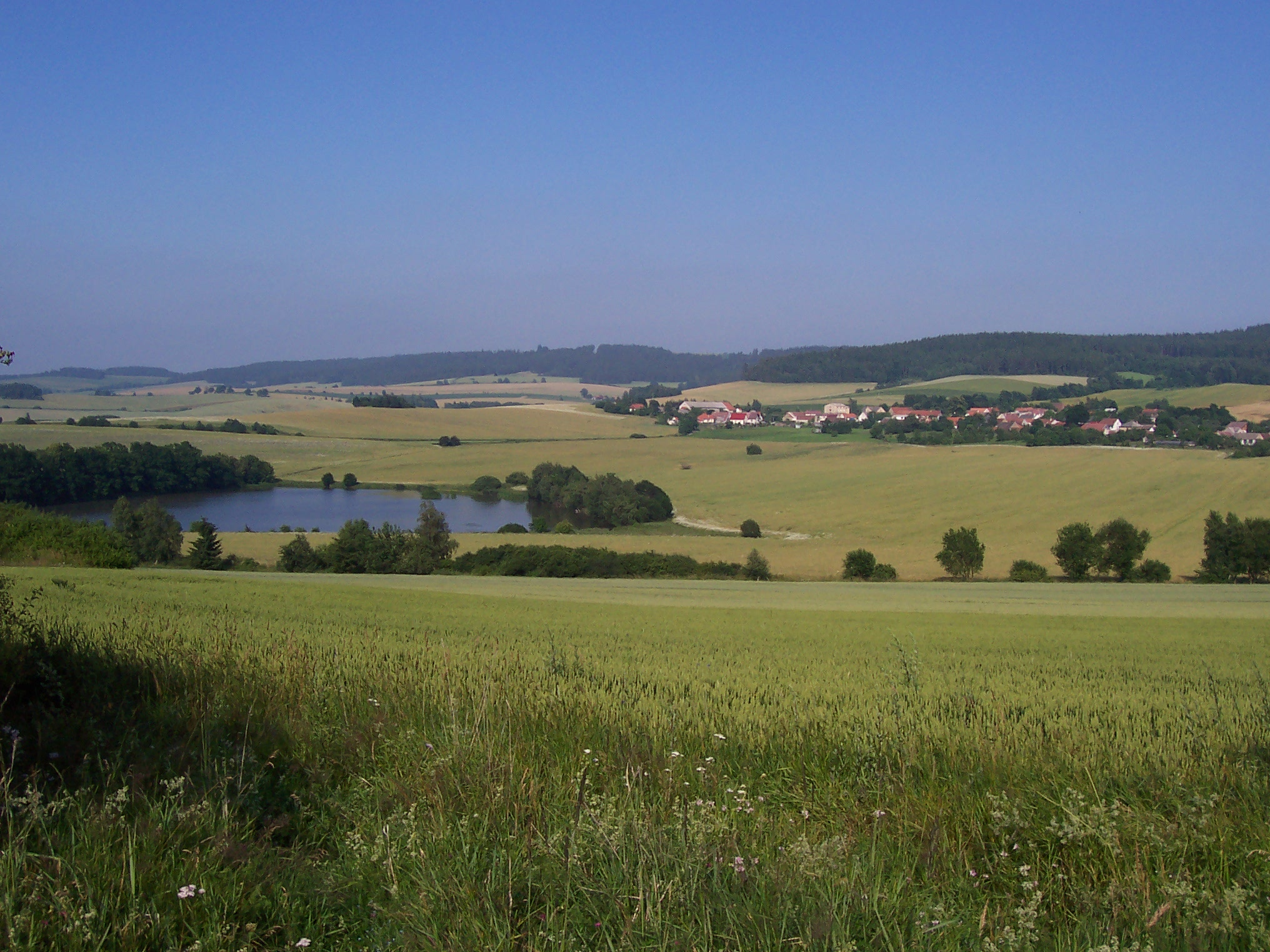
- Vilice and the fishpond Velký Vilický rybník

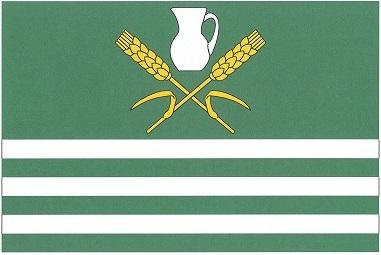
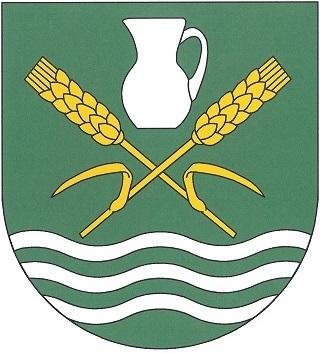
- Flag Coat of arms

- Location in the Czech Republic
- Coordinates: 49°33′52″N 14°51′52″E
- Country: Czech Republic
- Region: South Bohemian
- District: Tábor
- First mentioned: 1377

Area
  - Total: 7.10 km^{2} (2.74 sq mi)
- Elevation: 519 m (1,703 ft)

Population (2026-01-01)
  - Total: 151
  - Density: 21.3/km^{2} (55.1/sq mi)
- Time zone: UTC+1 (CET)
  - Summer (DST): UTC+2 (CEST)
- Postal code: 391 43
- Website: www.vilice.cz

Vilice is a municipality and village in Tábor District in the South Bohemian Region of the Czech Republic. It has about 200 inhabitants.

Vilice lies approximately 23 kilometres (14 mi) north-east of Tábor, 72 km (45 mi) north-east of České Budějovice, and 67 km (42 mi) south-east of Prague.

== Administrative division ==
Vilice consists of two municipal parts (in brackets population according to the 2021 census):

- Vilice (98)
- Hrnčíře (36)

== Demographics ==
Historical population
Year	Pop.	±%
1869	558	—
1880	547	−2.0%
1890	557	+1.8%
1900	484	−13.1%
1910	517	+6.8%
1921	515	−0.4%
1930	429	−16.7%
1950	312	−27.3%
1961	311	−0.3%
1970	281	−9.6%
1980	242	−13.9%
1991	206	−14.9%
2001	182	−11.7%
2011	158	−13.2%
2021	134	−15.2%
Source: Censuses
