= Torremocha del Campo =

Torremocha del Campo, Spain
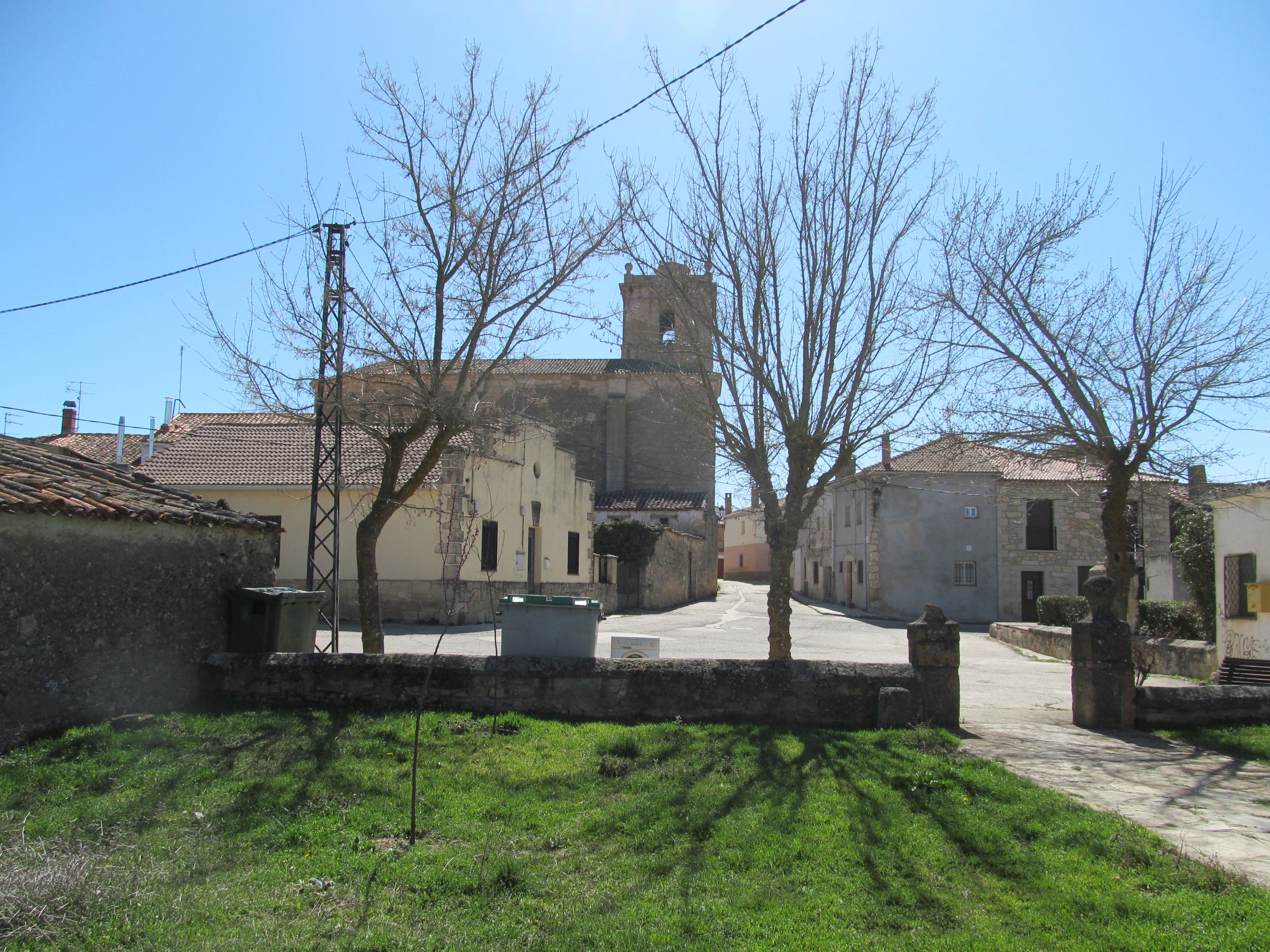

- Coat of arms

- Location within Province of Guadalajara Location within Castilla-La Mancha Location within Spain
- Coordinates: 40°58′45″N 2°37′03″W
- Country: Spain
- Autonomous community: Castile-La Mancha
- Province: Guadalajara
- Municipality: Torremocha del Campo

Area
  - Total: 141 km^{2} (54 sq mi)

Population (2025-01-01)
  - Total: 193
  - Density: 1.37/km^{2} (3.55/sq mi)
- Time zone: UTC+1 (CET)
  - Summer (DST): UTC+2 (CEST)

Torremocha del Campo is a municipality located in the province of Guadalajara, Castile-La Mancha, Spain. According to the 2004 census (INE), the municipality has a population of 261 inhabitants.
