= Ravilloles =

Commune in Bourgogne-Franche-Comté, France

- Commune
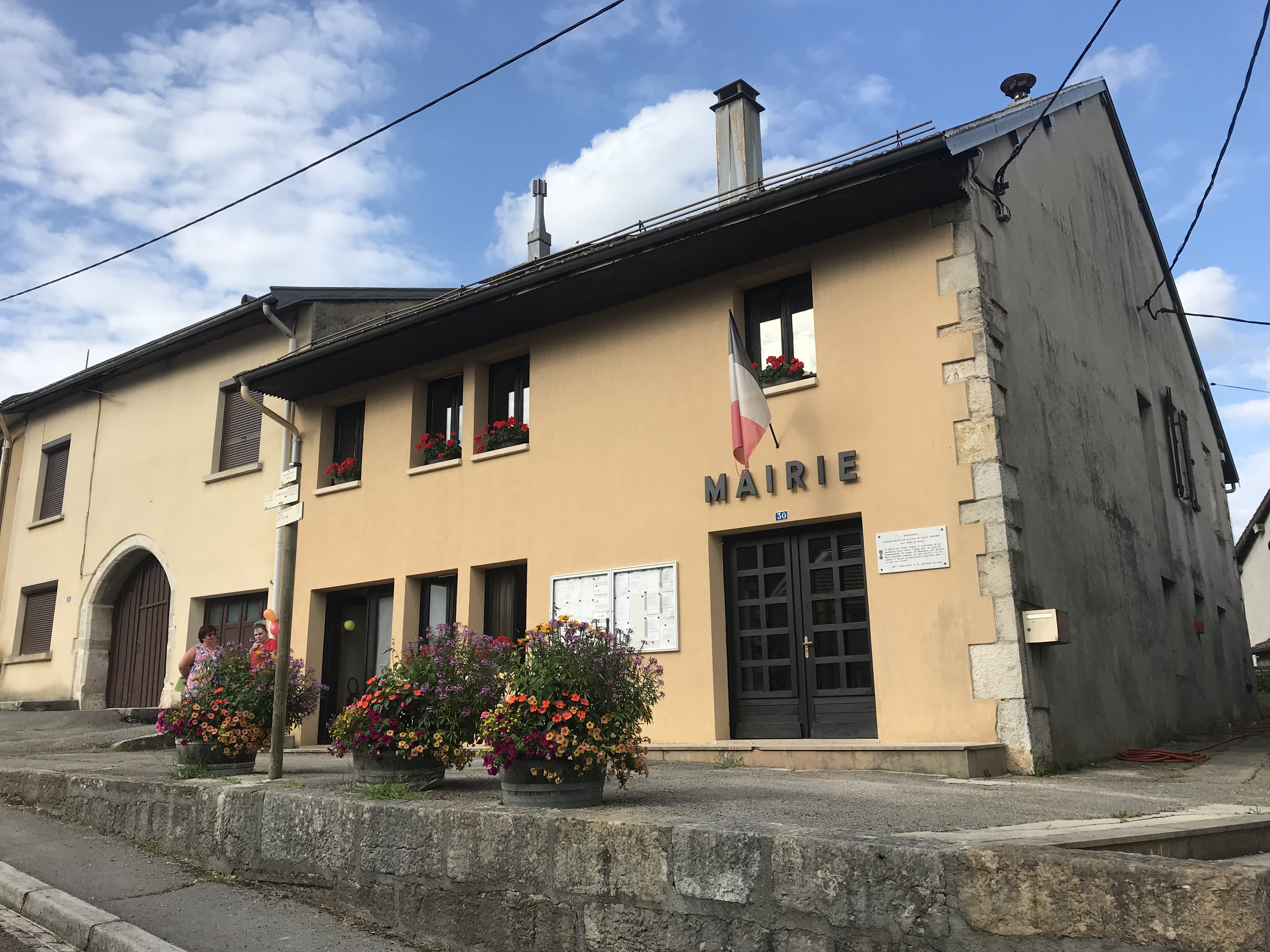
- The town hall in Ravilloles

- Coat of arms
- Location of Ravilloles
- Location within France Location within Bourgogne-Franche-Comté
- Coordinates: 46°25′35″N 5°48′11″E
- Country: France
- Region: Bourgogne-Franche-Comté
- Department: Jura
- Arrondissement: Saint-Claude
- Canton: Saint-Claude

Government
  - Mayor (2020–2026): Roger Morel-Fourrier
- Area^{1}: 7.79 km^{2} (3.01 sq mi)
- Highest elevation: 980 m (3,220 ft)
- Lowest elevation: 590 m (1,940 ft)
- Population (2023): 434
  - Density: 55.7/km^{2} (144/sq mi)
- Time zone: UTC+01:00 (CET)
  - Summer (DST): UTC+02:00 (CEST)
- INSEE/Postal code: 39453 /39170
- ^{1} French Land Register data, which excludes lakes, ponds, glaciers > 1 km^{2} (0.386 sq mi or 247 acres) and river estuaries.

Ravilloles (French pronunciation: [ʁavijɔl]) is a commune in the Jura department in the region of Bourgogne-Franche-Comté in eastern France.

== Population ==
Historical population
Year	Pop.	±% p.a.
1968	294	—
1975	330	+1.66%
1982	332	+0.09%
1990	382	+1.77%
1999	404	+0.62%
2007	476	+2.07%
2012	511	+1.43%
2017	476	−1.41%
2023	434	−1.53%
Source: INSEE

== See also ==
- Communes of the Jura department
