= Dobliče =

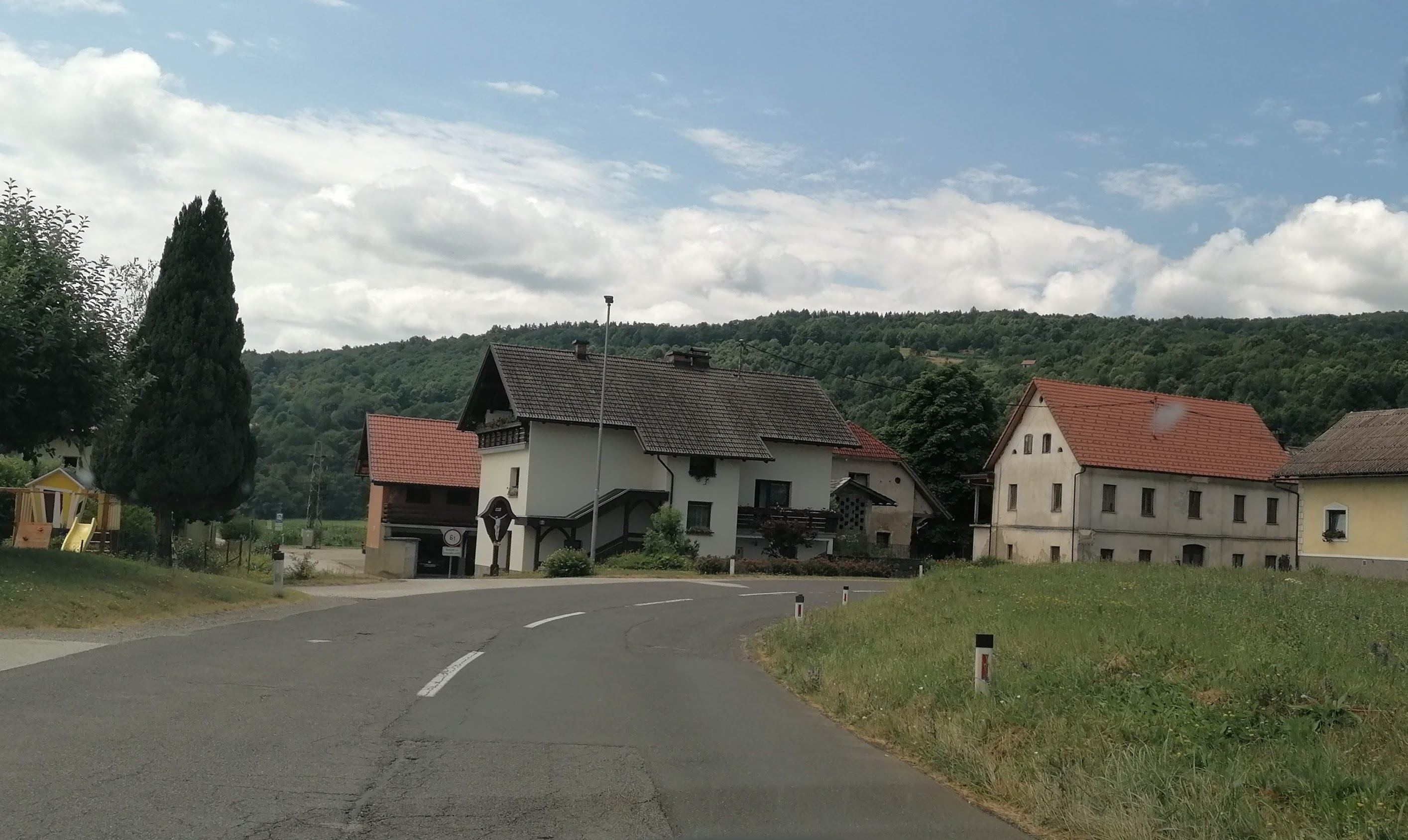

- Location in Slovenia
- Coordinates: 45°33′31.74″N 15°8′41.47″E
- Country: Slovenia
- Traditional region: White Carniola
- Statistical region: Southeast Slovenia
- Municipality: Črnomelj

Area
  - Total: 1.07 km^{2} (0.41 sq mi)
- Elevation: 153.1 m (502 ft)

Population (2020)
  - Total: 174
  - Density: 163/km^{2} (421/sq mi)
- Postal code: 8340

Dobliče (pronounced [dɔˈbliːtʃɛ]; German: Döblitsch or Doblitsche) is a village in the Municipality of Črnomelj in the White Carniola area of southeastern Slovenia. The area is part of the traditional region of Lower Carniola and is now included in the Southeast Slovenia Statistical Region.

== Name ==
Dobliče was first attested in written sources in 1354 as Doblich (and as zu der Aychen in 1397, Döblikh in 1457, and Aychen in 1463). The German name Aychen (based on Middle High German eich 'oak') is probably a pseudo-etymological translation of the Slovene name, which appears to contain the root dob 'pedunculate oak'. The name Dobliče is believed to actually derive from *Dobl(')iťi, a plural form derived from the adjective *dobľь 'strong', probably a nickname referring to an early inhabitant of the settlement. Dobliče was known as Döblitsch or Doblitsche in German.

== Church ==
The local church is dedicated to John the Evangelist (Slovene: sveti Janez) and belongs to the Parish of Črnomelj. It was built in 1843 in the Baroque style, replacing an earlier building, first mentioned in written documents dating to 1354.

== Notable people ==
Notable people that were born or lived in Dobliče include:

- John Vertin (1844–1899), Bishop of Saulte Saint Marie and Marquette, Michigan
