= Gamvik =

Gamvik or Gamvika may refer to:

== Places ==
- Gamvik Municipality, a municipality in Finnmark county, Norway
- Gamvik (village), a village in Gamvik Municipality in Finnmark county, Norway
- Gamvik Church, a church in Gamvik Municipality in Finnmark county, Norway
- Gamvik Airport, an inactive airport in Gamvik Municipality in Finnmark county, Norway
