= Store Kamøya =

Store Kamøya or Store Kamøy (meaning "big" Kamøya) may refer to the following places in Norway:

- Store Kamøy, Gamvik, an island in Gamvik Municipality, Finnmark county
- Store Kamøya, Hammerfest, an island in Hammerfest Municipality, Finnmark county
- Storkamøya, an island in Harstad Municipality, Troms county
- Store Kamøya, Nordkapp, an island in Nordkapp Municipality, Finnmark county

== See also ==
- Lille Kamøya (disambiguation)
