= Gamvik Airport =

Gamvik Airport Gamvik flyplass
- IATA: none; ICAO: none

Summary
- Airport type: Public
- Serves: Gamvik
- Location: Gamvik Municipality, Norway
- Elevation AMSL: 24 m / 79 ft
- Coordinates: 71°04′46″N 028°13′32″E

Map
- Location in Norway

Runways
Direction	Length		Surface
Direction	m	ft	Surface
	800	2,600	Gravel

Gamvik Airport (Norwegian: Gamvik flyplass) is a disused general aviation airport located at Slettnes, just outside the village of Gamvik in Gamvik Municipality in Finnmark county, Norway.

== History ==
A Finnmark County Municipality-appointed committee which in published a report in 1966 recommending Mehamn as one of six regional airports in Finnmark. As Finnmark had lowest priority on the state-financed construction of regional airports, Norving took initiative to start construction of smaller and simpler airfields in select communities, including Gamvik. The airline also looked into two other locations on Nordkinnhalvøya: Mehamn and Kjøllefjord. The main motivation for an airport was the difficulties of transporting patients to the hospital. Until a quay was built in the village of Gamvik in 1971, the Hurtigruten ships anchored up and patients had to be transported to the ship by boat before venturing on the voyage to the hospital.

The airline therefore contacted Gamvik Municipality in December 1969 and proposed that an airfield be built within a year, which it could operate with its Britten-Norman Islander aircraft. When the Civil Aviation Administration (CAA) started planning an airport for the area, it considered both Kjøllefjord, Mehamn, and Gamvik as locations for the regional airport. In early 1971, Norving and local interested parties started looking for a suitable site in the village of Gamvik. A committee was created for the task, which initiated a cooperation with the municipality. It was possible to take advantage of the weather station and radio navigation equipment at Slettnes Lighthouse. A gravel runway was estimated to cost 76,000 kr, in addition to simple runway lights.

Initially the CAA supported Gamvik as a location for a regional airport, in part because of the lower investment costs. The municipal council of Gamvik Municipality voted instead to choose the municipal center of Mehamn as the site of the airport, about 20 kilometers (12 mi) from the village of Gamvik. The Gamvik chapter of the Norwegian Red Cross Search and Rescue Corps started fund-raising for Gamvik to build its own airport. It applied to the municipality, but no public funds were granted. Norving was the main contributor, funding 53,000 kr. The population of Gamvik had between 400 and 500 people donate 60,000 kr. A new committee was established and they started construction after the spring thaw started in June 1971. Within five weeks 600 meters (2,000 ft) of runway had been built. The airport opened on 29 August.

The airfield was used for Norving's air ambulance and air taxi service, both of which flew the Britten-Norman Islander, a light utility aircraft. The operation of the airport was carried out as a cooperation between Gamvik Search and Rescue Corps and Norving. Yngvar Svendsen, the airline's contact person in Gamvik, was responsible for operations including the radio. For the first ten months he worked free of charge. In 1972, Norving applied to establish a scheduled taxi route from Gamvik. Mehamn Airport opened in 1974 along with a road between Gamvik and Mehamn that was usable year-round, which resulted in Gamvik Airport being reduced to an emergency airport.

== Facilities ==
The airport was located at Slettnes outside Gamvik. The airport had an 800-by-30-meter (2,625 by 98 ft) gravel runway. Travel distance to Mehamn was 20 minutes and to Kjøllefjord one hour.
