= Lille Kamøya =

Lille Kamøya (meaning "little" Kamøya) may refer to the following places in Norway:

- Lille Kamøya, Gamvik, an island in Gamvik Municipality, Finnmark county
- Lille Kamøya, Hammerfest, an island in Hammerfest municipality, Finnmark county
- Lille Kamøya, Nordkapp, an island in Nordkapp municipality, Finnmark county

== See also ==
- Store Kamøya (disambiguation)
