= Mehamn Church =

- Mehamn kirke
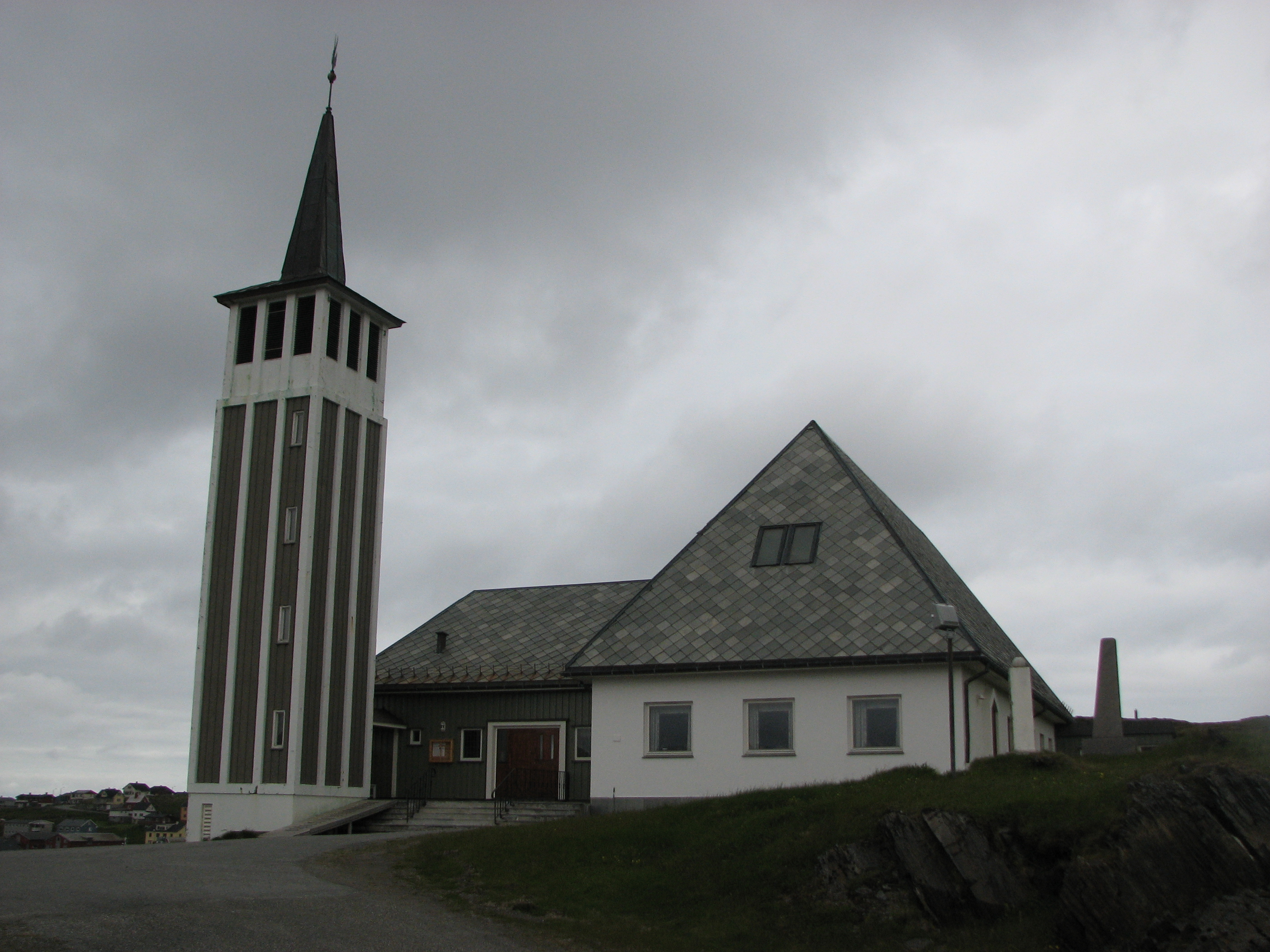
- View of the church
- Mehamn Church
- 71.036315°N 27.8522113°E
- Location: Gamvik Municipality, Finnmark
- Country: Norway
- Denomination: Church of Norway
- Churchmanship: Evangelical Lutheran

History
- Status: Parish church
- Founded: 1965
- Consecrated: 1965

Architecture
- Functional status: Active
- Architect: Hans Magnus
- Architectural type: Long church
- Completed: 1965 (61 years ago)

Specifications
- Capacity: 200
- Materials: Concrete

Administration
- Diocese: Nord-Hålogaland
- Deanery: Hammerfest prosti
- Parish: Gamvik
- Norwegian Cultural Heritage Site
- Type: Church
- Status: Not protected
- ID: 84929

Mehamn Church (Norwegian: Mehamn kirke) is a parish church of the Church of Norway in Gamvik Municipality in Finnmark county, Norway. It is located in the village of Mehamn. It is one of the churches for the Gamvik parish which is part of the Hammerfest prosti (deanery) in the Diocese of Nord-Hålogaland. The white, concrete church was built in a long church style in 1965 using plans drawn up by the architect Hans Magnus. The church seats about 200 people.

== Media gallery ==
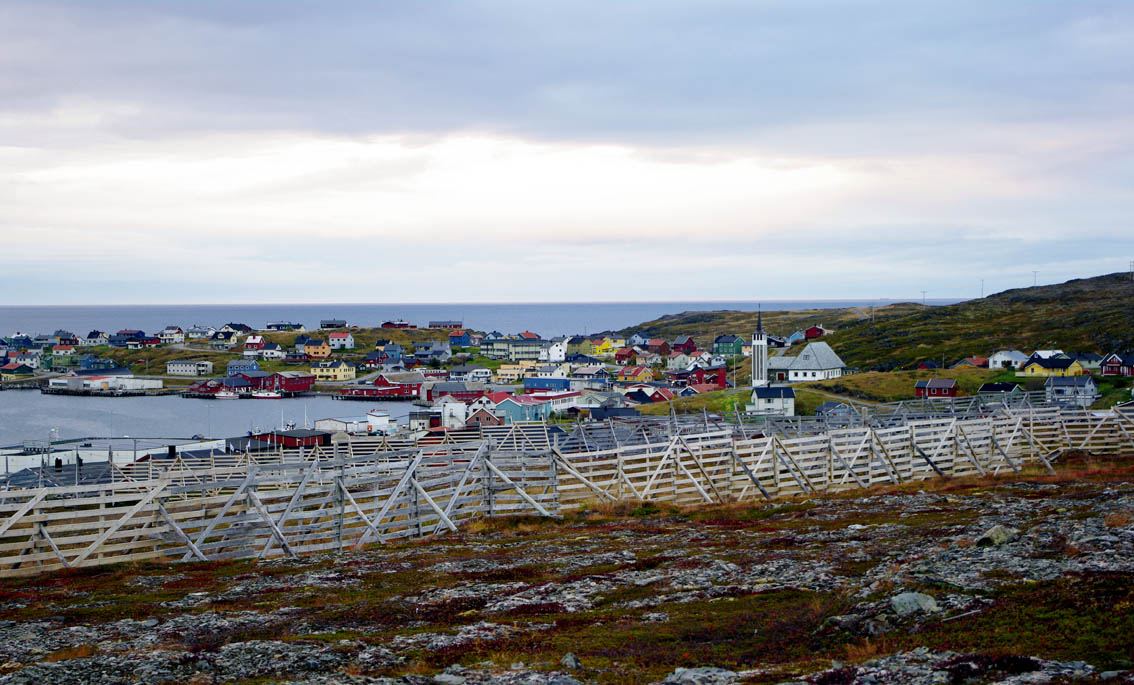

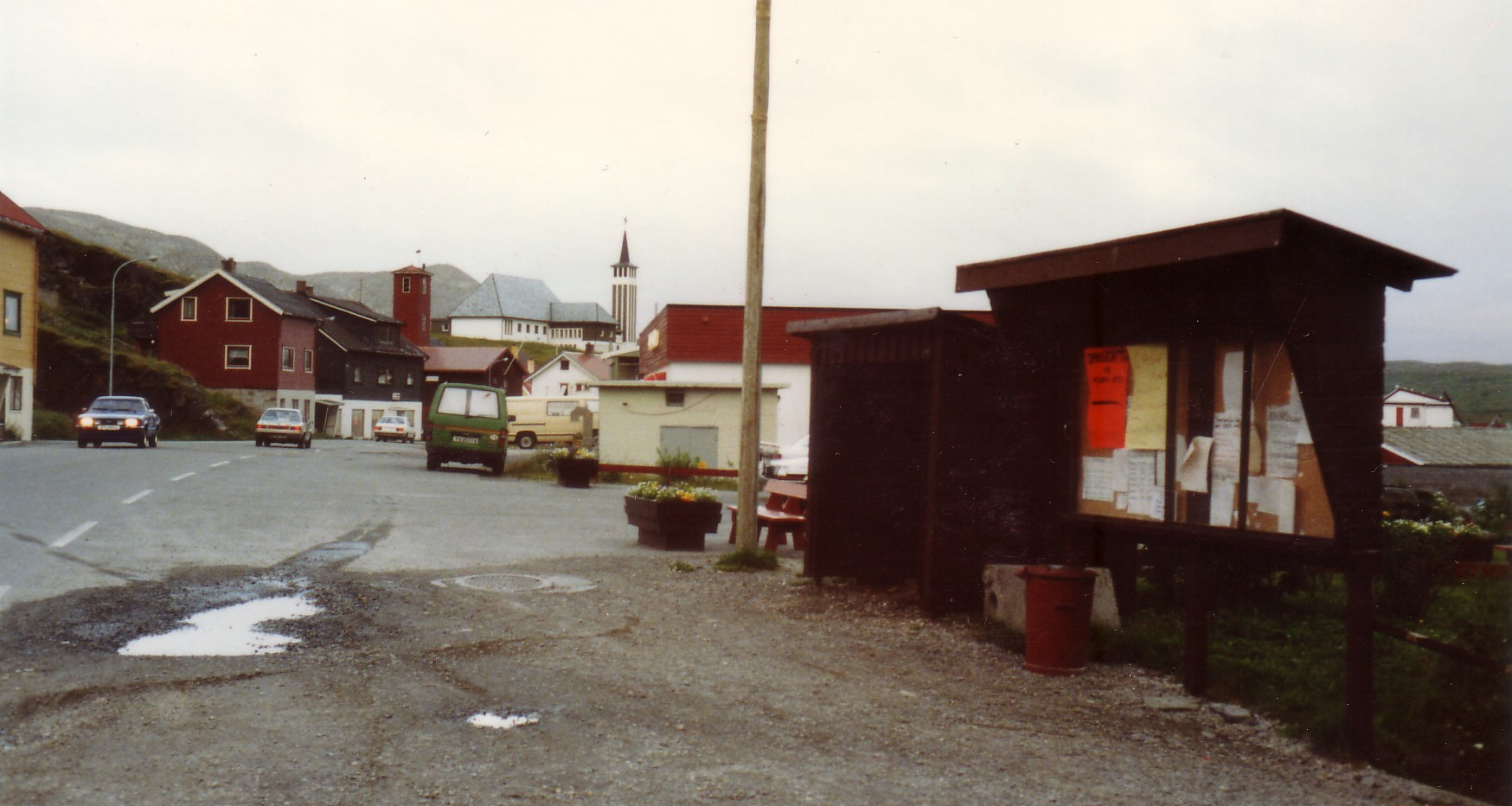

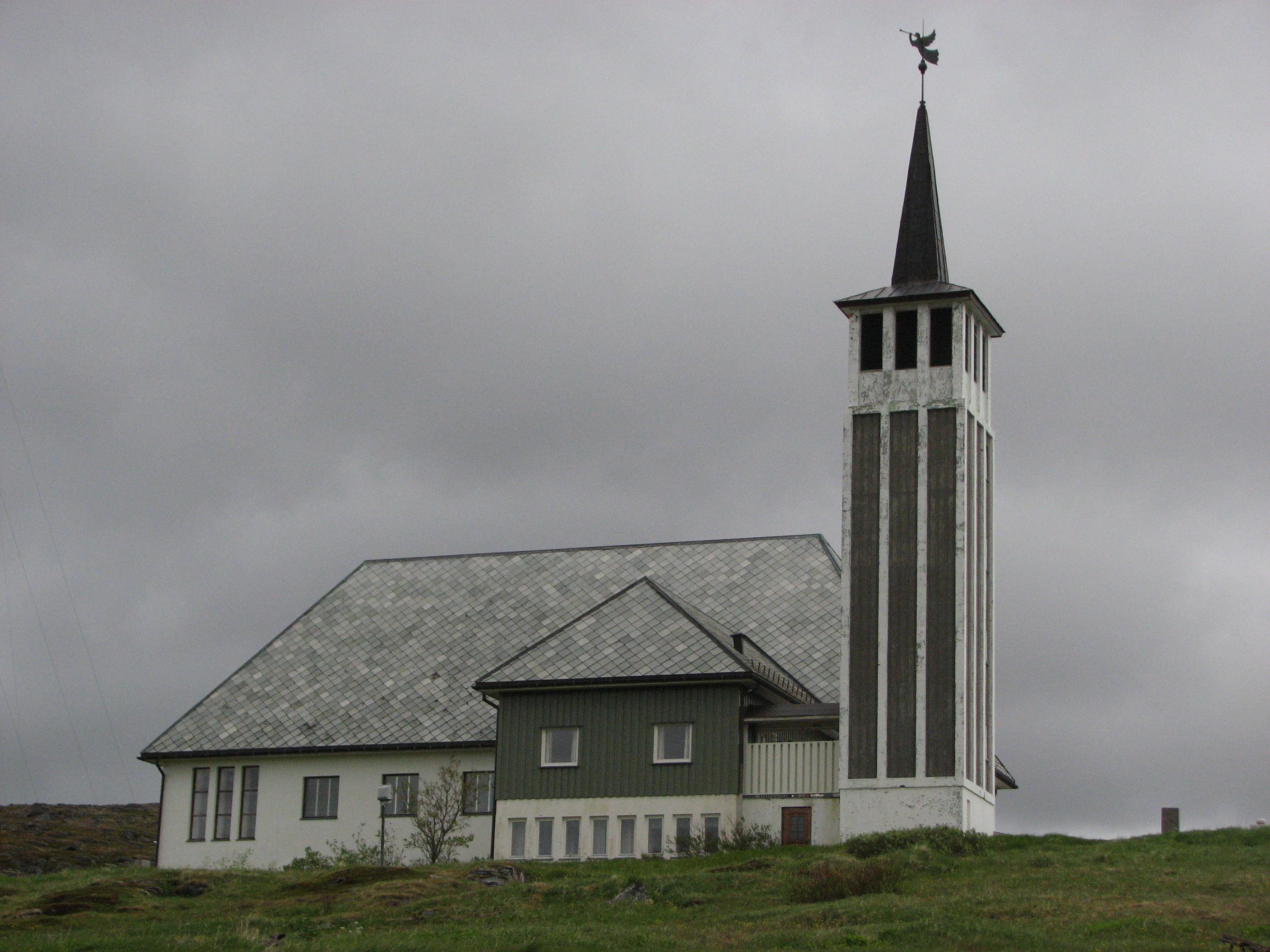

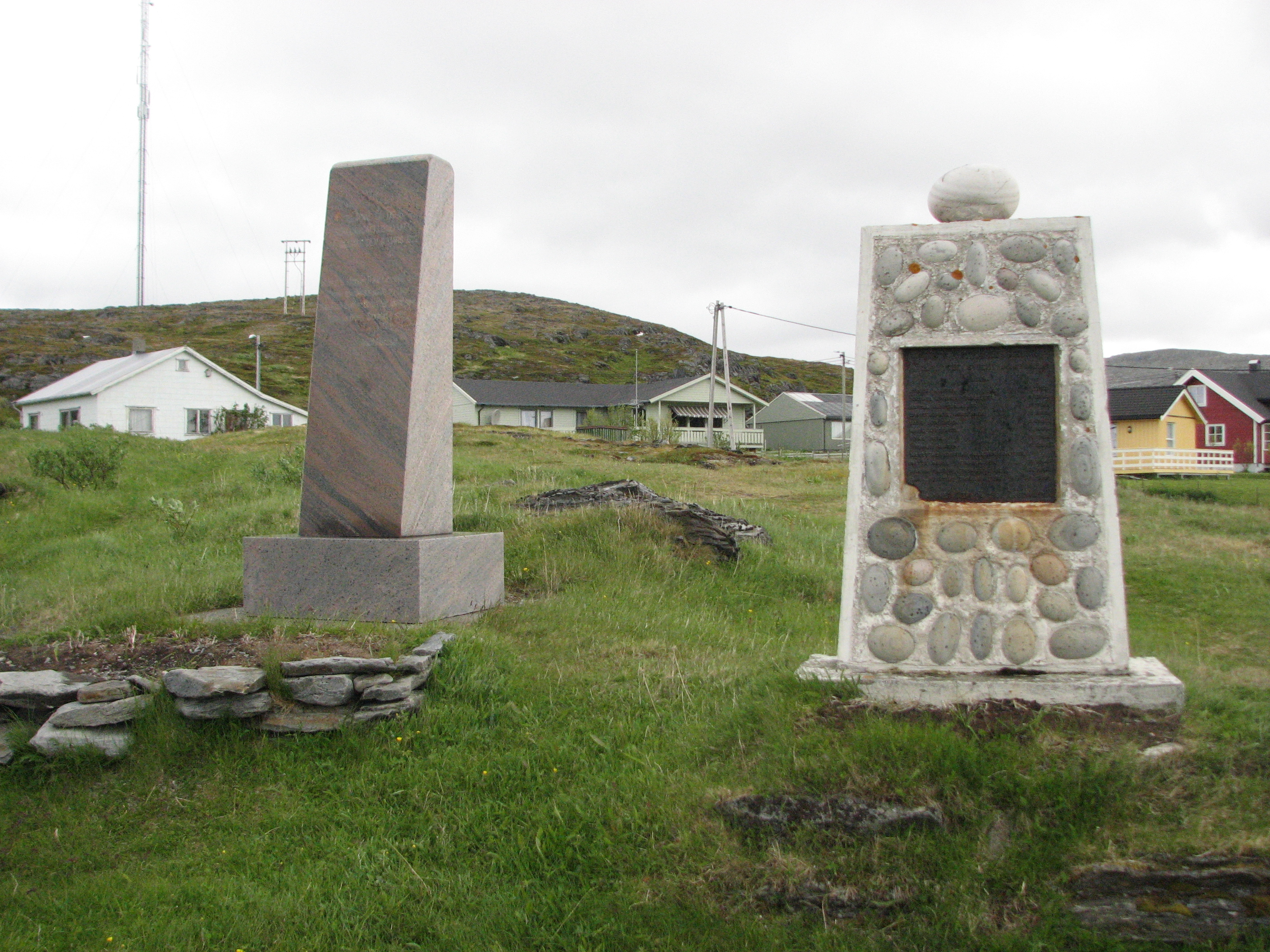

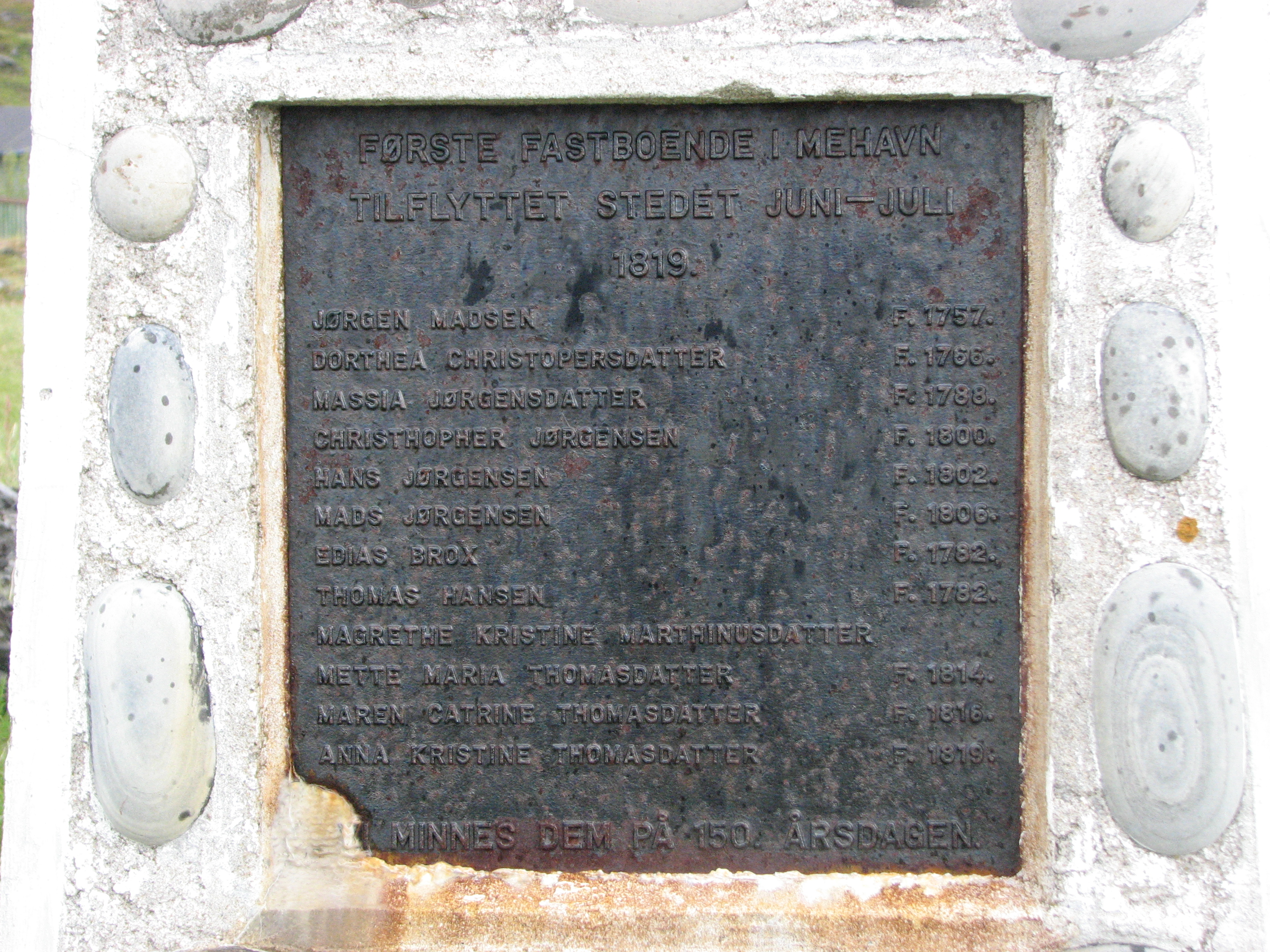

== See also ==
- List of churches in Nord-Hålogaland
