= Tor Henriksen =

Norwegian politician (1933–2017)

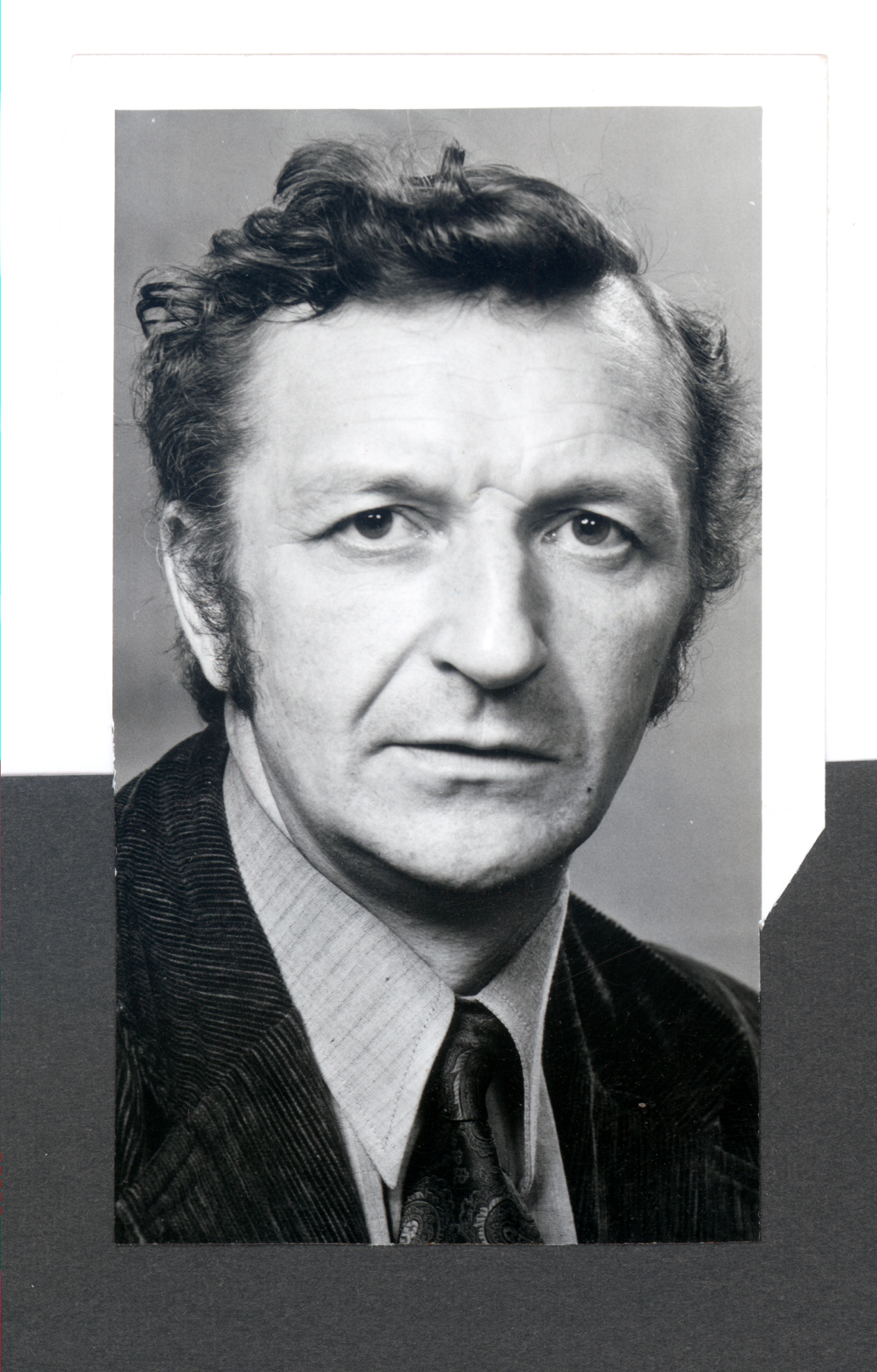
- Born: 16 May 1933; Gamvik, Norway
- Died: 1 November 2017 (aged 84)
- Education: Telegrapher

Tor Henriksen (16 May 1933 – 1 November 2017) was a Norwegian politician for the Socialist Left Party.

He was born in Gamvik to Karl Johan Henriksen and Anna Isaksen. After finishing secondary education, he spent his entire career in Televerket, mostly stationed in Hammerfest. He was also active in his trade union.

Henriksen did serve briefly in Berlevåg municipal council from 1967 to 1968, then in Hammerfest municipal council from 1971 to 1975. He was elected representative to the Storting from the constituency Finnmark for the period 1973–1977.

Henriksen also chaired Finnmark Socialist People's Party from 1963 to 1966 and Hammerfest Socialist People's Party from 1972 to 1973, when the Socialist People's Party merged to form the Socialist Left Party.
