= Finnkongkeila =

- Abandoned village
- Interactive map of Finnkongkeila
- Location within Finnmark Location within Norway
- Coordinates: 70°54′38″N 28°27′11″E
- Country: Norway
- Region: Northern Norway
- County: Finnmark
- District: Øst-Finnmark
- Municipality: Gamvik Municipality
- Elevation: 43 m (141 ft)
- Time zone: UTC+01:00 (CET)
  - Summer (DST): UTC+02:00 (CEST)

Finnkongkeila is an abandoned fishing village in Gamvik Municipality in Finnmark county, Norway. The village is located on the eastern part of the Nordkinn Peninsula on the shores of the Tanafjorden. The village was abandoned in 1944 after the burning of the village during the German withdrawal from Finnmark during their retreat near the end of World War II. The village was not rebuilt after the war because of its remote location with no road access.

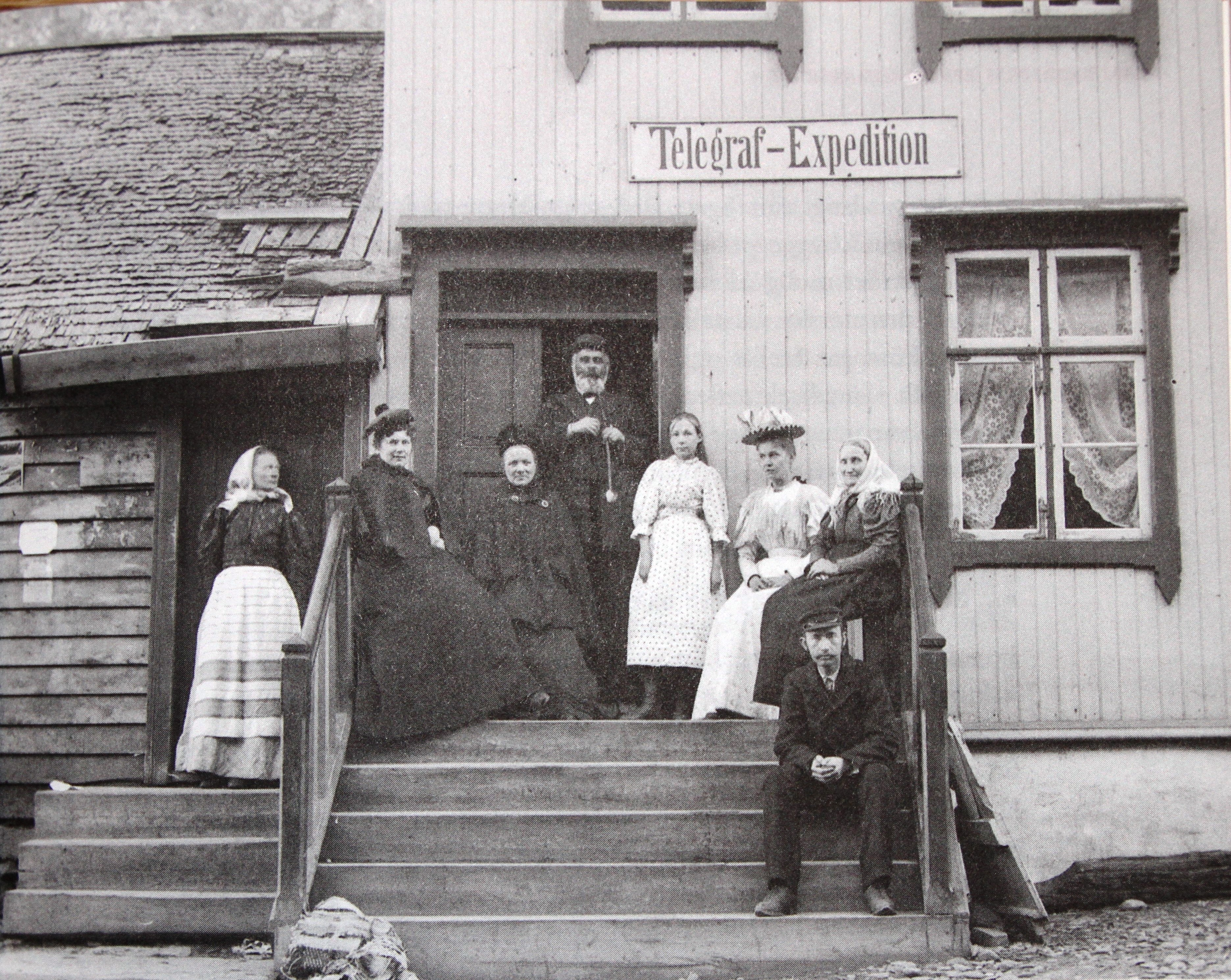
Finnkongkeila, ca. 1890s
