= Gamvik (village) =

- Village
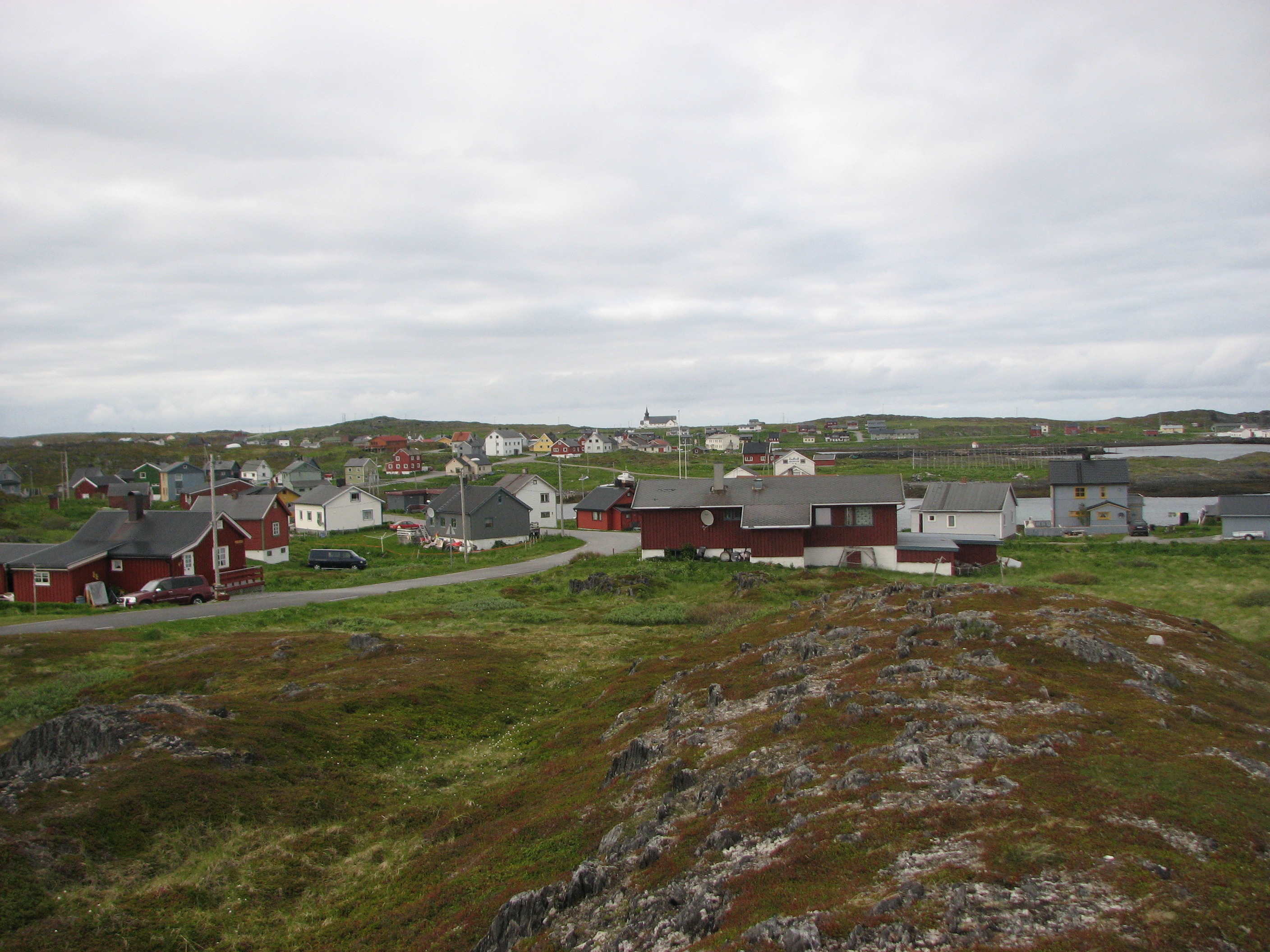
- View of the village (looking north)
- Interactive map of Gamvik
- Location within Finnmark Location within Norway
- Coordinates: 71°03′49″N 28°14′48″E
- Country: Norway
- Region: Northern Norway
- County: Finnmark
- District: Øst-Finnmark
- Municipality: Gamvik Municipality

Area
  - Total: 0.24 km^{2} (0.093 sq mi)
- Elevation: 5 m (16 ft)

Population (2023)
  - Total: 218
  - Density: 908/km^{2} (2,350/sq mi)
- Time zone: UTC+01:00 (CET)
  - Summer (DST): UTC+02:00 (CEST)
- Post Code: 9775 Gamvik

Gamvik is a fishing village in Gamvik Municipality in Finnmark county, Norway. The village is located on the northern shore of the Nordkinn Peninsula, along the Barents Sea. The village is the second largest settlement in Gamvik municipality, after the municipal centre of Mehamn which is located about 16 kilometres (9.9 mi) to the west. Gamvik is home to the Gamvik Museum and Gamvik Church. The village is an old church site with churches located there since at least the 1850s. The 0.24-square-kilometre (59-acre) village has a population (2023) of 218 and a population density of 908 inhabitants per square kilometre (2,350/sq mi).

The village was historically only accessible by boat, but due to the poor harbor conditions, the daily Hurtigruten steamers had to drop anchor a little way out from the shore and then smaller boats had to ferry people into the village. In the 1970s, Gamvik Airport was built and in the 1980s, Norwegian County Road 888 was constructed from Lebesby through Mehamn and on to Gamvik.

While Grense Jakobselv is the settlement furthest away from the capital Oslo, if international routes (through Sweden and Finland) are included, Gamvik is the place in Norway with the longest road distance from Oslo: 2,040 kilometres (1,270 mi).

Slettnes Lighthouse is located about 3 kilometres (1.9 mi) north of the village, and it is the northernmost mainland lighthouse in Norway. Slettnes nature reserve is also located north of the village and it is an important breeding ground for a large number of bird species, and it is home to the second largest colony of parasitic jaegers. The remains of the old Gamvik Airport as well as some ruins of World War II fortifications are found to the north of the village.

== History ==
In June 1972, construction started for a land-side terminal and running a SOSUS cable into the sea. The SOSUS station was one of more than twenty worldwide.

== Media gallery ==
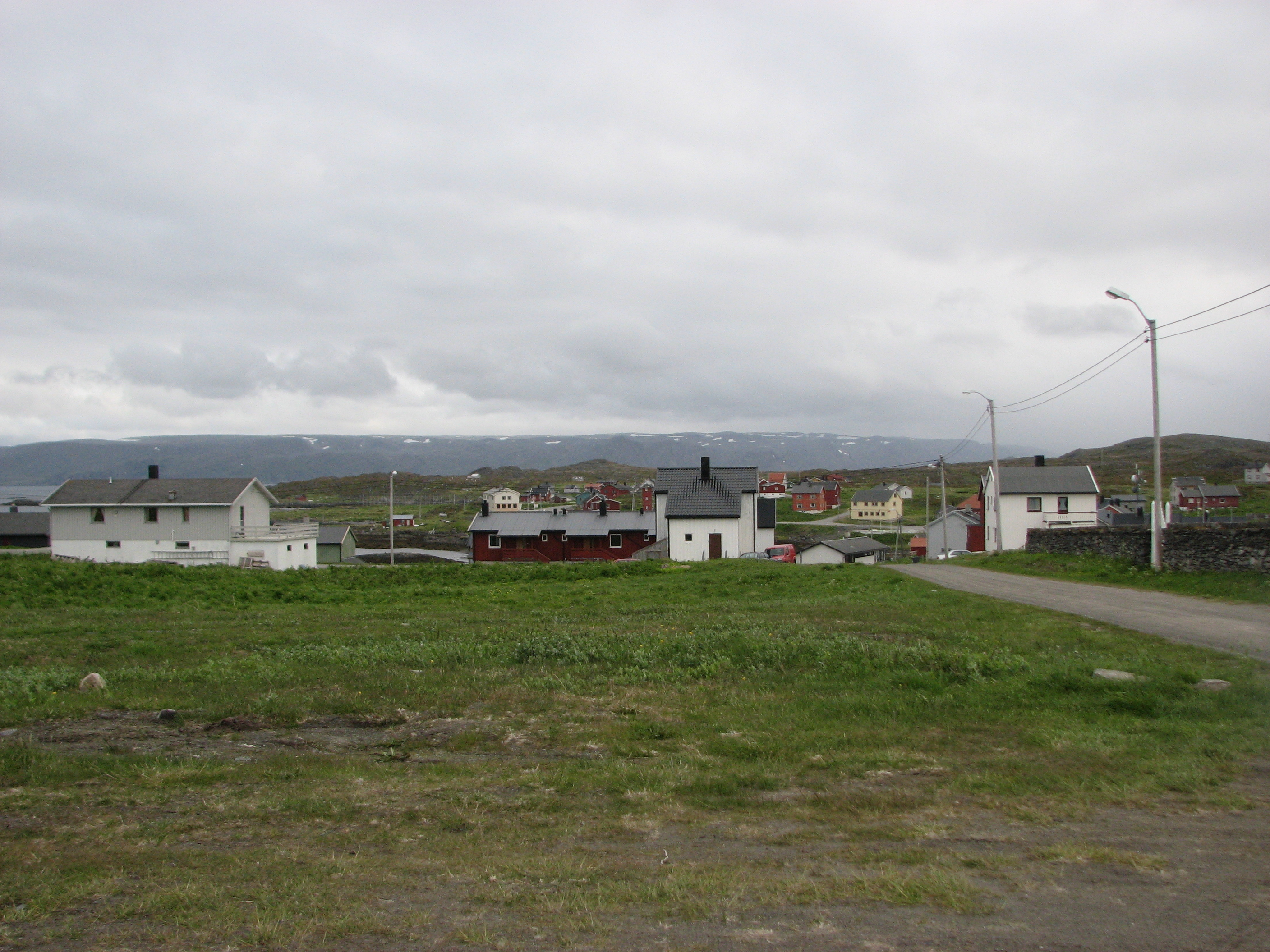
View of the village

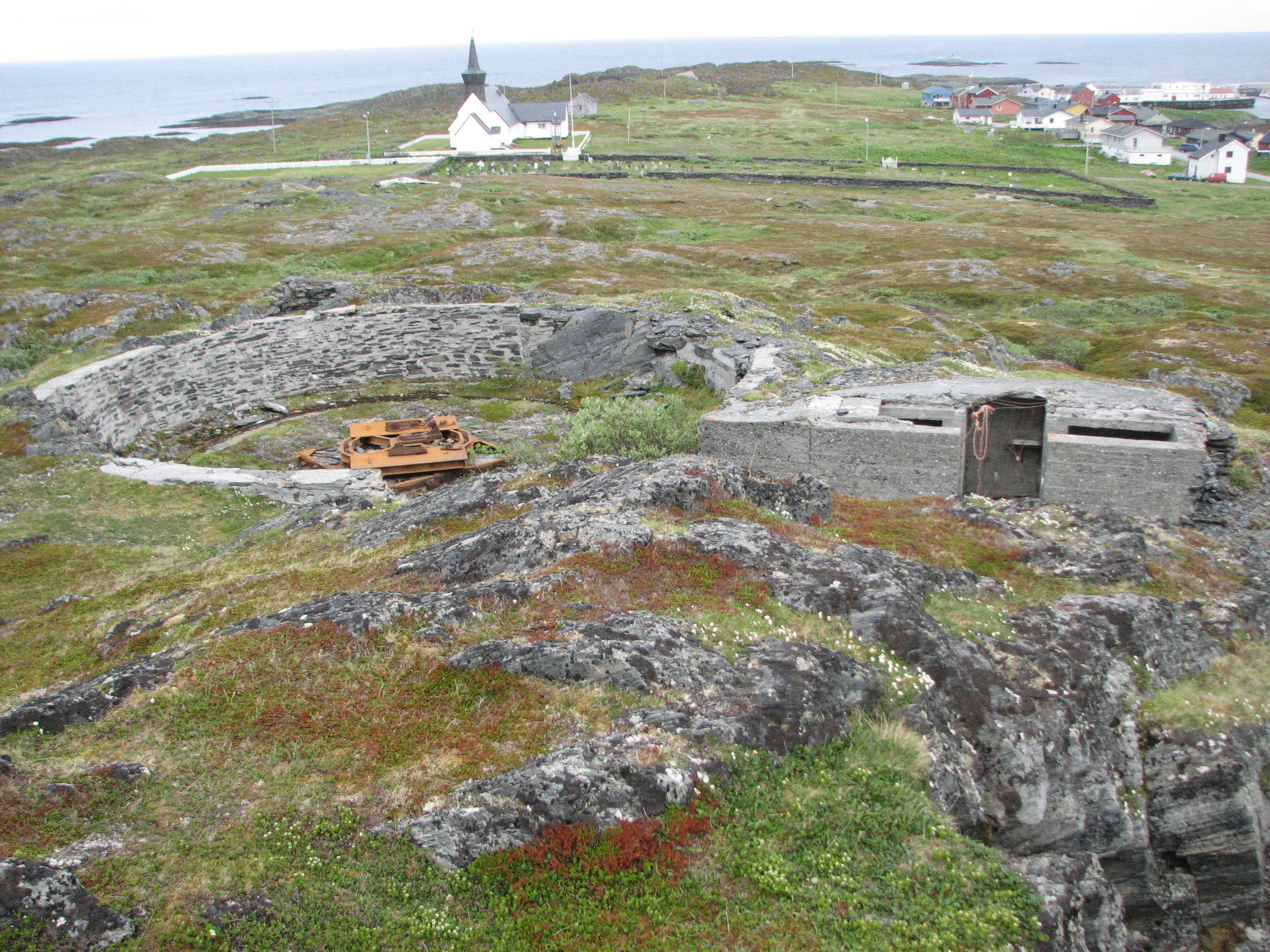
View of the church and historic fortifications

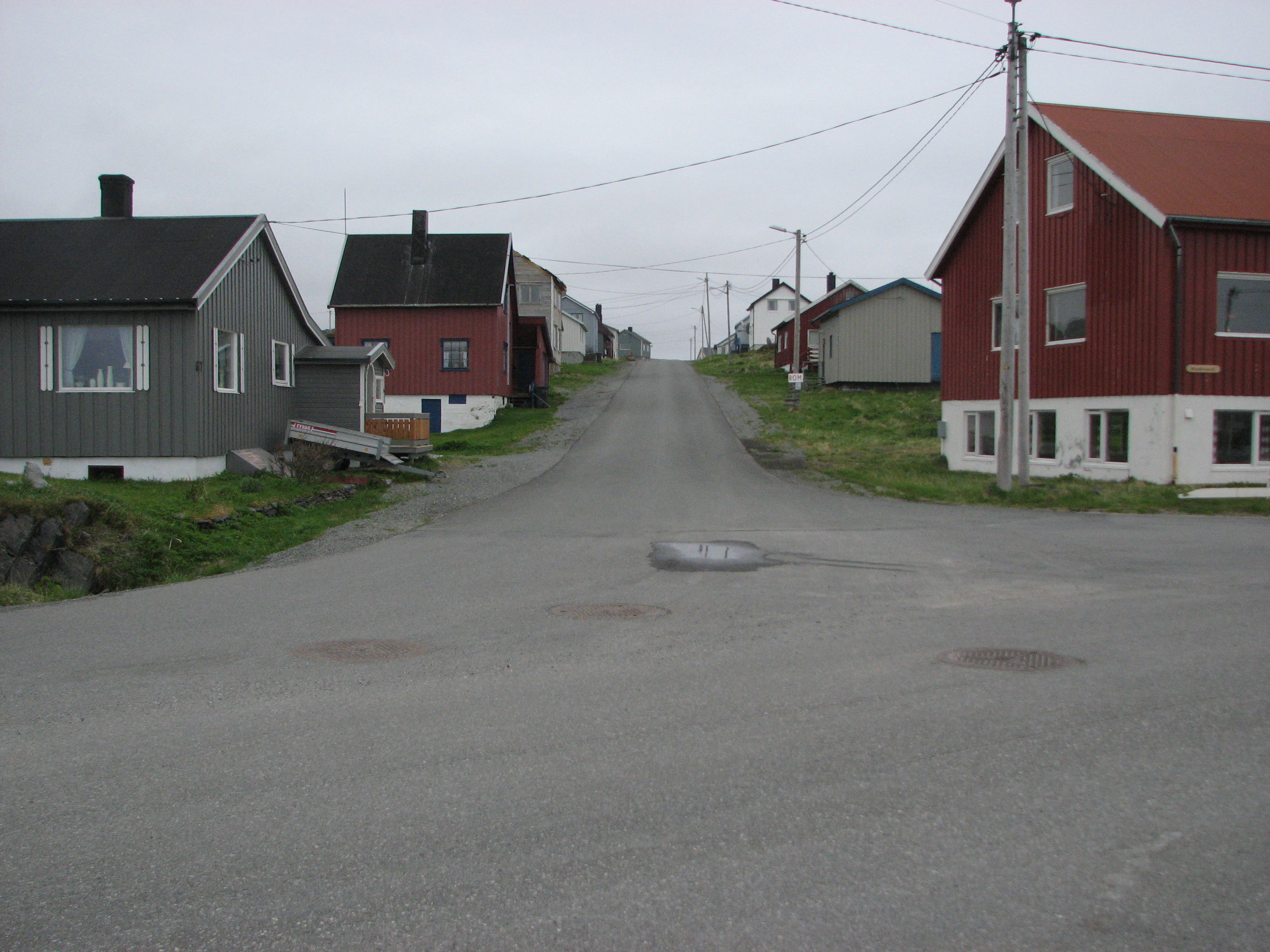
View of the village

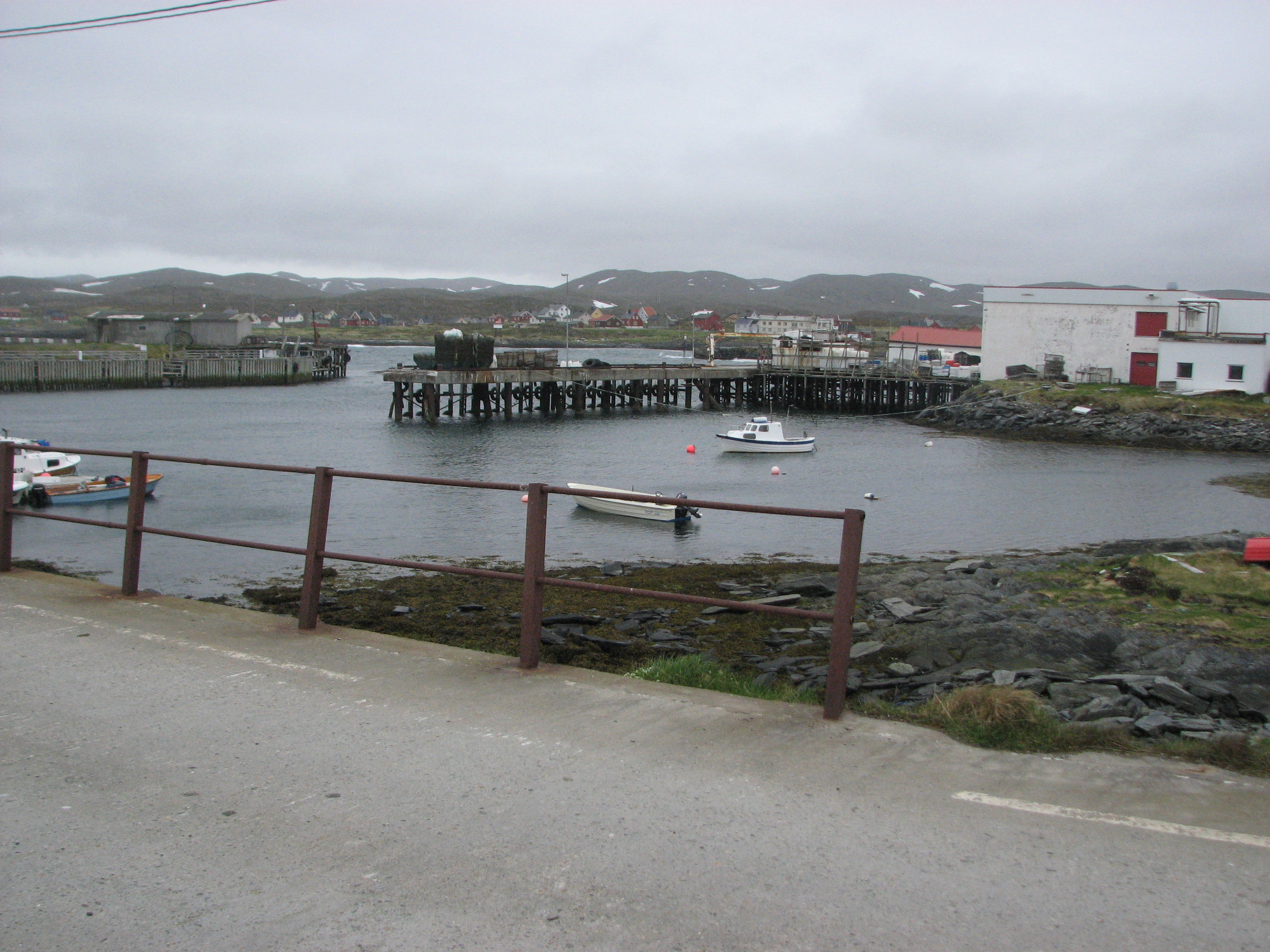
View of the harbor

== Climate ==
The Gamvik area has a maritime tundra climate (ET) that borders on being a subarctic climate (Dfc). This renders long, but moderated winters from the Gulf Stream waters, that renders overnight lows to average around the freezing point over a full year. In summers, brief heat bursts can reach the location through southerly winds. Temperatures mostly remain chilly during the months of midnight sun. Gamvik experiences a long polar night window as well due to its latitude at above 71°N.

Climate data for Slettnes Lighthouse 1991-2020 (8 m)
Month	Jan	Feb	Mar	Apr	May	Jun	Jul	Aug	Sep	Oct	Nov	Dec	Year
Record high °C (°F)	7.3 (45.1)	6.2 (43.2)	7.2 (45.0)	13.6 (56.5)	19.8 (67.6)	24.0 (75.2)	31.4 (88.5)	30.3 (86.5)	22.2 (72.0)	16.0 (60.8)	9.5 (49.1)	7.6 (45.7)	31.4 (88.5)
Mean daily maximum °C (°F)	−0.6 (30.9)	−1.2 (29.8)	−0.2 (31.6)	2.1 (35.8)	5.9 (42.6)	8.8 (47.8)	12.0 (53.6)	12.1 (53.8)	9.7 (49.5)	5.2 (41.4)	2.1 (35.8)	0.7 (33.3)	4.7 (40.5)
Daily mean °C (°F)	−3.2 (26.2)	−3.6 (25.5)	−2.3 (27.9)	0.2 (32.4)	3.8 (38.8)	6.7 (44.1)	9.6 (49.3)	9.9 (49.8)	7.7 (45.9)	3.4 (38.1)	0.0 (32.0)	−1.6 (29.1)	2.6 (36.7)
Mean daily minimum °C (°F)	−5.9 (21.4)	−6.4 (20.5)	−4.8 (23.4)	−1.9 (28.6)	1.8 (35.2)	5.0 (41.0)	7.8 (46.0)	8.0 (46.4)	5.7 (42.3)	1.3 (34.3)	−2.3 (27.9)	−4.2 (24.4)	0.3 (32.5)
Record low °C (°F)	−20.9 (−5.6)	−19.8 (−3.6)	−16.7 (1.9)	−12.8 (9.0)	−7.1 (19.2)	−2.8 (27.0)	3.6 (38.5)	2.3 (36.1)	−1.6 (29.1)	−9.5 (14.9)	−13.5 (7.7)	−16.8 (1.8)	−20.9 (−5.6)
Average precipitation mm (inches)	53.3 (2.10)	51.9 (2.04)	48.5 (1.91)	34.9 (1.37)	32.7 (1.29)	44.8 (1.76)	45.9 (1.81)	55.2 (2.17)	59.1 (2.33)	68.1 (2.68)	50.3 (1.98)	48.7 (1.92)	593.5 (23.37)
Average precipitation days (≥ 1 mm)	14.2	12.6	12.5	9.6	10.1	9.0	8.8	10.1	13.1	16.6	12.8	12.5	141.9
Source: Norwegian Meteorological Institute (precipitation 1991-2005)

Climate data for Slettnes Lighthouse (1981-2010)
Month	Jan	Feb	Mar	Apr	May	Jun	Jul	Aug	Sep	Oct	Nov	Dec	Year
Record high °C (°F)	7.3 (45.1)	6.8 (44.2)	7.2 (45.0)	13.6 (56.5)	23.4 (74.1)	28.3 (82.9)	32.2 (90.0)	27.5 (81.5)	22.2 (72.0)	16.0 (60.8)	9.5 (49.1)	7.7 (45.9)	32.2 (90.0)
Mean daily maximum °C (°F)	−1.1 (30.0)	−1.5 (29.3)	−0.5 (31.1)	1.8 (35.2)	5.3 (41.5)	8.6 (47.5)	11.8 (53.2)	11.6 (52.9)	9.1 (48.4)	4.9 (40.8)	1.5 (34.7)	−0.1 (31.8)	4.3 (39.7)
Daily mean °C (°F)	−3.7 (25.3)	−4.1 (24.6)	−2.7 (27.1)	−0.3 (31.5)	3.4 (38.1)	6.7 (44.1)	9.8 (49.6)	9.7 (49.5)	7.2 (45.0)	3.1 (37.6)	−0.7 (30.7)	−2.5 (27.5)	2.2 (36.0)
Mean daily minimum °C (°F)	−6.2 (20.8)	−6.6 (20.1)	−4.9 (23.2)	−2.3 (27.9)	1.5 (34.7)	4.8 (40.6)	7.7 (45.9)	7.7 (45.9)	5.3 (41.5)	1.2 (34.2)	−2.8 (27.0)	−4.9 (23.2)	0.0 (32.0)
Record low °C (°F)	−20.9 (−5.6)	−23.1 (−9.6)	−18.2 (−0.8)	−12.8 (9.0)	−10.8 (12.6)	−2.8 (27.0)	2.0 (35.6)	1.4 (34.5)	−4.3 (24.3)	−10.5 (13.1)	−13.7 (7.3)	−17.5 (0.5)	−23.1 (−9.6)
Average precipitation mm (inches)	51.4 (2.02)	49.5 (1.95)	45.3 (1.78)	36.2 (1.43)	34.7 (1.37)	42.2 (1.66)	50.6 (1.99)	46.7 (1.84)	54.9 (2.16)	70.4 (2.77)	53.9 (2.12)	48.2 (1.90)	584 (22.99)
