= Mehamn =

Village in Gamvik, Norway

Mehamn: Mehamn (Norwegian); Donjevuotna (Northern Sami); Meehamina (Kven)
- Village
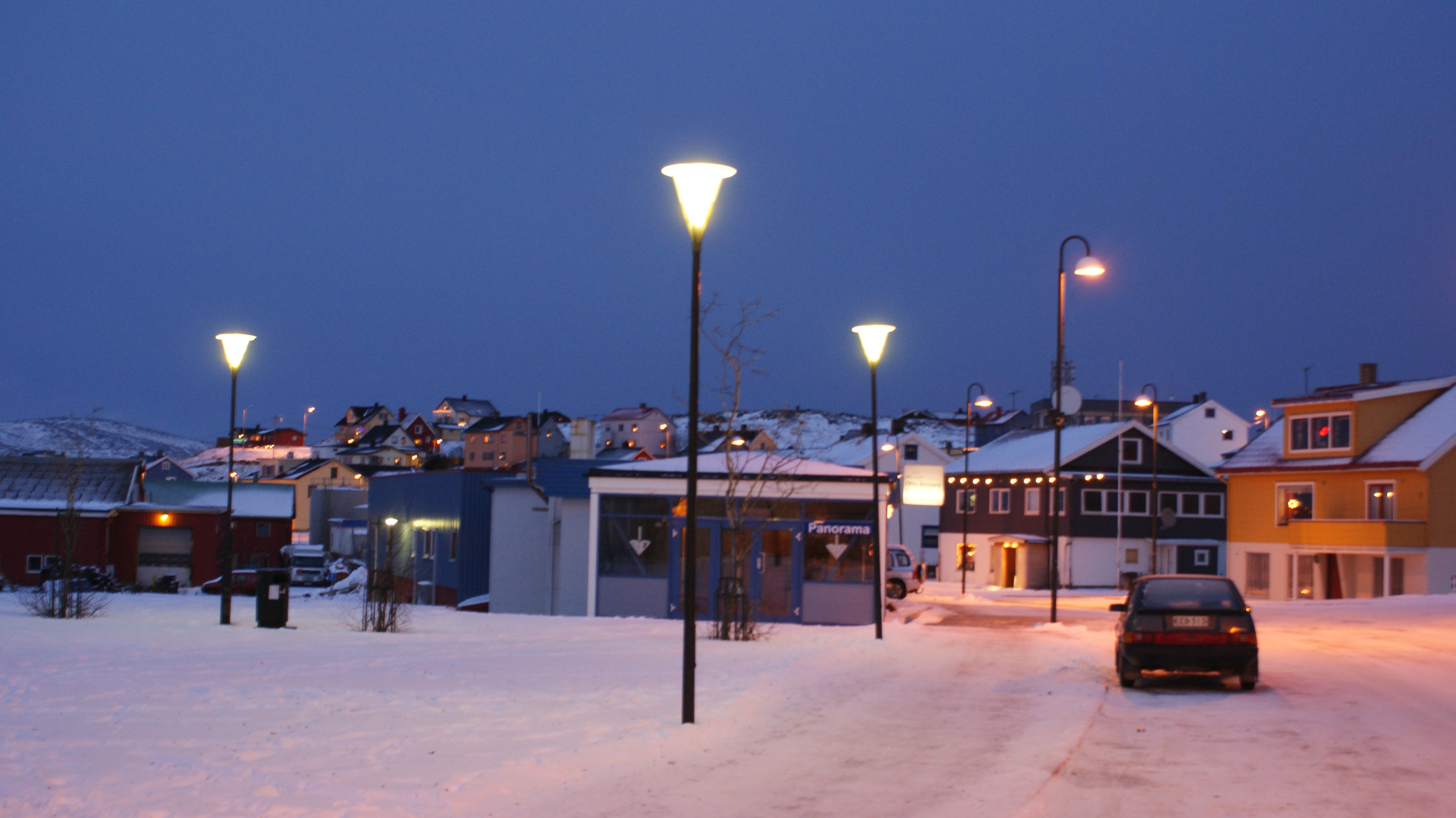
- Interactive map of Mehamn
- Location within Finnmark Location within Norway
- Coordinates: 71°02′08″N 27°50′57″E
- Country: Norway
- Region: Northern Norway
- County: Finnmark
- District: Øst-Finnmark
- Municipality: Gamvik Municipality

Area
  - Total: 0.59 km^{2} (0.23 sq mi)
- Elevation: 5 m (16 ft)

Population (2023)
  - Total: 703
  - Density: 1,198/km^{2} (3,100/sq mi)
- Time zone: UTC+01:00 (CET)
  - Summer (DST): UTC+02:00 (CEST)
- Post Code: 9770 Mehamn

Mehamn (Northern Sami: Donjevuotna; Kven: Meehamina; Archaic Russian: Sjestopalikha) is the administrative centre of Gamvik Municipality in Finnmark county, Norway. The village is located on the small Vedvik peninsula, itself part of the greater Nordkinn Peninsula, at the southern end of the Mehamnfjorden, a bay off of the Barents Sea. The village of Gamvik lies about 16 kilometres (9.9 mi) to the east and the village of Kjøllefjord (in Lebesby Municipality) lies about 30 kilometres (19 mi) to the southwest. Mehamn Chapel is located in this village. The 0.59-square-kilometre (150-acre) village has a population (2023) of 703 which gives the village a population density of 1,198 inhabitants per square kilometre (3,100/sq mi).

== History ==
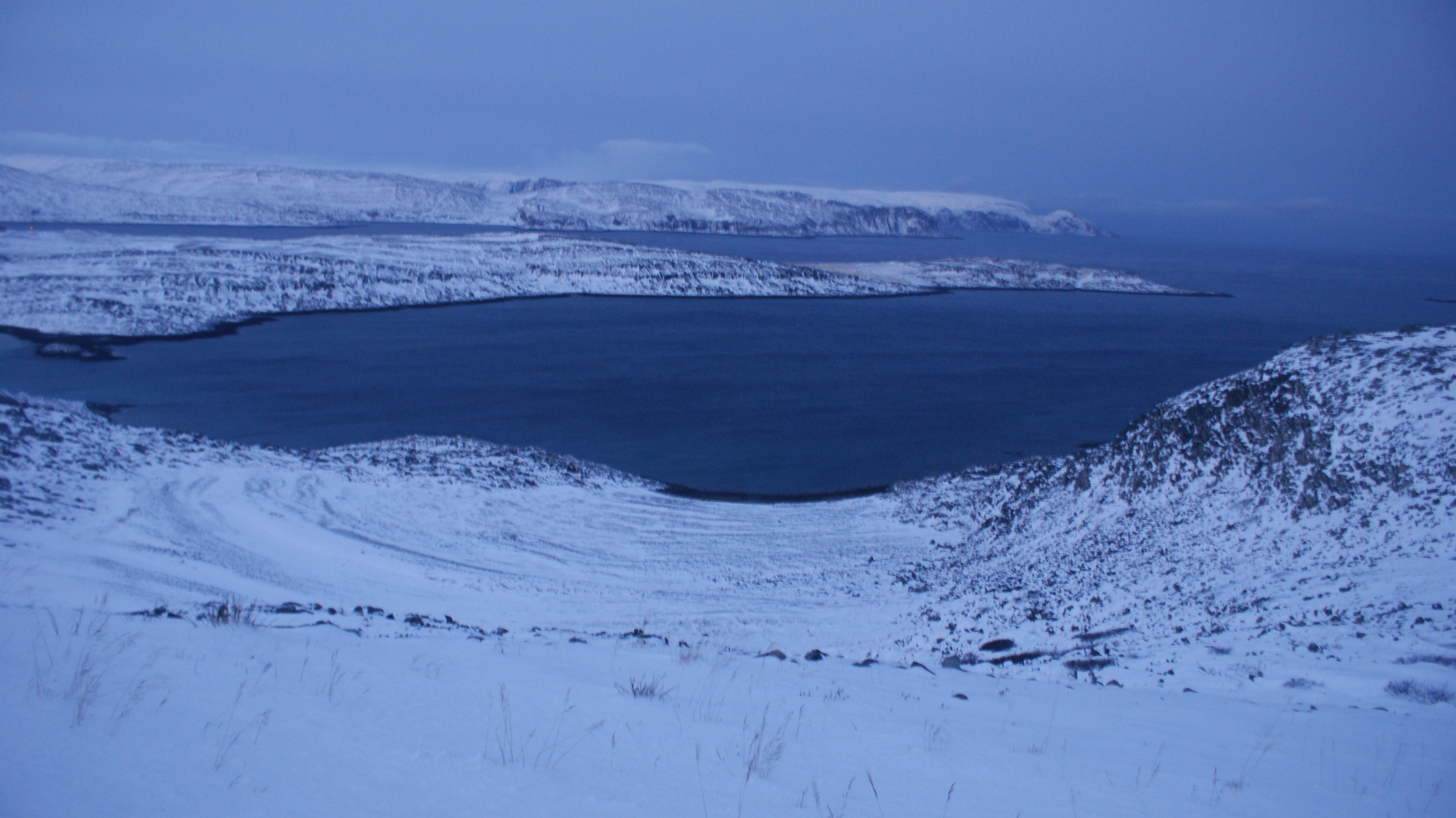
Mehamnfjorden during polar night, with Normannsethfjorden and Vedvikneset just north of Mehamn. Reipnakktinden as well as a sugarhead of Kinnarodden − the northernmost point on the Nordkinn Peninsula − are visible at the far end.

=== Whaling ===
Svend Foyn established the whaling station in Mehamn that was built in 1884-1885. It was put into use starting in the spring of 1885, and it became the largest of its kind in Finnmark County. After Foyn's death in 1894, the whaling station was run by Foyn's whaling company. Svend Foyn also established the Svend Foyn Chapel, in Mehamn starting in 1887.

=== Mehamn Rebellion ===
The background for the Mehamn rebellion was a period of miserable cod and capelin fishing. The fishermen blamed the local whaling. They believed that the whales chased the fish toward the shore. With few whales left, the fish stayed out of reach. Frustrations were growing by the day during the spring of 1903. By Whitsunday, about 2000 angry fishermen were in the harbor in Mehamn. At the time, the village had 123 permanent residents.

When the new manager of the whaling station denied help to a fishing boat that came from the sea with a broken helm, the fishermen had had enough. On 2 June 1903, a large number of them gathered outside the factory. During the following two days, machinery was destroyed, chimneys were torn down, and the large steam boilers were sunk. The guard and single police officer could do nothing but watch. Military forces from Vardø and Harstad were mobilized, but did not reach Mehamn before the factory was completely destroyed and the situation was calm again.

Some of the vandals were caught and convicted. They received very light sentences in jail and then the following autumn, general elections were held, and the Labour Party, which had fought for the protection of the whales, entered parliament for the first time with four MPs. They all represented the three northernmost counties of Norway. They were said to have "ridden to Parliament on a whale's back." In December, a law was passed ensuring the preservation of the whales in Norwegian waters off the coast of Nordland, Troms and Finnmark.

=== 1982 air crash ===
On 11 March 1982, a Widerøe Twin Otter crashed into the sea on approach to Mehamn Airport during the flight from Berlevåg Airport, killing all on board. Despite controversies regarding the cause of the crash, clear-air turbulence over the Mehamnfjorden was determined as the official cause.

== Climate ==
Mehamn has a boreal (subarctic) climate (Köppen: Dsc), with short and cool summers. The winters are long and sometimes windy, but winter temperatures are moderated by the nearby open sea and mild for the latitude. Mehamn is also sometimes affected by heat waves, the heat waves in 2018 and 2022 both saw high temperatures above 30 °C (86 °F).

Climate data for Mehamn, 1991–2020 normals, extremes 2003–present
Month	Jan	Feb	Mar	Apr	May	Jun	Jul	Aug	Sep	Oct	Nov	Dec	Year
Record high °C (°F)	7.0 (44.6)	7.0 (44.6)	7.8 (46.0)	11.7 (53.1)	20.7 (69.3)	30.8 (87.4)	31.2 (88.2)	28.4 (83.1)	22.5 (72.5)	15.0 (59.0)	9.1 (48.4)	8.0 (46.4)	31.2 (88.2)
Mean maximum °C (°F)	4.7 (40.5)	4.5 (40.1)	4.5 (40.1)	7.5 (45.5)	14.3 (57.7)	19.9 (67.8)	24.9 (76.8)	23.2 (73.8)	17.5 (63.5)	10.9 (51.6)	6.8 (44.2)	5.5 (41.9)	26.2 (79.2)
Mean daily maximum °C (°F)	−1.2 (29.8)	−1.7 (28.9)	−0.3 (31.5)	2.8 (37.0)	7.0 (44.6)	10.5 (50.9)	14.6 (58.3)	13.7 (56.7)	10.6 (51.1)	5.2 (41.4)	2.2 (36.0)	0.7 (33.3)	5.3 (41.5)
Daily mean °C (°F)	−4.1 (24.6)	−4.6 (23.7)	−2.9 (26.8)	−0.1 (31.8)	3.6 (38.5)	7.5 (45.5)	11.0 (51.8)	10.5 (50.9)	7.7 (45.9)	2.9 (37.2)	−0.8 (30.6)	−2.5 (27.5)	2.4 (36.3)
Mean daily minimum °C (°F)	−7.2 (19.0)	−7.6 (18.3)	−5.7 (21.7)	−2.3 (27.9)	1.7 (35.1)	5.5 (41.9)	8.6 (47.5)	7.9 (46.2)	5.3 (41.5)	0.8 (33.4)	−2.9 (26.8)	−4.9 (23.2)	−0.1 (31.8)
Mean minimum °C (°F)	−14.7 (5.5)	−14.6 (5.7)	−12.3 (9.9)	−9.1 (15.6)	−3.7 (25.3)	1.7 (35.1)	4.6 (40.3)	2.3 (36.1)	0.0 (32.0)	−5.7 (21.7)	−9.4 (15.1)	−11.0 (12.2)	−16.9 (1.6)
Record low °C (°F)	−19.0 (−2.2)	−21.4 (−6.5)	−16.8 (1.8)	−13.4 (7.9)	−8.7 (16.3)	−0.1 (31.8)	0.0 (32.0)	−0.7 (30.7)	−7.0 (19.4)	−10.6 (12.9)	−13.4 (7.9)	−17.0 (1.4)	−21.4 (−6.5)
Average precipitation mm (inches)	78.9 (3.11)	70.4 (2.77)	85.4 (3.36)	70.7 (2.78)	48.7 (1.92)	26.1 (1.03)	58.8 (2.31)	70.9 (2.79)	66.4 (2.61)	88.0 (3.46)	56.3 (2.22)	47.9 (1.89)	768.6 (30.26)
Average extreme snow depth cm (inches)	48 (19)	46 (18)	45 (18)	39 (15)	15 (5.9)	0 (0)	0 (0)	0 (0)	0 (0)	17 (6.7)	24 (9.4)	26 (10)	50 (20)
Average precipitation days (≥ 1.0 mm)	19	17	20	19	15	6	12	10	13	17	12	13	172
Average relative humidity (%)	79	79	78	77	75	78	79	80	79	81	81	79	79
Average dew point °C (°F)	−7.6 (18.3)	−7.5 (18.5)	−6.2 (20.8)	−3.3 (26.1)	0.1 (32.2)	3.5 (38.3)	7.5 (45.5)	7.0 (44.6)	4.5 (40.1)	0.0 (32.0)	−3.4 (25.9)	−5.2 (22.6)	−0.9 (30.4)
Source: Norwegian Meteorological Institute

== Transportation ==
Norwegian County Road 888 connects Mehamn to the European route E6 highway at the base of the Nordkinn Peninsula, and from there on to the towns of Kirkenes in the east and Alta in the west. Mehamn is a port of call for the Hurtigruten coastal ship. Mehamn is also connected by air via Mehamn Airport, with services by Widerøe to the nearby city of Tromsø.
