= Gamvik Church =

- Gamvik kirke
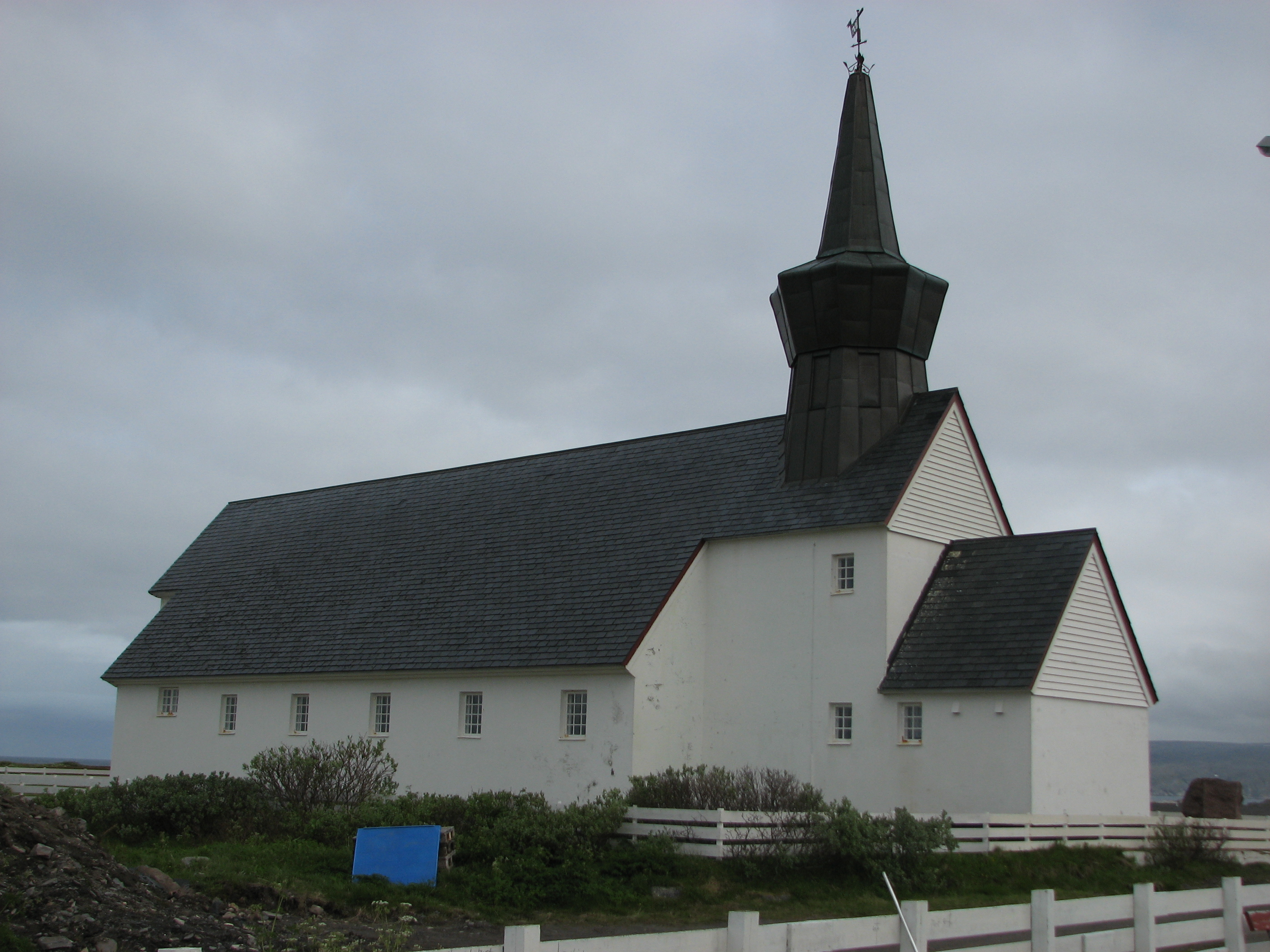
- View of the church
- Gamvik Church
- 71.065760°N 28.247247°E
- Location: Gamvik Municipality, Finnmark
- Country: Norway
- Denomination: Church of Norway
- Churchmanship: Evangelical Lutheran

History
- Status: Parish church
- Founded: 1858
- Consecrated: 27 April 1958

Architecture
- Functional status: Active
- Architect(s): Gudolf Blakstad and Herman Munthe-Kaas
- Architectural type: Long church
- Completed: 1958 (68 years ago)

Specifications
- Capacity: 224
- Materials: Concrete

Administration
- Diocese: Nord-Hålogaland
- Deanery: Hammerfest prosti
- Parish: Gamvik
- Norwegian Cultural Heritage Site
- Type: Church
- Status: Not protected
- ID: 84229

Gamvik Church (Norwegian: Gamvik kirke) is a parish church of the Church of Norway in Gamvik Municipality in Finnmark county, Norway. It is located in the village of Gamvik. It is the main church for the Gamvik parish which is part of the Hammerfest prosti (deanery) in the Diocese of Nord-Hålogaland. The white, concrete church was built in a long church design in 1958 using plans drawn up by the architects Gudolf Blakstad and Herman Munthe-Kaas. The church seats about 224 people.

== History ==
The first church in Gamvik was the Samekapellet (English: Sami Chapel) which was moved here in 1858 from Tana Municipality. That chapel was taken down and replaced with a new church in 1894 that was designed by the architect D. G. Evjen. That new church had 264 seats. On 5 November 1944 the retreating German army burned down the church near the end of World War II. The present church was constructed in 1957-1958 as the new main church for the municipality. It was designed by the architects Gudolf Blakstad and Herman Munthe-Kaas. It was consecrated on 27 April 1958 by the Bishop Alf Wiig. The present Gamvik Church is built of concrete and has 224 seats in the main room and 80 in the parish hall.

== Media gallery ==
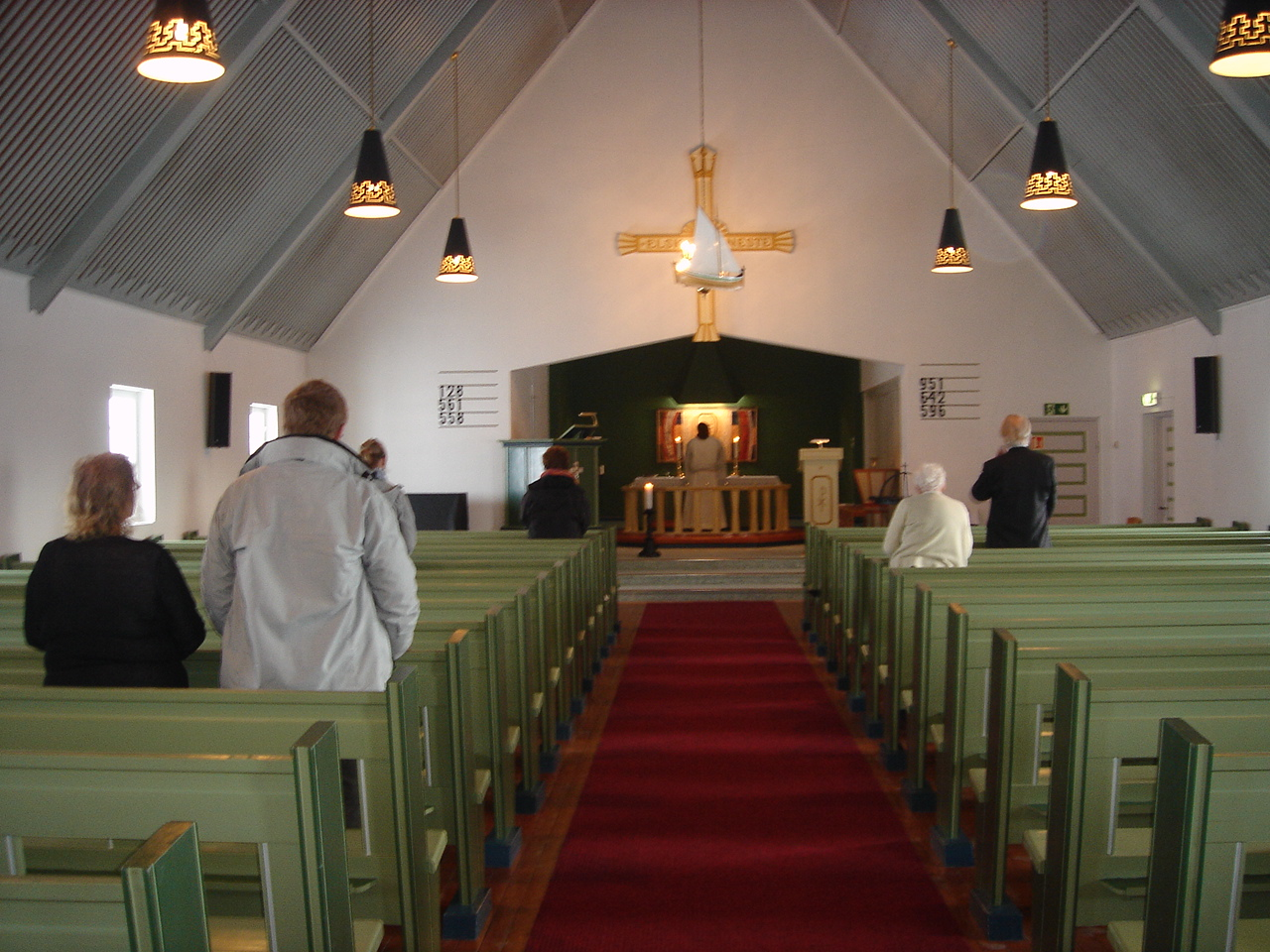
View of the interior

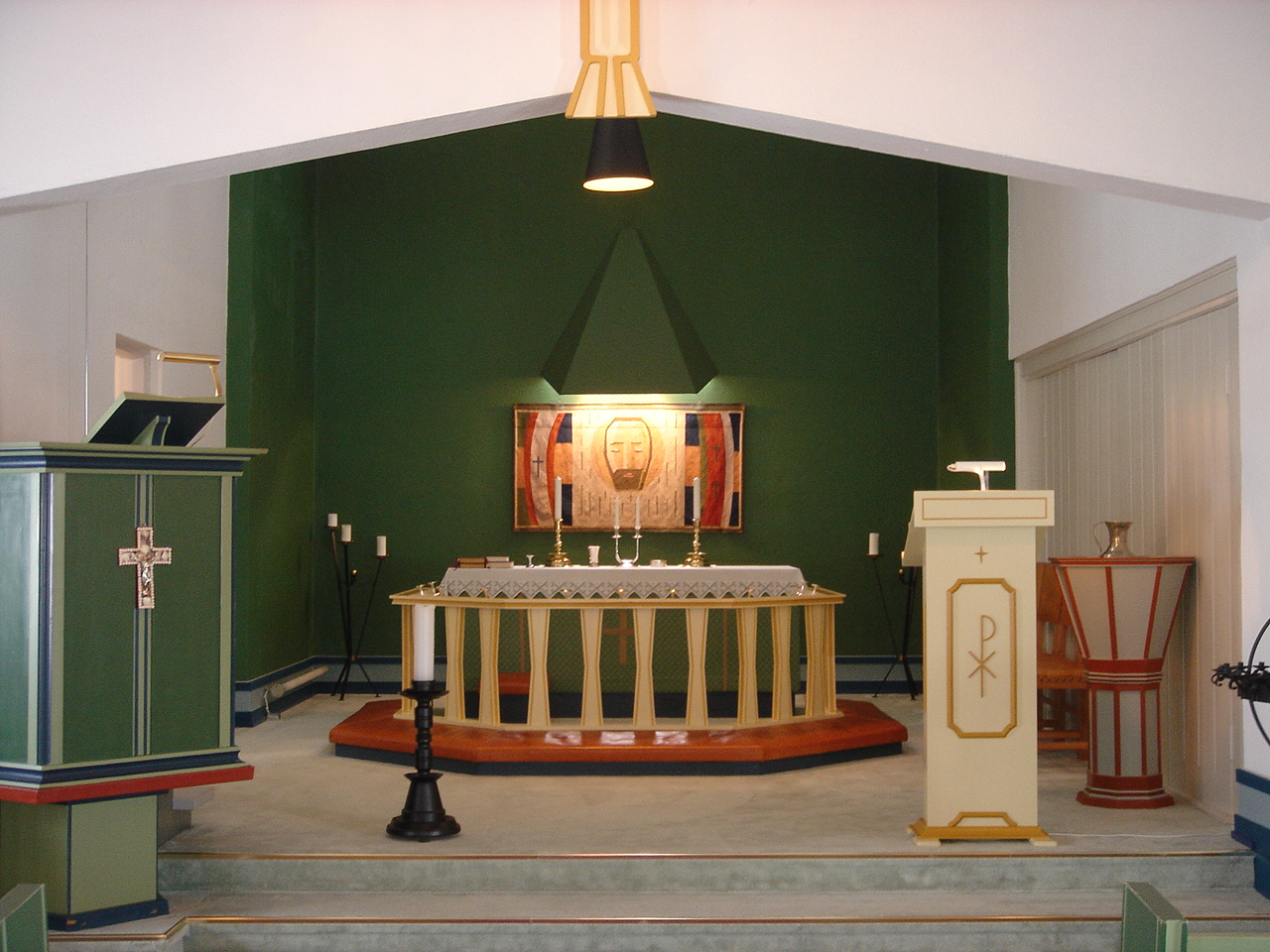
Front of the church

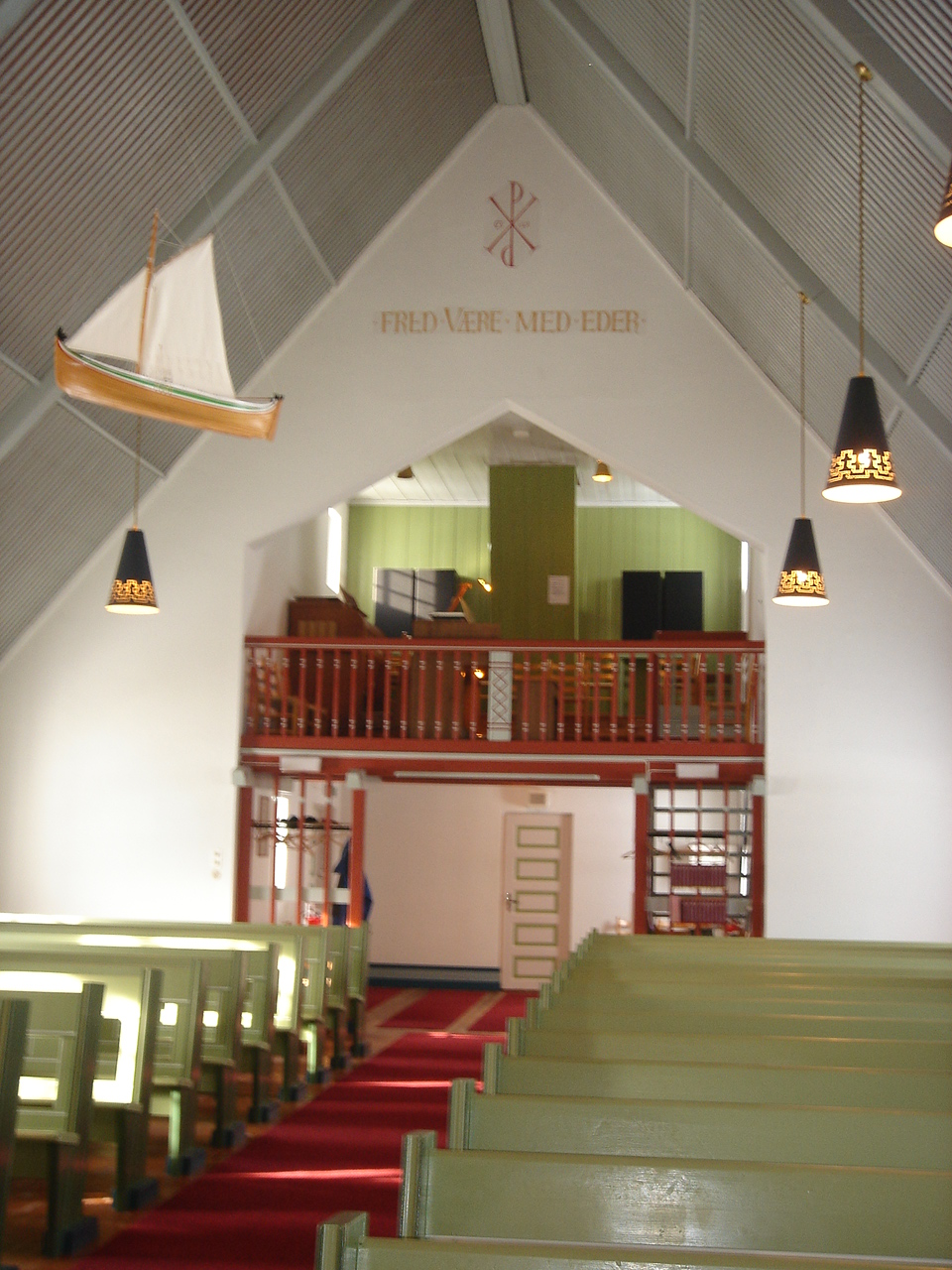
View of the back of the church

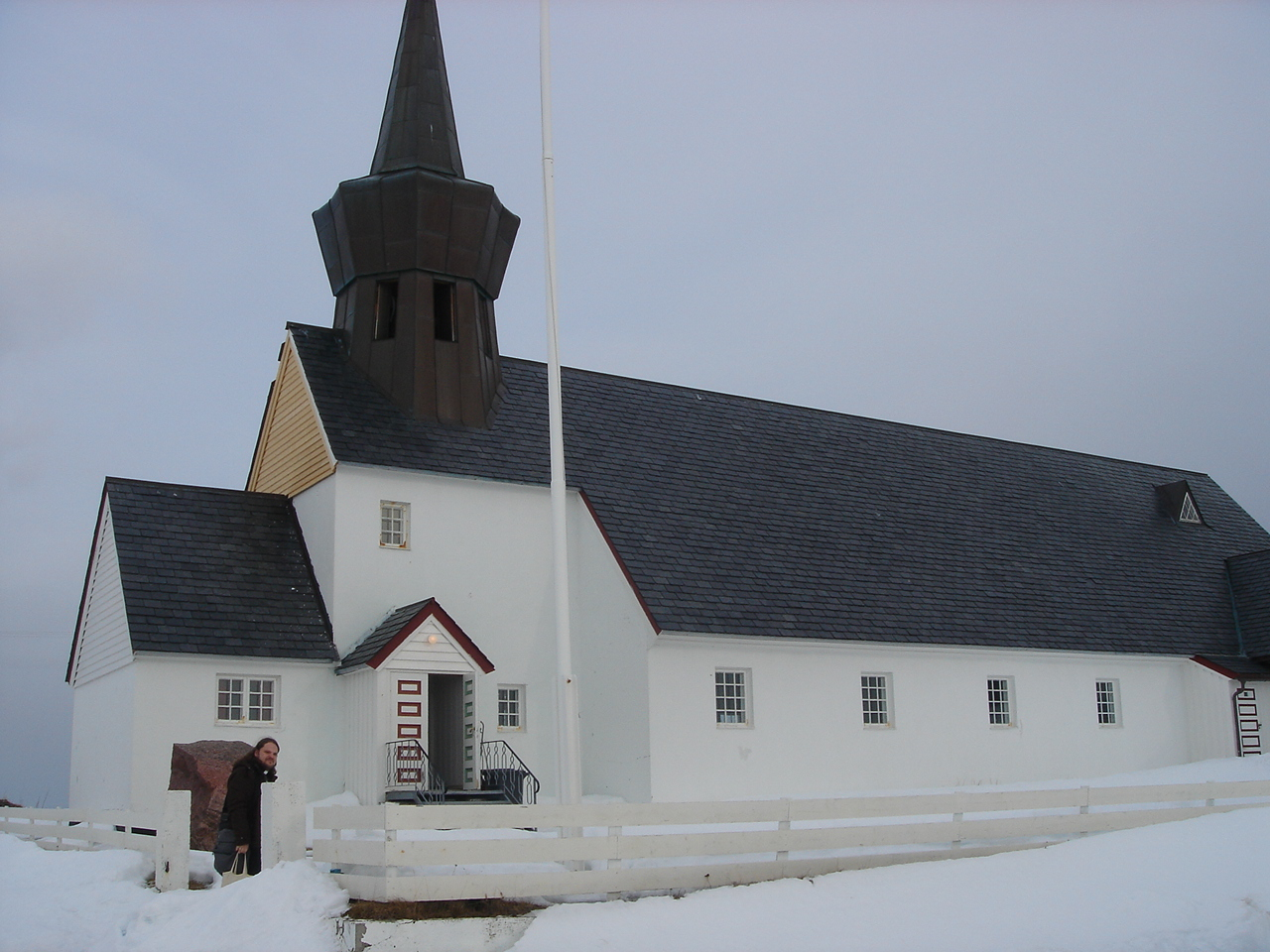
View of the exterior

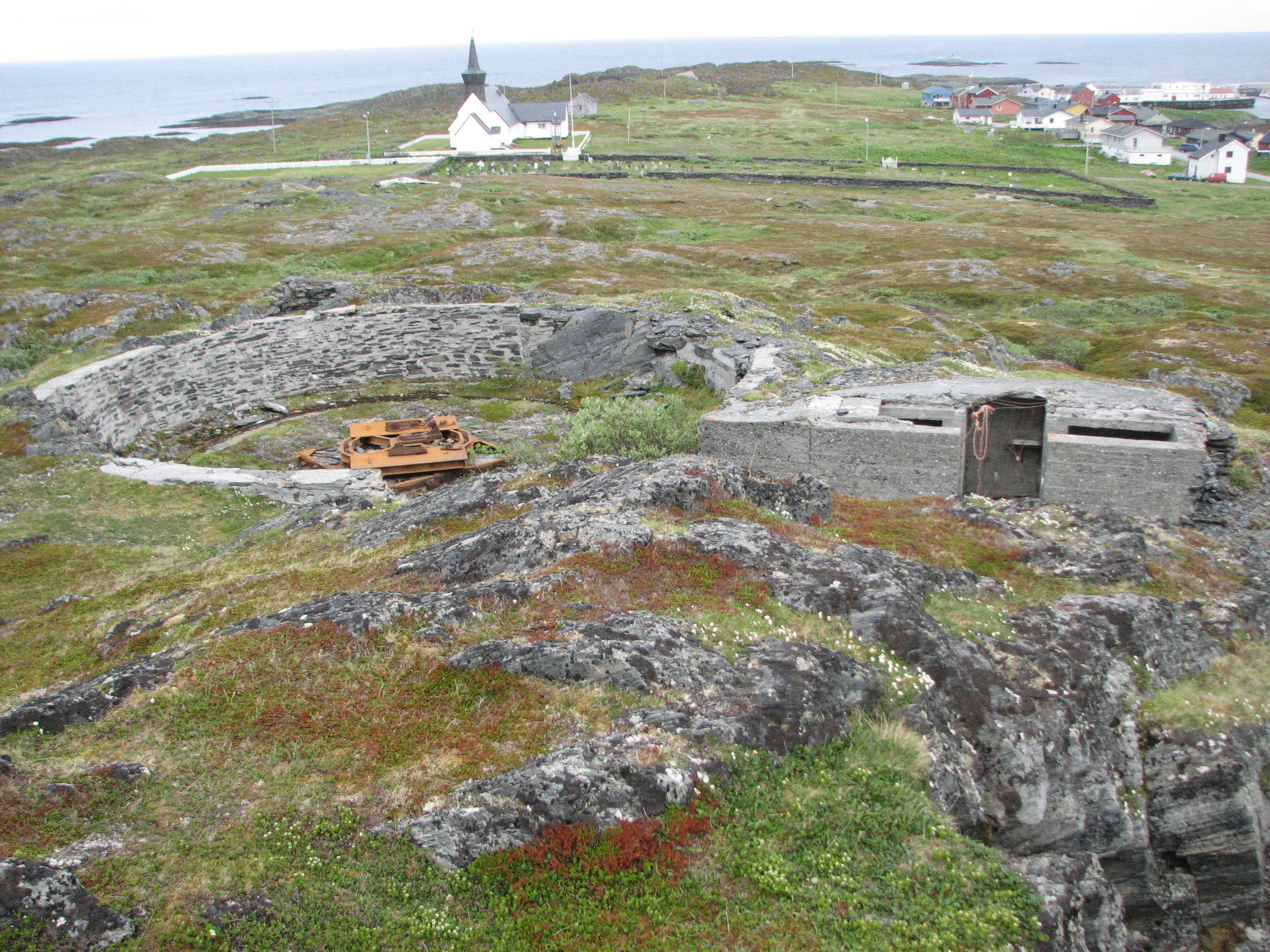
View of the area surrounding the church

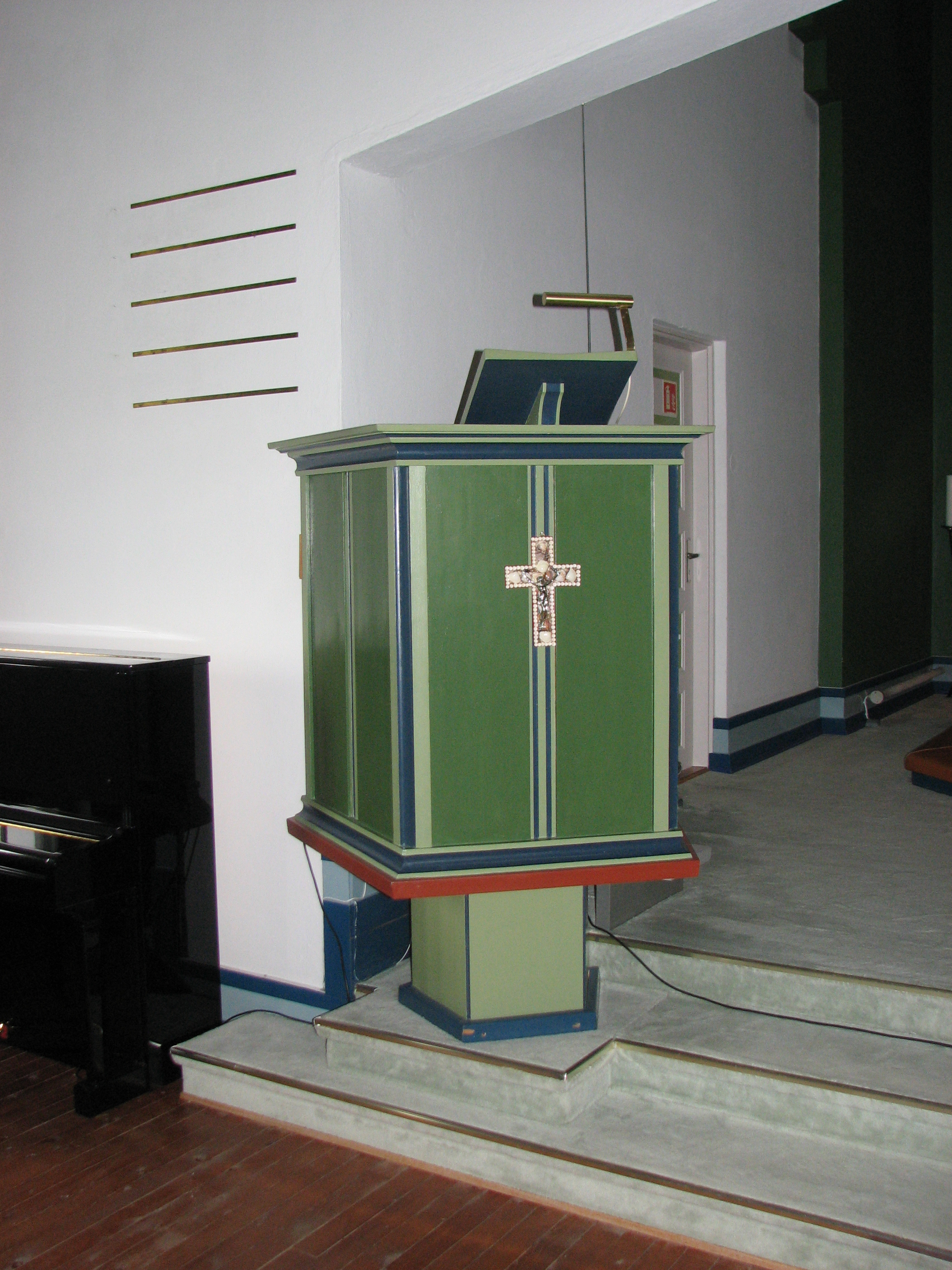
View of the pulpit

== See also ==
- List of churches in Nord-Hålogaland
