= Gamvik Municipality =

Municipality in Finnmark, Norway

Gamvik Municipality Gamvik kommune Gáŋgaviikka gielda (Northern Sami)
- Municipality
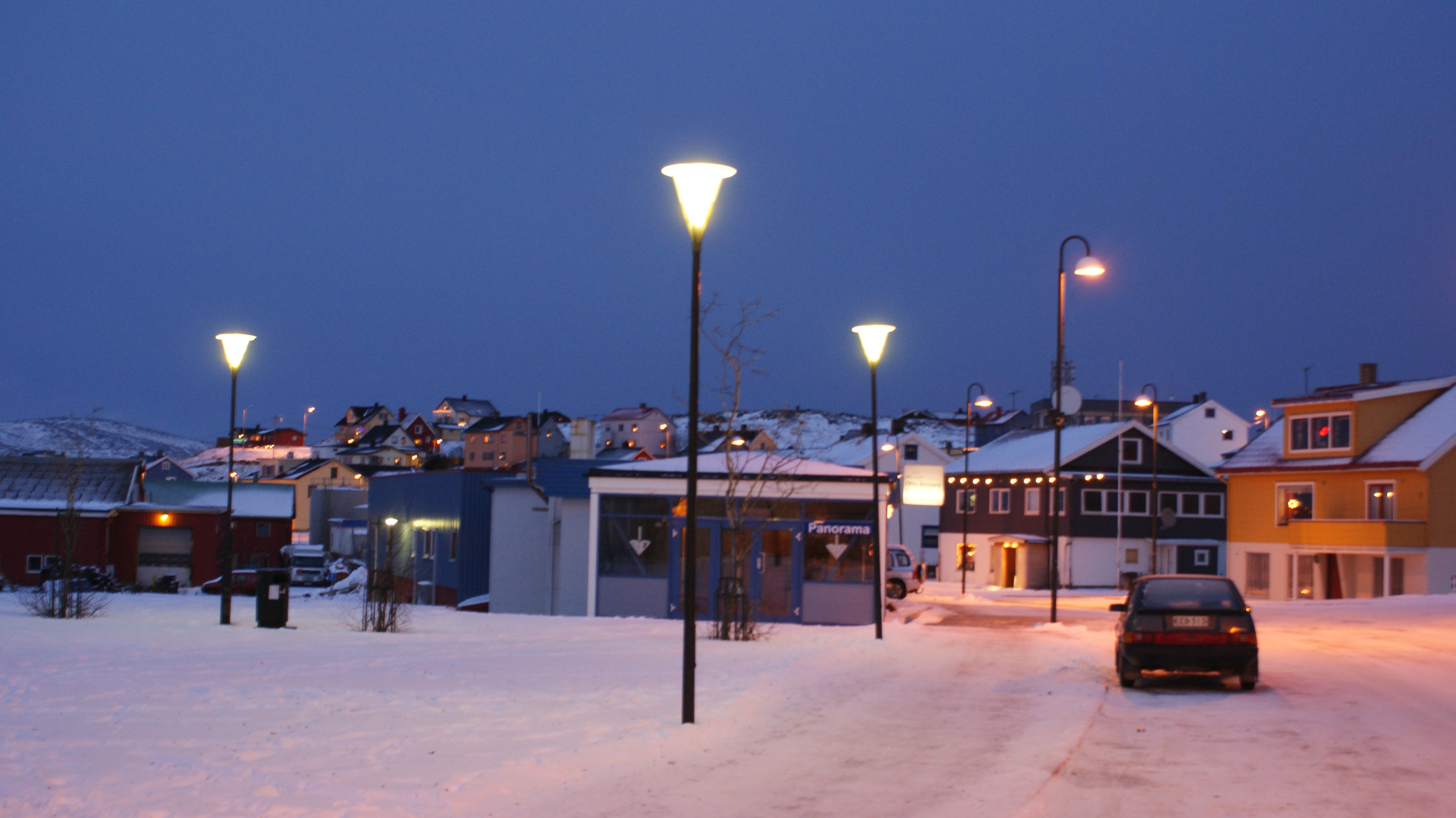
- View of Mehamn on New Year's Day (during the polar night)

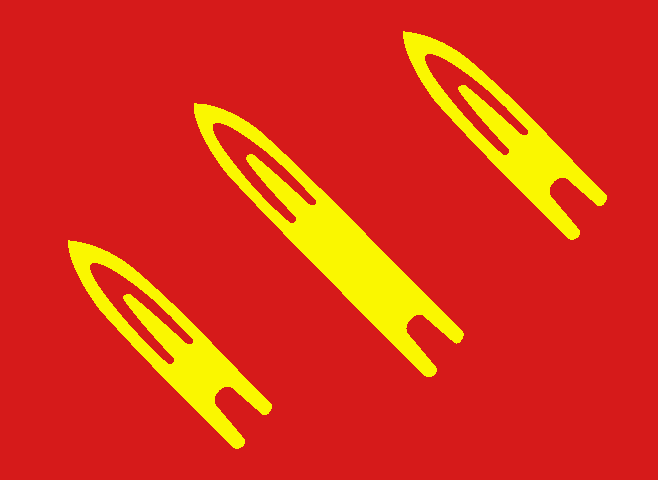
- Flag Coat of arms

- Finnmark within Norway

- Gamvik within Finnmark
- Coordinates: 71°02′28″N 27°51′05″E
- Country: Norway
- County: Finnmark
- District: Øst-Finnmark
- Established: 1 Jan 1914
  - Preceded by: Tana Municipality
- Administrative centre: Mehamn

Government
  - Mayor (2023): Ragnhlid Vassvik (Ap)

Area
  - Total: 1,416.55 km^{2} (546.93 sq mi)
  - Land: 1,355.08 km^{2} (523.20 sq mi)
  - Water: 61.47 km^{2} (23.73 sq mi) 4.3%
  - Rank: #65 in Norway
- Highest elevation: 672.3 m (2,206 ft)

Population (2024)
  - Total: 1,070
  - Rank: #331 in Norway
  - Density: 0.8/km^{2} (2.1/sq mi)
  - Change (10 years): ▼ −2.6%
- Demonym(s): Gamviking; Gamvikværing

Official language
  - Norwegian form: Neutral
- Time zone: UTC+01:00 (CET)
  - Summer (DST): UTC+02:00 (CEST)
- ISO 3166 code: NO-5626
- Website: Official website

Gamvik (Northern Sami: Gáŋgaviika) is a municipality in Finnmark county, Norway. The administrative centre of the municipality is the village of Mehamn. The other notable villages in Gamvik include Gamvik and Skjånes. Gamvik is known as one of the poorest and most undeveloped municipalities in Norway. The number of inhabitants rose at one moment in 2012, but in 2014, after the fish factory closed, the population declined dramatically with the departure of the eastern European fishermen.

Most people live in the village of Mehamn (about 500 inhabitants), which has an airport, Mehamn Airport, and is also a port of call of the hurtigruten coastal boats. The Slettnes Lighthouse near the village of Gamvik is the northernmost lighthouse on the mainland of Europe. Nervei and Langfjordbotn are two very small villages in southern Gamvik that are only accessible by boat. Finnkongkeila is an abandoned village along the Tanafjorden.

The 1,416-square-kilometre (547 sq mi) municipality is the 65th largest by area out of the 357 municipalities in Norway. Gamvik is the 331st most populous municipality in Norway with a population of 1,070. The municipality's population density is 0.8 inhabitants per square kilometre (2.1/sq mi) and its population has decreased by 2.6% over the previous 10-year period.

== General information ==
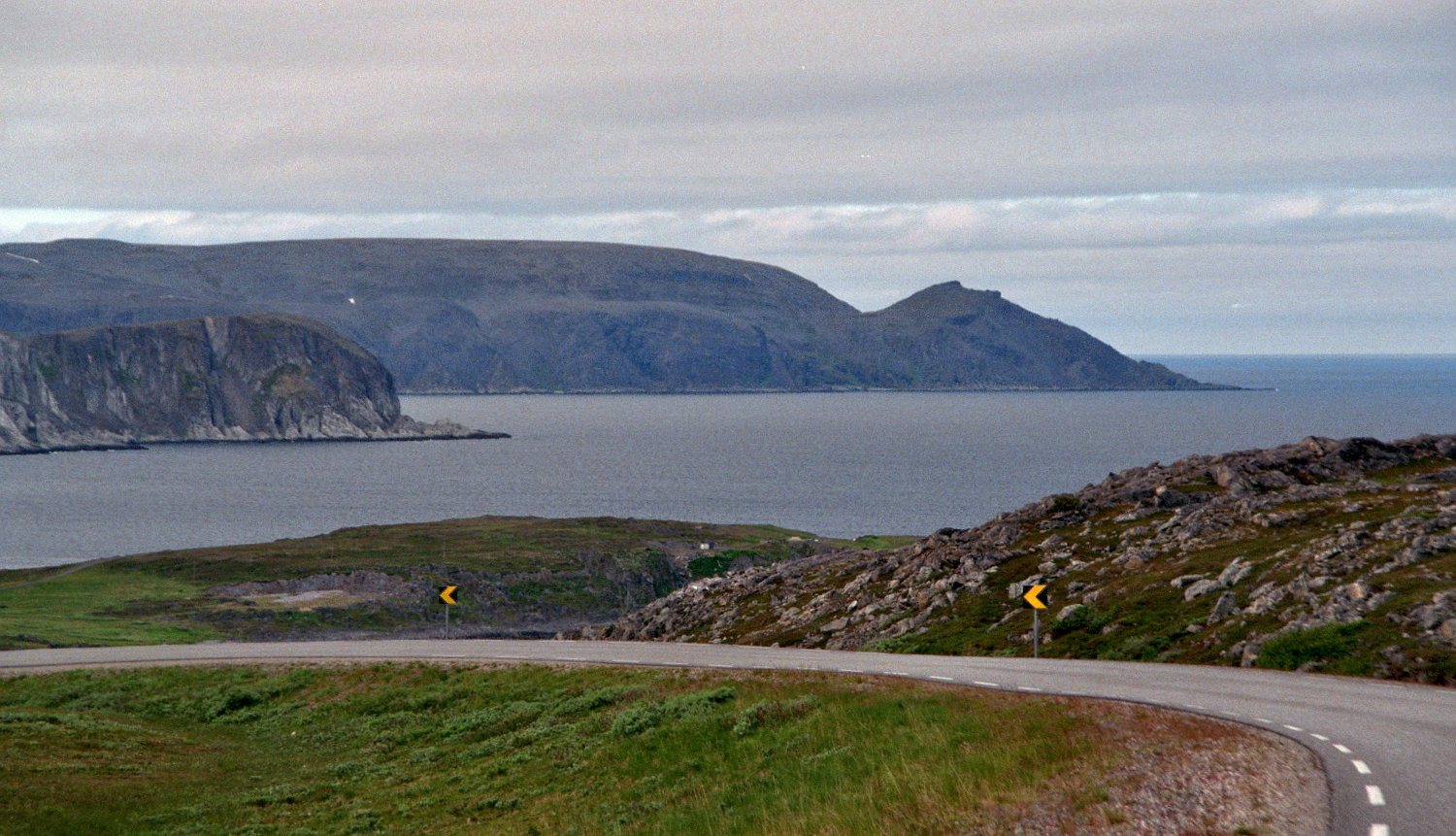
View from Gamvik

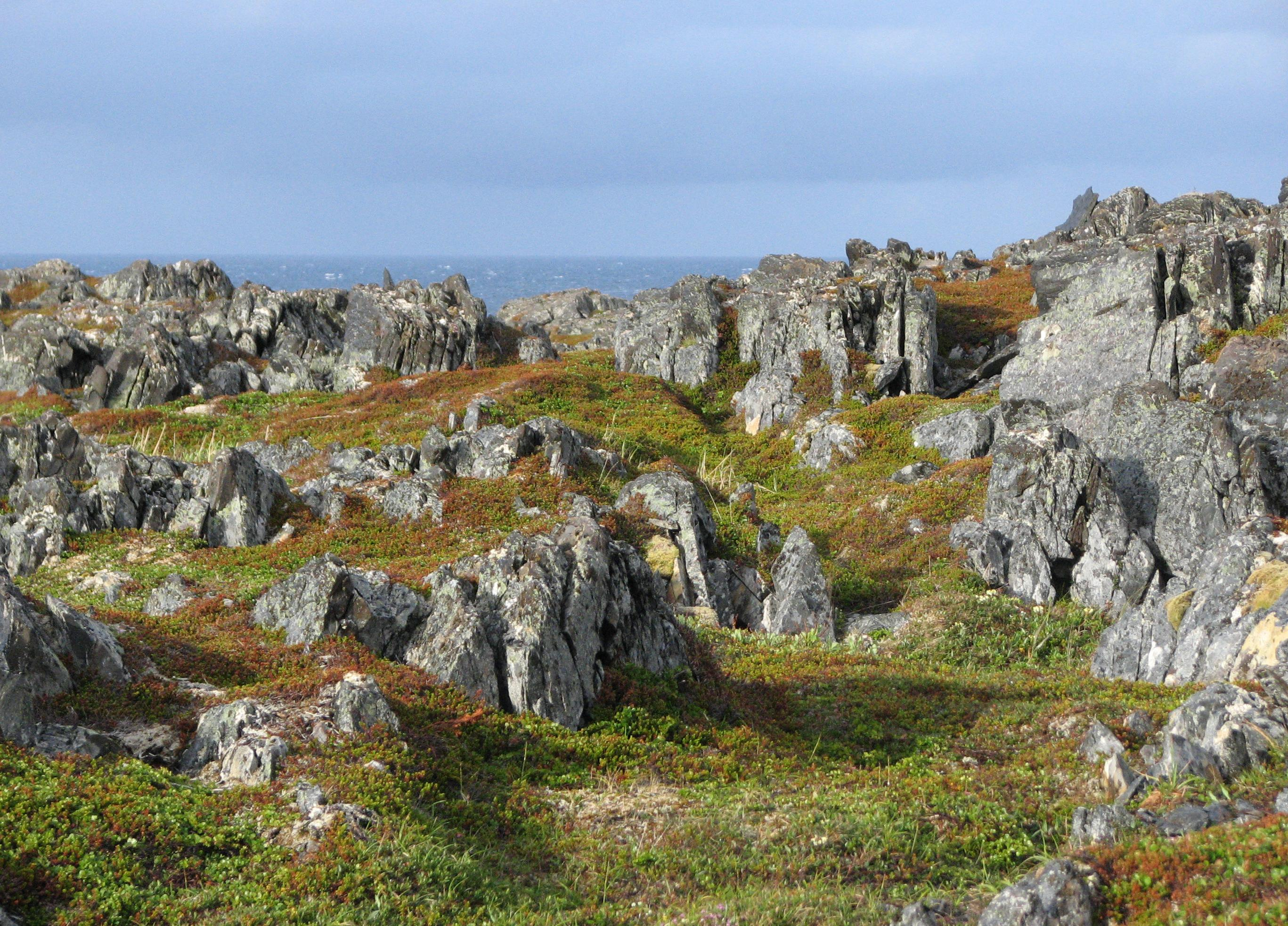
View of the Slettnes Nature Reserve

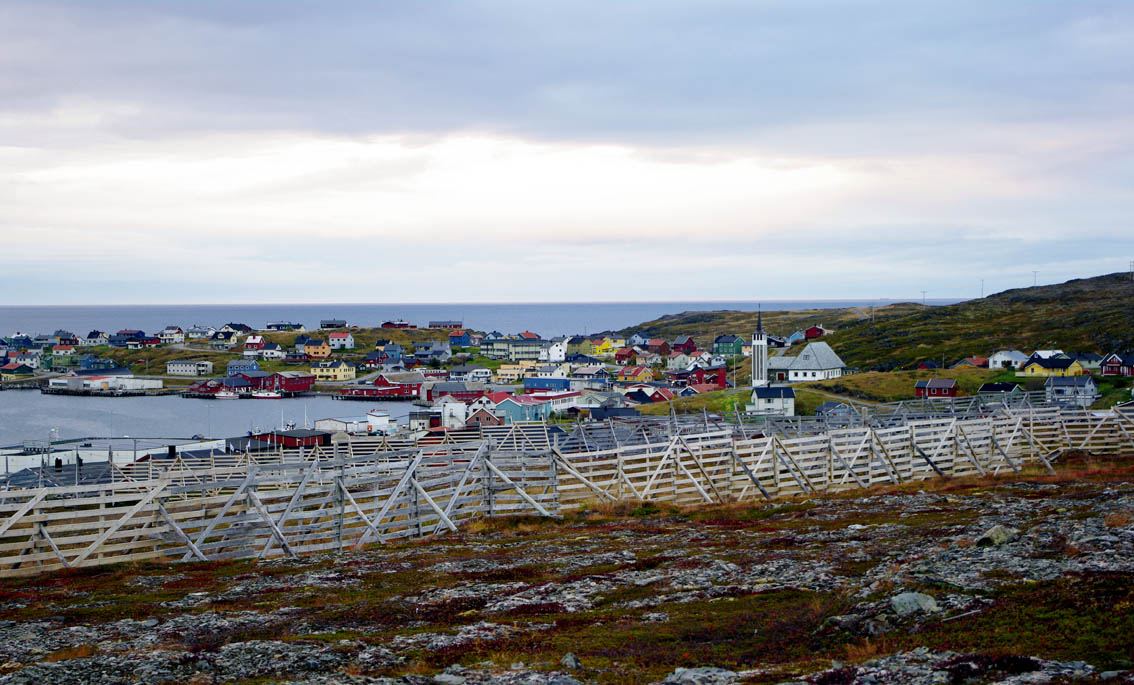
View of Mehamn

The municipality of Gamvik was established on 1 January 1914 when the old Tana Municipality was divided into three municipalities: Tana (population: 1,426) in the south, Berlevåg Municipality (population: 784) in the northeast, and Gamvik Municipality (population: 1,371) in the northwest. The municipal boundaries have not changed since that time.

On 1 January 2020, the municipality became part of the newly formed Troms og Finnmark county. Previously, it had been part of the old Finnmark county. On 1 January 2024, the Troms og Finnmark county was divided and the municipality once again became part of Finnmark county.

=== Name ===
The Old Norse form of the name may have been Gangvík. The first element is then gangr which means "path" and the last element is vík which means "cove" or "wick".

=== Coat of arms ===
The coat of arms was granted on 28 September 1990. The official blazon is "Gules, three net needles Or in bend sinister" (Norwegian: I rødt tre skråstilte gule garnnåler). This means the arms have a red field (background) and the charge is three fishing net sewing needles that are arranged diagonally. The net needles have a tincture of Or which means it is commonly colored yellow, but if it is made out of metal, then gold is used. These needles are a characteristic maritime tool used for making and mending the fishing nets used by local fishermen. These arms were chosen to emphasize the importance of fishing in the area.

=== Churches ===
The Church of Norway has one parish (sokn) within Gamvik Municipality. It is part of the Hammerfest prosti (deanery) in the Diocese of Nord-Hålogaland.

Churches in Gamvik Municipality
Parish (sokn)	Church name	Location of the church	Year built
Gamvik	Gamvik Church	Gamvik	1958
Gamvik	Hop Church	Skjånes	1977
Gamvik	Mehamn Chapel	Mehamn	1965

== History ==
In June 1972 construction started for [a landside terminal and] running a SOSUS cable into the sea. The SOSUS station was one of more than twenty worldwide.

=== 1982 air crash ===
On 12 March 1982, a Widerøe Twin Otter, registration number LN-BNK, crashed into the sea near Mehamn, killing all fifteen on board. More than twenty years and four rounds of investigation later, this incident remained highly controversial in Norway.

== Government ==
Gamvik Municipality is responsible for primary education (through 10th grade), outpatient health services, senior citizen services, welfare and other social services, zoning, economic development, and municipal roads and utilities. The municipality is governed by a municipal council of directly elected representatives. The mayor is indirectly elected by a vote of the municipal council. The municipality is under the jurisdiction of the Indre og Østre Finnmark District Court and the Hålogaland Court of Appeal.

=== Municipal council ===
The municipal council (Kommunestyre) of Gamvik Municipality is made up of 13 representatives that are elected to four year terms. The tables below show the current and historical composition of the council by political party.

Gamvik kommunestyre 2023–2027
Party name (in Norwegian)	Number of representatives
Labour Party (Arbeiderpartiet)	6
Progress Party (Fremskrittspartiet)	1
Centre Party (Senterpartiet)	1
Socialist Left Party (Sosialistisk Venstreparti)	5
Total number of members:	13

Gamvik kommunestyre 2019–2023
Party name (in Norwegian)	Number of representatives
Labour Party (Arbeiderpartiet)	6
Progress Party (Fremskrittspartiet)	1
Centre Party (Senterpartiet)	2
Socialist Left Party (Sosialistisk Venstreparti)	4
Total number of members:	13

Gamvik kommunestyre 2015–2019
Party name (in Norwegian)	Number of representatives
Labour Party (Arbeiderpartiet)	7
Progress Party (Fremskrittspartiet)	2
Socialist Left Party (Sosialistisk Venstreparti)	4
Total number of members:	13

Gamvik kommunestyre 2011–2015
Party name (in Norwegian)	Number of representatives
Labour Party (Arbeiderpartiet)	5
Progress Party (Fremskrittspartiet)	1
Conservative Party (Høyre)	2
Socialist Left Party (Sosialistisk Venstreparti)	3
Cross-Party List (Tverrpolitisk liste)	2
Total number of members:	13

Gamvik kommunestyre 2007–2011
Party name (in Norwegian)	Number of representatives
Labour Party (Arbeiderpartiet)	9
Conservative Party (Høyre)	3
Socialist Left Party (Sosialistisk Venstreparti)	1
Total number of members:	13

Gamvik kommunestyre 2003–2007
Party name (in Norwegian)	Number of representatives
Labour Party (Arbeiderpartiet)	8
Socialist Left Party (Sosialistisk Venstreparti)	5
Total number of members:	13

Gamvik kommunestyre 1999–2003
Party name (in Norwegian)	Number of representatives
Labour Party (Arbeiderpartiet)	9
Socialist Left Party (Sosialistisk Venstreparti)	2
Cross-Party List (Tverrpolitisk liste)	2
Total number of members:	13

Gamvik kommunestyre 1995–1999
Party name (in Norwegian)	Number of representatives
Labour Party (Arbeiderpartiet)	8
Socialist Left Party (Sosialistisk Venstreparti)	2
Cross-Party List (Tverrpolitisk liste)	6
Fjoran Cross-Party List (Fjoran Tverrpolitiske liste)	1
Total number of members:	17

Gamvik kommunestyre 1991–1995
Party name (in Norwegian)	Number of representatives
Labour Party (Arbeiderpartiet)	6
Socialist Left Party (Sosialistisk Venstreparti)	4
Cross-Party List (Tverrpolitisk liste)	7
Total number of members:	17

Gamvik kommunestyre 1987–1991
Party name (in Norwegian)	Number of representatives
Labour Party (Arbeiderpartiet)	9
Socialist Left Party (Sosialistisk Venstreparti)	2
Cross-Party List (Tverrpolitisk liste)	6
Total number of members:	17

Gamvik kommunestyre 1983–1987
Party name (in Norwegian)	Number of representatives
Labour Party (Arbeiderpartiet)	11
Conservative Party (Høyre)	1
Socialist Left Party (Sosialistisk Venstreparti)	1
Cross-Party Common List (Tverrpolitisk fellesliste)	4
Total number of members:	17

Gamvik kommunestyre 1979–1983
Party name (in Norwegian)	Number of representatives
Labour Party (Arbeiderpartiet)	11
Cross-Party Common List (Tverrpolitisk fellesliste)	6
Total number of members:	17

Gamvik kommunestyre 1975–1979
Party name (in Norwegian)	Number of representatives
Labour Party (Arbeiderpartiet)	12
Christian Democratic Party (Kristelig Folkeparti)	1
Common List for Gamvik and Fjord district (Fellesliste for Gamvik og Fjorddistrikt)	3
Mehamn Free Voter List (Mehamn Frie Velgeres Liste)	1
Total number of members:	17

Gamvik kommunestyre 1971–1975
Party name (in Norwegian)	Number of representatives
Labour Party (Arbeiderpartiet)	7
Joint List(s) of Non-Socialist Parties (Borgerlige Felleslister)	2
Local List(s) (Lokale lister)	8
Total number of members:	17

Gamvik kommunestyre 1967–1971
Party name (in Norwegian)	Number of representatives
Labour Party (Arbeiderpartiet)	7
List of workers, fishermen, and small farmholders (Arbeidere, fiskere, småbrukere liste)	8
Joint List(s) of Non-Socialist Parties (Borgerlige Felleslister)	2
Total number of members:	17

Gamvik kommunestyre 1963–1967
Party name (in Norwegian)	Number of representatives
Labour Party (Arbeiderpartiet)	8
Conservative Party (Høyre)	1
Liberal Party (Venstre)	1
List of workers, fishermen, and small farmholders (Arbeidere, fiskere, småbrukere liste)	7
Total number of members:	17

Gamvik herredsstyre 1959–1963
Party name (in Norwegian)	Number of representatives
Labour Party (Arbeiderpartiet)	5
List of workers, fishermen, and small farmholders (Arbeidere, fiskere, småbrukere liste)	11
Local List(s) (Lokale lister)	1
Total number of members:	17

Gamvik herredsstyre 1955–1959
Party name (in Norwegian)	Number of representatives
List of workers, fishermen, and small farmholders (Arbeidere, fiskere, småbrukere liste)	3
Local List(s) (Lokale lister)	14
Total number of members:	17

Gamvik herredsstyre 1951–1955
Party name (in Norwegian)	Number of representatives
List of workers, fishermen, and small farmholders (Arbeidere, fiskere, småbrukere liste)	3
Local List(s) (Lokale lister)	13
Total number of members:	16

Gamvik herredsstyre 1947–1951
Party name (in Norwegian)	Number of representatives
Labour Party (Arbeiderpartiet)	6
List of workers, fishermen, and small farmholders (Arbeidere, fiskere, småbrukere liste)	9
Local List(s) (Lokale lister)	1
Total number of members:	16

Gamvik herredsstyre 1945–1947
Party name (in Norwegian)	Number of representatives
List of workers, fishermen, and small farmholders (Arbeidere, fiskere, småbrukere liste)	16
Total number of members:	16

Gamvik herredsstyre 1937–1941*
Party name (in Norwegian)	Number of representatives
Labour Party (Arbeiderpartiet)	10
Joint List(s) of Non-Socialist Parties (Borgerlige Felleslister)	6
Total number of members:	16
Note: Due to the German occupation of Norway during World War II, no elections were held for new municipal councils until after the war ended in 1945.

=== Mayors ===
The mayor (Norwegian: ordfører) of Gamvik Municipality is the political leader of the municipality and the chairperson of the municipal council. Here is a list of people who have held this position:

- 1914–1920: Fredrik Forberg
- 1920–1923: Hans Schanche
- 1923–1926: Andreas M. Irgens (H)
- 1926–1927: Fredrik Forberg
- 1927–1935: Leonhard Grønhaug (Ap)
- 1935–1937: Harald Lunde (Ap)
- 1938–1941: Hjalmar Bellika (Ap)
- 1941–1945: Andreas M. Irgens (H)
- 1945–1947: Hjalmar Bellika (Ap)
- 1947–1964: Ragnvald Mathisen (Ap)
- 1965–1968: Birger Bertheussen (Ap)
- 1968–1979: Bjarne Jensen (Ap)
- 1979–1983: Tora Høgestøl (LL)
- 1983–1987: Bjarne Jensen (Ap)
- 1987–2007: Roger Leif Hansen (Ap)
- 2007–2011: Marius Nilsen (Ap)
- 2011–2015: Inga Manndal (SV)
- 2015–2019: Trond Einar Olaussen (Ap)
- 2019–2023: Alf Normann Hansen (SV)
- 2023–present: Ragnhlid Vassvik (Ap)

== Geography ==
The municipality consists of the eastern half of the Nordkinn Peninsula. Kinnarodden, located in Gamvik, is the northernmost point of mainland Europe (the more well-known North Cape is located nearby on Magerøya island). The Tanafjorden flows along the eastern coast of Gamvik. Lebesby Municipality is located to the west and Tana Municipality is located to the south. Across the fjord to the east is Berlevåg Municipality. The highest point in the municipality is the 672.3-metre (2,206 ft) tall mountain Duolbagáisá.

=== Climate ===
The inhabited places of Gamvik, such as Mehamn, has a boreal climate (Köppen climate classification: Dfc). The spring is very late to warm up and is among the coldest in Norway. Summers are short and cool. Winters are moderated by the Barents Sea and only slightly colder than in the capital Oslo. However, winds can be strong in winter. Slettnes Lighthouse, located on an exposed headland in the northern part of the municipality, is the only remaining weather station in mainland Norway with a tundra climate with the 1991-2020 normals. The all-time high in Gamvik municipality is 32.2 °C (90.0 °F) recorded at Slettnes Lighthouse in July 1972, and the second warmest is 31.4 °C (88.5 °F) recorded at Slettnes in July 2018. The all-time low in Gamvik is −23.1 °C (−9.6 °F) recorded February 1985 at Slettnes. Overnight freezes are very rare in summer and has never happened in July. The coldest low in August at Mehamn Airport is −0.7 °C (30.7 °F) recorded 2012, while the coldest August overnight low at Slettnes is 1.4 °C (34.5 °F) from 1984.

Climate data for Mehamn Airport 1991-2020 (13 m, precipitation from Slettnes)
Month	Jan	Feb	Mar	Apr	May	Jun	Jul	Aug	Sep	Oct	Nov	Dec	Year
Mean daily maximum °C (°F)	−2 (28)	−2 (28)	−1 (30)	3 (37)	7 (45)	10 (50)	14 (57)	13 (55)	11 (52)	5 (41)	2 (36)	0 (32)	5 (41)
Daily mean °C (°F)	−4.1 (24.6)	−4.6 (23.7)	−2.9 (26.8)	−0.1 (31.8)	3.6 (38.5)	7.5 (45.5)	11 (52)	10.5 (50.9)	7.7 (45.9)	2.9 (37.2)	−0.8 (30.6)	−2.5 (27.5)	2.3 (36.2)
Mean daily minimum °C (°F)	−6 (21)	−6 (21)	−5 (23)	−2 (28)	2 (36)	6 (43)	9 (48)	9 (48)	6 (43)	1 (34)	−2 (28)	−4 (25)	1 (33)
Average precipitation mm (inches)	55.4 (2.18)	56.2 (2.21)	56.7 (2.23)	37.7 (1.48)	38.9 (1.53)	46.6 (1.83)	49.2 (1.94)	58.2 (2.29)	61.2 (2.41)	70.4 (2.77)	59.2 (2.33)	51.8 (2.04)	641.5 (25.24)
Source 1: yr.no/Norwegian Meteorological Institute
Source 2: Weatheronline.co.uk

Climate data for Slettnes Lighthouse 1991-2020 (8 m)
Month	Jan	Feb	Mar	Apr	May	Jun	Jul	Aug	Sep	Oct	Nov	Dec	Year
Record high °C (°F)	7.3 (45.1)	6.2 (43.2)	7.2 (45.0)	13.6 (56.5)	19.8 (67.6)	24.0 (75.2)	31.4 (88.5)	30.3 (86.5)	22.2 (72.0)	16.0 (60.8)	9.5 (49.1)	7.6 (45.7)	31.4 (88.5)
Mean daily maximum °C (°F)	−0.6 (30.9)	−1.2 (29.8)	−0.2 (31.6)	2.1 (35.8)	5.9 (42.6)	8.8 (47.8)	12.0 (53.6)	12.1 (53.8)	9.7 (49.5)	5.2 (41.4)	2.1 (35.8)	0.7 (33.3)	4.7 (40.5)
Daily mean °C (°F)	−3.2 (26.2)	−3.6 (25.5)	−2.3 (27.9)	0.2 (32.4)	3.8 (38.8)	6.7 (44.1)	9.6 (49.3)	9.9 (49.8)	7.7 (45.9)	3.4 (38.1)	0.0 (32.0)	−1.6 (29.1)	2.6 (36.7)
Mean daily minimum °C (°F)	−5.9 (21.4)	−6.4 (20.5)	−4.8 (23.4)	−1.9 (28.6)	1.8 (35.2)	5.0 (41.0)	7.8 (46.0)	8.0 (46.4)	5.7 (42.3)	1.3 (34.3)	−2.3 (27.9)	−4.2 (24.4)	0.3 (32.5)
Record low °C (°F)	−20.9 (−5.6)	−19.8 (−3.6)	−16.7 (1.9)	−12.8 (9.0)	−7.1 (19.2)	−2.8 (27.0)	3.6 (38.5)	2.3 (36.1)	−1.6 (29.1)	−9.5 (14.9)	−13.5 (7.7)	−16.8 (1.8)	−20.9 (−5.6)
Average precipitation mm (inches)	53.3 (2.10)	51.9 (2.04)	48.5 (1.91)	34.9 (1.37)	32.7 (1.29)	44.8 (1.76)	45.9 (1.81)	55.2 (2.17)	59.1 (2.33)	68.1 (2.68)	50.3 (1.98)	48.7 (1.92)	593.5 (23.37)
Average precipitation days (≥ 1 mm)	14.2	12.6	12.5	9.6	10.1	9.0	8.8	10.1	13.1	16.6	12.8	12.5	141.9
Source: Norwegian Meteorological Institute (precipitation 1991-2005)

Climate data for Slettnes Lighthouse 1961-1990
Month	Jan	Feb	Mar	Apr	May	Jun	Jul	Aug	Sep	Oct	Nov	Dec	Year
Mean daily maximum °C (°F)	−1.9 (28.6)	−2.0 (28.4)	−1.1 (30.0)	1.0 (33.8)	4.7 (40.5)	8.7 (47.7)	11.9 (53.4)	11.3 (52.3)	8.7 (47.7)	4.3 (39.7)	1.2 (34.2)	−0.8 (30.6)	3.8 (38.8)
Daily mean °C (°F)	−4.4 (24.1)	−4.5 (23.9)	−3.1 (26.4)	−0.8 (30.6)	2.8 (37.0)	6.3 (43.3)	9.3 (48.7)	9.2 (48.6)	6.7 (44.1)	2.5 (36.5)	−0.9 (30.4)	−3.2 (26.2)	1.7 (35.1)
Mean daily minimum °C (°F)	−7.3 (18.9)	−7.4 (18.7)	−5.8 (21.6)	−3.2 (26.2)	0.8 (33.4)	4.3 (39.7)	7.3 (45.1)	7.2 (45.0)	4.7 (40.5)	0.3 (32.5)	−3.4 (25.9)	−5.9 (21.4)	−0.7 (30.7)
Average precipitation mm (inches)	47 (1.9)	37 (1.5)	35 (1.4)	34 (1.3)	36 (1.4)	37 (1.5)	45 (1.8)	46 (1.8)	53 (2.1)	67 (2.6)	56 (2.2)	46 (1.8)	539 (21.2)
Average precipitation days (≥ 1 mm)	13.2	10.7	10.5	10.0	9.5	9.4	9.1	10.4	13.4	15.7	14.4	13.8	140.1
Source: Norwegian Meteorological Institute

=== Birdlife ===
The area surrounding the lighthouse at Slettnes is also an interesting locality for those interested in birds and birdwatching. There is a nature reserve and bird observatory.

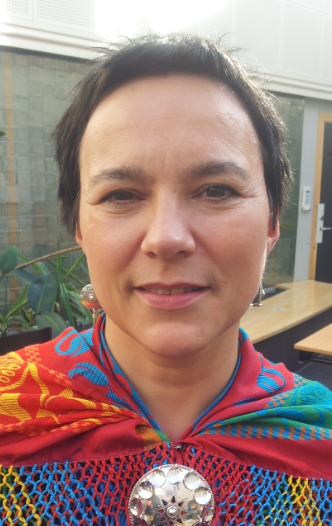
Ragnhild Vassvik Kalstad, 2012

== Notable people ==
- Tor Henriksen (1933 in Gamvik – 2017), a politician for the Socialist Left Party
- Torgeir Vassvik (born 1963), a Sami musician and composer
- Ragnhild Vassvik Kalstad (born 1966 in Gamvik), a politician for the Labour Party
- Eivind Eriksen (born 1973 in Mehamn), a former footballer with over 150 club caps
