= Berlevåg =

Berlevåg or Berlevaag may refer to:

== Places ==
- Berlevåg (village), a village in Berlevåg Municipality in Finnmark county, Norway
- Berlevåg Municipality, a municipality in Finnmark county, Norway
- Berlevåg Airport, an airport in Berlevåg Municipality in Finnmark county, Norway
- Berlevåg Church, a church in Berlevåg Municipality in Finnmark county, Norway

== People ==
- Amoque von Berlevaag, a heavy metal musician
