= Skonsvikvatnan =

Lake in Berlevåg, Norway

- Interactive map of the lake
- Location: Berlevåg, Finnmark
- Coordinates: 70.8706°N 28.9686°E
- Basin countries: Norway
- Surface elevation: 8 metres (26 ft)
- References: NVE

Skonsvikvatnan is a small lake located along the coast of northern Norway. It is located in Berlevåg Municipality, northwest of the village of Berlevåg in Finnmark county. The lake is located about 2 kilometres (1.2 mi) west of Berlevåg Airport.

== See also ==
- List of lakes in Norway
