= Geatnjajávri =

Lake in Berlevåg municipality, Norway

- Interactive map of the lake
- Location: Berlevåg Municipality, Finnmark
- Coordinates: 70.4946°N 29.1165°E
- Basin countries: Norway
- Max. length: 5.4 kilometres (3.4 mi)
- Max. width: 3.2 kilometres (2.0 mi)
- Surface area: 4.83 km^{2} (1.86 sq mi)
- Shore length^{1}: 14.24 kilometres (8.85 mi)
- Surface elevation: 229 metres (751 ft)
- References: NVE
- ^{1} Shore length is not a well-defined measure.

Geatnjajávri is a lake in Berlevåg Municipality in Finnmark county, Norway. The lake is located just north of the border with Tana Municipality, along the road between the villages of Berlevåg and Båtsfjord. The Norwegian County Road 890 crosses over the lake on a causeway and bridge on the western side of the lake. The lake has a dam on the northern end and the water eventually flows out into the river Kongsfjordelva.

== See also ==
- List of lakes in Norway
