= Widerøe Flight 933 =

1982 aviation accident, Norwegian DHC-6

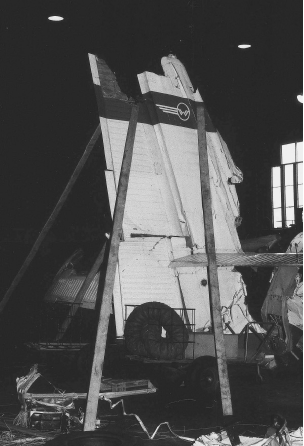
- The vertical stabilizer of the accident aircraft after it was recovered from the sea

Accident
- Date: 11 March 1982
- Summary: Vertical stabilizer and rudder structural failure during severe clear-air turbulence
- Site: Barents Sea near Gamvik, Norway; 71°01′01″N 028°21′00″E

Aircraft
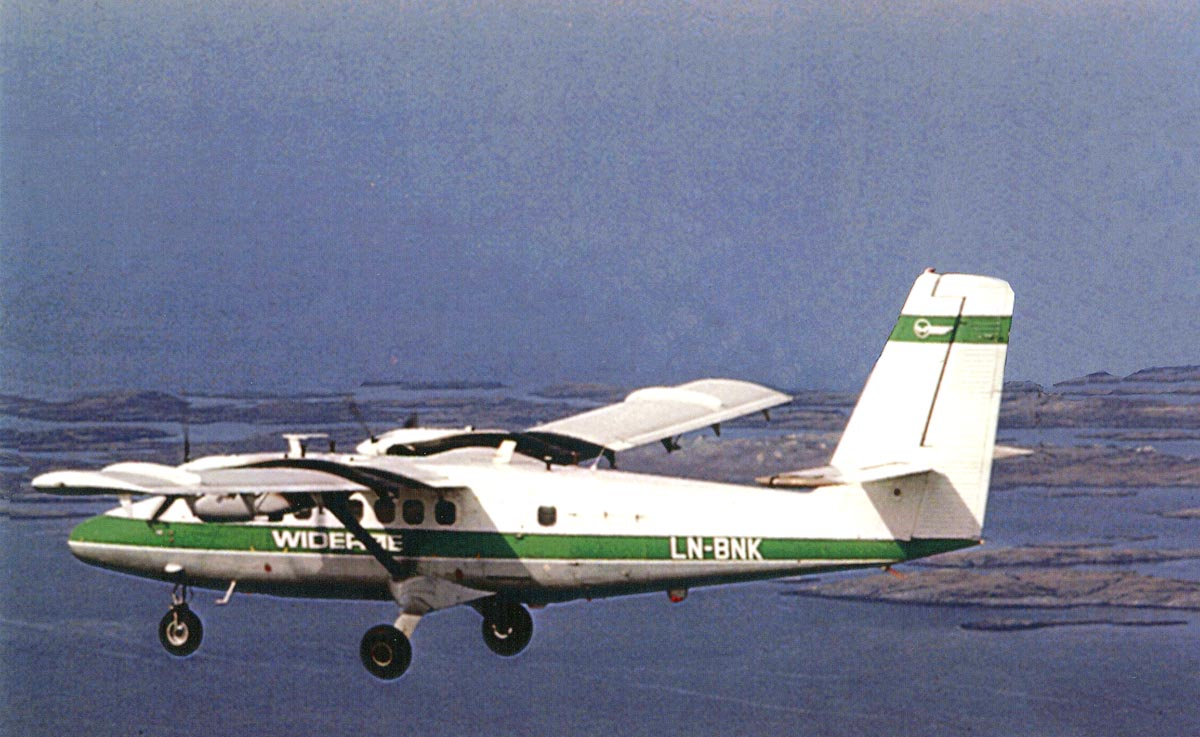
- LN-BNK, The accident aircraft involved, seen in 1970
- Aircraft type: De Havilland Canada DHC-6 Twin Otter
- Operator: Widerøe
- Registration: LN-BNK
- Flight origin: Kirkenes Airport, Høybuktmoen
- 1st stopover: Vadsø Airport
- 2nd stopover: Berlevåg Airport
- 3rd stopover: Mehamn Airport
- 4th stopover: Honningsvåg Airport, Valan
- Destination: Alta Airport
- Occupants: 15
- Passengers: 13
- Crew: 2
- Fatalities: 15
- Survivors: 0

Widerøe Flight 933, also known as the Mehamn Accident (Norwegian: Mehamn-ulykken), was the crash of a de Havilland Canada DHC-6 Twin Otter operated by Norwegian airline Widerøe. The Twin Otter crashed into the Barents Sea off Gamvik, Norway on 11 March 1982 at 13:27, killing all 15 people on board. The results of the four official investigations were that the accident was caused by structural failure of the vertical stabilizer (Note: Also called the vertical fin, the vertical stabilizer is part of the empennage or tail. The aircraft's rudder is mounted on the rear of the vertical stabilizer.) during clear-air turbulence. A mechanical fault in the elevator control system caused the pilots to lose control of pitch; and either a series of stalls or a high-speed gust of wind caused the aircraft to lose altitude without the ability of the crew to counteract, resulting in the failure of the vertical stabilizer.

The accident occurred during a NATO military exercise, within a self-declared no-fly zone for allied military aircraft. An extensive search and rescue operation was carried out and the submerged wreck was found on 13 March. The aircraft and all but one of the deceased were retrieved. An official investigation was concluded on 20 July 1984.

A conspiracy theory later emerged after the accident investigation was concluded, claiming that the accident was caused by a mid-air collision with a Harrier jump jet of the British Royal Air Force. The theory is based on reports which emerged years or decades after the accident. The claims and renewed press interest resulted in three additional investigations, established in 1987, 1997, and 2002. All four investigations came to the same general conclusions and rejected a collision.

== Aircraft ==
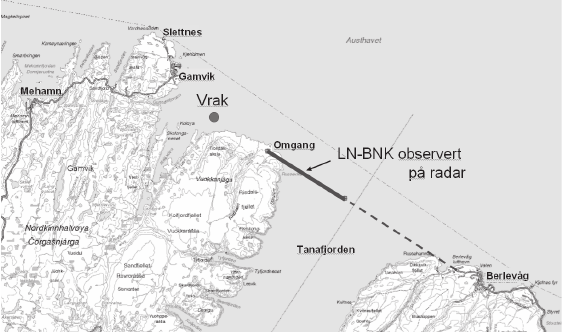
Map of Flight 933's route. The thick line is the route followed by radar; "vrak" is where the wreckage was found

The accident aircraft was a 19-passenger de Havilland Canada DHC-6 Twin Otter, registration LN-BNK. It was built by de Havilland Canada in 1977, delivered new to Widerøe and registered in Norway on 9 February 1978. The aircraft had been damaged by jet blast from a Douglas DC-9 at Tromsø Airport in March 1980, after which the rudder was replaced. Beyond this, the Twin Otter had not been subject to any other extraordinary incidents. It had met all requirements regarding maintenance and certification and had operated for about 10,000 hours at the time of the accident.

== Flight ==
Widerøe Flight 933 was a scheduled service from Kirkenes Airport, Høybuktmoen to Alta Airport, with intermediate stops at Vadsø Airport, Berlevåg Airport, Mehamn Airport and Honningsvåg Airport, Valan. Captain Peer Christian Hovring was aged 38 and First Officer Hans Breines was 26 years old. The aircraft had thirteen passengers on board, including two children, when departing Berlevåg. The weather was clear, but with a strong wind from the south. The captain chose to fly with visual flight rules. Other aircraft that passed through the accident area after Widerøe Flight 933 experienced strong turbulence between 1,000 feet (300 m) and 1,500 feet (460 m) (Note: Aircraft use feet as the unit of measure for altitude instead of meters) in altitude.

On 11 March 1982 the Twin Otter left Berlevåg at 13:19 – 11 minutes early, thus causing one passenger to miss the flight. The first officer reported to Mehamn Aerodrome Flight Information Service (AFIS) at 13:22 that the aircraft was at 2,000 feet (610 m) altitude over the Tanafjord and had an estimated time of arrival of 13:33. Radio contact ended at 13:22:53. The flight path was monitored by an officer at the Royal Norwegian Air Force (RNoAF) control and reporting center in Honningsvåg between 13:23:20 and 13:25:25, after which the aircraft no longer appeared on radar. The officer at the RNoAF center presumed that the aircraft had fallen below the radar horizon of 1,200 feet (366 m) in altitude.

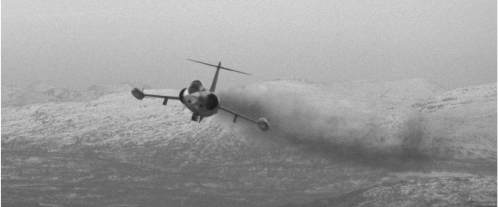
A CF-104 Starfighter during the search for LN-BNK

Mehamn AFIS radioed Flight 933 at 13:35:52 but received no answer. After several attempts, Mehamn AFIS contacted Berlevåg AFIS and Kirkenes Airport, which also failed to make radio contact. A Widerøe aircraft en route from Honningsvåg to Mehamn also attempted to make contact. The Joint Rescue Coordination Centre of Northern Norway was informed of the situation at 13:41 and immediately coordinated a search and rescue operation. Three groups of the Norwegian Red Cross Search and Rescue Corps were dispatched and ten ships in the area volunteered to assist in the search. They were supplemented by two search and rescue vessels from the Norwegian Society for Sea Rescue (NSSR); the Royal Norwegian Navy diving vessel Draug; and the Norwegian Coast Guard vessel Horten.

Two RNoAF CF-104 Starfighters and a Westland Sea King at Banak Air Station participated in the search along with two other military helicopters, as did a Twin Otter of Widerøe and an aircraft of Norwegian airline Norving. Parts of the crashed aircraft were found at about 18:00 on the day of the crash. The breakthrough came at 17:39 on 13 March, when an NSSR vessel found the wreck at 45 meters (150 ft) depth, 1.1 kilometres (0.7 mi) north of Teistbergan. The following day two police divers explored the site and confirmed it was the missing aircraft. One of the divers suffered from decompression sickness, which caused a lifelong brain injury and subsequent disability.

A troop of divers arrived from Ramsund Naval Base that evening and started bringing up the bodies. The last body was retrieved on 20 March. Everyone except the captain was found, although one body was located 300 meters (1,000 ft) from the wreck. As the passengers would have been exposed to a force of 50 to 100 g at the time of impact, they would all have died instantly. Widerøe paid a maximum compensation of 330,000 Norwegian krone (NOK) per casualty, costing the airline between NOK 4 and 5 million.

== Cause ==
Investigation of the wreckage showed that, prior to the accident, there were cracks in the torque tube connecting the port elevator to the elevator control system. Widerøe, de Havilland Canada, and the initial investigation commission were of an opinion that this was irrelevant to the accident, while Transport Canada and the Swedish National Defence Research Institute were of the opinion that this caused a weakening in the structure. The accident area was suffering from strong clear-weather turbulence up to 6,000 feet (1,800 m) altitude. The wind speed was comparable to the levels used to certify the aircraft. Twin Otter pilots from both Widerøe and the RNoAF confirmed that control of the aircraft's altitude could be difficult in conditions of strong turbulence.

It is possible that the turbulence caused the torque tube driving the port elevator to break; this would allow the port elevator to move freely, but the pilots would still retain approximately half of their attitude control. The aircraft also had a defective push–pull rod and worn steering cables, although it is not certain if this was part of the cause.

The direct cause of the accident is presumed to be the collapse of the vertical stabilizer. There are two alternative explanations for how the crash may have happened. The first explanation is the lack of vertical control caused by the broken elevator torque tube stalled the aircraft. Because of the lack of pitch control, it would have been easy for the aircraft to fall back into a stall repeatedly, each time losing altitude. The aircraft would thus eventually have fallen into the sea. The vertical fin and rudder would have broken off on impact. This theory does not explain why the vertical stabilizer was found at such a distance from the aircraft.

The second explanation is based on the aircraft reaching a speed of at least 180 knots (210 mph; 330 km/h), (Note: Aircraft use knots (nautical miles per hour) as the unit of measure of airspeed) compared to the aircraft's ordinary cruise speed of 140 knots (160 mph; 260 km/h). This is possible under extreme wind conditions, given that the pilots had lost the use of the elevator. Simulations show that each gust of wind had a 0.5 percent possibility of the rudder breaking, and the last commission of inquiry found that it was likely that the aircraft could have been hit by at least ten such gusts. This alternative explains why the vertical stabilizer was found at such a distance from the aircraft.

== Military activity ==
NATO was carrying out the military exercise "Alloy Express" in Northern Norway from 24 February to 24 March 1982. The exercise was practicing the deployment of NATO forces into Northern Norway in response to a Soviet invasion. Among the aircraft participating were RNoAF F-5 Freedom Fighters, F-104 Starfighters and F-16 Fighting Falcons, as well as United States Air Force F-4 Phantom IIs and F-15 Eagles. The Royal Navy's aircraft carrier HMS Invincible was anchored in Vestfjorden and her Sea Harriers were participating, as were a detachment of Hawker Siddeley Harriers of No. 1 Squadron RAF flying out of Tromsø Airport. Norwegian policy prohibited any NATO aircraft from operating east of the 24th meridian east, unless they had explicit permission from the government; no such permission was granted for "Alloy Express".

A map showing relevant sites related to Flight 933 and military activity in the area

On the day of the accident, two Harriers flew on missions from Tromsø, named Red 1 and Red 2. The first was the two-seat Harrier serial number XW925 with Wing Commander Peter Squire as a pilot and Norwegian Major Bjørnar Vollstad. The aircraft left Tromsø at 14:27, nearly an hour after the crash. They flew to a gunnery range near Setermoen, followed by Red 2, a Harrier GR.3. The shooting range was enveloped in a blizzard, but Squire chose to carry out the practice. Red 1 was subject to an air burst; Squire did not register any damage, but chose to return to Tromsø and asked for a priority landing to be on the safe side. The pilot of Red 2 believed his weapons were not secured and chose to carry out a priority landing at Bardufoss Air Station, located nearby.

Breaching of the 24th meridian policy by military aircraft during exercises would be discovered by the control and reporting centers, which would order the aircraft to turn back. Any incidents would be logged at Control and Reporting Centre Sørreisa (CRC) and at the radar station tracking the aircraft. During an exercise three years later on 13 March 1985, two Sea Harriers from HMS Invincible, then anchored off Andøya, were recorded as being 150 kilometers (93 mi) inside the no-fly zone, comparatively close to the 1982 site of Invincible. This was the only incident that the parliamentary commission was able to verify. The commission's members carried out interviews with dozens of civilian and military air traffic controllers, pilots and boat skippers; none had ever observed foreign aircraft in the no-fly zone, although all had heard rumors of such activity. The commission concluded that alleged frequent breaches of the zone were the result of an urban legend.

== Investigations ==
=== First investigation ===
The first investigation was carried out by a military commission, led by Lieutenant General Wilhelm Mohr and consisting of Captain Stein I. Eriksen, Police Inspector Liv Daae Gabrielsen, and pilot Hallvard Vikholt. The wreckage was salvaged by MS Hugo Trygvasson starting on 16 March. The pieces of wreckage were hoisted on board and stored before being freighted to a hangar at Bodø Airport, where the investigation was carried out. Lack of space on board the ship meant that the wreckage was stored in a heap and could have suffered damage during loading and transport. Some of the technical analyses of the aircraft's components were carried out by de Havilland Canada and by Transport Canada.

There was one eye-witness to the accident – Grete Mortensen, who was working outdoors at a kindergarten in Gamvik. Mortensen's comments were key to locating the aircraft after the crash. She stated that she heard a loud splash and informed the initial commission that "a while later" she saw a fighter jet in the area. The initial commission did not at the time ask for the time frame between her sightings of the two aircraft. In 1987 she specified that the fighter came about one to five minutes after the splash. The final commission stated that the later specification very well could have been influenced by the media reports. The last commission stated that the first commission's non-interest in following up on her comments was used by the media to raise doubt about the existence of a fighter in the area.

The first commission concluded that "vital parts of the vertical stabilizer had collapsed because of overload while still airborne ... making further control of the aircraft impossible". The conclusion was unanimous and was presented at a press conference at Mehamn on 20 July 1984. The Norwegian Broadcasting Corporation's (NRK) main news program, Dagsrevyen, chose to emphasize the part of the report which was deemed newsworthy – that the captain had taken medicine without permission from an authorized aviation physician. Part of the story had pictures of medications and the program gave the impression that the commission was placing part of the blame on the captain, while in reality there were no such conclusions in the report.

=== Second investigation ===
Eastern Finnmark is located close to the then Norway–Soviet Union border, with large military activity on both sides. The Cold War forced secrecy regarding military installations – for instance the ranges of military radar systems – which caused certain details to not be revealed in the commission's report. Various historical events caused people in Finnmark to have a more skeptical attitude towards authorities. Quickly after the accident there began to circulate rumors about various details of the salvaging operations; which were subsequently easy to verify as not being true. The fourth commission found that there were dozens of smaller and larger rumors and observations which were reported by witnesses; which were easy to prove as false, often because the people in question were not at the place in question on the date of the accident.

A public debate about the cause of the accident arose after the report, in part because of sightings of fighter jets. Such reports had been appearing in the media since shortly after the accident. Fremover reported in January 1987 that radar had observed an unidentified aircraft which was on a collision course with the Twin Otter. The issue escalated with the captain's brother, Widerøe's chief pilot John Hovring, stating that the crash must have occurred as a result of a collision with a fighter or missile. He further stated that General Mohr as an air force officer had a vested interest in covering up the real cause.

The government therefore appointed three new members to the commission on 6 February 1987 and ordered a new investigation of the accident. The new members were Appeal Judge Christian Borchsenius, Erik Øie of the Norwegian Civil Aviation Administration, and Professor Janne Carlzon of the Royal Institute of Technology in Stockholm. The expanded commission was ordered to especially look into three issues: all air movements in the area at the time; how the crack in the torque tube was caused; and the use of medication by the pilot.

The commission carried out investigations of all traffic logs in the region, as well as interviews with several new people. It concluded in its report of 29 June 1988 that the existence of other aircraft in the area could be ruled out; and that no other airborne objects could have caused the accident. Beyond being more explicit in some technical aspects of the conclusions, the second commission agreed with the first. Mohr received several threats, including some to his life.

=== Third investigation ===
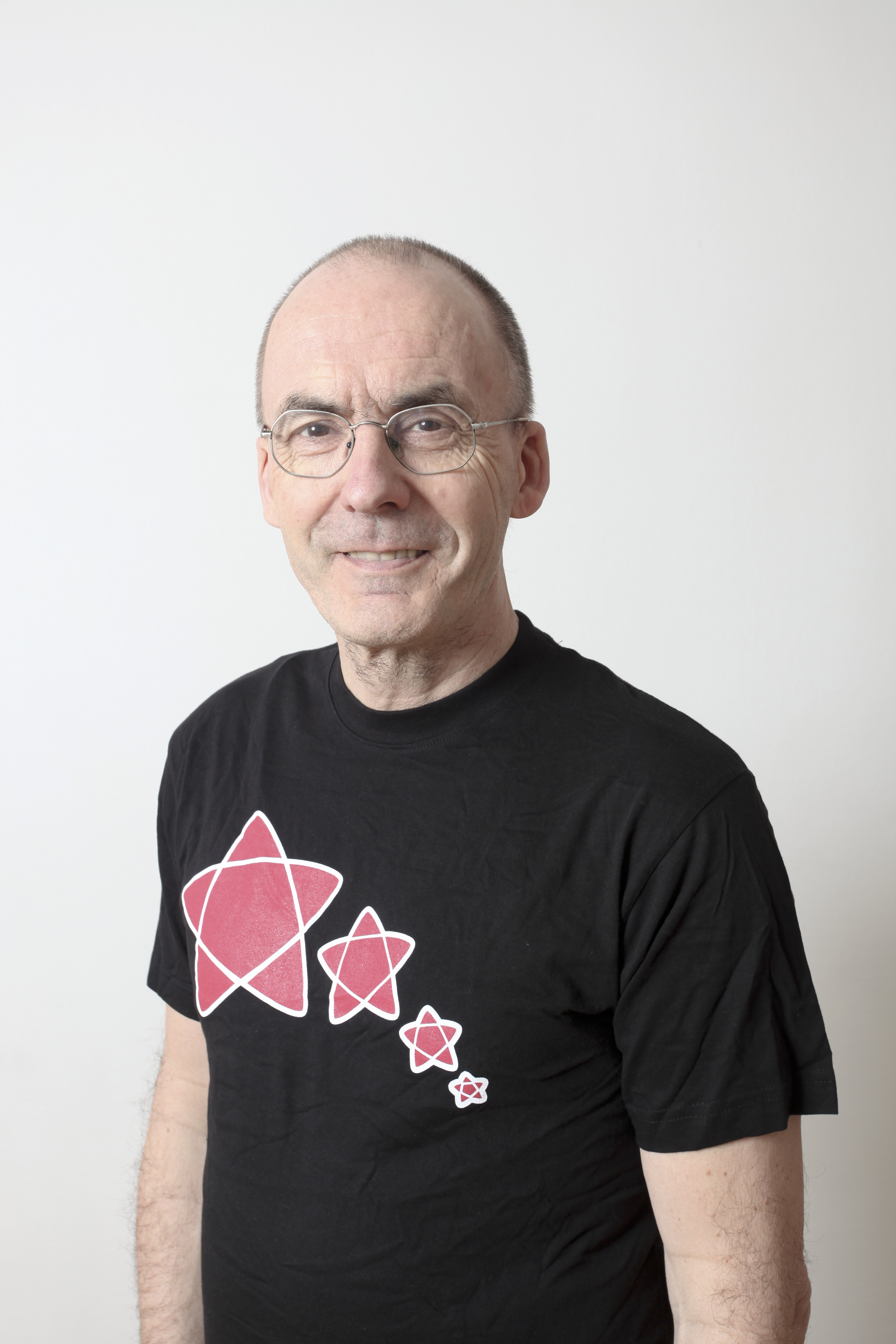
Erling Folkvord was a key to the appointment of the 1997 investigation

The debate about the accident resurfaced in 1997. The captain's nephew presented new evidence from an anonymous air force officer, later identified as Per Garvin. Parliamentarian Erling Folkvord (Red Electoral Alliance) subsequently raised questions about the accident in Parliament to the Minister of Transport and Communications regarding the investigation, and had a chapter in a book he wrote dedicated to the issue. His main assertion was that Mortensen's observation had not been investigated more carefully. The media also reported that the cause of the accident had never been found and that a damaged Harrier had landed in Tromsø the day of the accident.

The Accident Investigation Board Norway (AIBN) decided in 1997 to investigate the new claims. It investigated logs from airports and radar stations, but could not find any evidence of airborne aircraft at the time. In February a claim was raised that the logs at Tromsø Airport had been doctored; analysis showed that this was not the case. The AIBN concluded that there was no evidence to support the claims.

== Parliamentary investigation ==
On 19 November 2002 NRK's documentary series Brennpunkt broadcast the episode "Vanskelige vitner" ("Difficult Witnesses"). The program claimed it had new evidence regarding the accident, which conclusively showed that the Twin Otter had collided with a Harrier. It included an interview with former Lieutenant Colonel Per Garvin, in charge of CRC Sørreisa at the time. He claimed to have seen two Harriers fly into the no-fly zone on the day of the accident, combined with a comment that Harriers flying from Gamvik to Tromsø had been observed by witnesses all the way. The documentary's main researcher was former Widerøe pilot Ulf Larsstuvold, who had been a leading spokesperson favoring the Harrier theory.

This spurred a public debate about the incident; and subsequent debate in Parliament. It was first debated on 16 December 2002 and a new commission was appointed on 6 February 2003. Jurist Gaute Gregusson, former chief justice of Hålogaland Court of Appeal, was appointed the commission's chairman. Among the other seven members were former Bishop of Hålogaland, Ola Steinholt, as well as four experts in the areas of aerodynamics, radar, risk management and flight operations, including a professor and a pilot.

The commission conducted thirty open hearings and 219 witnesses were interviewed – all but three in open hearings. Between the three commissions, 309 people were interviewed. The commission held 35 meetings and interviewed British officials, as well as visited all relevant sites. It also considered all archived material from the first three investigations. The Chief of Defence of Norway declassified all military personnel from their professional secrecy regarding the incident. In addition, a number of documents with relevance to the case were declassified by the military. The aircraft wreckage had been buried after the initial investigation and it was therefore not possible for the fourth commission to investigate it. A search for parts was carried out in September 2003; a drop tank was found, but it was incompatible with those used by a Harrier.

=== Interviews and analysis ===
Per Garvin stated to the commission that he had observed aircraft in the no-fly zone on the day of the accident and had communicated with the station in Kautokeino which had also observed such aircraft. He stated that he had ordered his assistant to log the incident. Another operator gave evidence that he had observed Red 1 and Red 2 fly first from Tromsø to Setermoen and then northwards to Alta and Kautokeino, in the no-fly zone. No other employees at Sørreisa could recall any such incidents, and the logs showed that Garvin was not working on the day of the accident. Garvin never made any comments about Harriers during the 1980s and his statements between 1997 and 2003 changed from him airing a possibility to a certain fact.

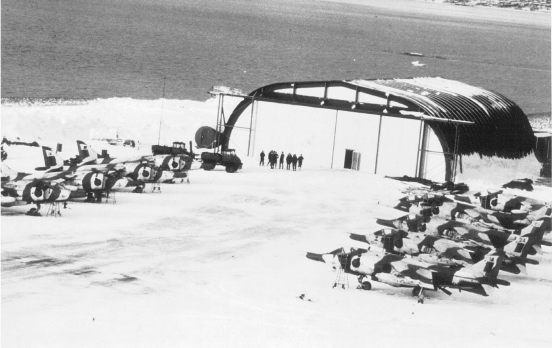
Royal Air Force Hawker Siddeley Harriers at Tromsø Airport during Exercise "Alloy Express" in 1982

An employee at Kautokeino claimed that he had observed allied aircraft in the no-fly zone on the day of the accident, but investigations showed that he was not working in Finnmark in March. Investigations of the logs at Kautokeino and Sørreisa showed no entries regarding any NATO air traffic. Captain Stein Aarbogh, working at Setermoen gunnery range, stated that on the day of the accident, two Harriers were expected, but showed up several hours late, at around five o'clock in the afternoon. Aarbogh was certain of whom was range officer at the gunnery range was on the day of the incident, but the commission could document that the person in question was working at Rygge Air Station on 11 March. Therefore, this incident could not have taken place on the day of the accident.

Four witnesses claimed to have observed fighter jets in the accident area. A fisherman stated that he saw a Twin Otter and a fighter jet at the same time in the area, but could not remember if it was before or after the accident, nor even if it was the same day. In case it was after the accident, he would have been observing two of the search aircraft. Some witnesses claimed to have seen a damaged Harrier at Bardufoss at the time of the accident. Some claimed the right wing was damaged, others the left wing or the belly. Some of the witnesses claimed there were remains of green paint on the aircraft. At the time of the accident, Widerøe did not have a dominant green paint scheme on its aircraft. The distance from Gamvik to Bardufoss is 430 kilometers (270 mi) and the Harrier would have to have flown out and back under radar coverage. A Harrier does not have sufficient fuel for such a round trip and the aircraft would have passed more than ten airports on the route from Gamvik to Bardufoss.

The report was published on 20 September 2005. It fully supported the findings of all three previous reports and found no evidence of an impact with a Harrier or any other aircraft. The conclusion was founded firstly in a full review of all logs and documentation and a full review of all technical analyses in the first reports. It concluded that all witnesses of fighter aircraft had made statements many years after the accident and that there was a high degree of uncertainty as to the time of their observations. Only the statement of Grete Mortensen could not be rejected, but the commission could not find that it showed any conclusive evidence either. The commission also found beyond doubt that no Harriers were airborne at the time of the accident. The commission also rejected that the captain's health had an influence on the crash and found that similar elevator control faults had occurred on other crashed Twin Otters.

=== Reaction ===
Despite the findings in the report, NRK stated that it stood by the position that its program documented a Harrier incident. Nordlys journalist Skjalg Fjellheim stated after the report that while he had applauded the documentary program at the time, he now characterized it as fiction. Bishop Steinholt of the commission stated that when he had originally seen the program, he had immediately thought "murder". On the day of the report he criticized NRK for broadcasting the documentary, stating that the program did not meet NRK's own requirements for objectivity and that it had cherrypicked witnesses and interviewees. The last commission stated that, of several independent journalists working over time, failure to find evidence of a collision strengthens the dismissal of the Harrier theory.

The documentary's researcher Ulf Larsstuvold stated that he believed that Parliament was acting as part of the cover-up and that the commission had secretly been instructed to conceal any evidence in support of the Harrier theory. Wera Dahle Jensen, who lost her husband in the accident, was the only next of kin to not have believed in the Harrier story. She stated after the final report that this had been an extra burden and that she had not been considered a party to the case. She was also concerned that the "fantastic stories" had put focus on aviation safety to the side, as Widerøe in later accidents also was found to not have a safety-minded culture.

Dagbladet journalist Kristoffer Egeberg commented that for the Harrier theory to be true, hundreds – if not a thousand – military-, police-, government- and civil aviation personnel would have to keep quiet. The sole purpose of a cover-up would be to protect a single British pilot and avoid the marginal discomfort of admitting that a NATO aircraft had flown in a self-imposed no-fly zone within Norwegian territory. The cover-up would have to be carried out over a period of two decades, also after the end of the Cold War. Both the manufacturer and the airline have accepted that the accident was caused by a mechanical failure. The Harrier theory is based on witnesses remembering intricate details up to two decades after the incident, which they had chosen to not inform the authorities or commission about during the initial investigation.

The cost of the parliamentary investigation was NOK 20 million. Parliament decided on 3 May 2006 to grant an ex gratia payment to the next of kin for the extra burden of having a new commission look into the case. The government decided in October 2006 to grant between NOK 50,000 and NOK 200,000 per person, totaling NOK 8.75 million.
