= Mehamn Airport =

Mehamn Airport Mehamn lufthavn

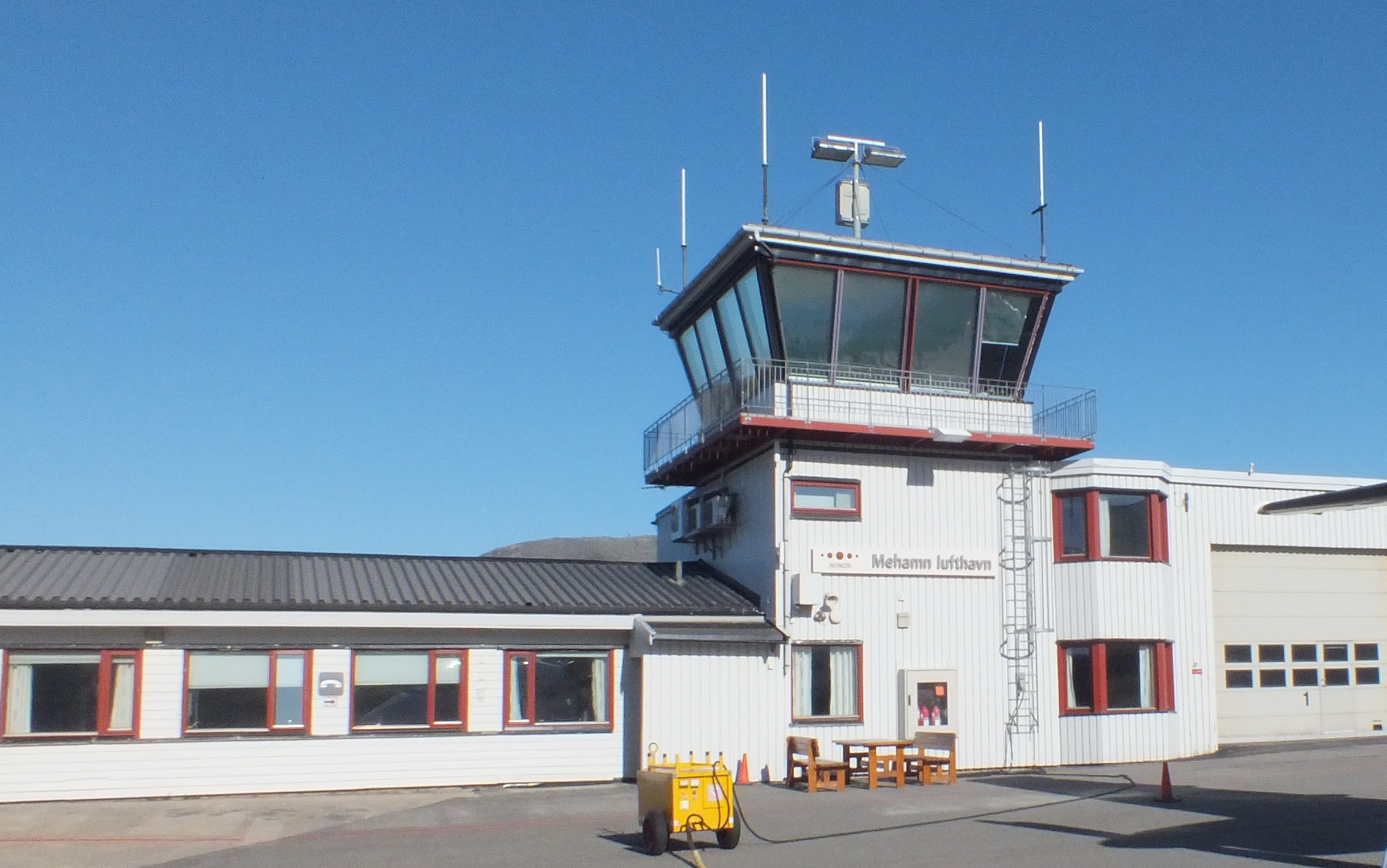
- IATA: MEH; ICAO: ENMH

Summary
- Airport type: Public
- Operator: Avinor
- Serves: Mehamn, Finnmark, Norway
- Elevation AMSL: 12 m / 39 ft
- Coordinates: 71°01′44″N 027°49′35″E
- Website: avinor.no

Map
- Location within Norway

Runways
Direction	Length		Surface
Direction	m	ft	Surface
17/35	880	2,887	Asphalt

Statistics (2012)
- Passengers: 14,392
- Aircraft movements: 2,789
- Cargo (tonnes): 4

Mehamn Airport (Norwegian: Mehamn lufthavn; IATA: MEH, ICAO: ENMH) is a regional airport serving the village of Mehamn in Gamvik Municipality in Finnmark county, Norway. It also serves the villages Kjøllefjord and Gamvik. The airport is 2 kilometers (1.2 mi) outside of the village of Mehamn and is owned and operated by the state-owned Avinor. The tower is remotely controlled from Bodø.

The asphalt runway is 880 meters (2,890 ft). Services are operated by Widerøe using Dash 8-100 aircraft which connect to other communities in Finnmark, and the city of Tromsø. The routes are subsidized by the Ministry of Transport and Communications through public service obligations.

Both the villages of Gamvik and Kjøllefjord were considered as alternative locations for the airport, and both received smaller airfields before Mehamn Airport opened in 1974. Widerøe operated de Havilland Canada Twin Otters until they were replaced with the Dash 8 in 1995. The airport served 14,392 passengers in 2014 and is the northernmost airport in Europe except Svalbard.

== History ==
Plans for an airport on Nordkinnhalvøya were first articulated by a committee appointed by the Finnmark County Municipality. Their 1966 report recommended that six regional airports be built in Finnmark, which included Mehamn and Kjøllefjord as a possible site. Simultaneously the national government starting on planning a national network of regional airports. The Civil Aviation Administration (later renamed Avinor) looked into suitable sites at Mehamn, Kjøllefjord, and Gamvik. The government prioritized construction in Finnmark last, so the regional airline Norving took initiative to build smaller airfields in selected communities. They took contact with both Lebesby Municipality and Gamvik Municipality to initiate construction.

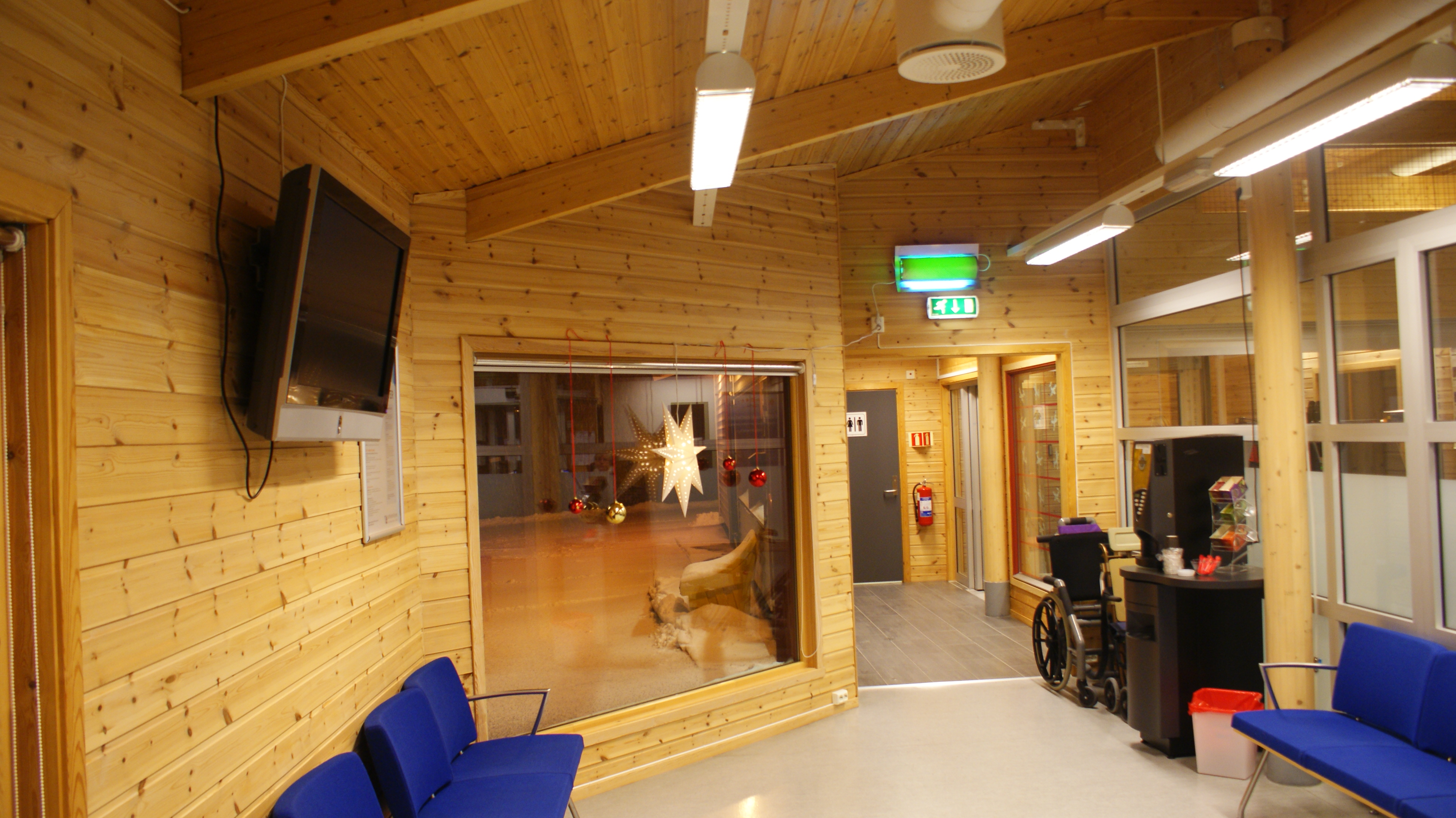
Landside part of the terminal

Initially the CAA supported Gamvik as a location for a regional airport, in part because of the lower investment costs. The municipal council in Gamvik instead chose the municipal center of Mehamn, 20 kilometers (12 mi) from Gamvik village. The Gamvik chapter of the Norwegian Red Cross Search and Rescue Corps started fund-raising for Gamvik village to build its own airport. It applied to the municipality, but no public funds were granted. Gamvik Airport opened on 29 August. Also at Kjøllefjord, 30 kilometers (19 mi) from Mehamn, locals decided to build their own airport. Kjøllefjord Airport opened in 1974, but because of the opening of Mehamn Airport it never saw any regular traffic. The use of the airports at Kjøllefjord and Gamvik fell out regular use from 1974 and were soon abandoned.

Simultaneously as Mehamn was awarded an airport, Parliament voted to build a new road, National Road 888, which would better winter transport between the villages of Kjøllefjord, Mehamn and Gamvik, allow Mehamn Airport to efficiently serve the entire peninsula. Construction was subcontracted to Veidekke. From they started construction in late 1973; it took 39 days from start until the first aircraft landed. Mehamn airport opened on 1 August 1974, at the same time as Sørkjosen Airport, Hammerfest Airport, Berlevåg Airport and Vadsø Airport. Because of late payment the airport remained owned by Veidekke until 1976. Both Widerøe and Norving applied to operate the Finnmark route, which would connect the airports together and to the primary airports in Finnmark and Tromsø Airport. Norving planned to operate with their Britten-Norman Islanders and Britten-Norman Trislanders. The government opted to selected Widerøe and their Twin Otters, citing the need for a single operator for all subsidized regional routes in the country.

Widerøe operated Twin Otters on the route until 1995, when the Dash 8 was introduced. The state and the Civil Aviation Administration took over ownership and operations of the airport from 1 January 1997, in exchange for 3.9 million kr being paid to Gamvik Municipality. Flights to Mehman have been subject to public service obligations since 1 April 1997. Airport security was introduced on 1 January 2005. The passenger terminal building has been expanded several times and a garage was built in 2005. The runway was expanded and a new lighting system was installed in 2011.

=== Future ===
Avinor sees a problem in getting new aircraft of the size of the Dash 8-100 (39 seats) which can use the 800 meter runways, so they plan to use smaller planes with 19 seats (which is the size of the Twin Otter) for these small airports when the Dash 8-100 retire before 2030.

== Facilities ==
The Avinor-owned airport has an integrated control tower and terminal capable of handling 70 passengers per hour. Mehamn has a 880-by-30-meter (2,887 by 98 ft) asphalt runway aligned 17–35 (roughly north–south). The terrain south of the runway is steep and hinders any future expansion of the runway and limits the weight of Dash 8 aircraft. The tarmac has parking to two Dash 8-sized aircraft. SCAT-I, a Global Positioning System-based landing system is under deployment. Parking and taxis are available at the airport, which is located 2 kilometers (1.2 mi) from the village of Mehamn. Mehamn Airport is the northernmost airport in Continental Europe.

== Airlines and destinations ==
Mehamn is served by Widerøe, which operates 39-seat Dash 8-100 and Q200 aircraft to other communities in Finnmark. The routes are operated as public service obligations financed by the Ministry of Transport and Communications. Many flights go to or from Tromsø or Kirkenes with several landings at other small airports.

Airlines	Destinations
Widerøe	Båtsfjord, Berlevåg, Hammerfest, Honningsvåg, Vadsø

== Statistics ==
The airport served 14,392 passengers, 2,789 aircraft movements and handled 4 tonnes of cargo in 2014.

Annual passenger traffic
Year	Passengers	% Change
2025	17,372	▲0.5%
2024	17,289	▼ -34.1%
2023	26,320	▲0.3%
2022	26,154	▲13.5%
2021	23,044	▲32.4%
2020	17,408	▼ -25.2%
2019	23,261	▼ -1.1%
2018	23,529	▼ -1.1%
2017	23,794	▼ -2.9%
2016	24,512	▲7.4%
2015	22,813	

== Accidents and incidents ==
On 11 March 1982, Widerøe Flight 933 crashed into the Barents Sea between Berlevåg Airport and Mehamn Airport, killing all fifteen people on board the Twin Otter. The accident was caused by structural failure in the rudder and vertical stabilizer following severe clear-air turbulence. A conspiracy theory arose concerning a collision with a British Harrier fighter, which resulted in four investigations—none of which found any evidence of a collision.

== Bibliography ==
- Melling, Kjersti (2009). Nordavind fra alle kanter (in Norwegian). Oslo: Pilotforlaget.
