= Kongsfjord =

Village in Berlevåg municipality, Norway

Coordinates: 70°43′N 29°19′E

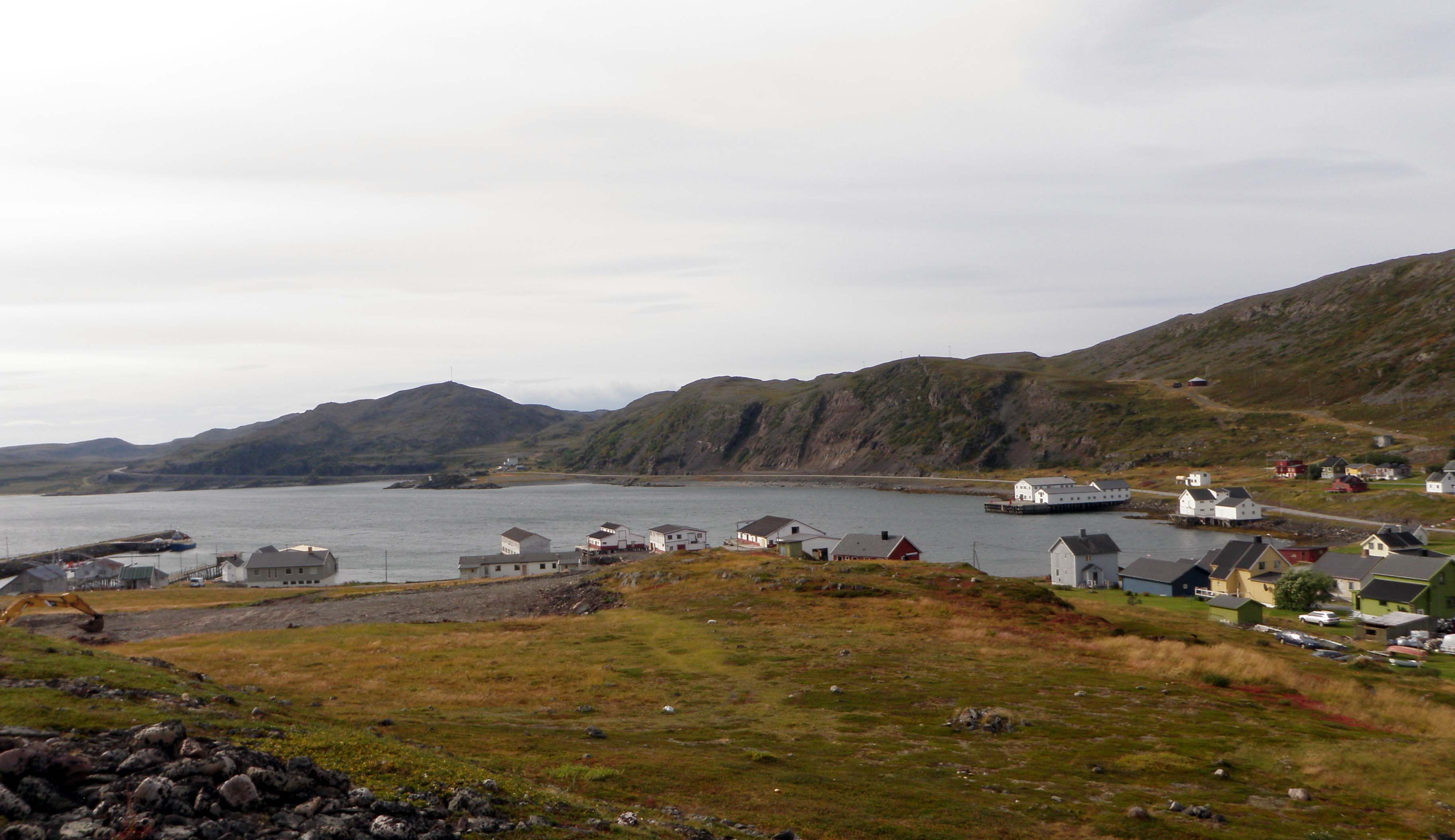
Seaside area of Kongsfjord

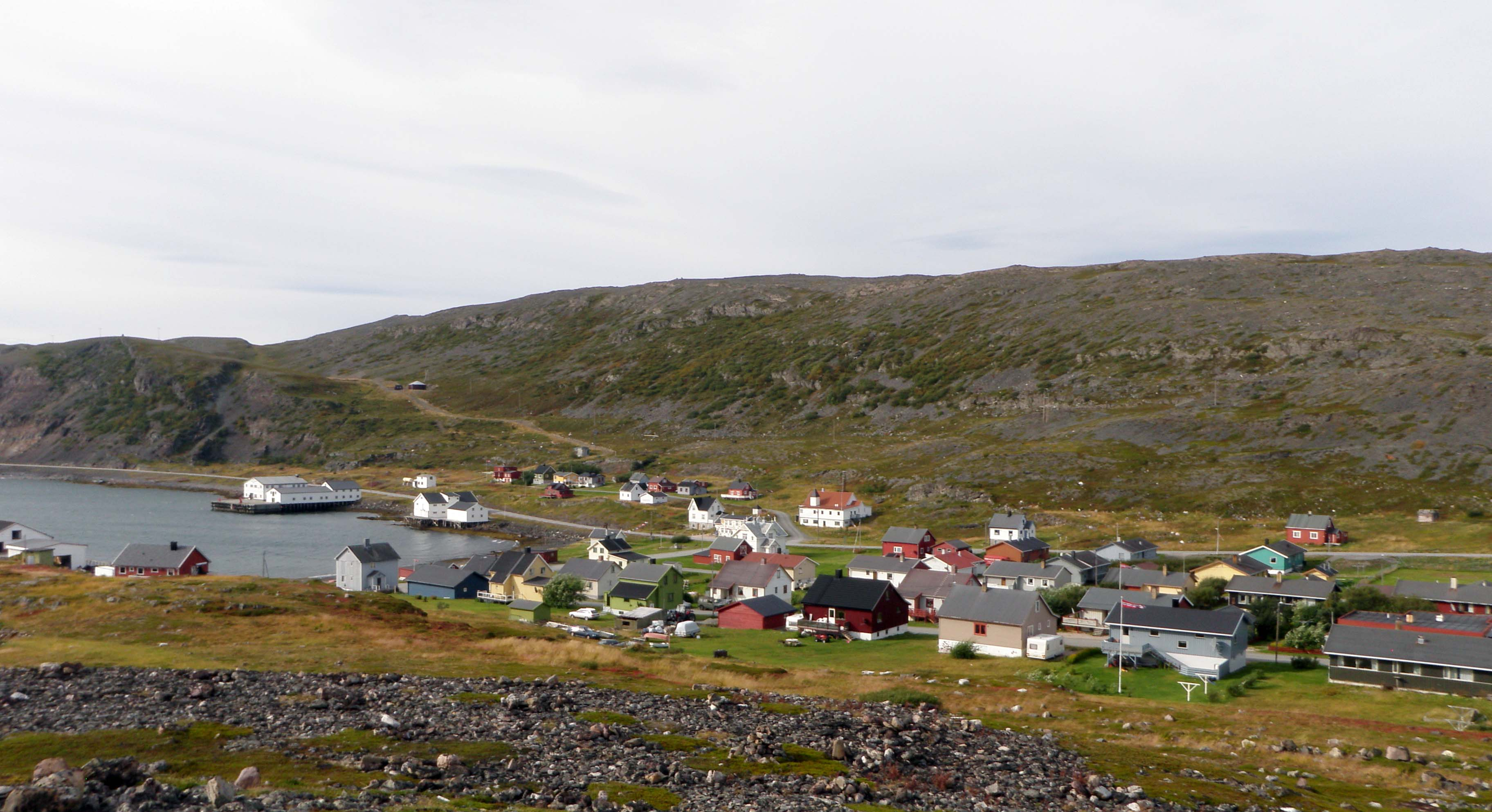
Centre of Kongsfjord, with Kongsfjord Chapel in the centre

Kongsfjord is a fishing village in Berlevåg Municipality in Finnmark county, Norway. It is one out of two preserved "væreier" localities in Finnmark. The fishing village is located along the Norwegian county road 890, about 30 kilometres (19 mi) to the southeast of the village of Berlevåg.
