= Kjølnes Lighthouse =

Coastal lighthouse in Berlevåg, Norway

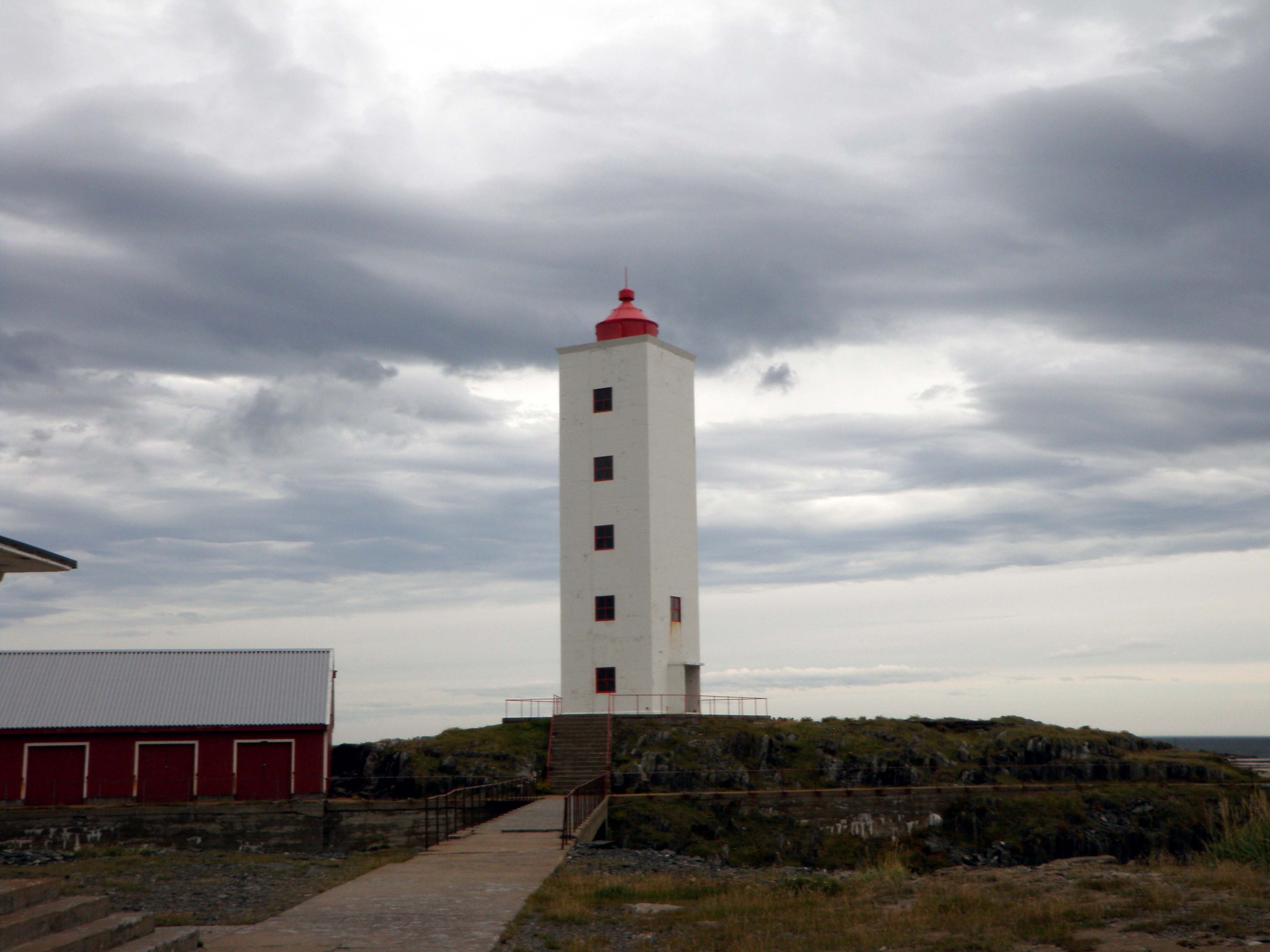
- Kjølnes Lighthouse in 2013
- Location of the lighthouse
- Location: Berlevåg Municipality; Finnmark, Norway
- Coordinates: 70°51′11.2″N 29°14′09.0″E

Tower
- Constructed: 1916 (first)
- Construction: concrete tower
- Automated: 1994
- Height: 22 metres (72 ft)
- Shape: square tower with balcony and lantern
- Markings: white tower, red lantern
- Heritage: cultural heritage preservation in Norway
- Racon: K

Light
- First lit: 1949 (current)
- Focal height: 25.7 metres (84 ft)
- Intensity: 290,000 candela
- Range: 15 nmi (28 km; 17 mi)
- Characteristic: Fl (3) W 40s.
- Norway no.: 963300

Kjølnes Lighthouse (Norwegian: Kjølnes fyr) is a coastal lighthouse located in Berlevåg Municipality in Finnmark county, Norway. It is located on the Varanger Peninsula along the Barents Sea, about 5 kilometres (3.1 mi) east of the village of Berlevåg.

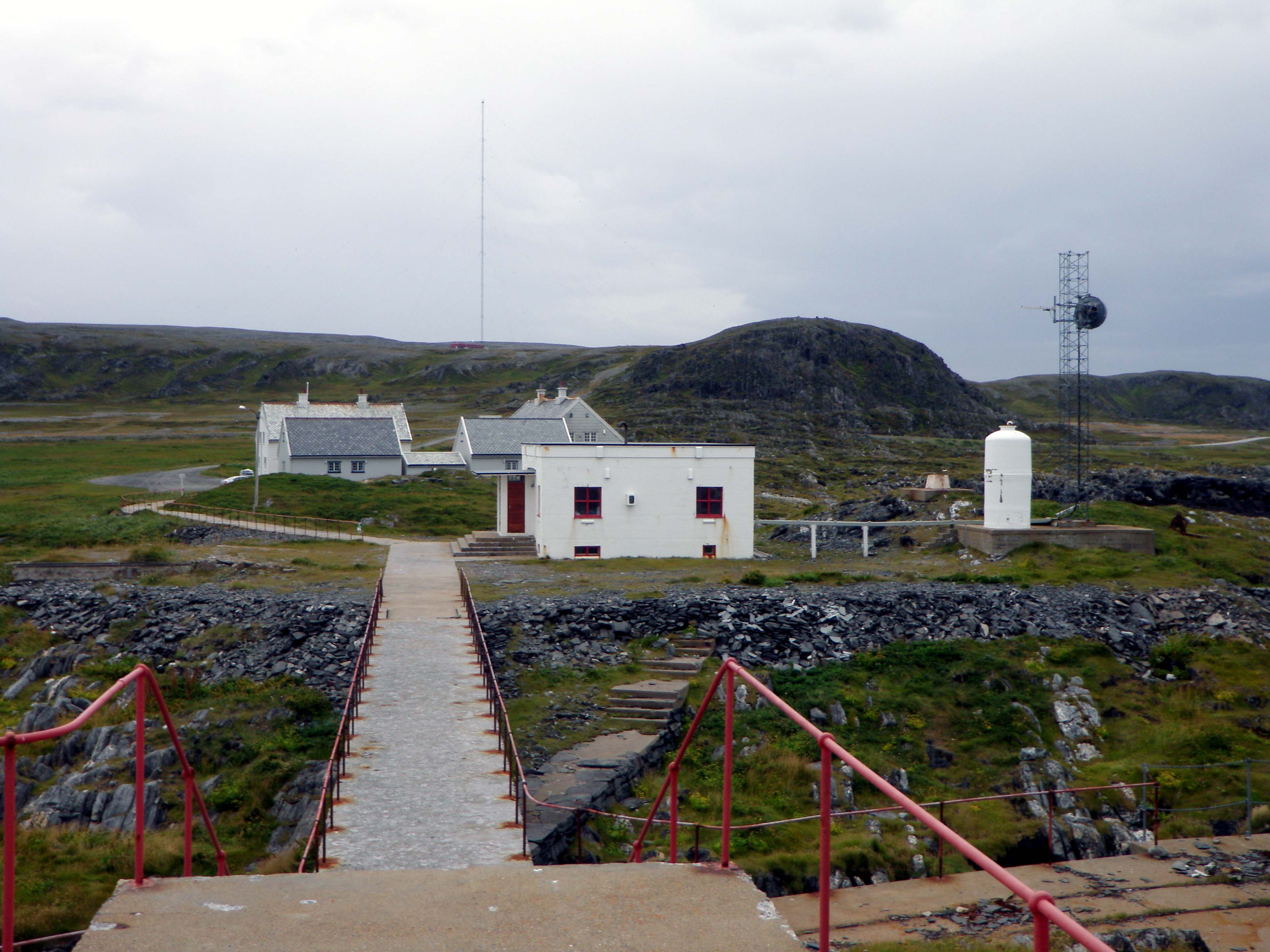
View of the machinery house and keeper's houses at Kjølnes Lighthouse

== History ==
The lighthouse was founded in 1916, but destroyed when the Germans withdrew from Finnmark in the autumn of 1944. It was rebuilt in 1949 based on designs made by the architects Gudolf Blakstad and Herman Munthe-Kaas.

In 1983, a small fishing vessel named Austhavet wrecked close to Kjølnes in a storm. 3 local fishermen deceased in the wrecking.

The lighthouse has been used as a guest house/rental cottage since 1994 when it was automated and the keeper's house was no longer occupied.

A number of different buildings make up the lighthouse station: lighthouse, machinery hall, boathouse, landings along with multiple residences with outhouses. The residentially functioning buildings are organised around a yard, while the other buildings are situated at a slight distance from this. The white, square, concrete tower is 22 metres (72 ft) tall and it has a cylindrical red lantern on top that emits three white flashes every 40 seconds. The light has an intensity of 290,000 candelas and it can be seen for up to 15 nautical miles (28 km; 17 mi). The light is on from 12 August until 24 April each year. The light is off during the summer due to the midnight sun.

== See also ==
- Lighthouses in Norway
- List of lighthouses in Norway
