= Berlevåg Municipality =

Municipality in Finnmark, Norway

Berlevåg Municipality Berlevåg kommune Bearalvági gielda (Northern Sami)
- Municipality
- Berlevaag herred (historic name)
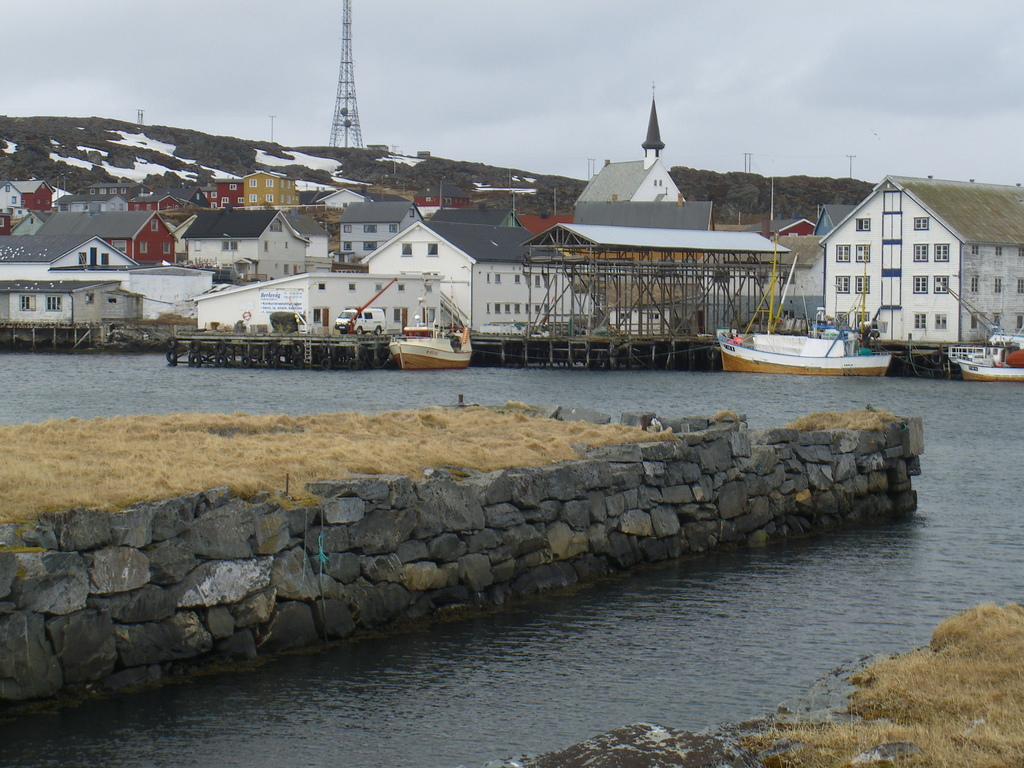
- View of the village of Berlevåg

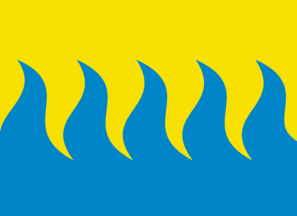
- Flag Coat of arms

- Finnmark within Norway

- Berlevåg within Finnmark
- Coordinates: 70°51′29″N 29°05′06″E
- Country: Norway
- County: Finnmark
- District: Øst-Finnmark
- Established: 1 Jan 1914
  - Preceded by: Tana Municipality
- Administrative centre: Berlevåg

Government
  - Mayor (2015): Rolf Laupstad (Ap)

Area
  - Total: 1,121.77 km^{2} (433.12 sq mi)
  - Land: 1,082.68 km^{2} (418.03 sq mi)
  - Water: 39.09 km^{2} (15.09 sq mi) 3.5%
  - Rank: #100 in Norway
- Highest elevation: 619 m (2,031 ft)

Population (2024)
  - Total: 892
  - Rank: #341 in Norway
  - Density: 0.8/km^{2} (2.1/sq mi)
  - Change (10 years): ▼ −15.6%
- Demonym: Berlevåging

Official language
  - Norwegian form: Bokmål
- Time zone: UTC+01:00 (CET)
  - Summer (DST): UTC+02:00 (CEST)
- ISO 3166 code: NO-5630
- Website: Official website

Berlevåg (Northern Sami: Bearalváhki) is a municipality in Finnmark county, Norway. It is located in the traditional district of Øst-Finnmark. The administrative centre of the municipality is the village of Berlevåg.

There are two settlements in the municipality of Berlevåg: the village of Berlevåg and the village of Kongsfjord. The village of Berlevåg is by far the biggest; Kongsfjord only has around 45 inhabitants. Kjølnes Lighthouse is located along the shore, east of the village of Berlevåg.

The 1,122-square-kilometre (433 sq mi) municipality is the 100th largest by area out of the 357 municipalities in Norway. Berlevåg is the 341st most populous municipality in Norway with a population of 892. The municipality's population density is 0.8 inhabitants per square kilometre (2.1/sq mi) and its population has decreased by 15.6% over the previous 10-year period.

== General information ==
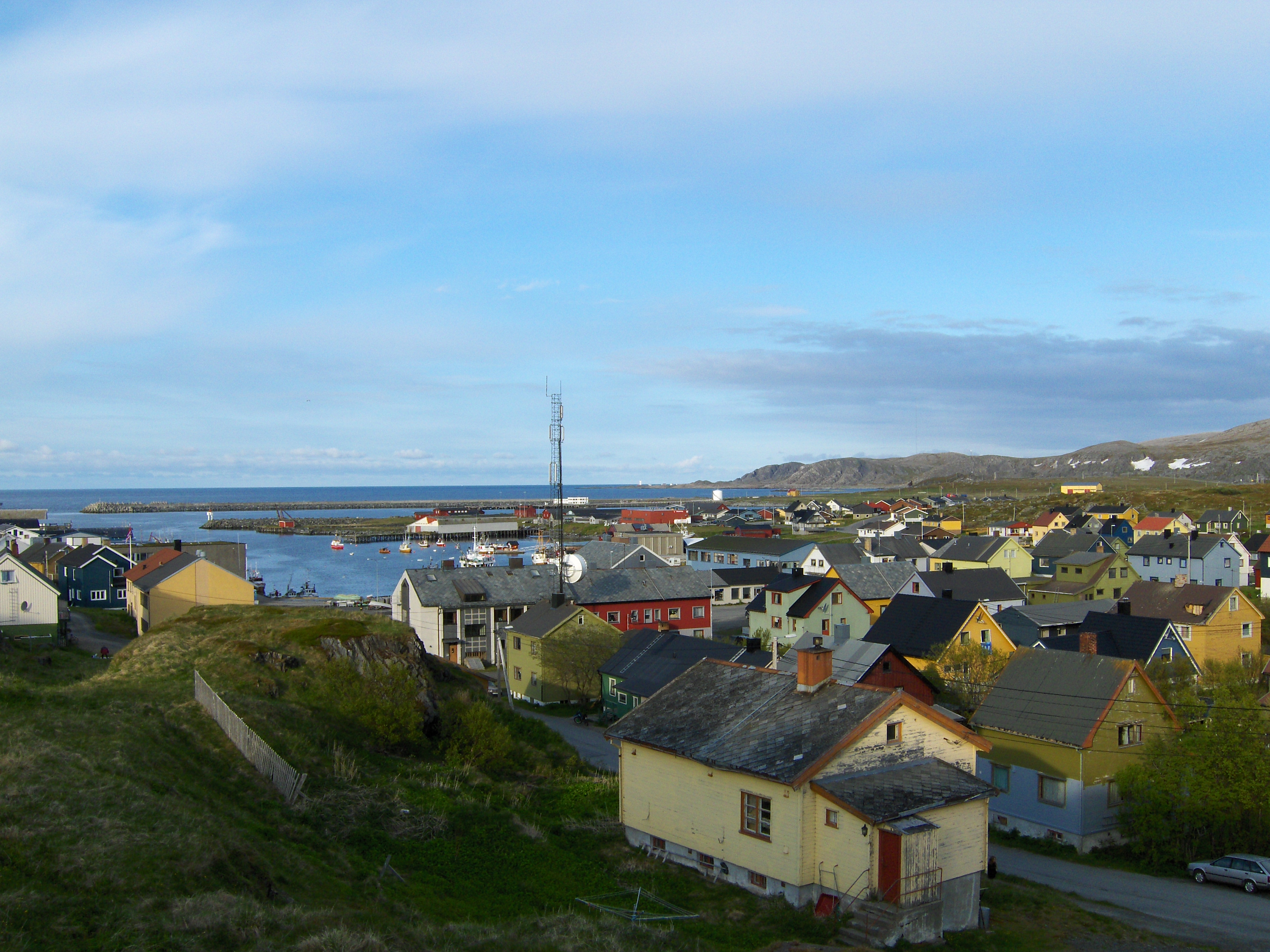
View of the village of Berlevåg

The municipality of Berlevåg was established on 1 January 1914 when it was separated from Tana Municipality. Initially, there were 784 residents. The borders have remained unchanged since that time.

On 1 January 2020, the municipality became part of the newly formed Troms og Finnmark county. Previously, it had been part of the old Finnmark county. On 1 January 2024, the Troms og Finnmark county was divided and the municipality once again became part of Finnmark county.

=== Name ===
There are different opinions of the origin of the name Berlevåg (or historically spelled Berlevaag). The first is that it relates to an old Northern Sami language name that sounded like Berlevaggi or Perlavaggi. The second is that it derives from the name of the first settler or explorer at the bay whose name was Berle or Perle. The last theory of the name Berlevåg (which is less likely) is that the first element derives from the Norwegian word perle which means "pearl" and the last element is våg which means "bay". On 21 December 1917, a royal resolution enacted the 1917 Norwegian language reforms. Prior to this change, the name was spelled Berlevaag with the digraph "aa", and after this reform, the name was spelled Berlevåg, using the letter å instead.

=== Coat of arms ===
The coat of arms was granted on 22 July 1988. The official blazon is "Per fess rayonny Or and azure" (Norwegian: Delt av gult og blått ved flammesnitt). This means the arms have a field (background) that is divided by a line with a rayonny design with five waves with yellow over blue. The field above the line has a tincture of Or which means it is commonly colored yellow, but if it is made out of metal, then gold is used. The color below the line has a tincture of azure (blue). The design is meant to symbolize the sun over the waves of the sea that break against the shore. This can represent both the struggle against the sea as well as the dependence on it. The arms were designed by Arvid Sveen.

=== Churches ===
The Church of Norway has one parish (sokn) within Berlevåg Municipality. It is part of the Varanger prosti (deanery) in the Diocese of Nord-Hålogaland.

Churches in Berlevåg Municipality
Parish (sokn)	Church name	Location of the church	Year built
Berlevåg	Berlevåg Church	Berlevåg	1960

== Transportation ==
Berlevåg Airport is located just outside the village of Berlevåg. Norwegian County Road 890 runs through Berlevåg, connecting it to the neighboring municipalities, and the rest of Norway.

Facing rough ocean conditions, the four man-made breakwaters that protect the harbor of Berlevåg have been destroyed several times due to bad weather. The current breakwaters include tetrapods that intertwine and have made for a flexible breakwater that can resist the Barents Sea. The port was completely secured with breakwaters in 1973. Since then, the Coastal Ferry has been able to dock in Berlevåg. Prior to that time, a smaller vessel had to unload cargo and passengers from it in the open sea and then ferry them in to the port.

== Government ==
Berlevåg Municipality is responsible for primary education (through 10th grade), outpatient health services, senior citizen services, welfare and other social services, zoning, economic development, and municipal roads and utilities. The municipality is governed by a municipal council of directly elected representatives. The mayor is indirectly elected by a vote of the municipal council. The municipality is under the jurisdiction of the Indre og Østre Finnmark District Court and the Hålogaland Court of Appeal.

=== Municipal council ===
The municipal council (Kommunestyre) of Berlevåg Municipality is made up of 13 representatives that are elected to four year terms. The tables below show the current and historical composition of the council by political party.

Berlevåg kommunestyre 2023–2027
Party name (in Norwegian)	Number of representatives
Labour Party (Arbeiderpartiet)	8
Socialist Left Party (Sosialistisk Venstreparti)	5
Total number of members:	13

Berlevåg kommunestyre 2019–2023
Party name (in Norwegian)	Number of representatives
Labour Party (Arbeiderpartiet)	6
Conservative Party (Høyre)	3
Centre Party (Senterpartiet)	1
Socialist Left Party (Sosialistisk Venstreparti)	3
Total number of members:	13

Berlevåg kommunestyre 2015–2019
Party name (in Norwegian)	Number of representatives
Labour Party (Arbeiderpartiet)	10
Conservative Party (Høyre)	3
Total number of members:	13

Berlevåg kommunestyre 2011–2015
Party name (in Norwegian)	Number of representatives
Labour Party (Arbeiderpartiet)	5
Progress Party (Fremskrittspartiet)	1
Conservative Party (Høyre)	7
Total number of members:	13

Berlevåg kommunestyre 2007–2011
Party name (in Norwegian)	Number of representatives
Labour Party (Arbeiderpartiet)	8
Progress Party (Fremskrittspartiet)	1
Conservative Party (Høyre)	4
Total number of members:	13

Berlevåg kommunestyre 2003–2007
Party name (in Norwegian)	Number of representatives
Labour Party (Arbeiderpartiet)	4
Progress Party (Fremskrittspartiet)	1
Conservative Party (Høyre)	2
Socialist Left Party (Sosialistisk Venstreparti)	4
Berlevåg Free Voters (Berlevåg frie velgere)	2
Total number of members:	13

Berlevåg kommunestyre 1999–2003
Party name (in Norwegian)	Number of representatives
Labour Party (Arbeiderpartiet)	5
Conservative Party (Høyre)	3
Socialist Left Party (Sosialistisk Venstreparti)	2
Berlevåg Free Voters (Berlevåg frie velgere)	3
Total number of members:	13

Berlevåg kommunestyre 1995–1999
Party name (in Norwegian)	Number of representatives
Labour Party (Arbeiderpartiet)	8
Conservative Party (Høyre)	3
Socialist Left Party (Sosialistisk Venstreparti)	2
Total number of members:	13

Berlevåg kommunestyre 1991–1995
Party name (in Norwegian)	Number of representatives
Labour Party (Arbeiderpartiet)	11
Conservative Party (Høyre)	4
Socialist Left Party (Sosialistisk Venstreparti)	2
Total number of members:	17

Berlevåg kommunestyre 1987–1991
Party name (in Norwegian)	Number of representatives
Labour Party (Arbeiderpartiet)	8
Communist Party (Kommunistiske Parti)	1
Socialist Left Party (Sosialistisk Venstreparti)	1
Cross-Party List (Tverrpolitisk folkeliste)	2
Berlevåg and Kongsfjord Free Voters' List (Berlevåg og Kongsfjord Frie Velgeres liste)	5
Total number of members:	17

Berlevåg kommunestyre 1983–1987
Party name (in Norwegian)	Number of representatives
Labour Party (Arbeiderpartiet)	9
Conservative Party (Høyre)	3
Communist Party (Kommunistiske Parti)	1
Socialist Left Party (Sosialistisk Venstreparti)	1
Youth List (Ungdomslista)	1
Berlevåg and Kongsfjord Free Voters' List (Berlevåg og Kongsfjord Frie Velgeres liste)	2
Total number of members:	17

Berlevåg kommunestyre 1979–1983
Party name (in Norwegian)	Number of representatives
Labour Party (Arbeiderpartiet)	6
Conservative Party (Høyre)	3
Communist Party (Kommunistiske Parti)	1
Socialist Left Party (Sosialistisk Venstreparti)	1
Berlevåg and Kongsfjord Free Voters (Berlevåg og Kongsfjord Frie Velger)	6
Total number of members:	17

Berlevåg kommunestyre 1975–1979
Party name (in Norwegian)	Number of representatives
Labour Party (Arbeiderpartiet)	10
Socialist Left Party (Sosialistisk Venstreparti)	2
Joint list of the Conservatives, Liberals, and Kongsfjord Free Voters (Høyre, Venstre og Kongsfjord Frie Velgeres Liste)	5
Total number of members:	17

Berlevåg kommunestyre 1971–1975
Party name (in Norwegian)	Number of representatives
Labour Party (Arbeiderpartiet)	10
Conservative Party (Høyre)	3
Communist Party (Kommunistiske Parti)	1
Socialist People's Party (Sosialistisk Folkeparti)	2
Liberal Party (Venstre)	1
Total number of members:	17

Berlevåg kommunestyre 1967–1971
Party name (in Norwegian)	Number of representatives
Labour Party (Arbeiderpartiet)	11
Conservative Party (Høyre)	2
Communist Party (Kommunistiske Parti)	1
Socialist People's Party (Sosialistisk Folkeparti)	2
Liberal Party (Venstre)	1
Total number of members:	17

Berlevåg kommunestyre 1963–1967
Party name (in Norwegian)	Number of representatives
Labour Party (Arbeiderpartiet)	11
Conservative Party (Høyre)	3
Communist Party (Kommunistiske Parti)	2
Socialist People's Party (Sosialistisk Folkeparti)	1
Total number of members:	17

Berlevåg herredsstyre 1959–1963
Party name (in Norwegian)	Number of representatives
Labour Party (Arbeiderpartiet)	10
Conservative Party (Høyre)	2
Communist Party (Kommunistiske Parti)	3
Liberal Party (Venstre)	1
Local List(s) (Lokale lister)	1
Total number of members:	17

Berlevåg herredsstyre 1955–1959
Party name (in Norwegian)	Number of representatives
Labour Party (Arbeiderpartiet)	8
Conservative Party (Høyre)	1
Communist Party (Kommunistiske Parti)	2
Christian Democratic Party (Kristelig Folkeparti)	1
Local List(s) (Lokale lister)	1
Total number of members:	13

Berlevåg herredsstyre 1951–1955
Party name (in Norwegian)	Number of representatives
Labour Party (Arbeiderpartiet)	6
Communist Party (Kommunistiske Parti)	2
Joint List(s) of Non-Socialist Parties (Borgerlige Felleslister)	2
Local List(s) (Lokale lister)	2
Total number of members:	12

Berlevåg herredsstyre 1947–1951
Party name (in Norwegian)	Number of representatives
Labour Party (Arbeiderpartiet)	5
Communist Party (Kommunistiske Parti)	4
Local List(s) (Lokale lister)	3
Total number of members:	12

Berlevåg herredsstyre 1945–1947
Party name (in Norwegian)	Number of representatives
Labour Party (Arbeiderpartiet)	6
Communist Party (Kommunistiske Parti)	3
Joint List(s) of Non-Socialist Parties (Borgerlige Felleslister)	1
Local List(s) (Lokale lister)	2
Total number of members:	12

Berlevåg herredsstyre 1937–1941*
Party name (in Norwegian)	Number of representatives
Labour Party (Arbeiderpartiet)	5
List of workers, fishermen, and small farmholders (Arbeidere, fiskere, småbrukere liste)	3
Joint List(s) of Non-Socialist Parties (Borgerlige Felleslister)	3
Local List(s) (Lokale lister)	1
Total number of members:	12
Note: Due to the German occupation of Norway during World War II, no elections were held for new municipal councils until after the war ended in 1945.

=== Mayors ===
The mayor (Norwegian: ordfører) of Berlevåg Municipality is the political leader of the municipality and the chairperson of the municipal council. Here is a list of people who have held this position:

- 1914–1919: Alf Brodtkorb (LL)
- 1920–1925: Christian Olsen Gaare (LL)
- 1926–1931: Anton Grebstad (V)
- 1932–1934: Jørgen Lund (Ap)
- 1934–1953: Jentoft Jensen (Ap)
- 1953–1969: Agaton Larsen (Ap)
- 1970–1975: Finn Jørstad (Ap)
- 1976–1977: Oddrunn Pettersen (Ap)
- 1978–1979: Gullik Bugge Nicolaysen (Ap)
- 1980–1983: Tora Høgestøl (LL)
- 1984–1991: Bjarne Johnsen (Ap)
- 1992–1995: Erik Brøske (Ap)
- 1995–1999: Arne Kristian Arntzen (Ap)
- 1999–2003: Steinar Hansen (Ap)
- 2003–2007: Erik Brøske (SV)
- 2007–2011: Janne Andreassen (Ap)
- 2011–2015: Karsten G. Schanche (H)
- 2015–present: Rolf Laupstad (Ap)

== Geography ==
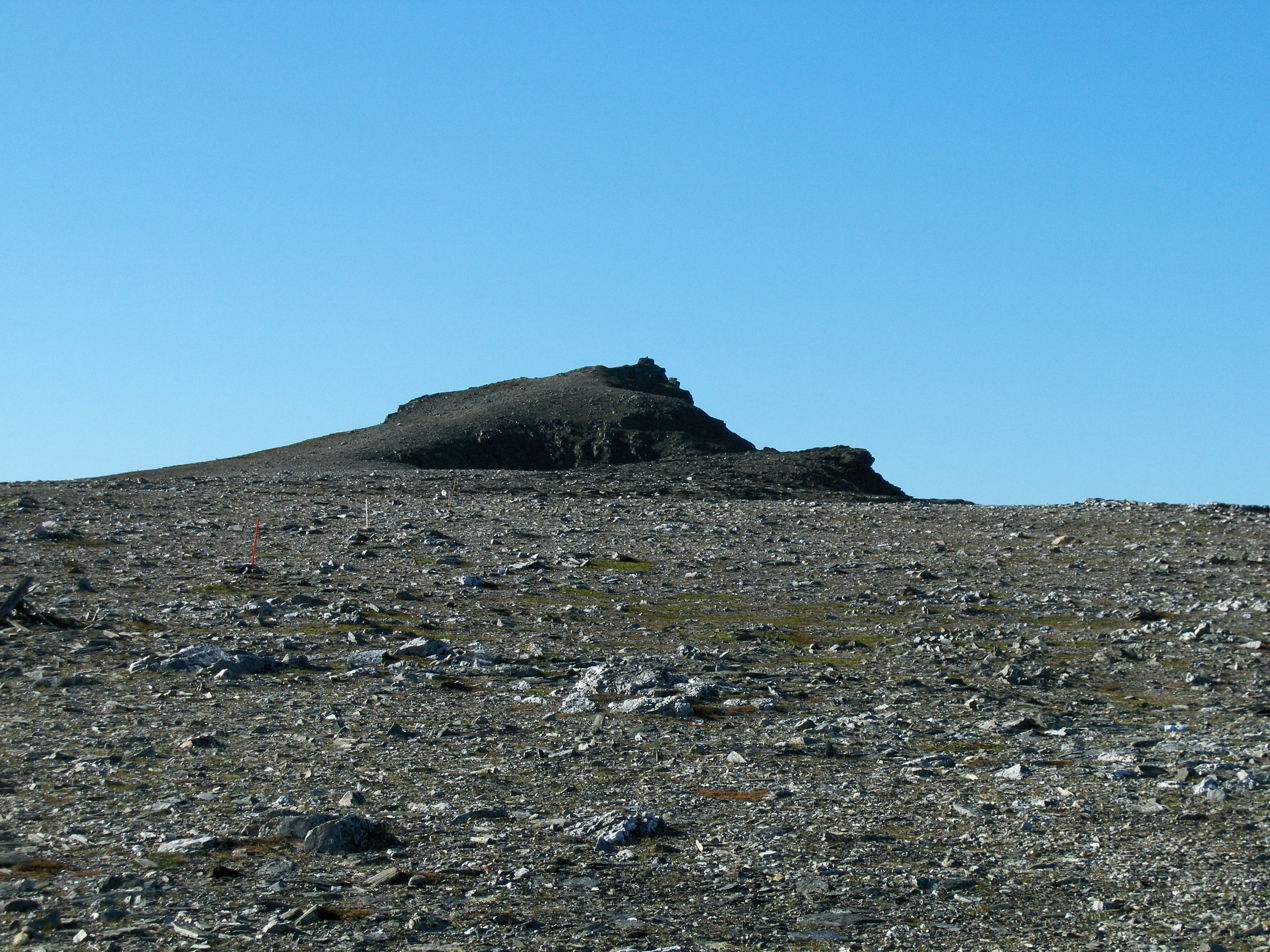
View of the Tanahorn mountain

The municipality is situated in the northwestern part of the Varanger Peninsula, facing the open Barents Sea to the north and the Tanafjorden to the west. It is an isolated and barren region with mostly rocks and tundra. There are no native trees in Berlevåg because of the cold and windy summers. The municipality also contains the lakes Geatnjajávri and Skonsvikvatnan. The highest point in the municipality is the 619-metre (2,031 ft) tall mountain Hanglefjellet.

=== Climate ===
Berlevåg's coastal location serves to moderate temperatures during winter, giving it a marine subarctic climate. Coldest month is February with mean −4.6 °C (24 °F), while warmest month is July and August, both with mean 10.4 °C (51 °F).

=== Birdlife ===
The sea and the islands along this part of Finnmark's coastline are home for thousands of seabirds. As well as the large seabird colonies with thousands of nesting birds, there are also areas of unspoiled nature consisting of mountains, moorlands, and marshes. This enables birdwatching in a natural environment. A 17,855 ha area of marine waters along the coast, including supralittoral and neritic habitats, has been designated an Important Bird Area (IBA) by BirdLife International because it supports a population of Steller's eiders.

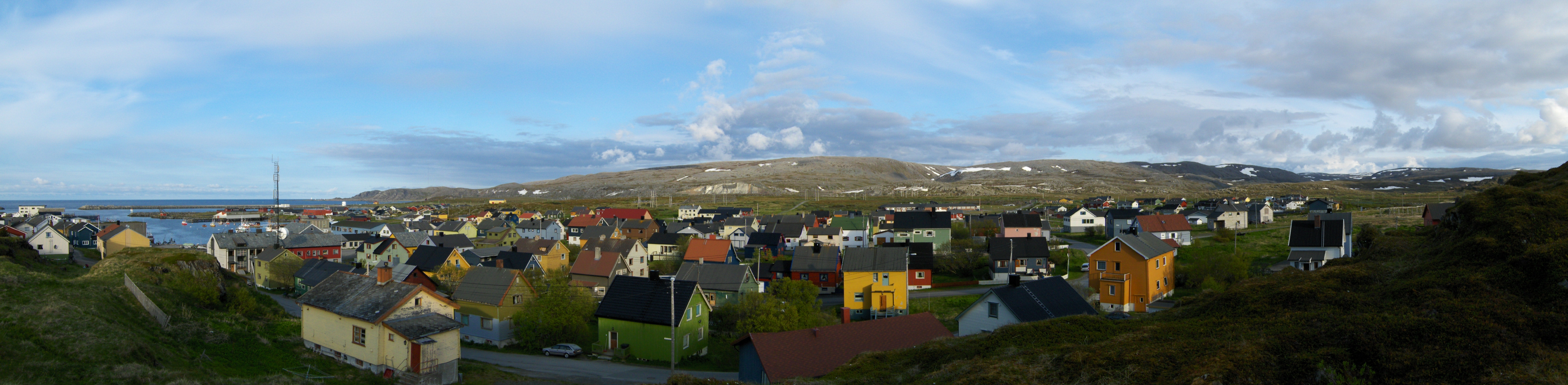
Panorama of Berlevåg

== History ==
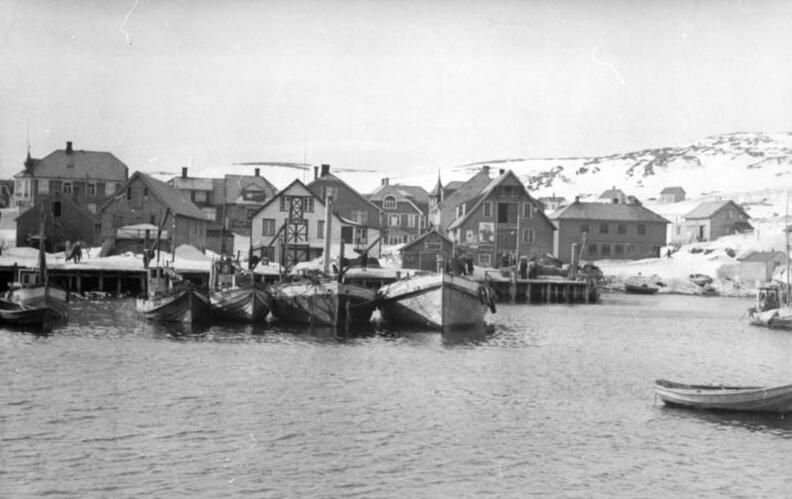
View of the village of Berlevåg in 1942, before the village was burned

=== World War II ===
Berlevåg, along with the rest of Finnmark, was occupied during World War II. Berlevåg Airport was originally put into use at this time, when German occupying forces constructed it with the help of hundreds of Russian prisoners of war. From 1943 to 1944, there were nearly daily bombing raids from Russia on Berlevåg and the German airfield.

In November 1944, the village was completely burned down and the inhabitants evacuated by force as part of the scorched earth strategy of the Germans. In the aftermath, the Norwegian government wanted to relocate the inhabitants to nearby Kongsfjord because of a better harbour, but they refused, and the village was rebuilt. As there are absolutely no trees in Berlevåg, many of the houses in Berlevåg were built by the help of the wooden planks in the "tarmac" and runway of the previous German airfield.

== Popular culture ==
Berlevåg was brought some fame in Norway when the Norwegian film director Knut Erik Jensen made a documentary film about Berlevåg Mannsangsforening, Berlevåg's men's choir. The movie Heftig og begeistret (English: "Cool and Crazy") was a big hit 2001 in Norway, first shown at Tromsø International Film Festival. The choir later went on a tour of the United States and were featured at Ground zero in New York City. The choir's oldest and most famous member, Einar Strand, died at the age of 98 in 2004.

Berlevåg is also the place for the fictional story "Babette's Feast" by the Danish author Karen Blixen / Isak Dinesen published in the anthology Anecdotes of Destiny (1958). (See also the homonym film Babette's Feast.)

== Notable Person ==
- Stig Henrik Hoff (born 1965), a Norwegian actor was born in Vadsø, but grew up in Berlevåg and Fiskum

== Sister City ==
The following are twin towns of Berlevåg:

- Belomorsk, Russia
