= Berlevåg Airport =

Airport in Berlevåg, Finnmark, Norway

Berlevåg Airport Berlevåg lufthavn

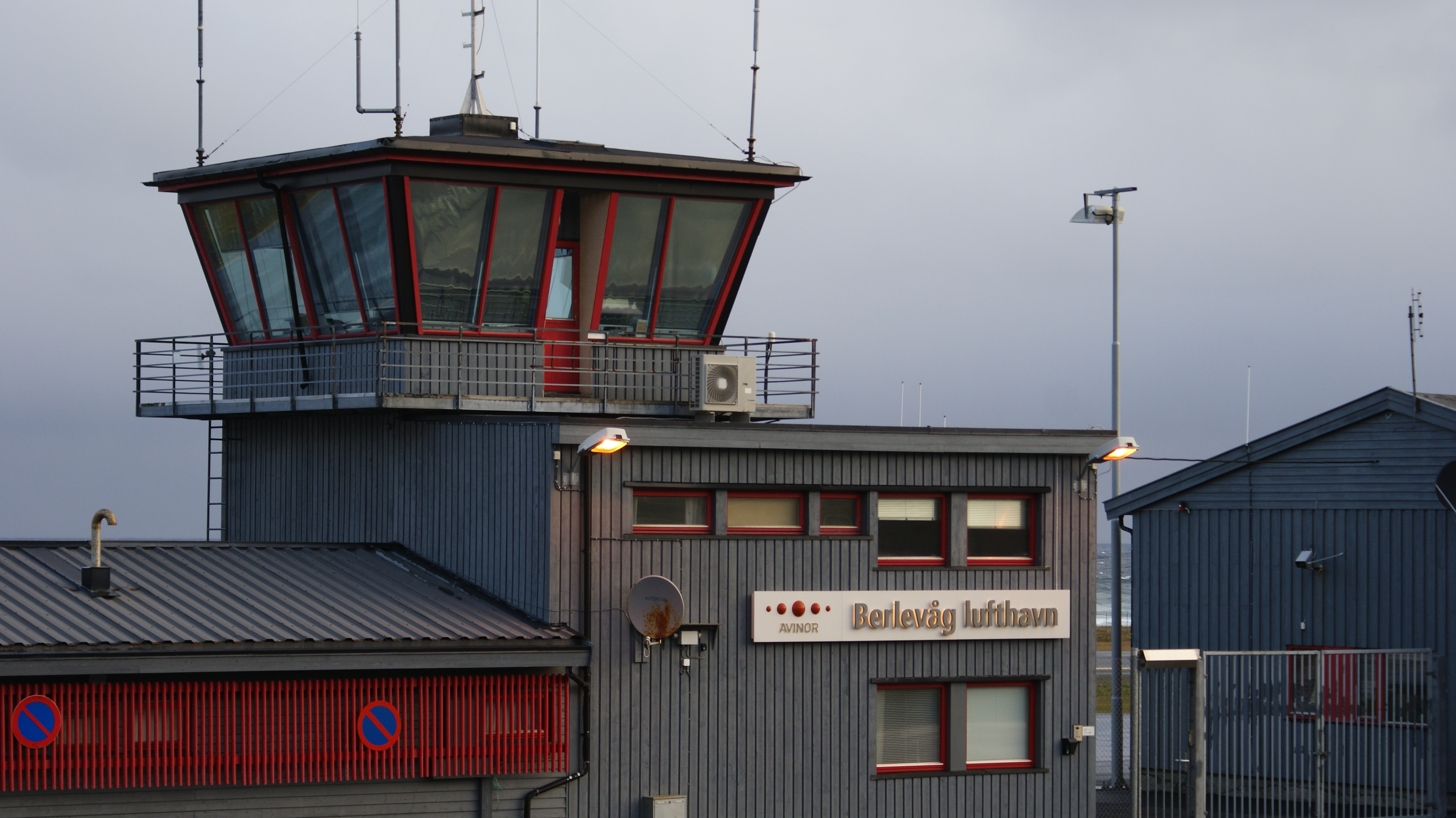
- IATA: BVG; ICAO: ENBV

Summary
- Airport type: Public
- Operator: Avinor
- Location: Berlevåg, Finnmark, Norway
- Elevation AMSL: 13 m / 43 ft
- Coordinates: 70°52′17″N 29°02′03″E
- Website: avinor.no

Map
- Location in Norway

Runways
| Direction | Length | | Surface |
| Direction | m | ft | Surface |
|---|---|---|---|
| 06/24 | 880 | 2,890 | Asphalt |

Statistics (2014)
- Passengers: 5,921
- Aircraft movements: 1,804
- Cargo (tonnes): 2

Berlevåg Airport (Norwegian: Berlevåg lufthavn; IATA: BVG, ICAO: ENBV) is a regional airport serving Berlevåg Municipality in Finnmark county, Norway. The airport is situated 2 kilometers (1.2 mi) northwest of the village of Berlevåg and is owned and operated by Avinor. The airport tower is operated remotely from Bodø.

The airport has a 880-meter (2,890 ft) runway aligned 06/24. Services are provided by Widerøe using Dash 8-100 aircraft to other communities in Finnmark. The airport served 5,921 passengers in the terminal (in 2016) and received the most subsidies per passenger of any Avinor airport. A further 8,948 landed and started at the airport without leaving the aircraft.

Construction of the airport started in 1943 by the Luftwaffe who stationed a detachment of Jagdgeschwader 5 (JG 5) there. Civilian operations started 1970 and were first provided by Norving. The airport was upgraded as part of a national program to establish regional airports and from 1974 services were taken over by Widerøe using de Havilland Canada Twin Otter aircraft. Dash 8 aircraft were introduced in 1994. The current terminal building dates from 1988. There have been local proposals to expand the airport, but Avinor does not wish to pursue these.

== History ==
During the German occupation of Norway during World War II, the German Wehrmacht was dependent on supplies to the town of Kirkenes which had to be shipped past Varanger Peninsula. The convoys were the target of bombardments from the Soviet Air Force, stationed close by on the Kola Peninsula. Originally the convoys were protected by the German Jagdgeschwader 5 based at Alta Airport. With an increasing number of raids, the Luftwaffe decided to build two airfields on Varangerhalvøya, Berlevåg and Vardø Airport, Svartnes

The Wehrmacht had become aware of the favorable location when two aircraft had performed an emergency landing at Storsletta in 1941. Construction at Berlevåg started in August 1943 and the airport received a 950-meter (3,120 ft) mixed concrete and wooden runway. The airfield received a detachment of fighter aircraft from JS5, including the Focke-Wulf Fw 190. A radar was installed on a hilltop close to the airport in 1944. The airport was demolished with the German retreat from Finnmark in 1944. The wooden runway was subsequently pillaged by locals to accumulate building materials for reconstruction.

Use of the airport area as a civilian airport was launched by Varangfly director Odd Bentzen in 1964. After visiting Iceland he proposed a series of short and simple airports in Finnmark which could serve the airline's air ambulance service. A different proposal was launched in 1966 by several of the larger airlines, including Scandinavian Airlines System, Braathens SAFE and Widerøe, to establish a network of short take-off and landing airports in rural areas; Berlevåg was one of six original proposals for Finnmark. A county committee was established in 1966 to look into building small airfields in Finnmark, including Berlevåg. In the following years the municipality made investments to allow the airfield to be used for air ambulance services. Part of the motivation was Berlevåg's poor port conditions, which often forced seaplanes to land at Kongsfjord.

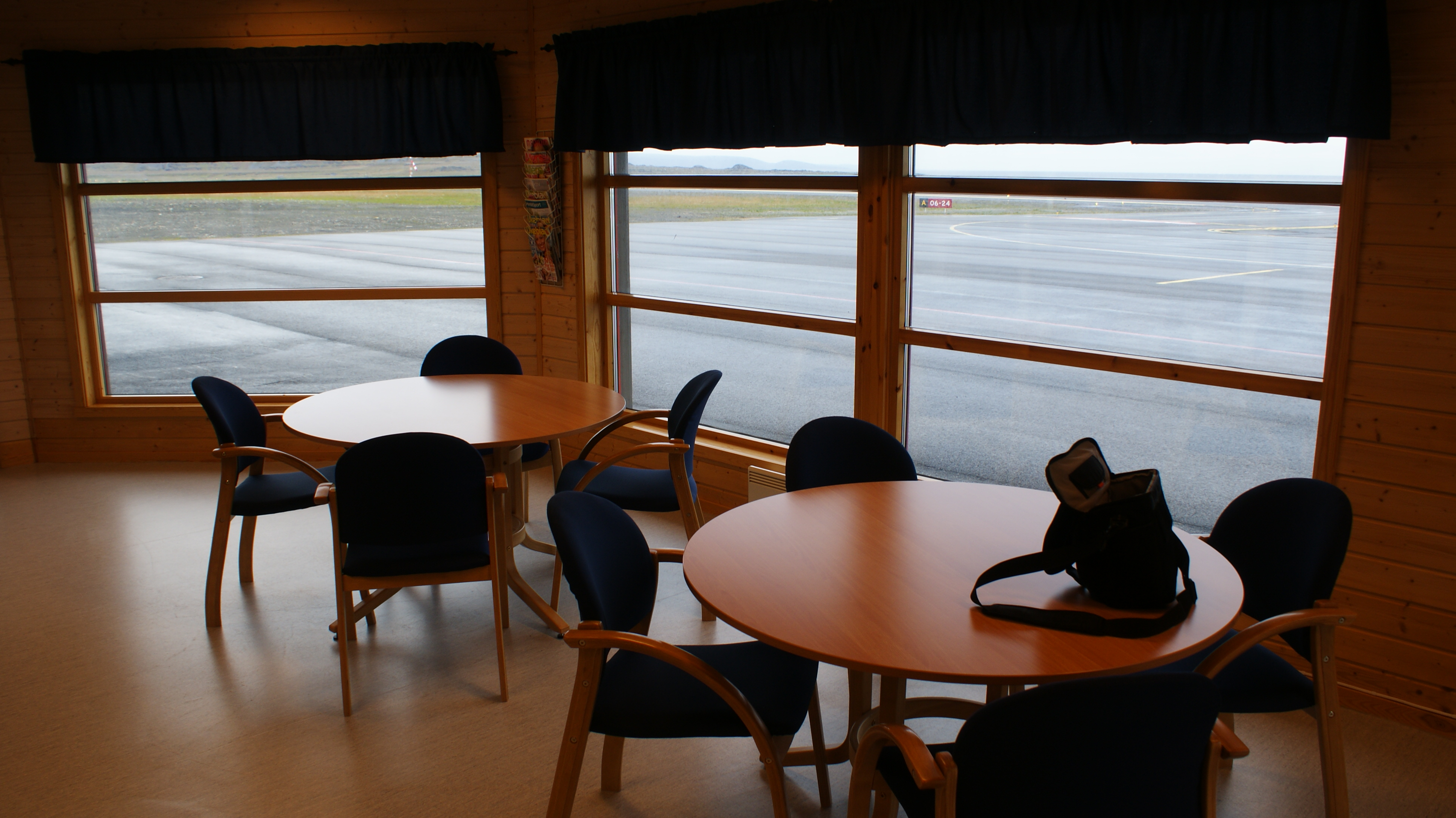
Airside waiting area in the terminal

Norving (previously Varangfly) started offering flights to the closed-down military airport in 1970 using their newly delivered Britten-Norman Islander. The background was a landing at the airfield to transport a baby to Kirkenes Hospital. The Civil Aviation Administration stated that they were not opposed to building smaller ambulance airports, but that the state's priority was constructing a network of regional airports. The service started off with a daily round trip ordered by the district physician; patients had priority, but the airline would transport other passengers as well. After a month a second daily round trip was introduced.

State funding was allocated, allowing the airport to be upgraded. The regional airport opened on 1 August 1974, the same day as four other airports in Finnmark. Both Widerøe and Norving applied to operate the subsidized regional routes in Finnmark, which included the route to Berlevåg. Widerøe was awarded the contract in 1973. Because of the steadily more regular flights to Berlevåg, Norving applied to the government for permission to operate these as taxi routes. While the airline had been forced to operate its taxi service on the time specifications of the customer, taxi routes would allow the airline to operate feeder services with timetables. No such permission was granted. Widerøe took over operations from 1 August 1974 using the de Havilland Canada Twin Otter. On 14 November 1980 the garage and workshop burned down; a new building was built and opened in 1982. The passenger terminal was expanded in 1988 with a new arrivals and departure hall. Widerøe introduced the Dash 8 in 1994. The state and the Civil Aviation Administration took over ownership and operations of the airport from 1 January 1997, in exchange for 2.2 million Norwegian krone (NOK) being paid to Berlevåg Municipality. Airport security was introduced on 1 January 2005.

== Plans ==
In the mid-2000s, Berlevåg Mayor Erik Brøske launched plans for an expansion of the airport, including both an expansion of the runway to at least 3,000 meters (9,800 ft) and the establishment of a helicopter base. The former was aimed at fish export to Asia while the latter was aimed at shuttle traffic to future oil fields in the Barents Sea. Avinor stated in 2012 that they saw no reason to look further into these plans.

Berlevåg Airport is located in an open flat area near the Barents Sea. Area somewhat prone to sea fog in the summer, but also a well-suited site for construction of a new primary airport in Finnmark. However, an expansion to 2,000 meters (6,600 ft) or longer will result in an all-new runway having to be built. The air distance to Båtsfjord Airport is only 39 km, so some suggested a combined airport, but the road distance is 91 km, needing 1½ hour, and road is prone to snow storms in winter. A 12 km tunnel would cut the distance to Båtsfjord by 30 km and make the road much more winter reliable, but that has been seen as too expensive. It could cost 1 billion NOK or more, compared with the 21 million (2013) annual subsidy of the airport.

In 2016, a new airport was opened in Båtsfjord, abandoning the idea of a shared airport for the two towns Båtsfjord and Berlevåg.

Avinor sees a problem in getting new aircraft of the size of the Dash 8-100 (39 seats) which can use the 800 meter runways, so they plan to use smaller planes with 19 seats when the Dash 8-100 retire.

== Facilities ==
The terminal building is 360 square meters (3,900 sq ft), of which 110 square meters (1,200 sq ft) is for the public, and has a capacity for 70 passengers per hour. The control tower is integrated into the terminal building. In addition there is a separate technical building with a garage. The airport lot covers an area of 44 hectares (110 acres).

Berlevåg Airport is located 2 kilometers (1.2 mi) from the village center, which is connected via County Road 271. There is parking for ten cars at the airport. Taxis are available at the airport, but there is no bus service.

The runway has an asphalted area of 880 by 30 meters (2,887 by 98 ft) aligned 06–24. The tarmac has parking to two Dash 8-sized aircraft. SCAT-I, a Global Positioning System-based landing system is installed.

== Airlines and destinations ==
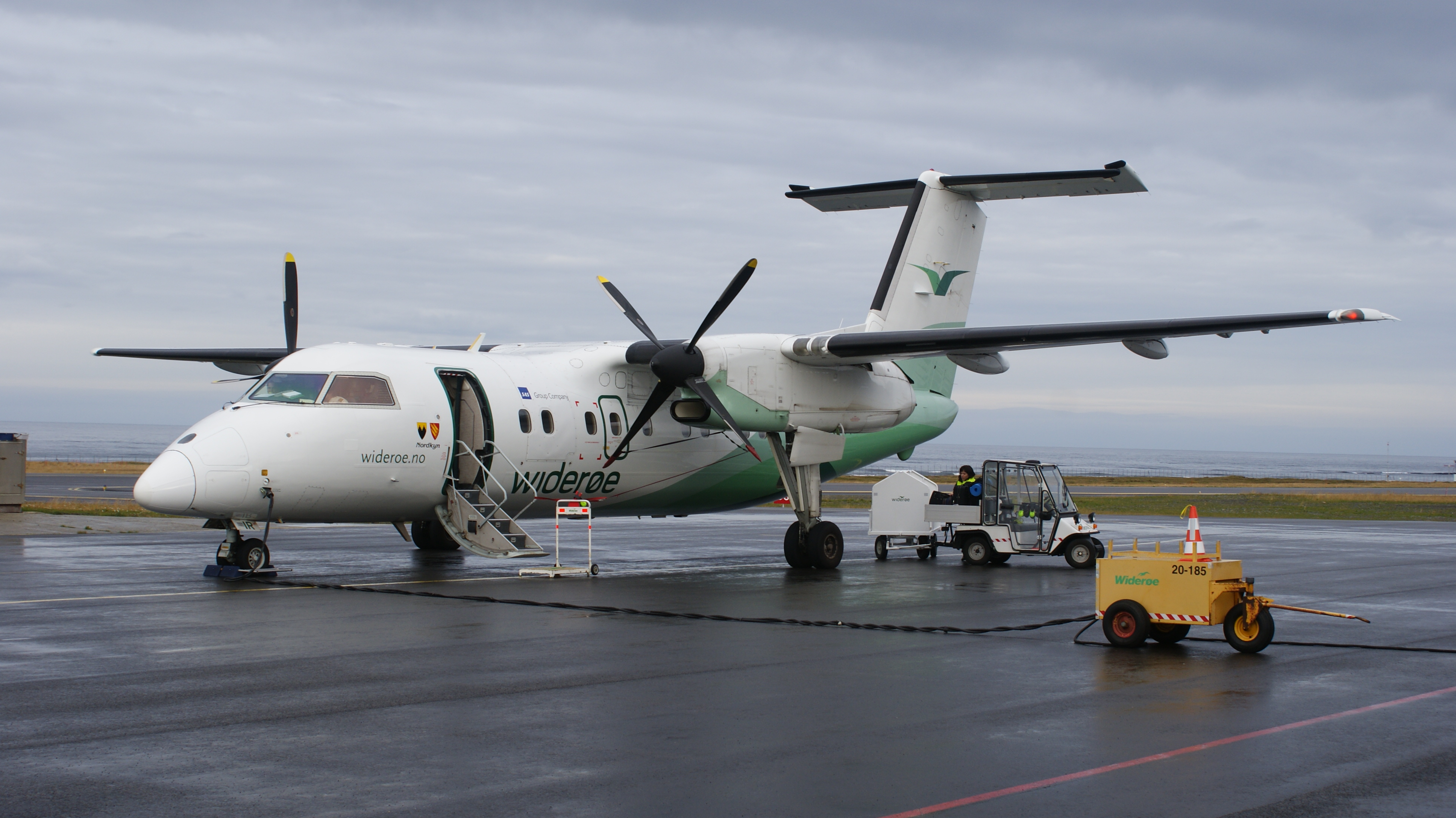
Widerøe Bombardier Dash-8 100 at Berlevåg Airport

Berlevåg Airport is served by Widerøe with Dash 8-100 aircraft connecting the community with Tromsø, Kirkenes and other airports in Finnmark. The routes are operated on public service obligation with the Ministry of Transport and Communications. In 2016 the airport had 5,921 passengers, 1,865 aircraft movements and handled 3 tonnes of cargo, making it the second-least Avinor-operated airport. In 2007 there were 1,878 aircraft movements, consisting of 1,725 scheduled flights, 106 ambulance flights and 47 other flights. Of Avinor's 45 airports, Berlevåg has the largest per-passenger deficit, of NOK 3,216.

| Airlines | Destinations |
|---|---|
| Widerøe | Alta, Båtsfjord, Hammerfest, Mehamn, Tromsø, Vadso |

== Statistics ==
Annual passenger traffic
| Year | Passengers | % Change |
|---|---|---|
| 2025 | 14,489 | ▼ -1.7% |
| 2024 | 14,744 | ▲7.4% |
| 2023 | 13,723 | ▼ -0.9% |
| 2022 | 13,843 | ▲12.2% |
| 2021 | 12,336 | ▲31.4% |
| 2020 | 9,389 | ▼ -33.2% |
| 2019 | 14,045 | ▲5.6% |
| 2018 | 13,301 | ▼ -5.3% |
| 2017 | 14,043 | ▼ -5.6% |
| 2016 | 14,869 | ▲3.9% |
| 2015 | 14,310 | |

== Accidents and incidents ==
On 11 March 1982 Widerøe Flight 933 crashed into the Barents Sea between Berlevåg and Mehamn Airport, after having made two intermediate stops since leaving Kirkenes Airport, Høybuktmoen. All fifteen people on board the Twin Otter were killed. The accident was caused by structural failure in the rudder and vertical stabilizer following severe clear-air turbulence. A conspiracy theory arose concerning a collision with a British Harrier fighter, which resulted in four investigations—none which found any evidence of a collision.
