= Berlevåg Church =

Church in Finnmark, Norway

- Berlevåg kirke
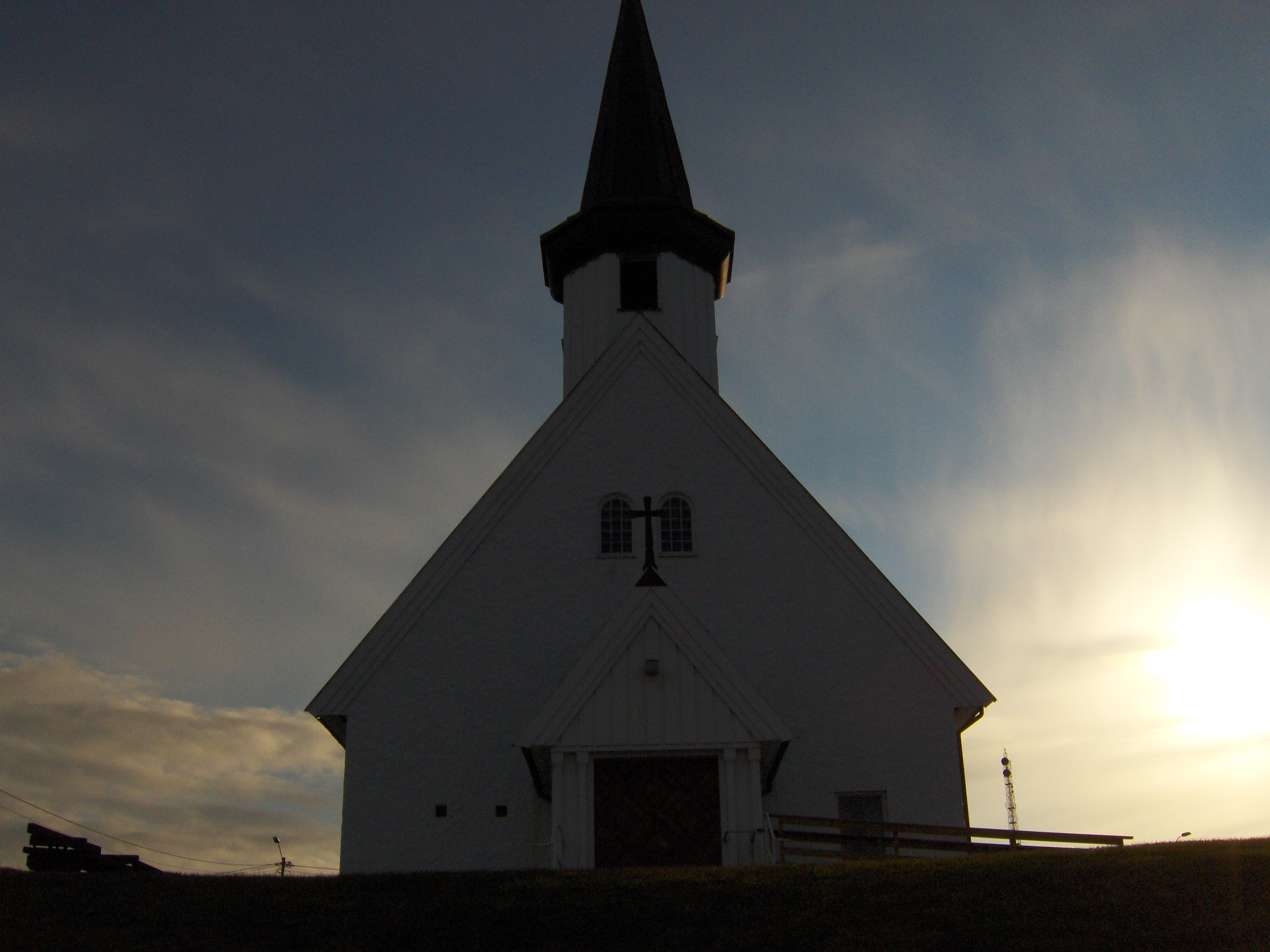
- View of the church
- Berlevåg Church
- 70.860867°N 29.089115°E
- Location: Berlevåg, Finnmark
- Country: Norway
- Denomination: Church of Norway
- Churchmanship: Evangelical Lutheran

History
- Status: Parish church
- Founded: 1869
- Consecrated: 11 Dec 1960

Architecture
- Functional status: Active
- Architect: Hans Magnus
- Architectural type: Long church
- Completed: 1960 (66 years ago)

Specifications
- Capacity: 300
- Materials: Concrete

Administration
- Diocese: Nord-Hålogaland
- Deanery: Varanger prosti
- Parish: Berlevåg
- Norwegian Cultural Heritage Site
- Type: Church
- Status: Not protected
- ID: 83882

Berlevåg Church (Norwegian: Berlevåg kirke) is a parish church of the Church of Norway in Berlevåg Municipality in Finnmark county, Norway. It is located in the village of Berlevåg. It is the church for the Berlevåg parish which is part of the Varanger prosti (deanery) in the Diocese of Nord-Hålogaland. The white, concrete church was built in a long church style in 1960 by the architect Hans Magnus. The church seats about 300 people.

== History ==
Historically, the Berlevåg area was part of the Tana Church parish, meaning that residents had to travel to Rustefjelbma which was a long, arduous journey. In 1869, a small annex chapel was built in Berlevåg that was used by the local residents. In 1885-1886, the old chapel was torn down and a new church was built on the same site. The new church was consecrated on 9 September 1886. By the 1930s, the church was in need of repair and upgrades, so an extensive renovation was begun in July 1939. After 15,000 kr in work was completed, the church was re-consecrated on 7 April 1940 by the Bishop Wollert Krohn-Hansen.

Towards the end of World War II, the retreating German army burned down the newly refurbished church in 1944. After the end of the war, it took a long time to rebuild all that had been destroyed in Finnmark during the war. Work on the new Berlevåg Church was completed in 1960. The footprint of the church covers about 275 square metres (2,960 sq ft) which included a nave, sacristy, and entrance porch. On 11 December 1960, Bishop Alf Wiig consecrated the new church building. The new church cost about 500,000 kr.

Berlevåg Church was part of the Tana prestegjeld until 1982, when the municipality became a separate prestegjeld.

== Media gallery ==
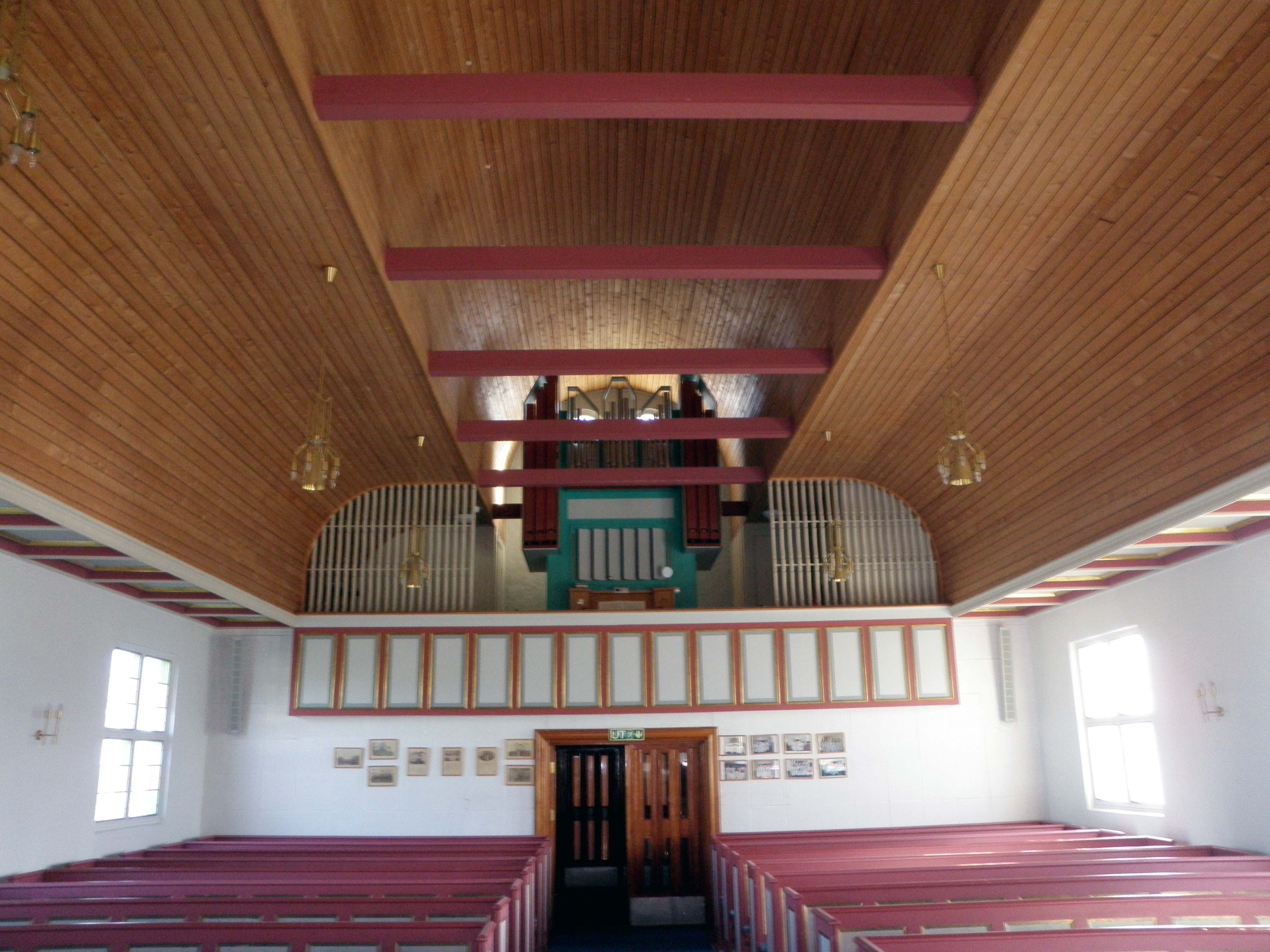
Interior view of the church

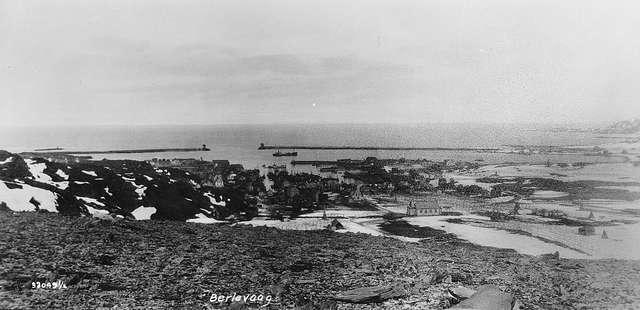
View of the old church from 1928

== See also ==
- List of churches in Nord-Hålogaland
