= Berlevåg (village) =

Village in Northern Norway

Berlevåg: Berlevåg (Norwegian); Bearalváhki (Northern Sami); Päärlyvooki (Kven)
- Village
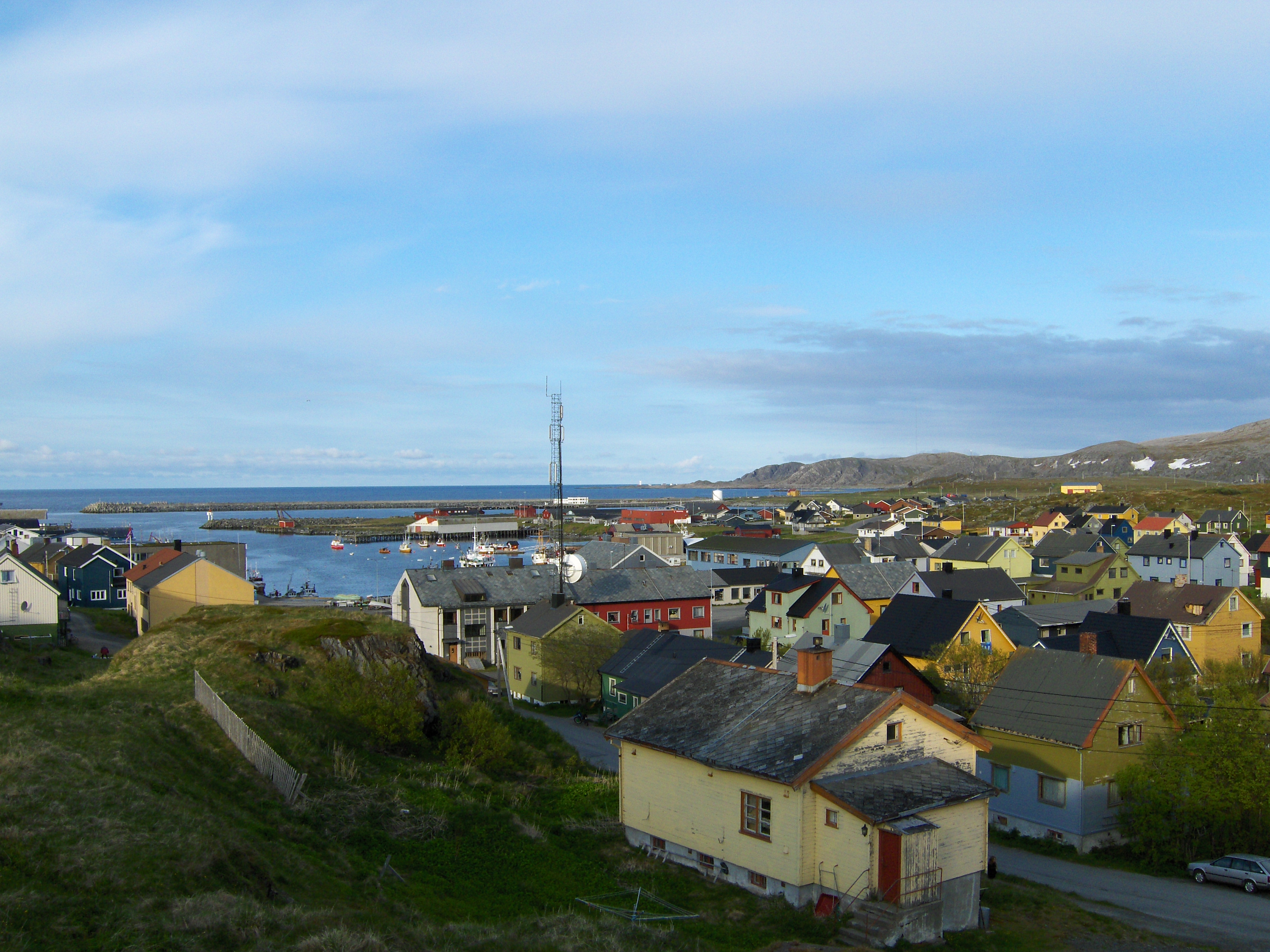
- View of the village
- Interactive map of Berlevåg
- Location within Finnmark Location within Norway
- Coordinates: 70°51′28″N 29°05′10″E
- Country: Norway
- Region: Northern Norway
- County: Finnmark
- District: Øst-Finnmark
- Municipality: Berlevåg

Area
  - Total: 0.7 km^{2} (0.27 sq mi)
- Elevation: 1 m (3.3 ft)

Population (2017)
  - Total: 948
  - Density: 1,354/km^{2} (3,510/sq mi)
- Time zone: UTC+01:00 (CET)
  - Summer (DST): UTC+02:00 (CEST)
- Post Code: 9980 Berlevåg

Berlevåg (Norwegian), Bearalváhki (Northern Sami), or Päärlyvooki (Kven) is the administrative centre of Berlevåg Municipality in Finnmark county, Norway. The village is located on the northeastern coast of the Varanger Peninsula along the Barents Sea. The village lies along Norwegian County Road 890, just east of Berlevåg Airport. The Hurtigruten coastal express boats stop daily at Berlevåg.

The 0.7-square-kilometre (170-acre) village has a population (2023) of 868 and a population density of 1,240 inhabitants per square kilometre (3,200/sq mi). About 97% of the municipal residents live in this village.

Berlevåg is one of the largest fishing villages in Finnmark county. It has several fish processing plants, a large harbor, and public services. Berlevåg Church is located in the village, and Kjølnes Lighthouse is located about 5 kilometres (3.1 mi) to the east of the village. There are four large breakwaters protecting the village from the ocean. They were built between 1913 and 1975.

Berlevåg Airport is located near the village. The Hurtigruten boats also stop here.

== History ==
Near the end of World War II, the Germans retreated from Finnmark county from September 1944 to February 1945 and they used scorched earth tactics and all buildings in Berlevåg were burned down.

Berlevåg became famous when the movie Heftig og begeistret about the Berlevåg Men's Choir had great success in 2001. Berlevåg is also coincidentally the name of the village where Karen Blixen's novel Babette's Feast is set.

In June 2022, a production facility to generate hydrogen opened in Berlevåg. The pilot project uses electricity from windmills to generate hydrogen through an electrolyser.
