= 2023 heat waves =

List of heat waves

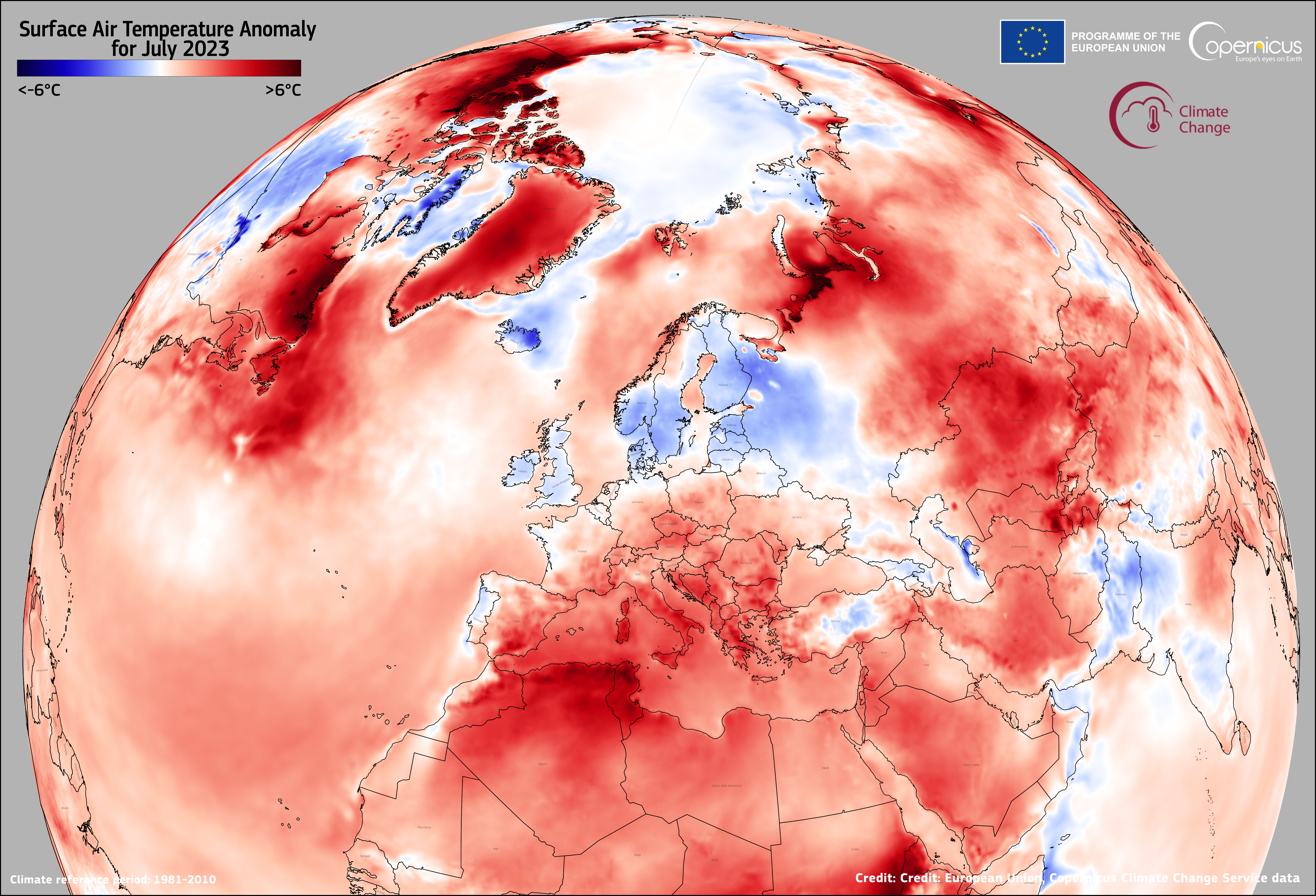
With a deviation of over 0.7 °C from the average of the years 1991 to 2020, July 2023 marks the warmest July ever recorded. Numerous regions in the Northern Hemisphere, particularly in southern Europe, went through severe heatwaves, with anomalies of +4 °C in Italy, Greece, and Spain. Additionally, North Africa and the Canadian Arctic saw notably high temperatures, reaching peak anomalies of +5 °C and +7 °C, respectively. More detailed information can be found in the C3S Climate Bulletin.

A number of heat waves began across parts of the northern hemisphere in April 2023. Various heat records have been broken, with July being the hottest month ever recorded.

Scientists have attributed the heat waves to man-made climate change. Another cause is the El Niño phenomena which began to develop in 2023. However, recent findings show that climate change is exacerbating the strength of El Niño.

The heatwaves caused severe damage in areas such as the western United States, southern Europe, and parts of Asia. The abnormal temperatures have led to a "very extreme" likelihood of wildfires, according to the Fire Weather Index.

The heatwaves were also occurring alongside some unusually heavy flooding (i.e. the 2023 European floods).

In response to the heatwave some leaders called for greater action to stop climate change. US President Joe Biden took some measures to protect the population from extreme heat.

== Background ==
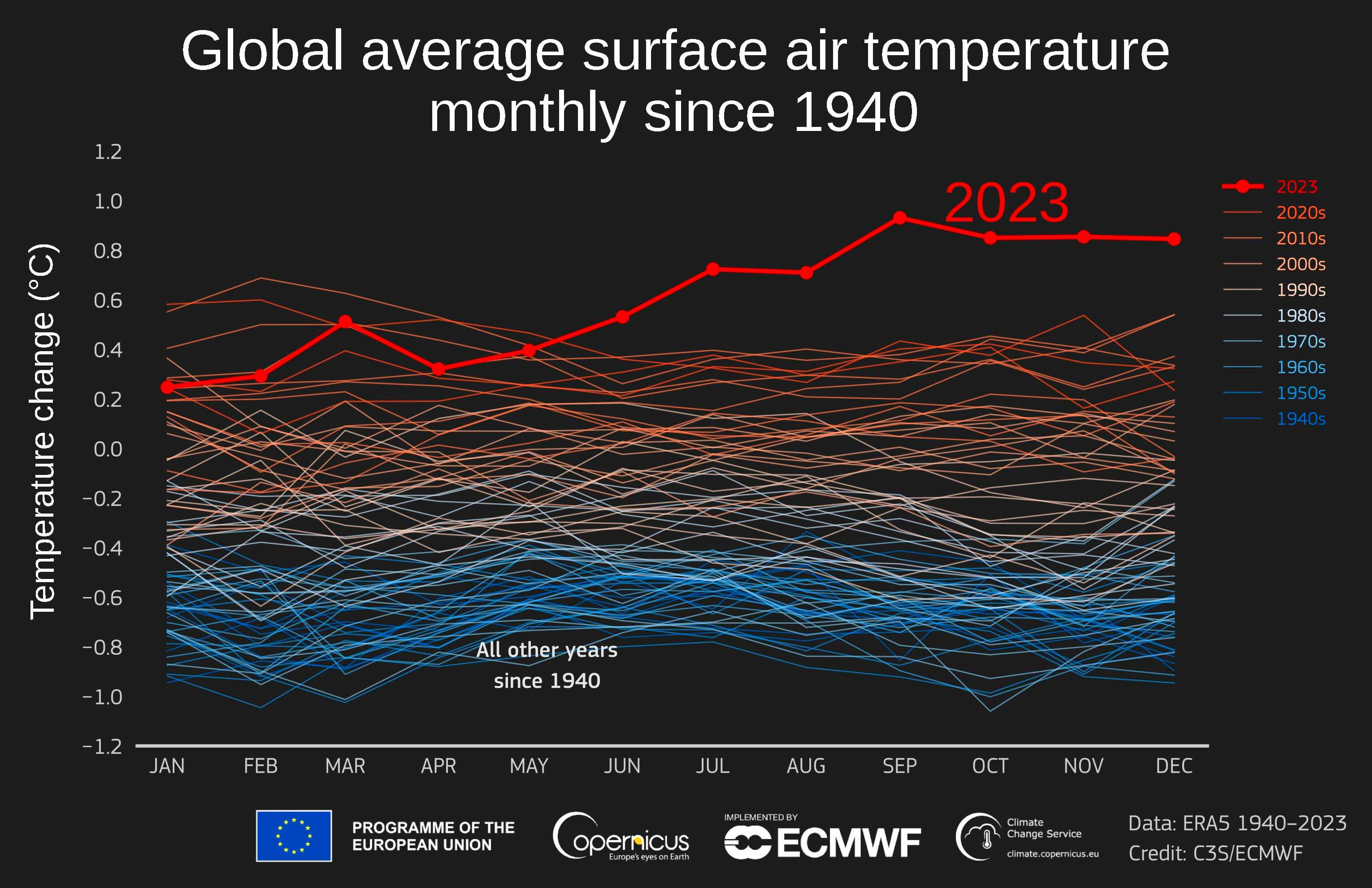
2023 saw the highest global average surface temperature in recorded history.

2023's June–July–August season was the warmest on record globally by a large margin, as El Niño conditions continued to develop.

September 2023 was the warmest September on record globally, with an average surface air temperature 0.5 °C above the temperature of the previous warmest September (2020).

Heat waves are one of the deadliest hazards, and in line with the IPCC prediction their frequency and magnitude are rising due to man-made climate change. The July heat wave in Southern Europe and North America would be virtually impossible and the heat wave in China would be a 1 in 250-year event without climate change. But due to climate change those events are now common.

July 2023 was the hottest July on Earth in the last 120,000 years and the hottest July from the beginning of temperature measurement with a wide margin. During each day in July 2023, two billion people experienced heat conditions made at least three times more likely due to climate change and 6.5 billion people experienced this impact at least one day in the month.

Another cause is the El Niño phenomena which began to develop in 2023. El Niño begin when parts of the Pacific Ocean became warmer than average and generally cause a rise in the global temperature as it "is moving some of the energy up from depth and dumping it into the atmosphere", However, recent findings show that climate change is exacerbating the strength of El Niño. It is increasing "the "variability" of the El Niño-Southern Oscillation" creating both stronger El Niño and La Niña events.

Climate change may also cause changes in the jet streams that probably contributed to the heat waves. Warming in certain Arctic regions makes the jet stream weaker and wavier, causing different weather patterns to stay longer over the same place.

== International ==
2023 was the hottest year on record, 1.48 °C warmer than the pre-industrial level.

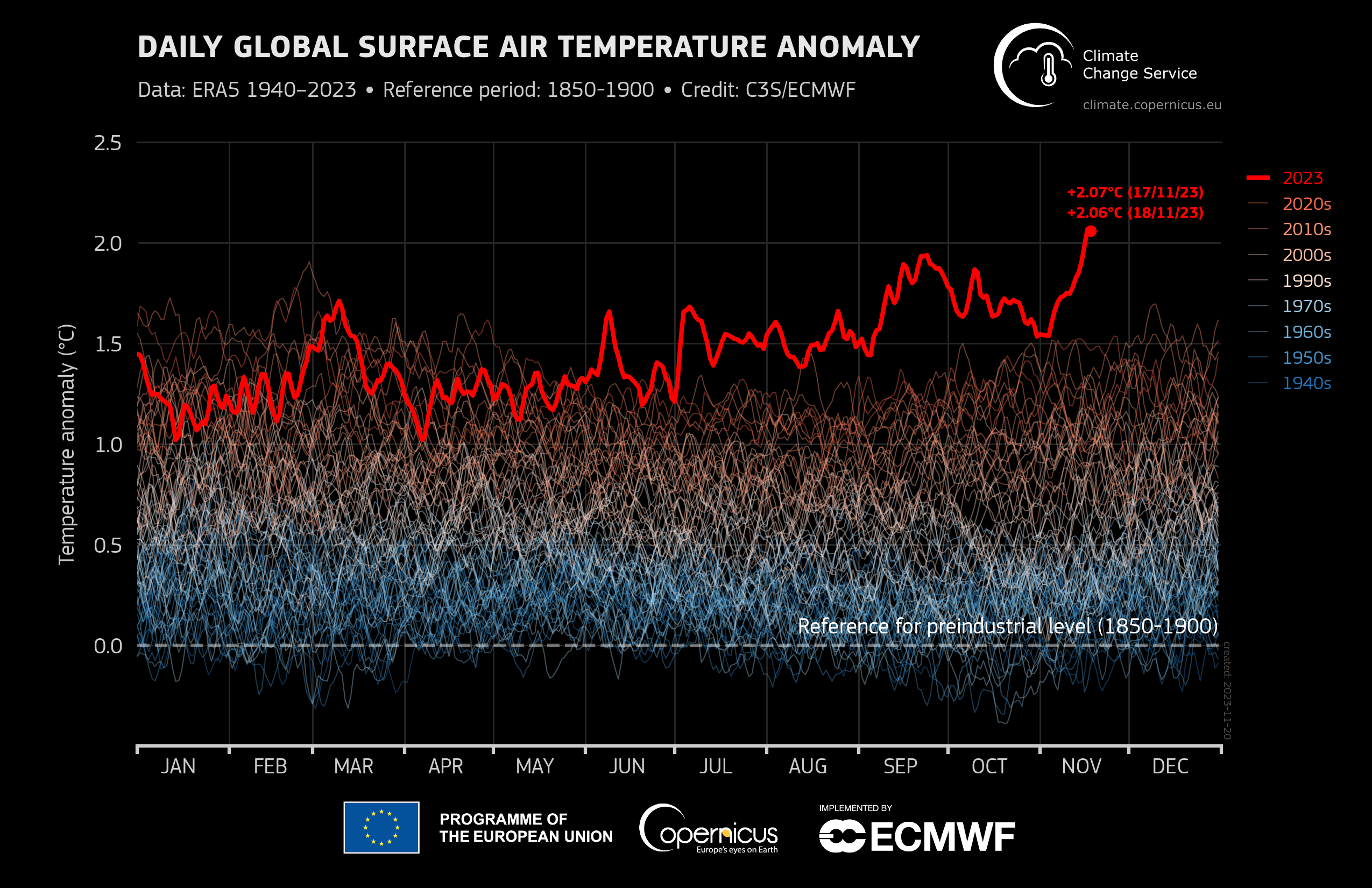
2023 surface air temperatures breached the 1.5 °C threshold for a record number of days.

The world breached the Paris Agreement 1.5 °C warming mark for a record number of days. From January to September, the global mean temperature was 1.40 °C higher than the pre-industrial average (1850–1900). January 2023 was the seventh warmest on record – 0.25 °C warmer than the normal but 0.33 °C cooler than January 2020. In July, the global average temperature was 17.32 °C (63.17 °F).

== Oceans ==
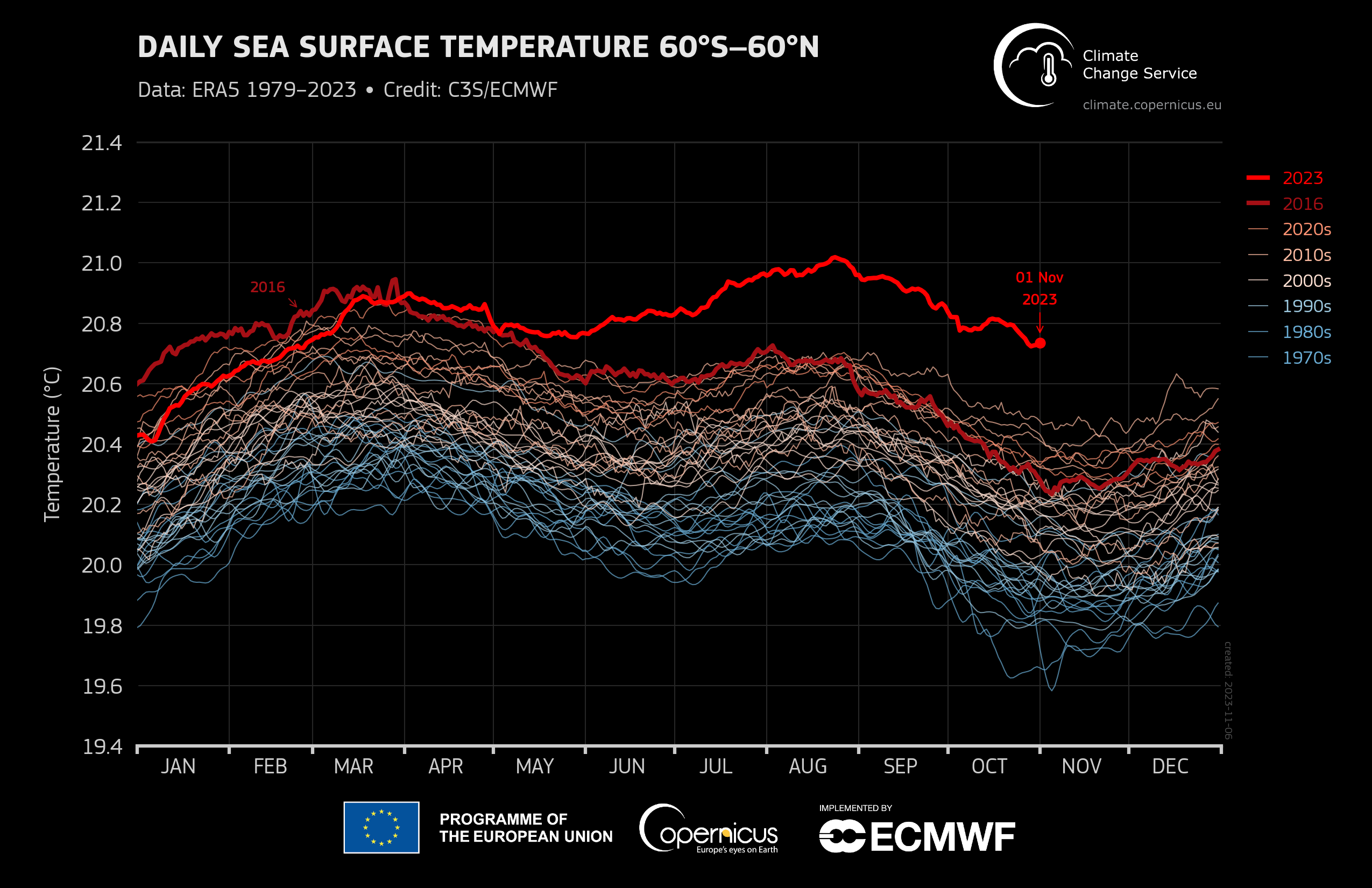
Sea surface temperatures from mid 2023 exceeded previous records in extrapolar regions (between 60° north and 60° south latitudes).

Above-average temperatures in the northeastern South Pacific were recorded in March 2023. The average sea temperature of the North Atlantic Ocean was 19.9 °C (67.8 °F) on 5 March, exceeding the previous record set in 2020 by 0.1 °C. On 5 June, the recorded temperature rose to 22.7 °C (72.9 °F), surpassing a record set in 2010 by 0.1 °C. On 1 August 2023, the average sea surface temperature reached 20.96 °C (69.73 °F), the highest ever recorded. In September, the sea ice in Antarctica was far below any previous recorded winter level.

== Africa ==
=== North Africa ===
There was a three-day heatwave in the Western Mediterranean region, originating in North Africa, from 26 to 28 April. The temperature reached over 40 °C (104 °F) in parts of Morocco and Algeria. Morocco, Algeria and Tunisia still reached temperatures of up to 47 °C (117 °F) on 13 July. Another heat wave hit Tabarka, Tunisia, on 14 July.

Data recorded on 18 July showed temperatures of 46.9 °C (116.4 °F) in Tozeur, Tunisia, 47.4 °C (117.3 °F) in Chlef, Algeria (with many other places exceeding 44 °C (111 °F)), and 45.2 °C (113.4 °F) in Kharga, Egypt. There had been a week of power cuts and 40 °C (104 °F) temperatures in Cairo by 19 July.

The heat wave became even more intense in the following days. Data recorded on 23 July showed temperatures of 48.7 °C (119.7 °F) in Algiers, Algeria, the highest recorded temperature in the city, as well as 49 °C (120 °F) temperatures in Kairouan, Tunisia. On 24 July, Tunis, Tunisia reached a temperature of 48.9 °C (120.0 °F). On 24 July, Ghar el-Melh in northern Tunisia reached a temperature of 50 °C (122 °F).

Heavy rain flooded Al-Marj and Derna on 12 September, killing nearly 250 in Derna, Libya. Up to 20,000 were killed on 14 September, as new floods hit Bengazi, Libya.

=== Sub-Saharan Africa ===
Data recorded on 18 July showed temperatures of 45.8 °C (114.4 °F) in the Faya station, Chad and 44.4 °C (111.9 °F) temperatures in Bilma, Niger. 20 July saw temperatures suddenly drop to a seasonal low.

== Asia ==
=== Middle East ===
A heat wave in early June hit Israel, with temperatures between 35 °C (95 °F) in Jerusalem and 45 °C (113 °F) in the Jordan Valley. Along with high winds, the heat wave caused hundreds of bushfires. Roads and some buildings were evacuated amid rolling electricity outages on 2 July. Firefighters quickly controlled the fires, limiting property damage. In Iran, a 66.7 °C (152.1 °F) heat index was recorded at Persian Gulf International Airport on 16 July. Al Ahsa, Saudi Arabia recorded 50.5 °C (122.9 °F) on 18 July.

A local record rainfall was recorded as around 125 kilograms per square meter of rainfall (equivalent to the usual amount for the whole of September) hit Istanbul in under 6 hours on 7 September according to the city's governor as heavy rain fell across north west Turkey's Black Sea coast. Floods also hit houses areas in Igneada district of Kirklareli, Turkey on that day. Heavy rainstorms triggered flash floods across northwest Turkey, killing at least 6 according to the state broadcaster, TRT Haber.

=== Other parts of Asia ===
February 2023 was recorded as the warmest February in India for 122 years. Starting in April 2023, a record-breaking heat wave in Asia has affected multiple countries, including India, China, Laos and Thailand. Turkmenistan recorded 42 °C (108 °F) temperatures in early April. The European Union's Copernicus Atmosphere Monitoring Service said on 26 April that fires started in May continued to burn from Russia's Chelyabinsk, Omsk and Novosibirsk Oblasts, Primorye Krai, Kazakhstan and Mongolia. Temperatures over 40 °C (104 °F) were recorded in Uzbekistan, Kazakhstan and China on 31 May.

Beijing hit 40 °C (104 °F) on 6 June after ten days of temperatures above 35 °C (95 °F). The government ordered all employers to stop any outdoor work and for people to work from home if possible. Parts of Mongolia recorded 30 °C (86 °F), especially in eastern steppe and southern Gobi provinces, with a prediction of 38 °C (100 °F) for 21 June, in the Khanbogd Soum. Heatstroke claimed 22 lives in Mardan and Islamabad, Pakistan on 26 June.

On 16 July, China recorded a record-breaking temperature of 52.2 °C (126.0 °F) at Aydang, Turpan, Xinjiang Province as well as Sanbao, China. Temperatures above 35 °C (95 °F) persisted for four weeks in Beijing. The Japanese government and NHK issued health advice to the general public as heatstroke alerts for 20 of the country's 47 prefectures, mostly east and southwest on 16 July. Temperatures nearing 40 °C (104 °F) were recorded in Kiryu city, Gunma Prefecture, Hachioji in western Tokyo, Hirono town in Fukushima Prefecture and Nasushiobara.

Torrential rain poured down in northern Japan, causing floods and a resultant landslide on 16 July.

The Korea Meteorological Administration (KMA) issued a heat wave warning on the 19th and warned people to expected temperatures of 33 °C for the foreseeable future, with southern Gangwon Province, North Chungcheong Province and some southern regions to see some rain which was expected to be about 5 to 20 millimetres in total depth on the 19th.

On the 20th a heatwave is declared in Mongolia after temperatures of 38 °C (100 °F) continue in the Khanbogd soum.

Japan's government and Fire and Disaster Management Agency responded to the ongoing excessive heat by issuing more health advisory notices to the public on 19 July. The Fire and Disaster Management Agency's official weekly statistics for 19 July showed 8,189 (4,484 were 65 or over) were hospitalized that week, up 200% compared to the previous week and the same week in 2022. Tokyo had the highest number with 1,066, up 460% compared to 2022. 3,215 got heatstroke at home 1,445 got it outside nationwide. 3 people had also died that week as the heat reached 39 °C in many parts of Japan on 19 July.

South Korea and China had reported deadly floods due to unusually heavy rains, leaving several dozen people dead on the 23rd. The record heat continued in Japan and Korea on the 23rd.

The remnants of Typhoon Doksuri hits Hebei province and Beijing, killing 21 people as it did so. 744.8 millimeters (29.3 inches) of rain fell on Beijing between July 26 and August 2 according to the Beijing Meteorological Bureau as Beijing and the province of Hebei had floods that destroyed roads, knocked out power and cut water pipes. Zhuozhou, in Hebei was so badly hit that local police posted a plea on Weibo for lights to assist rescue workers in the devastated city.

==== August ====
It was 35 °C (95 °F) at Seoul, S. Korea on August 4.

33 died on 14 August as a flood induced landslide hit villages in India's Himalayan regions.

==== September ====
Flood induced landslides hit Shimla in the Indian Himalayas on 7 September.

=== October ===
High temperatures, a sand storm and air pollution form a toxic smog over Dushanbe on 8 October.

== Europe ==
=== The Balkans ===
==== July ====
Athens records a temperature of 41 °C (106 °F) and Santorini hits 41 °C (106 °F) on 19 July 2023.

Bush fires hit Rhodes on 22 and 23 July.

Bush fires hit Lardos and Kiotari, Greece on 23 July. Rhodes was 49 °C (120 °F) on the 23rd, with the evacuation of tourists starting that day. Eight EU countries sent firemen to help Greece, while Israel, Jordan and Turkey sent mostly aerial equipment to the Greek fire brigade.

Corfu is hit by forest and bush fires. Tourists are evacuated from Corfu in response on the 25th.

Albania set its all-time high temperature record at 44 °C (111 °F) in Kuçovë on 24 July.

Wildfires hit Turkey, Bulgaria, Croatia, Albania, North Macedonia, Greece and southern Italy on the 26th and 27th.

The 27th saw wild fires in and around Sicily, Dubrovnik, Rhodes, Gran Canaria, Lisbon and Cascais in Portugal.

==== August ====
Heavy rain causes mass flooding in Slovenia on the 6th and 7th, killing seven people and causing over $500 million worth of damage over 66% of the nation's area and is reported as the worst natural disaster to have hit the country in history.

Over 600 firefighters from Greece and several other European countries, along with a fleet of water-dropping planes and helicopters, fought major wildfires in Greece, 20 people have died in the fires by 27 August.

==== September ====
Heavy rainstorms hit Greece, Turkey and Bulgaria on 7 September, killing 11 leading to the declaration of a state of emergency in the affected region of Bulgaria.

Heavy rains hit the Pagasetic Gulf and central Greece. Kala Nera village and the nearby port city of Volos were flooded by heavy rains on 7 September in which 2 people died. Larissa was evacuated due to heavy flooding, central Greece, on 7 September. The Greek Minister of Climate Crisis and Civil Protection Vassilis Kikilias urged people to stay indoors on 7 September.

Heavy floods along Bulgaria's Black Sea coast triggered a state of emergency in that region of Bulgaria on 7 September.

=== The Iberian Peninsula ===
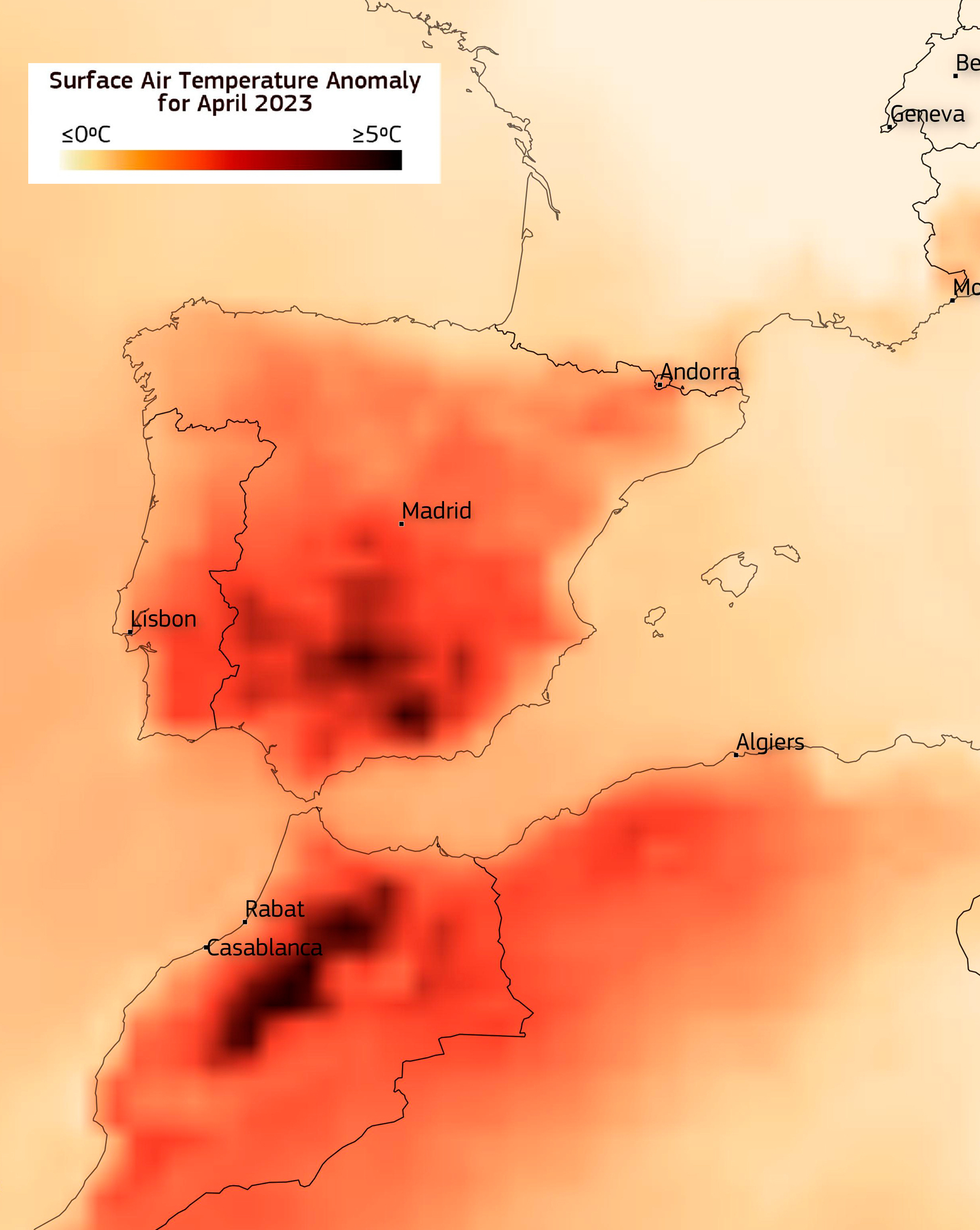
A temperature anomaly map for April 2023 showing the range of the heat wave.

==== April ====
Europe broke its temperature record for April when the air at Córdoba Airport reached 38.8 °C (101.8 °F). On 26 April, a Sentinel-2 image showed that the Fuente de Piedra Lagoon went completely dry for the first time. A rapid attribution study by World Weather Attribution found that the heatwave would probably have been more than 2 °C cooler without climate change and that climate change made the heat wave 100 times more likely to occur.

==== July ====
Temerities for 19 July 2023 stood at.

1. Seville 41 °C (106 °F).
2. Madrid 37 °C (99 °F).
3. Catalonia- 45.3 C (113 F) (an all-time record).

A forest fire hit La Palma on 22 July that led to 500 people being evacuated. The 27th saw wild fires in and around Sicily, Dubrovnik, Rhodes, Gran Canaria, Lisbon and Cascais in Portugal.

==== August ====
Forest fires hit 19 villages in the Algarve, including Odeceixe and Monchique, on the 8th.

The highest recorded temperature of 46.8 °C (116.2 °F) was reached in Valencia on 11 August. Intense Heatwave conditions, the third such occurrence this summer, were expected to continue in the coming days and week over the Mediterranean region. Wild fires occur across Tenerife on 16 August. Major wildfires hit Tenarife on that day. Parts of the island of Mallorca was put under yellow and orange weather alerts. Palma police reported felled trees and weather induced damage to buildings in the city. As storms lashed Palma Port the P&O Cruises ship Britannia broke free of its mooring and collided with another ship. The wind had gusts of up to 100 km/h on 28 August.

==== September ====
Heavy rain hits Spain on 3 September and 4 September. Madrid's Mayor, José Luis Martínez-Almeida, told people to stay indoors and said the 1972 rain fall record had been broken with a volume approaching 120 litres per square metre on 4 September.

The Spanish National Weather Agency declared a nationwide red alert for flooding due to extreme rain fall. A man died during a flood in Villamanta as unusually high amounts of hail and rain hit regions of Castile, Catalonia and Valencia on 5 September.

=== UK and Ireland ===
June

June 2023 was the warmest June on recorded for both Ireland and the UK, by average temperature.

==== July ====
July 2023 in Lancashire, Merseyside, Greater Manchester and Northern Ireland record the wettest July ever with Lancashire's being the wettest on record with 247% of normal rainfall levels.

==== September ====
In Ireland, a rare tropical night was recorded in Valentia, Kerry on 5 September, with the overnight temperature not dropping below 22.3 °C (72.1 °F) at the weather station.

A high temperature warning was also issued for parts of Ireland on 7 September, as some parts of the country were forecast to reach as high as 31 °C (88 °F).

The Port Clarence and Stockton Village districts of Teesside were flooded on 5 September.

Heavy fog and 25 °C (77 °F) hit Langland Bay near Swansea and Barry Island Cardiff Bay on 10 September.

Heavy rain induced floods hit Exeter in Devon on 24 September.

The A83 was hit by seven landslides. The Met Office issued an amber flood warning that morning in Angus, Perth and Kinross, Aberdeenshire, Moray and Highland until 2:00pm the next day. The A83 between Tarbet and Lochgilphead was blocked by a major landslide.

Heavy rain induced flooding hits several places in Wales on 22 September.

Heavy rain induced flooding hits parts of Greater London on 26 September.

Major rain induced flooding and landslides hit Scotland between 28 September and 10 October.

==== October ====
Over a month's worth of rain fell in 24 hours over Scotland on 7 October.

Temperatures reached 23 °C (74 °F) during a warm spell across eastern Ireland on 8 October.

Trains are canceled as emergency repairs occur on the line between Morpth and Newcastle on 9 October.

The Whitesands flood protection scheme in Dumfries is given the go-ahead by Dumfries and Galloway Council on 6 October.

Midday temperatures in Oxford and Banbury UK, hit 14 °C (57 °F) on 9 October.

=== Rest of Europe ===
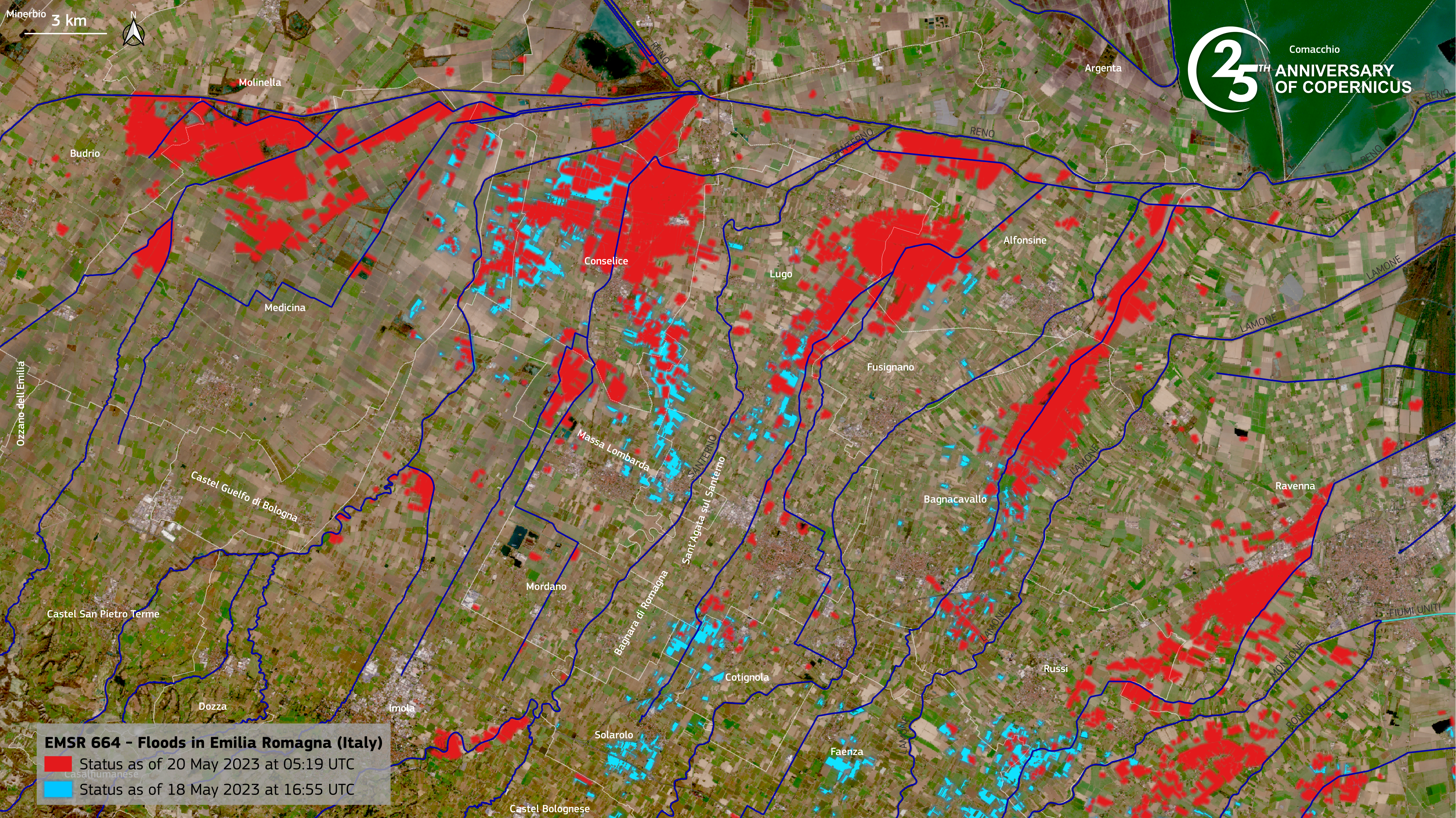
The extent of the Emilia-Romagna floods on 18–20 May 2023.

==== July ====
Northern Norway's Slettnes Lighthouse, reached 28.8 °C (83.8 °F) on 13 July

A major extended heatwave affecting most of Europe through mid-July was named "Cerberus" by the Italian Meteorological Society and brought record temperatures into the Arctic.

On July 18, temperatures reached as high as:

1. Sardinia 47 °C (117 °F) or 46 °C (115 °F).
2. Rome 41.8 °C (107.2 °F) 42.9 C, or 109F (an all-time record).
3. Sicily- 46.3 C (115 F) (an all-time record). 19 July 2023

16 Italian cities were under red alerts for heat, including Rome, Florence and Bologna on 23 July.

Officially, the air temperature reached 48.0 °C (118.4 °F) on 24 July at Jerzu, Sardinia during the heatwave which if validated, would be the highest temperature recorded in Europe during the month of July

1 died and 15 were hurt as a storm hits La Chaux-de-Fonds in northwestern Switzerland on the 23rd.

The 27th saw wild fires in and around Sicily, Dubrovnik, Rhodes, Gran Canaria, Lisbon and Cascais in Portugal.

==== August ====
In Ukraine, the temperature reached 40 °C (104 °F), around Zaporizhzhia and lake in Sloviansk on August 5.

30 cm of hail fell on the German city of Reutlingen on August 5.

Floods and landslides hit southern Norway on August 9. A poorly built dam on the Glåma River, at the Braskereidfoss hydroelectric power plant collapses.

3,500 were evacuated from forest fires in Argeles-sur-Mer, France on 16 August. Major wildfires hit Tenarife on that day.

It reaches 30 °C (86 °F) in the Alpes-Maritimes, Var, Hautes-Alpes and Alpes-de-Haute-Provence departments in the Provence-Alpes-Côte d'Azur (PACA) region of France on 17 August.

The district office of Garmisch-Partenkirchen in Bavaria, declared a state of disaster in the municipality of Bad Bayersoien, after 80% of its building were seriously damaged by 8 cm hailstones on 27 August.

The temperature hit 43.2 °C (109.8 °F) in and Menton Carcassonne, 42.5 °C (108.5 °F) Toulouse and 30.4 °C (86.7 °F) in the rest of France on 23 August.

The Poppea cyclone struck the Ligurian Sea in Northern Italy causing landslides and floods have washed away roads overlooking Lake Como on 27 August. Flash floods hit Genoa on 28 August and Sondrio as flood alerts remained in place in Piedmont and Lombardy remained in place on that day.

Over 100mm of rain fell in regions of Vorarlberg, Tyrol, Salzburg and Carinthia causing evacuations, rail routes and bridges were closed due to flash flooding in Bad Gastein, Salzburg on 29 August.

== North America ==
=== May ===
Arviat, Nunavut recorded 21.2 °C (70.2 °F) on 13 May. Monthly record highs were also set in several cities in the Pacific Northwest during that time.

=== June ===
An intense heat wave impacted Puerto Rico and the Caribbean in early June, bringing record highs to San Juan and causing the heat index to reach 125 °F (52 °C) in one town.

In Mexico, Merida, Yucatan reached it highest recorded heat index of 55.6 °C (132.1 °F) on June 11, surpassed the next day to reach 56.1 °C (133.0 °F); the air temperature was nearly 41 °C (106 °F).

The heat wave swept northern states, such as Sonora where temperatures (before the heat index) were recorded as high as 49 °C (120 °F). Over 100 people died from heat stroke or dehydration.

=== July ===
In Canada on July 8 Norman Wells, Northwest Territories, at 65°N, reached 37.9 °C (100.2 °F), the first temperature over 37.8 °C (100 °F) this far north. Massive wildfires, consuming more land area in Canada this year than ever recorded continued to rage in the area.

Canada recorded 3 new temperature highs on 11 July:

1. 37.4 °C (99.3 °F) in Fort Good Hope, Northwest Territories (NWT)
2. 37.9C (100.2F), in Norman Wells, Northwest Territories (NWT)
3. 37.8 °C (100.0 °F) in Ottawa.

Miami broke its record for the most consecutive days with the heat index exceeding over 100 °F (38 °C) ending on July 26 after 46 days.

Death Valley recorded a daily record high of 128 °F (53.3 °C) on July 16 surpassing the previous marks of 127 °F in 1972 and 2005.

In the United States, "an extreme heat wave" affected many states including Texas, New Mexico, Arizona, Nevada, and California. Temperatures reached as high as 53 °C (128 °F) in Death Valley, while Phoenix reached 48 °C (119 °F) on a few days and broke the previous record of 18 consecutive days exceeding 110 °F (43 °C), for a total of 31 consecutive days (every day in July). Heat warnings were issued across many southern states as far east as Florida, where record high ocean temperatures were observed. The U.S. National Weather Service (NWS) issued its first ever excessive heat advisory for Miami, Florida on July 17, 2023.

Phoenix recorded its all-time high minimum temperature of 97 °F (36.1 °C) on July 19 surpassing the previous record of 96 °F on July 15, 2003. Phoenix also broke its record for most consecutive days with highs over 110 °F (43.3 °C) ending on July 30 after 31 days exceeding the previous streak of 18 days back in 1974 by a significant margin.

On July 31 the Eagle Bluff Fire triggered the evacuation of Osoyoos, British Columbia. Both US and Canadian officials estimated that around 890 ha (2,200 acres) on the Canadian side of the border were on fire due to extended dryness and heat in June into July, due to seasonally high temperatures of 31–32 °C (88–90 °F) at the time of the fire. 2,000 acres (3.13 square miles) on the US side of the border burned. One firefighter died on the Canadian side. 1,500 blazes were burning in Washington State and British Columbia that day and 101 were out of control.

=== August ===
California's week old York Fire was the state's biggest that year by August 1, at over 125 square miles (323.7 square kilometers) and was 23% contained according to Californian fire officials. About 400 firefighters were fighting the blaze and had to balance their efforts with concerns about disrupting the fragile ecosystem in California's Mojave National Preserve.

Wildfires burned down Kaanapali, north of the town of Lahaina, Hawaii on the 10th.

20,000 evacuated from Yellowknife 11 August and near Ndılǫ, Dettah and Ingraham Trail on 1 August. Enterprise was mostly destroyed and Hay River was endangered by the fires.

A major heat wave affected the Midwestern United States on August 23 and 24. Prior to the heat wave, 126 million Americans were under heat alerts. At Chicago O'Hare International Airport, temperatures hit 98 °F (37 °C) on August 23, with a heat index reaching 116 °F (47 °C). On August 24, temperatures hit 100 °F (38 °C) at O'Hare with a heat index of 120 °F (49 °C). The high on August 24 also became the latest in-season high of 100 °F (38 °C) for Chicago, while the heat index was the hottest on record. In Rockford, the high reached 97 °F (36 °C), with a heat index of 118 °F (48 °C) due to dew points of 81 °F (27 °C). In Des Moines, Iowa, the high on August 23 broke a daily record at 100 °F (38 °C), and the heat index of 115 °F (46 °C) became the highest heat index in August. By August 24, Des Moines had recorded 6 consecutive days with heat indexes above 100 °F (38 °C). On August 27, New Orleans reached an all-time record high of 105 °F (41 °C).

Maui County Emergency Management Agency announced the end of its bush fire evacuation order on 27 August.

=== September ===
A major heat wave took place in the northern portion of the United States, especially around Minnesota around the first few days of September 2023. Maximum temperatures were above 90 °F (32 °C) throughout almost the entire state of Minnesota, with some areas of the state recording temperatures above 100 °F (38 °C). The Twin Cities had its hottest Labor Day on record with a maximum temperature of 98 °F (37 °C). A monthly record was also set that day in Marquette, Michigan at 95 °F (35 °C). The next day, a monthly record was tied at Abilene, Texas, with a high of 107 °F (42 °C), with daily records also being broken in Raleigh, North Carolina; Washington, D.C.; Alpena, Michigan; Concord, New Hampshire; and Islip, New York. The next day, Dulles International Airport recorded their hottest September temperature ever, at 100 °F (38 °C). By September 7, New York City had their first official heat wave all year. That day, sports in Suffolk County, New York, were postponed until at least 6 p.m. due to heat index values of 96 °F (36 °C). The heat index in Newark, New Jersey, reached 106 °F (41 °C), with the air temperature of 97 °F (36 °C) being a record for September 7. By September 8, Philadelphia's heat wave reached six days, with two records being set both on the high and low temperature during that six day timeframe. On that day, monthly record warm low temperatures were set at Islip and Caribou, Maine. The first 13 days of September were the warmest on record in Philadelphia.

The 0% contained Oregon Road Fire and the 10% contained 2-day-old Grays Fire had killed 2 people so far and covered 10,000 acres of woodland. Mass evacuations occurred in case wildfires engulfed the threatened towns of Medical Lake and Four Lakes. Spokane County Emergency Management said the Grays Fire had stopped growing towards Medical Lake and Four Lakes on 3 September.

Yellowknife and West Kelowna were threatened by major forest fires on 18 September and Yellowknife was evacuated

One person had died and at least 185 buildings were destroyed after a 0% contained 15-square-mile wind-driven wildfire spread out west side of Medical Lake, west of Spokane on 18 September and 19 September.

Canada recorded its most severe wildfire season to date, with a total of just over 1,000 active fires on 18 September; 236 were in the usually colder Northwest Territories, which had so far consumed over 2,000,000 hectares of land and the evacuation of over half of the territory's population. Major forest fires begin to approach Yellowknife. West Kelowna's firefighters were losing the battle with the 10,500 hectares 0% contained McDougall Creek wildfire, resulting in the evacuation of thousands of residents in West Kelowna and north of nearby Kelowna. The premier of British Columbia declared a state of emergency and further evacuations from the cities to the east of Vancouver.

=== October ===
A late season heat wave took place in a large part of the United States, starting on September 30 and continuing into October 3, especially in the northern states such as Minnesota. At least 15 US states had recorded temperatures of 90 °F (32 °C) and above, with some areas experiencing temperatures above 100 °F (38 °C) as far north as Iowa. This heat wave was notable for record high minimum temperature, with International Falls reaching its record high minimum temperature for October on October 2 with a temperature of 69 °F (21 °C) and a high of 87 °F (30.5 °C). The heat wave resulted in a cancellation of the Twin Cities Marathon for the first time in its history since it began in 1982. The lakes were warm enough to go swimming in many parts of Minnesota. Temperatures in Minneapolis reached 92 °F (33 °C), the warmest ever for October. The heat spread east on October 3, and in Canada, Ottawa set monthly record on October 3, at 30.9 °C (87.6 °F). On October 4, monthly record high temperatures were reached with temperatures of 89 °F (32 °C) in Syracuse, New York, and 86 °F (30 °C) in Burlington, Vermont, In Montreal, the temperature reached 28.9 °C (84.0 °F) with a humidex of 33, considered "exceptional" for that time of year. Montreal also recorded a record high on October 5, before the heat wave broke.

== Central America ==
=== July ===
The Panamanian Institute of Meteorology and Hydrology issues public health advice as it reports temperatures of 42 °C (108 °F) in Panama City, with abnormal high heat in Chiriqui, Veraguas, Los Santos, Herrera, Cocle, West Panama, Colon, Darien, Guna Yala and Embera Wounan regions on July 29.

== South America ==
=== August ===
On August 2, 2023, a heat wave hit South America, leading to temperatures in many areas above 95 °F (35 °C) in midwinter with some locations setting all-time heat records.

12 August saw Rio de Janeiro break a 117-year heat record. Chile saw highs towards 40C and Bolivia saw temperatures rise badly Asunción saw 33 °C (91 °F).

=== November ===
On November 8, 2023, Brazil was hit by another heat wave. Rio de Janeiro had the warmest day of the year, with temperatures reaching 42.5 °C (108.5 °F) on November 12. The city also had a real-feel temperature of 58.5 °C (137.3 °F) on November 14, the highest since 2014.

== Australia ==
=== February ===
The Bureau of Meteorology forecast heatwaves occurring around Australia over the next few days and had already put high-temperature warnings in place in all of Australia's states except for the Australian Capital Territory, Jervis Bay Territory and the Northern Territory on 15 February.

== Russian Federation ==
=== April ===
The head of the Ministry of Emergency Situations, Alexander Kurenkov, traveled to the fire that hit Kurgan Oblast on 26 April.

The European Union's Copernicus Atmosphere Monitoring Service said on 26 April that fires started in May continued to burn from Russia's Chelyabinsk, Omsk and Novosibirsk Oblasts, Primorye Krai, Kazakhstan and Mongolia.

=== May ===
80 fires were active over an area of 113,500 hectares (280,000 acres) in the regions of the Ural Federal District on 8 May.

=== June ===
37.9 degrees Celsius (100.2 Fahrenheit) was recorded in Jalturovosk on 3 June.

8 June data was recorded at

1. 38.0 °C (100.4 °F) Zdvinsk
2. 35.6 °C (96.1 °F) Tomsk tie
3. 38.0 °C (100.4 °F) Verkhoyansk
4. 38.2 °C (100.8 °F) Kupino
5. 36.7 °C (98.1 °F) Kolyvan
6. 36.3 °C (97.3 °F) Ermakovskoe
7. 35.3 °C (95.5 °F) Tastyp

It was revealed on 8 June that the wildfires in Russia's Ural Mountains during May had killed at least 21 people.

=== July ===
On 11 July 2023 in Yekaterinburg (56° north latitude) in Russia for the first time in the history of meteorological observations (more than 187 years), a temperature of +40 °C (104 °F) was recorded and Verkhoyansk, in Russia's Sakha Republic, recorded a temperature of 38 °C (100 °F) on 11 July.

=== August ===
3 August saw predictions of heatwave on 5 August in the Krasnodar Krai.

A large fire occurred on 29 August in the Gelendzhik in Krasnodar Krai area and had an area of fifty thousand square meters according to the Russian Ministry of Emergency Management. The strong winds fanned the flames that day. 195 people, 45 firefighting units, a Mi-8 helicopter helped fight the fire, but the helicopter is grounded at night. The local administration of Gelendzhik called on the local residents to help in fight the fire.

== Political, charity, NGO, UN, scientific and corporate responses ==
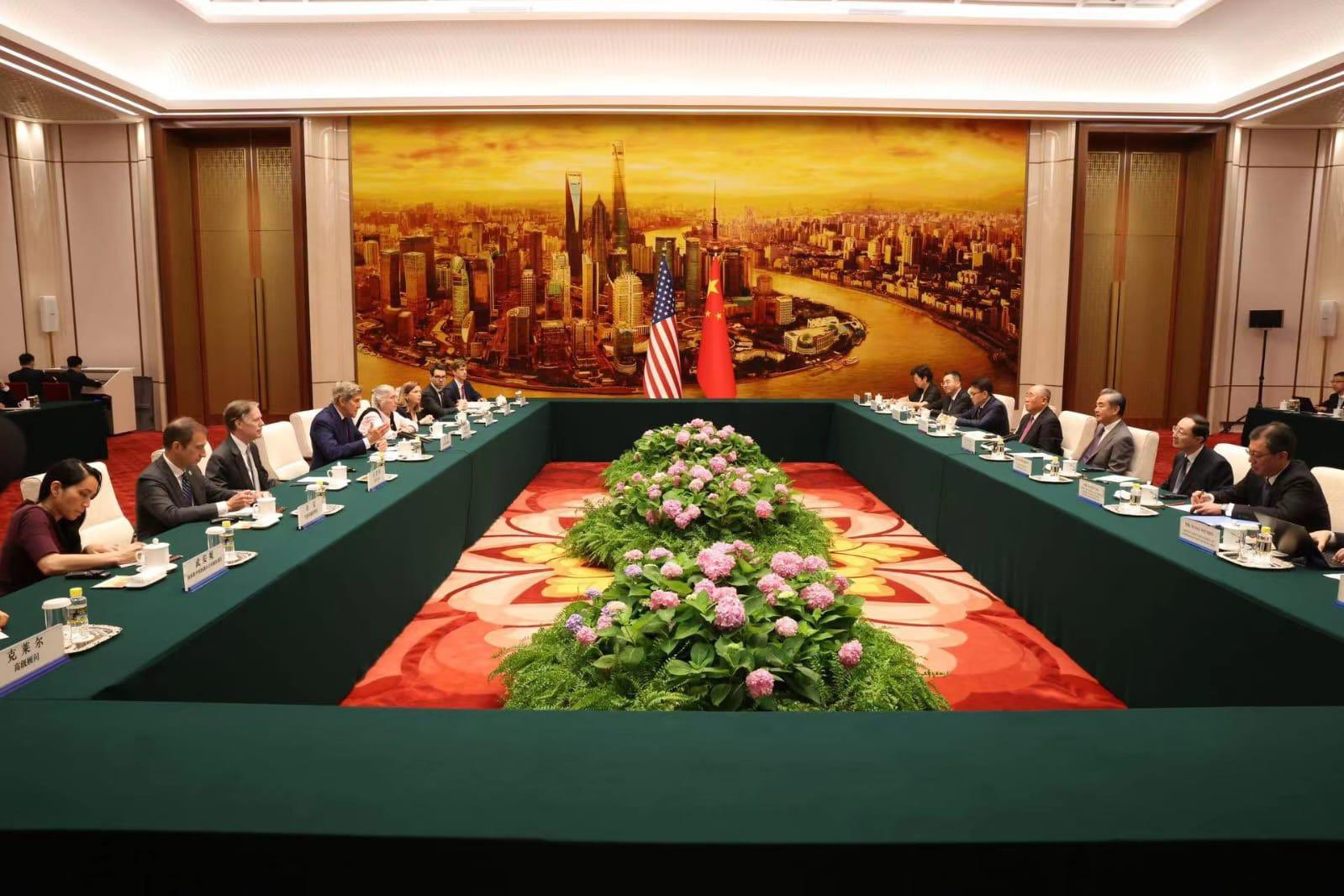
China's top diplomat Wang Yi met with United States Special Presidential Envoy for Climate John Kerry in Beijing on 18 July 2023

China's top diplomat Wang Yi and American diplomat John Kerry called for "global leadership" on climate issues.

Some meteorological scientists officially blamed climate change for the event. A marine heat wave roughly 60 miles off California's coast was accused by meteorologists of helping fuel Hurricane Hilary.

On August 2, Xi Jinping, General Secretary of the Central Committee and the president of China, urged local officials to make every effort to find the 29 individuals who were missing and the people who were trapped.

In the end of July, Joe Biden announced some measures to protect Americans from the heat waves. Those include a safety rules for workers who work outdoors with the mechanism of enforcement, ensuring access to water to communities in danger, improving weather forecasts. The money is partly coming from the Infrastructure Investment and Jobs Act and Inflation Reduction Act. Biden also met the mayors of Phoenix, Arizona and San Antonio to understand better the needs of the cities who were severely impacted by the heatwave. Even before the heatwave some measures already have been taken: cooling centers and more efficient buildings.

== Antarctica ==
The temperatures in an area of east Antarctica, known as "Dome C" was 2 °C (3.6 °F) above normal temperatures on 27 September, unlike March 18, 2022, when it reached at −10 °C (14 °F), 39 °C (70 °F) above normal seasonal heat levels.

== See also ==
- Weather of 2023
- 2023 Slovenia floods
- 2023 Emilia-Romagna floods
- 2023 Asia heat wave
- 2023 European heat waves
- 2023 Western North America heat wave
