= 2023 Pakistan heat wave =

Weather event in Pakistan

Meteorological history
- Duration: March to June 2023
- Heat event

Overall effects
- Fatalities: 22
- Areas affected: Pakistan

In 2023, Pakistan experienced an intense heat wave that lasted from March to June. The Pakistan Meteorological Department (PMD) had warned of higher than usual temperatures during the summer season on 13 March 2023.

== Background ==
Climate change was cited as a contributing factor to the heat wave, with developing countries like Pakistan reported to be particularly vulnerable to extreme weather events and abnormal climatic phenomena. The atmospheric analysis predicted similar conditions for the summer of 2023.

== Response ==
=== Amnesty International ===
Amnesty International called for international action to save Pakistan from severe heat waves, stating that the country is at the forefront of the climate crisis. In their report, released on World Environment Day, they highlighted the vulnerability of Pakistanis to heat waves due to a lack of means to protect themselves from high temperatures.

Amnesty International urged the government to develop plans to protect millions of people from the health impacts of severe heat. The report noted that over 40 million Pakistanis live without electricity and many others experience erratic power supplies due to lengthy outages.

== See also ==
- 2023 Asia heat wave
