= 2023 Western North America heat wave =

- Heat event

Overall effects
- Fatalities: 995: 112 (Mexico); 883 (United States)
- Areas affected: Western North America

Starting in May 2023, a heat wave affected Western North America. The heat wave entailed wildfires in Alberta, record temperatures across Canada and the US, and over 100 deaths in Mexico. The heat also accelerated snow melt in mountain ranges, causing flooding and mudslides. According to scientists, climate change increased the strength of the 2023 heatwaves including in North America.

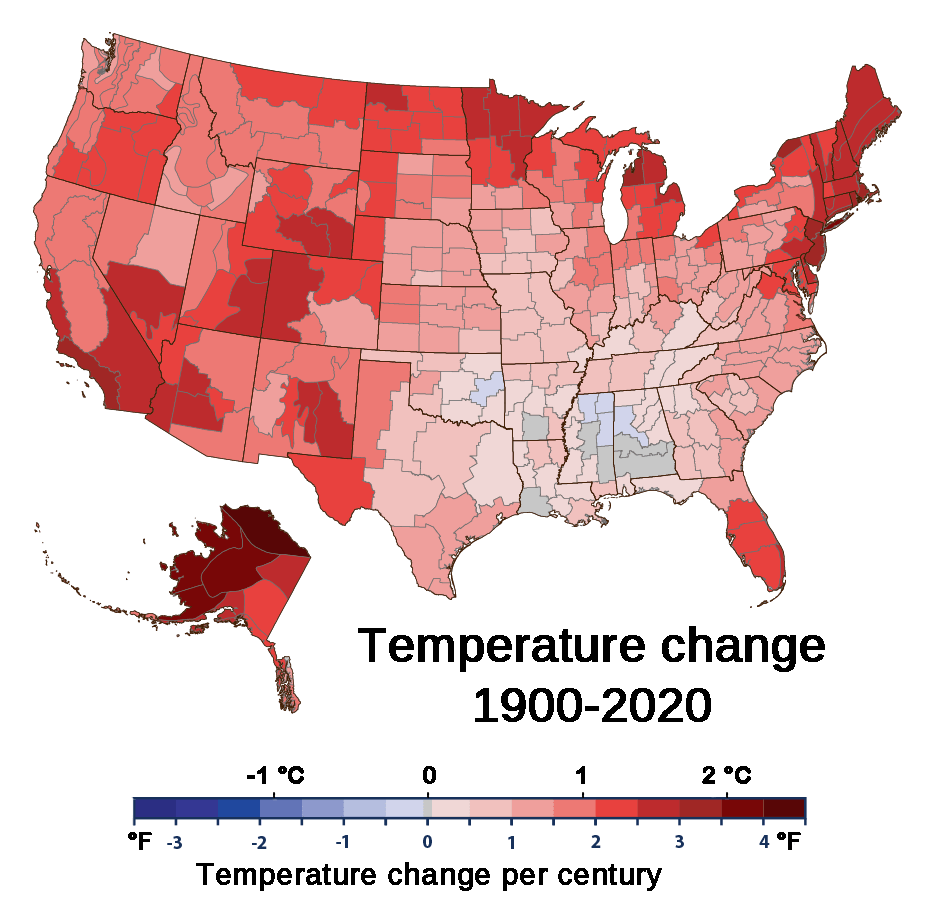
Geographic extent of warming: Average temperatures in almost all regions in the U.S. have increased in the last 120 years.

In recent decades in the U.S., the percentage of record high daily temperatures has predominated over record daily low temperatures, with record daily highs now more than twice that of record daily lows.

== Overview ==
=== Canada ===
The heat wave has fueled the wildfires in Alberta. Environment Canada has issued heat warnings for the northern parts of Alberta and parts of British Columbia. Environment Canada stated, "While the developing heat may result in daily temperature records being broken, it must be emphasized that the expected hot conditions will not approach those reached during the 'Heat Dome' of late June 2021".

On May 13, the hamlet of Arviat, Nunavut reached 21.2 °C (70.2 °F), which was about 7 °C (13 °F) higher than the previous May record. The next day, Squamish, British Columbia reached a record high temperature of 35.5 °C (95.9 °F), and Lytton and Tofino set monthly records of 35.9 °C (96.6 °F) and 28.3 °C (82.9 °F), respectively.

=== United States ===
On May 12, the National Weather Service issued a health advisory between May 13 and 15 for the western parts of Oregon and Washington state.

On May 13, four locations in the Seattle region broke temperature records, with Quillayute reaching 90 °F (32 °C), SeaTac reaching 86 °F (30 °C), and Olympia and Hoquiam reaching 89 °F (32 °C).

On May 14, cities such as Hoquiam, Washington and Florence, Oregon set monthly temperature records, with high temperatures of 90 °F (32 °C) or above. Seattle reached 89 °F (32 °C) the same day. Eugene and Portland reached 94 °F (34 °C) and 92 °F (33 °C), respectively.

The heat has caused the snow on some mountain ranges such as the Sierra Nevada, Colorado Rockies and Cascade Range to melt rapidly, posing danger due to flooding, mudslides and landslides. On May 14, flooding of the Ogden River forced residents of Huntsville, Utah to evacuate their homes, and part of State Route 504 near Mount St. Helens in Cowlitz County, Washington, was destroyed by a mudslide off the Cascade mountains.

In mid-June, more than 100 million individuals, or almost one-third of all Americans, were "under extreme heat advisories".

Phoenix weather record report for July 2023

On July 31, Phoenix, Arizona ended a 31-day streak of high temperatures of over 110 °F (43 °C). The average temperature in Phoenix during July 2023 was 102.7 °F (39.3 °C), the hottest month for any U.S. city in history. On July 19, Phoenix broke their all time warmest low temperature by only falling to 97 °F (36 °C) at night. The extreme heat resulted in 569 deaths in Phoenix.

The summer heat wave resulted in Texas experiencing its second hottest summer on record in 2023, with the full year being its hottest on record. Over 300 people died from heat in Texas in 2023, the most since the state began tracking such deaths in 1989.

=== Mexico ===
Over 100 people died across Mexico as a result of two weeks of heat waves in the country.

== See also ==
- 2021 Western North America heat wave
- 2023 heat waves
