= 2023 Caribbean heat wave =

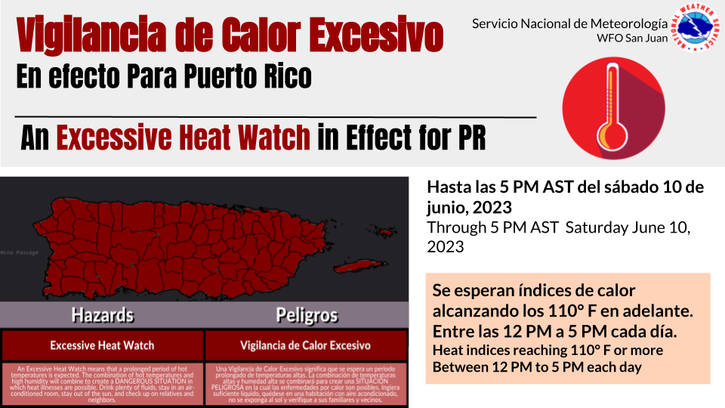
NWS notice of the heat watch in Puerto Rico

The 2023 Caribbean heat wave was one of the heat waves in the series of the 2023 heat waves. It was an intense weather event characterized by prolonged record-breaking temperatures affecting the Caribbean, South Florida, and the Gulf of Mexico.

== History ==
On June 6, 2023, a high-pressure system from east of Puerto Rico combined with dust from the Sahara, increased humidity, and record-breaking Atlantic temperatures (likely exacerbated by climate change) to form a heat dome, which drove the local heat index to historic highs.

In early June 2023, a LUMA Energy power plant failed during high demand, causing a power outage that affected over 100,000 people in Puerto Rico. LUMA Energy urged customers to conserve energy, and most of the service was restored by June 7.

== Statistics ==
The heat index surpassed 110 °F (43 °C) in some areas, with extremes of 125 °F (52 °C) in northern Puerto Rico. High temperatures continued overnight. San Juan set a record-high minimum of 82 °F (28 °C) for three consecutive nights. Additionally, the island of Saba reported a record 92 °F (33 °C), and Aruba reported 95.5 °F (35.3 °C). Sea temperatures also reached record levels in areas over the Atlantic Ocean. On June 7, an excessive heat warning was issued for north-central Puerto Rico and a heat advisory in other areas.
