= Slettnes Nature Reserve =

Important Bird Area of Norway

Coordinates: 71°05′05″N 26°12′07″E

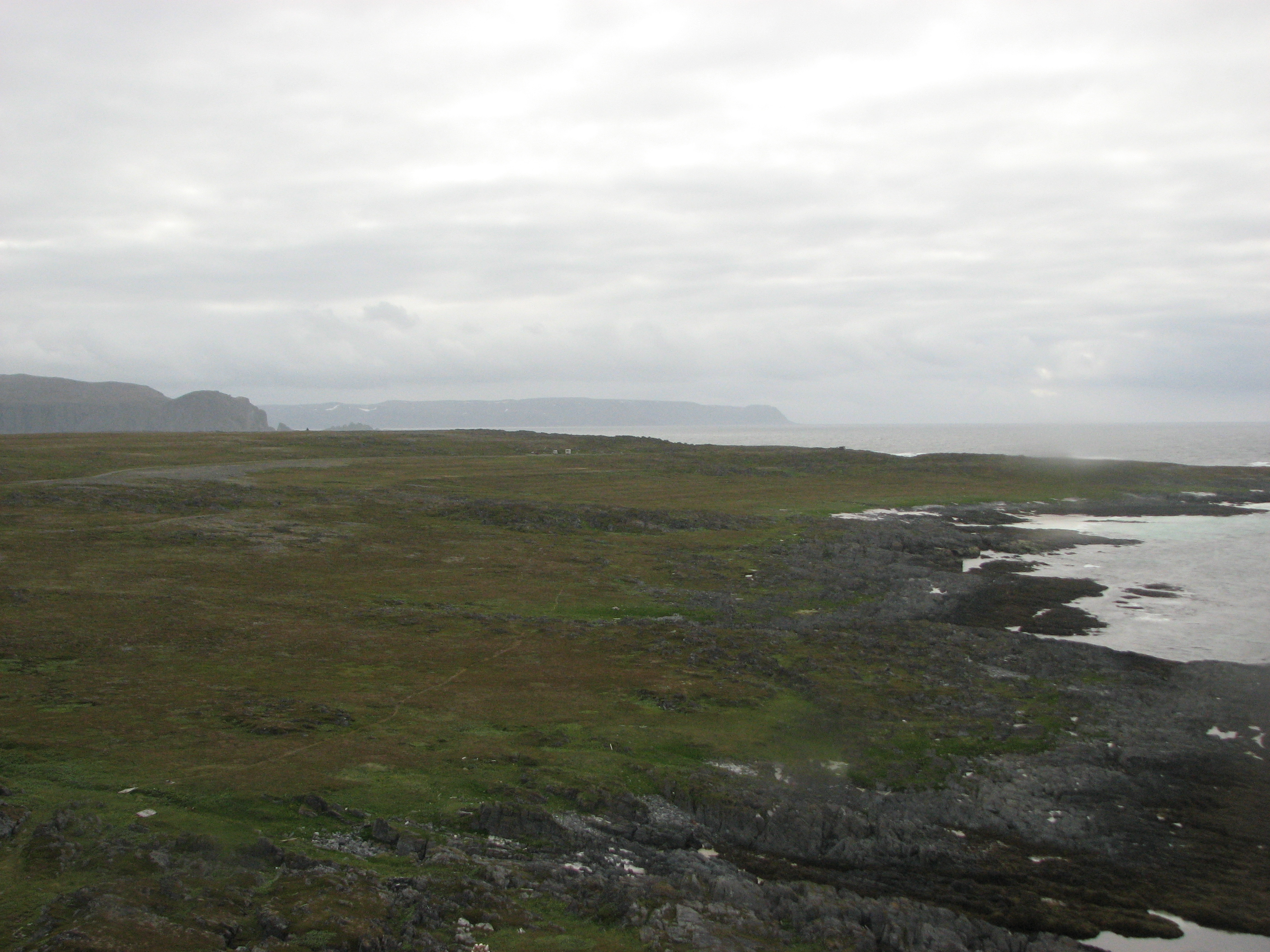
View of the reserve from the lighthouse

The Slettnes Nature Reserve is a 1158 ha protected area of land in Gamvik Municipality in Finnmark county, Norway. It borders the Arctic Barents Sea near the village of Gamvik on the northern coast of the Nordkinn Peninsula. The Slettnes Lighthouse lies within the reserve.

== Environment ==
The reserve largely coincides with the 1230 ha Slettnes Ramsar site and the terrestrial component of the Slettnes Important Bird Area (IBA), designated as such by BirdLife International because it supports several bird species while they are breeding, overwintering or passing through on migration. Habitats in the IBA include fens, mires, springs and raised bogs, as well as tundra, the coast and neritic waters. The birds for which the IBA was designated include long-tailed ducks, common eiders, Steller's eiders, common scoters, yellow-billed loons, ruddy turnstones, Temminck's stints, little stints, red-necked phalaropes, black-legged kittiwakes, Arctic jaegers, pomarine jaegers, razorbills, red-throated pipits, Lapland longspurs and snow buntings.
