= Slettnes Lighthouse =

Coastal lighthouse in Norway

Slettnes Lighthouse Slettnes fyr Nordkapp
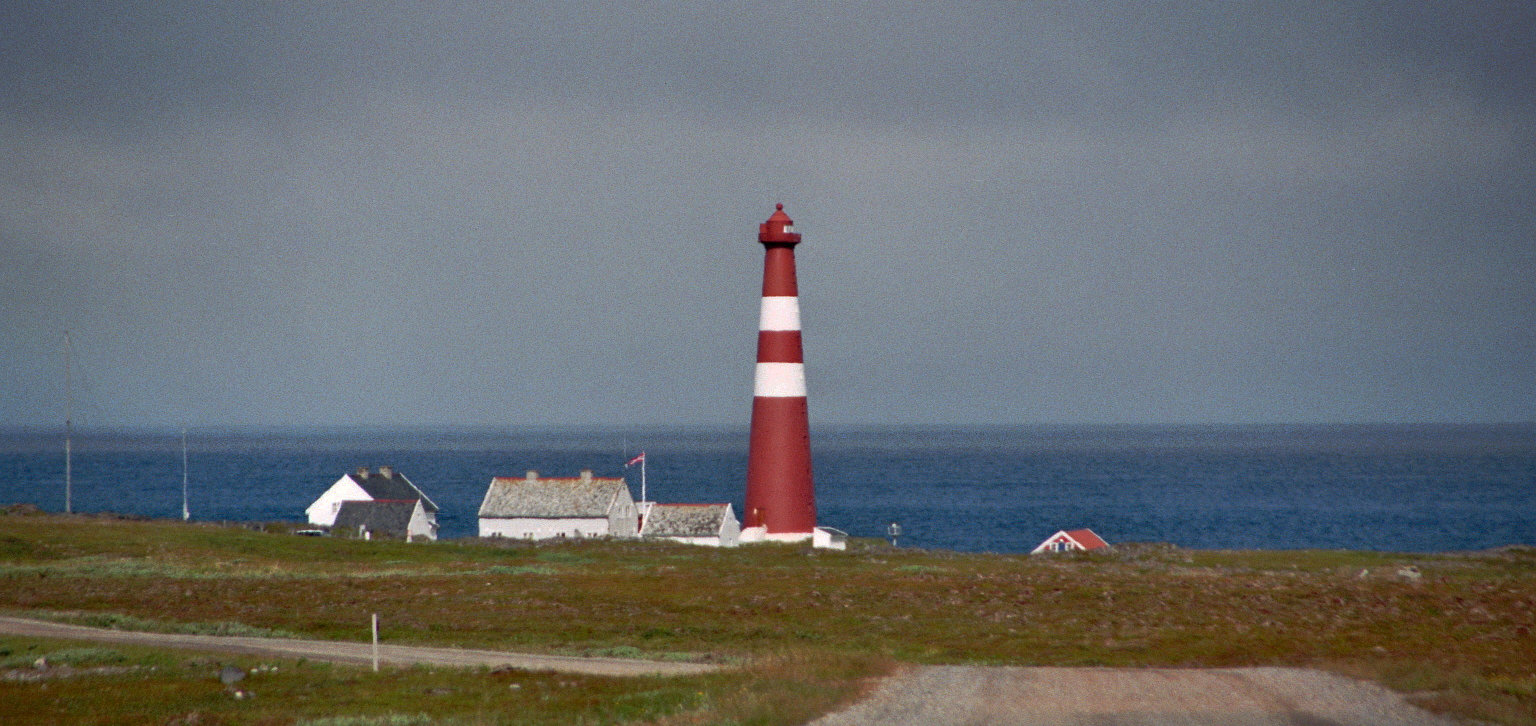
- View of the lighthouse
- Location of the lighthouse
- Location: Gamvik Municipality; Finnmark; Norway
- Coordinates: 71°05′22.6″N 28°13′06.2″E

Tower
- Constructed: 1905
- Foundation: concrete base
- Construction: cast iron tower
- Automated: 2005
- Height: 39 metres (128 ft)
- Shape: cylindrical tower with balcony and lantern
- Markings: red tower with 2 white bands
- Heritage: cultural heritage preservation in Norway
- Racon: T

Light
- First lit: 15 Sept 1905
- Focal height: 44 metres (144 ft)
- Intensity: 1,706,000 candela
- Range: 17.6 nmi (32.6 km; 20.3 mi)
- Characteristic: Fl W 20s.
- Norway no.: 956500

Slettnes Lighthouse (Norwegian: Slettnes fyr) is the northernmost mainland lighthouse on Earth. It is located in Gamvik Municipality in Finnmark county, Norway. It sits along the Barents Sea approximately 3 kilometres (1.9 mi) north of the village of Gamvik on the northern coast of the Nordkinn Peninsula, within the Slettnes Nature Reserve. The 39-metre (128 ft) lighthouse is the only cast iron lighthouse in Finnmark county.

This is the easternmost of the three Nordkapp area lighthouses, and it is often considered the North Cape Light, marking the "top" of Europe. Fruholmen Lighthouse is located about 500 metres (0.31 mi) farther north, on the island of Ingøya, but the Slettnes Lighthouse is the northernmost lighthouse on the mainland of Scandinavia.

== History ==
This lighthouse was built from 1903 to 1905. The round cast iron tower is 39 metres (128 ft) tall and it is painted red with two white horizontal bands. The light on top emits one long (2.5 sec) white flash every 20 seconds. The light burns from 12 August until 24 April each year. It doesn't burn during the summer due to the midnight sun. In 1922 the lighthouse got a foghorn with a siren, which gave a signal every thirty seconds, helping in fog and bad visibility. The foghorn could be heard in form of a one to two tone signal with a range of 6 nautical miles (11 km; 6.9 mi). The fog horn was in use until 1985.

The lighthouse was heavily damaged during World War II by German troops, but it was painstakingly restored after the war. The restored station was designed by architects Blakstad and Munthe-Kaas and it was completed in 1948. The station is owned by the Kystverket and managed by Gamvik Municipality as a tourist center, and overnight accommodations are available in the station buildings. In 1998, the lighthouse was listed as a heritage site. The lighthouse was automated in 2005.

== Climate ==
It has a tundra climate (Köppen: ET) bordering on subarctic (Köppen: Dfc).

Climate data for Slettnes Lighthouse 1991-2020 (8 m)
Month	Jan	Feb	Mar	Apr	May	Jun	Jul	Aug	Sep	Oct	Nov	Dec	Year
Record high °C (°F)	7.3 (45.1)	6.2 (43.2)	7.2 (45.0)	13.6 (56.5)	19.8 (67.6)	24.0 (75.2)	31.4 (88.5)	30.3 (86.5)	22.2 (72.0)	16.0 (60.8)	9.5 (49.1)	7.6 (45.7)	31.4 (88.5)
Mean daily maximum °C (°F)	−0.6 (30.9)	−1.2 (29.8)	−0.2 (31.6)	2.1 (35.8)	5.9 (42.6)	8.8 (47.8)	12.0 (53.6)	12.1 (53.8)	9.7 (49.5)	5.2 (41.4)	2.1 (35.8)	0.7 (33.3)	4.7 (40.5)
Daily mean °C (°F)	−3.2 (26.2)	−3.6 (25.5)	−2.3 (27.9)	0.2 (32.4)	3.8 (38.8)	6.7 (44.1)	9.6 (49.3)	9.9 (49.8)	7.7 (45.9)	3.4 (38.1)	0.0 (32.0)	−1.6 (29.1)	2.6 (36.7)
Mean daily minimum °C (°F)	−5.9 (21.4)	−6.4 (20.5)	−4.8 (23.4)	−1.9 (28.6)	1.8 (35.2)	5.0 (41.0)	7.8 (46.0)	8.0 (46.4)	5.7 (42.3)	1.3 (34.3)	−2.3 (27.9)	−4.2 (24.4)	0.3 (32.5)
Record low °C (°F)	−20.9 (−5.6)	−19.8 (−3.6)	−16.7 (1.9)	−12.8 (9.0)	−7.1 (19.2)	−2.8 (27.0)	3.6 (38.5)	2.3 (36.1)	−1.6 (29.1)	−9.5 (14.9)	−13.5 (7.7)	−16.8 (1.8)	−20.9 (−5.6)
Average precipitation mm (inches)	53.3 (2.10)	51.9 (2.04)	48.5 (1.91)	34.9 (1.37)	32.7 (1.29)	44.8 (1.76)	45.9 (1.81)	55.2 (2.17)	59.1 (2.33)	68.1 (2.68)	50.3 (1.98)	48.7 (1.92)	593.5 (23.37)
Average precipitation days (≥ 1 mm)	14.2	12.6	12.5	9.6	10.1	9.0	8.8	10.1	13.1	16.6	12.8	12.5	141.9
Source: Norwegian Meteorological Institute (precipitation 1991-2005)

== Gallery ==
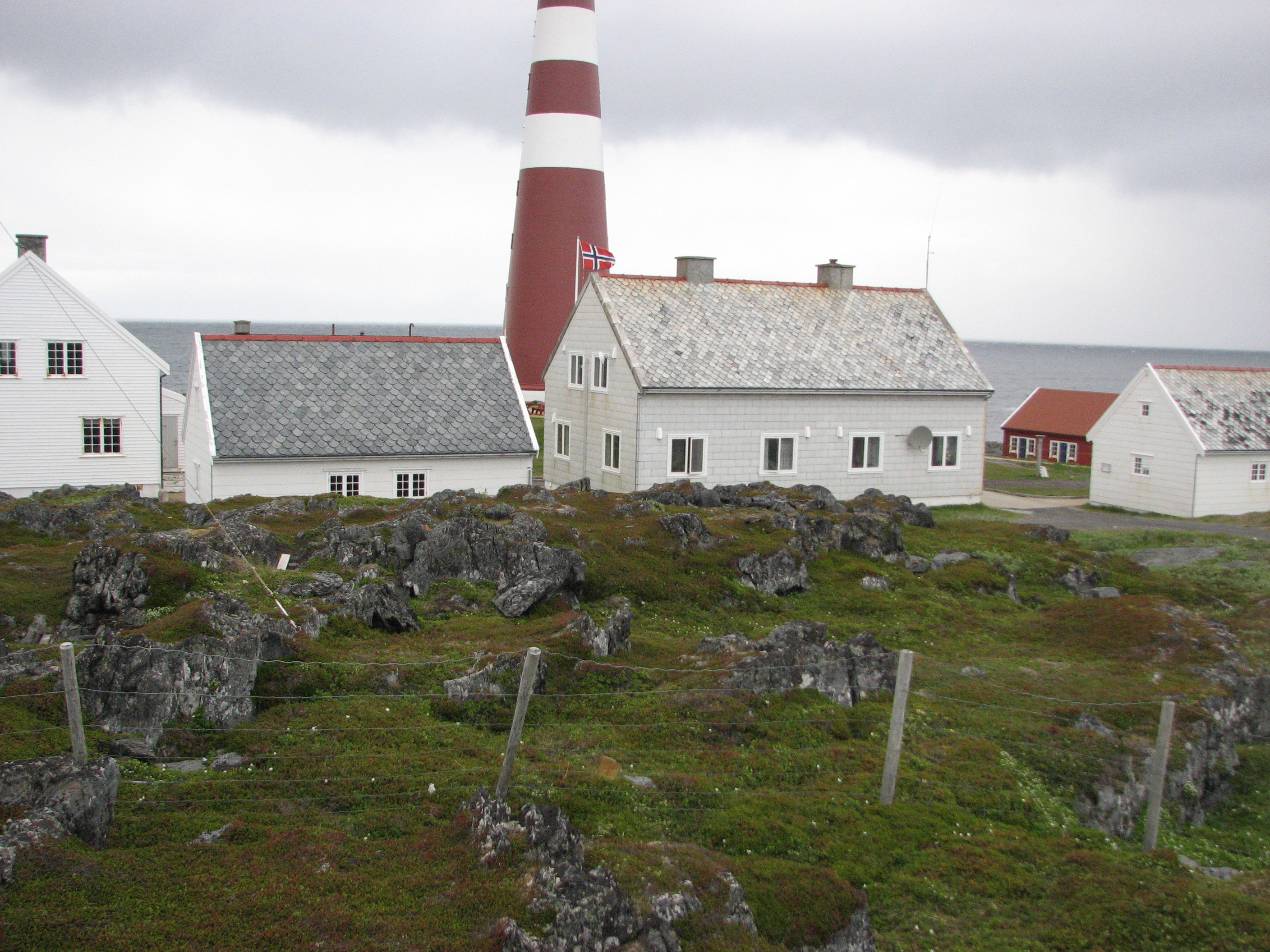
Slettnes lighthouse

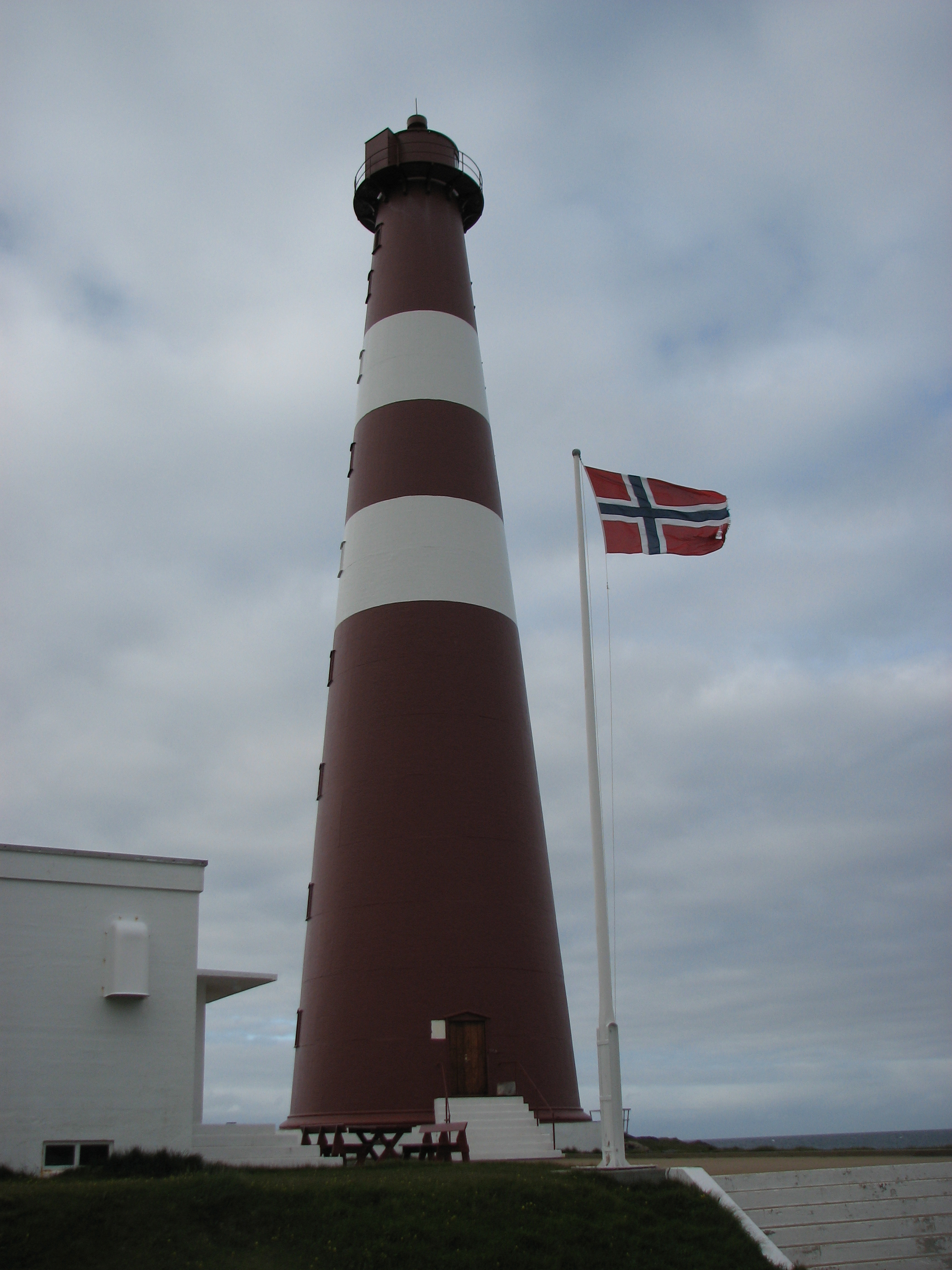
Slettnes lighthouse

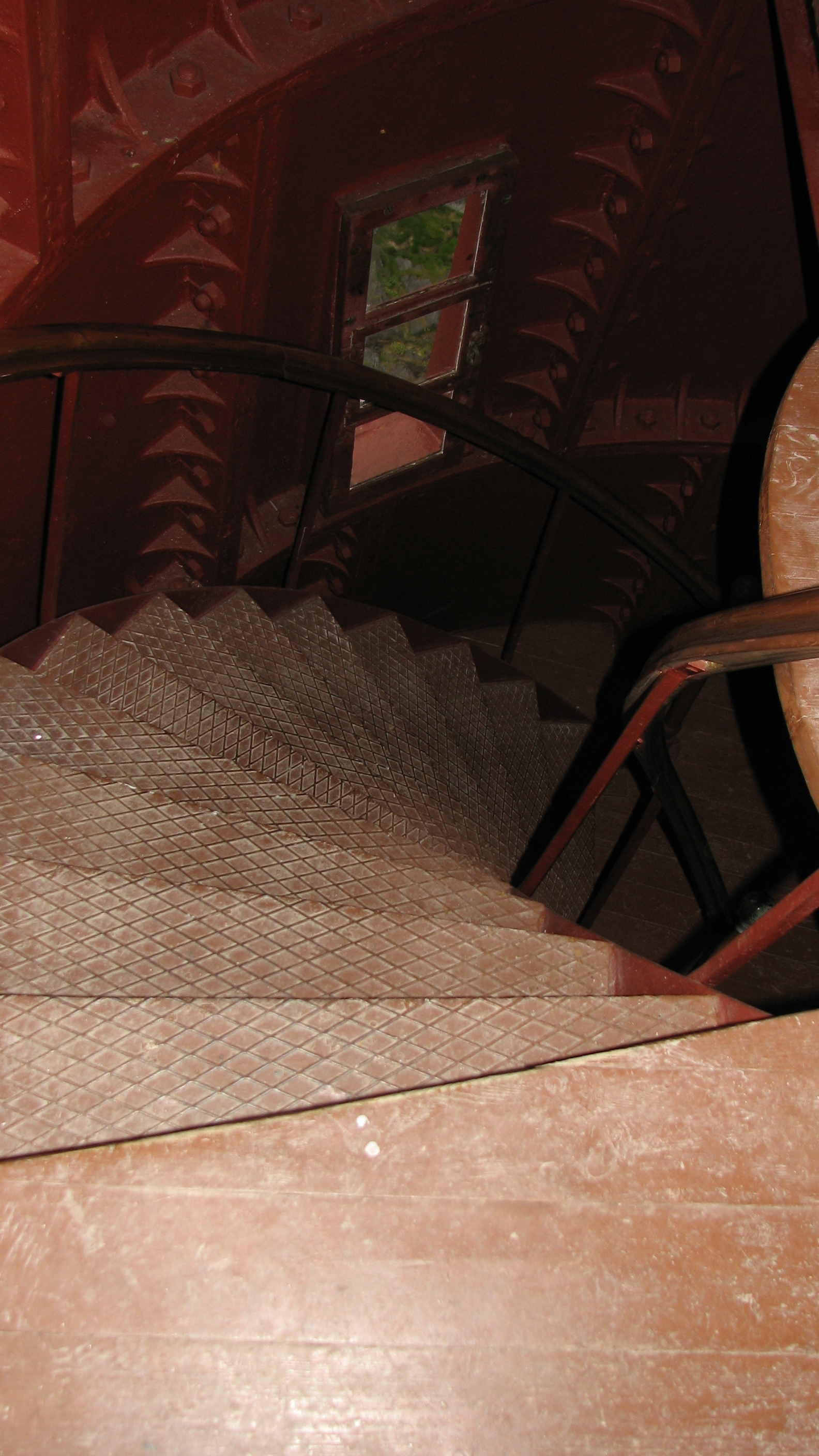
Slettnes lighthouse, stairs

== See also ==
- List of lighthouses in Norway
- Lighthouses in Norway
