= 2023 Asia heat wave =

Weather event in Asia

Meteorological history
- Date: April 2023
- Heat event

Overall effects
- Casualties: Hospitalizations: 450–460 (India); 5 (Malaysia); 2 (Philippines); at least 2 (Vietnam)
- Fatalities: 1651 (Japan); 179 (India); 22 (Pakistan); 2 (Malaysia); 2 (Thailand)

Starting in April 2023, a record-breaking heat wave has affected many Asian countries, including India, Sri Lanka, Bangladesh, Cambodia, China, Laos, Thailand, Malaysia, Singapore and Vietnam. Several regional temperature records have been set. The heat wave has caused many deaths due to heat stroke and has prompted health warnings and power outages across multiple countries.

A May study by the World Weather Attribution found that the heat wave was made at least 30 times more likely by climate change in India and Bangladesh, and that climate change raised temperatures by at least 2 °C (3.6 °F) in many parts of Asia in April.

== West Asia ==
Iran had announced a nationwide shutdown due to heat but it has been said it was secretly because of electricity power shortage.

== South Asia ==
=== Bangladesh ===
In Dhaka, temperatures rose above 40 °C (104 °F) on 15 April, which resulted in road surfaces melting. Power cuts took place in parts of Bangladesh due to a surge in electricity demand caused by the heat wave. Cases of heat exhaustion and heat stroke have increased in the country due to the heat.

M. A. Rahim, a professor at Daffodil University in Dhaka, said that the heat wave was impacting the country's rice and fruit production, estimating that rice production could fall by up to 40%.

In early June, the maximum temperature rose to about 41 °C (106 °F). The heat wave caused primary schools to be closed, and frequent power cuts, with a fuel shortage resulting in the shutdown of several power plants. It has also affected the country's tea production.

=== India ===
Six cities in India's north and eastern regions recorded temperatures above 44 °C (111 °F), while New Delhi recorded 40.4 °C (104.7 °F) on 18 April.

The Ministry of Labour issued an advisory to all states and regions to provide workers with adequate drinking water, emergency ice packs and frequent breaks. Mamata Banerjee, the Chief Minister of West Bengal, closed all schools in the state between 17 and 22 April due to concerns about the heat. In the same week, schools were closed in Tripura and Odisha.

K. J. Ramesh, director general of meteorology at the Meteorological Department, said in May that some states had started implementing mitigation efforts, such as closing schools by 1 p.m., operating government offices at 7 a.m.–1 p.m. and advising youths and seniors to stay indoors at 11 a.m.–3 p.m.

Later in May, the Indian Meteorological Department issued a heat wave alert for seven southern and central states. Temperatures surpassed 45 °C (113 °F) in Uttar Pradesh, with some parts being hit by 12-hour blackouts. The blackouts sparked protests at power stations near Lucknow. On May 23 and 25, three cheetah cubs died in Kuno National Park and one was sent to be treated in a critical care facility. The cubs were the first to be born in India in over seven decades. The heat wave in India was believed to have weakened the cubs.

As of 19 June, 119 people in Uttar Pradesh and 47 people in Bihar had died due to heat-related illnesses. Around 400 people were hospitalised in Uttar Pradesh in the same time period.

==== Maharashtra deaths ====
On 16 April, 13 people died from heat stroke after attending the Maharashtra Bhushan award event in Kharghar, Navi Mumbai, and 50–60 people were hospitalised.

The incident happened at a government event where Union Home Minister Amit Shah presented social worker Appasaheb Dharmadhikari with the Maharashtra Bhushan award. The episode was brought on by extended physical effort and exposure to high temperatures. Despite the fact that the IMD had not issued any heat wave warnings on that particular day, doctors have linked the deaths to prolonged exposure to heat in open spaces and strenuous activity. Many people came from nearby districts as well, which would have made their situation worse. Outrage over the occurrence has led to political figures calling for the government to be held accountable for the fatalities.

Nana Patole, President of the Maharashtra Pradesh Congress Committee, has sought the resignations of the Chief Minister and Deputy Chief Minister and called for the administration to be held accountable. Uddhav Thackeray, the former chief minister of Maharashtra, and Ajit Pawar, the head of the NCP, went to the hospital to inspect the situation and criticise the organisation of the event. Concerns regarding the need for improved planning and procedures to stop similar catastrophes in the future have been raised in response to the tragedy.

=== Nepal ===
In June, temperatures in Nepal topped 40 °C (104 °F) for days, with cities such as Nepalgunj and Nawalpur reaching as high as 44 °C (111 °F). The heat forced the closures of some schools and colleges in the country for over a week. The country's meteorological department warned that the high temperatures would likely persist until mid-July.

=== Pakistan ===
Nine cities recorded temperatures greater than or equal to 40 °C (104 °F) on 23 April. On 21 May, Jacobabad reached 49 °C (120 °F).

=== Sri Lanka ===
On 17 April, Sri Lanka's Department of Meteorology warned that the temperature was expected to increase to "caution level" in the Eastern, North Central and North Western provinces and the Hambantota, Kilinochchi, Mannar, Monaragala, Mullaitivu and Vavuniya districts. As of 27 April, the temperature in the country was 39–40 °C (102–104 °F).

== Southeast Asia ==
Tieh-Yong Koh, an associate professor at the Singapore University of Social Sciences, said in May that the prolonged dryness across Cambodia, Laos, Myanmar, Thailand and Vietnam is due to suppressed rainfall during the previous winter. He noted, "Because dry soil heats up faster than moist soil, a hot anomaly naturally forms as spring arrives".

=== Cambodia ===
Cambodia has been affected by water shortages due to high water demand in Thailand. Cambodia's Ministry of Water Resources and Meteorology predicted that hot weather would continue until mid-May, with less rainfall than in 2022. It also said that weather patterns were being affected by El Niño, and the resulting heat would last until August.

In May, temperatures of 41.6 °C (106.9 °F) were recorded in Kratié and the Ponhea Kraek district, setting a new national May record.

=== Laos ===
In April, the Sainyabuli province reached 42.9 °C (109.2 °F) on 19 April in a new all-time record for the country.

On 6 May, Luang Prabang reached 43.5 °C (110.3 °F), surpassing the country's previous record, and Thakhek recorded 31.8 °C (89.2 °F) that night, making it the country's hottest night. Over the same weekend, Vientiane reached 42.5 °C (108.5 °F), breaking the city's all-time record.

=== Malaysia ===
In April, Malaysia's Meteorological Department issued heat wave alerts in several states. The highest temperature recorded was 38.4 °C (101.1 °F) in Negeri Sembilan. On 25 April, an 11-year-old boy and a 19-month-old toddler died of heat stroke and severe dehydration in Kelantan. At least five people required medical treatment due to the heat.

On 3 May, the Education Ministry announced that all outdoor activities in schools would be suspended due to the heat. Two days later, the national meteorological department said the country's heat wave was expected to last until June. Students have been permitted to wear casual clothing instead of school uniforms. On 16 May, Deputy Prime Minister Ahmad Zahid Hamidi said that there were no immediate plans to declare the heat wave an emergency, but the government would do so if necessary.

=== Myanmar ===
On 25 April, four weather stations in Myanmar recorded monthly high temperatures, with Theinzayet in the Mon State recording the highest temperature at 43 °C (109 °F). The next day, the city of Bago reached 42.2 °C (108.0 °F), matching a record previously reached in May 2020 and April 2019, according to weather historian Maximiliano Herrera.

On 7 May, the temperature rose to 46 °C (115 °F) in the Magway Region. Media reports said that there were 61 deaths due to heat-related problems, but Radio Free Asia was unable to verify the number.

=== Philippines ===
In the Philippines, temperatures reached up to 37 °C (99 °F), while the heat index rose to 48 °C (118 °F) in Butuan on 21 April – the highest in the country so far for 2023. A power cut at a secondary school resulted in nearly 150 students being affected by heat stroke; two students were rushed to a hospital. The Department of Education announced that from 24 April, schools would be able to move classes online at their discretion to avoid the heat. 839 schools switched to distance learning to prevent students from falling ill due to the extreme heat.

On 12 May, the heat index reached 50 °C (122 °F) in Legazpi, Albay. In the same month, schools in Quezon City were allowed to shorten their hours due to the extreme heat.

=== Singapore ===
Singapore reached 36.1 °C (97.0 °F) in Admiralty on 14 April, the highest temperature recorded in the country since the start of 2023. This was broken just under a month later, with the temperature reaching 36.2 °C (97.2 °F) in Choa Chu Kang on 12 May. On the following day, the temperature in Ang Mo Kio hit 37.0 °C (98.6 °F), tying the record set on 17 April 1983 at Tengah. Singapore also recorded its highest ever daily minimum temperature for the month of May – 29.7 °C (85.5 °F) in East Coast Park on 25 May. In general, May 2023 was the warmest May on record for Singapore, with the Changi climate station observing an average temperature of 29.5 °C (85.1 °F).

Several schools have begun relaxing their rules on school uniforms to help students deal with the heat. Singapore's Meteorological Service said earlier in May that the country was "not currently experiencing a heatwave" despite recently recording relatively high temperatures.

=== Thailand ===
In Thailand, the temperature rose to over 49 °C (120 °F) for the first time in its history according to Herrera, with the city of Tak reaching 45.4 °C (113.7 °F) on 15 April. Large portions of the country have had temperatures in the range of upper 30s to lower 40s degrees Celsius since March. According to ArabiaWeather, Thailand's previous all-time record was 45.5 °C (113.9 °F) in the Mae Hong Son province. Two deaths due to the heat wave were reported.

Thousands were forced to flee from Chiang Mai due to pollution caused by the annual burning in northern Thailand and Myanmar. Power outages have become common due to the high use of air conditioners and refrigeration. On 25 April, rain in Bangkok brought respite from the heat.

The Thai government has issued health warnings, with the health department warning about the risk of heat stroke. On 22 April, the government issued a warning for people to stay indoors. On 21 April, Thailand's national weather service said that the heat index hit a record of 54 °C (129 °F).

On 6 May, Bangkok reached 41 °C (106 °F), the highest recorded in the city. On the next day, there were reports of people fainting due to the extreme heat, including advance voters in the 2023 general election. This included 14 people at Ramkhamhaeng University and 3 at Chan Kasem Rajabhat University. In the same week, temperatures in the northern and central regions remained above 46 °C (115 °F), resulting in an increase in power demand.

A May study by the World Weather Attribution found that Thailand's record heat wave was exacerbated by high humidity and a large number of forest fires that occurred around the same time.

=== Vietnam ===
The Hòa Bình province recorded the highest temperature in 27 years for March in Kim Bôi district at 41.4 °C (106.5 °F).

On 6 May, the temperature in Hội Xuân, about 150 km south of Hanoi, reached 44.1 °C (111.4 °F), surpassing the country's previous record of 43.4 °C (110.1 °F) in 2019. Later, the temperature reached 44.2 °C (111.6 °F) in the Tương Dương district.

On 19 May, nationwide blackouts started rolling out across the country, with notices by Vietnam Electricity (EVN) saying the blackouts could continue until the end of the month and could last up to 7 hours in some areas. EVN warned that high temperatures could put pressure on the national power system due to a spike in electricity consumption and lower-than-normal water levels in some dams.

On 30 May, authorities in Hanoi started reducing the duration of public lighting to keep the power system running. On 1 June, Muong La reached 43.8 °C (110.8 °F), breaking the record for Vietnam's hottest June day.

== East Asia ==
=== China ===
The best known incident occurred on July 16 in Sanbu Township, Xinjiang, which set a new record of 52.2 °C (126.0 °F). Two days later, on July 18, John Kerry, the U.S. Special Presidential Envoy for Climate visited Beijing and mentioned the Sanbu weather to Li Qiang, the Premier of China.

On 18 April, temperatures rose as high as 42.4 °C (108.3 °F) in Yuanyang County, Yunnan. According to climatologist Jim Yang, over 100 weather stations broke their temperature record on 17 April. In multiple provinces, temperatures have exceeded 35 °C (95 °F). On 22–23 April, a cold front sweeping south and east triggered a significant drop in temperatures, torrential rain and heavy snowfall in parts of northern China, with Shanxi reporting up to 24 cm of snow.

On 6 May, the Changjiang Li Autonomous County in Hainan province reached 41.5 °C (106.7 °F), making it the highest temperature recorded in the province. In mid-May, Shandong province and Beijing issued heat warnings, with cities such as Jinan, Tianjin and Zhengzhou expecting temperatures to rise as high as 37 °C (99 °F). On 29 May, Shanghai recorded 36.7 °C (98.1 °F), the highest May temperature recorded in the city in 100 years. The previous record of 35.7 °C (96.3 °F) was reached in 1876, 1903, 1915 and 2018.

In June, temperatures across southern China reached at least 42.2 °C (108.0 °F). Hong Kong reached a new June record of 37.9 °C (100.2 °F). On 7 June, temperatures over 45 °C (113 °F) were recorded in the country. On 22 June, Beijing hit 41.1 °C (106.0 °F), which is the highest ever recorded temperature in June in the capital, breaking the June record of 40.6 °C (105.1 °F) set back in 1961, making this the 7th time the capital has exceeded 40 °C (104 °F). On the same day, Tianjin hit 41.4 °C (106.5 °F), which not only was its highest ever June temperature on record, but the all-time highest temperature ever recorded.

On 23 June, Beijing issued a "red" alert level, which advises people to avoid outdoor work and for children and elderly people to take precautions. As predicted, the capital hit 40.3 °C (104.5 °F), exceeding 40 °C for a second day in a row, which has never happened in the Chinese capital since reliable observations were kept since 1951. The same thing occurred in nearby Tianjin.

On 24 June, the red alert level was issued once again to all or part of Beijing, Tianjin, Hebei, Shandong, Henan and Inner Mongolia, with temperatures forecasted to hit at least 40 °C in 24 hours. As predicted, the capital and Tianjin once again hit 40 °C, which meant an unprecedented third day of 40 °C temperatures for both cities.

=== Japan ===
The temperature in Minamata, Kumamoto reached 30.2 °C (86.4 °F) in a new April record for the area. In June, the Japan Meteorological Agency said that Japan finished its warmest March to May period on record. Also, an average temperature nationwide in Japan, especially in Hokkaidō and northern Honshū on August, Sapporo, 26.7 °C (80.1 °F) on 2023 August, 22.3 °C (72.1 °F) an average on August, Hakodate, 26.5 °C (79.7 °F) and 22.1 °C (71.8 °F), Morioka, Iwate Prefecture, 27.9 °C (82.2 °F) and 23.5 °C (74.3 °F), Sakata, Yamagata Prefecture, 30.1 °C (86.2 °F) and 25.5 °C (77.9 °F), Niigata City, 30.6 °C (87.1 °F) and 26.5 °C (79.7 °F), other place, Kanazawa, 30.5 °C (86.9 °F) and 27.3 °C (81.1 °F), Kyoto City, 30.3 °C (86.5 °F) and 28.5 °C (83.3 °F), Hiroshima City, 30.0 °C (86.0 °F) and 28.5 °C (83.3 °F), Tokyo, 29.2 °C (84.6 °F) and 26.9 °C (80.4 °F), Kōriyama, Fukushima Prefecture, 27.3 °C (81.1 °F) and 24.5 °C (76.1 °F), according to Japan Meteorological Agency official confirmed report, JMA also report, above minimum 30.0 °C (86.0 °F) day's temperature recorded place on August 10, 31.4 °C (88.5 °F) in Itoigawa, 30.8 °C (87.4 °F) in Jōetsu, both Niigata Prefecture, 30.4 °C (86.7 °F) in Yonago and Matsue, both Sanin region, 30.1 °C (86.2 °F) in Matsuyama, Ehime Prefecture, and high day's temperature, 40.0 °C (104.0 °F) in Komatsu, Ishikawa Prefecture on same day, these places were highest temperature recorded, since first observation recorded on local observatory. JMA official reported, many place minimum daily temperature above 25.0 °C (77.0 °F) days from July to September, 59 days in Shimonoseki, 57 days in Hiroshima and Tokyo, 54 days in Kyoto, 52 days in Takamatsu, Shikoku Island, 50 days in Kanazawa, 48 days in Nagoya, 41 days in Kumamoto, Kyushu Island, 39 days in Yonago, 38 days in Niigata, 35 days in Sendai, Miyagi Prefecture.

On August 2nd 2022, the temperature in Nisshin, Aichi prefecture reached 41 degrees Celsius. According to Japan Ministry of Health, Labour and Welfare published a report issue on demographic survey on 17 September 2024, 1,651 persons were confirmed death by heatwave relative in nationwide from June to September, 2023.

== Central Asia ==
Unusual temperatures for April were recorded in several central Asian countries, including Kazakhstan, where the city of Taraz reached 33.6 °C (92.5 °F), as well as Turkmenistan, which reached 42.4 °C (108.3 °F), and Uzbekistan.

On 7 June, temperatures of 41 °C (106 °F) in Kazakhstan and 43 °C (109 °F) in Uzbekistan were recorded.

== North Asia ==
On 3 June, Jalturovosk in Siberia reached 37.9 °C (100.2 °F) in its hottest day in history. The next day, Alexandrovskoe and Laryak reached record high temperatures of 36.1 °C (97.0 °F) and 34.9 °C (94.8 °F) respectively. On 7 June, multiple all-time heat records were broken in Siberia, with Baevo reaching 39.6 °C (103.3 °F) and Barnaul reaching 38.5 °C (101.3 °F).

== Impact ==
=== Of climate change ===
Parts of Thailand and Vietnam have been affected by thick smog during the heat wave. Experts contacted by NBC News noted that the combination of extreme heat and air pollution could lead to an increase in respiratory, cardiovascular and kidney diseases, and these impacts would worsen due to climate change intensifying heat waves and air pollution.

A May study by the World Weather Attribution found that the heat wave was made at least 30 times more likely by climate change in India and Bangladesh, and that climate change raised temperatures by at least 2 °C (3.6 °F) in many parts of Asia in April.

Archana Shrestha, the deputy director general of Nepal's Meteorological Forecasting Division, said that "we can't deny the impact of climate change and global warming when we look at the various climatic patterns." Anil Pokharel, the CEO of Nepal's National Disaster Risk Reduction Management Authority (NDRRMA), said, "If we look at the pattern, the heat waves have become more and more severe and frequent in recent years and decades. Though this is primarily a climate change-induced trend, we humans and our behaviors, lifestyles and policies are equally responsible."

An analysis conducted using the Climate Shift Index (CSI), a metric developed by Climate Central, found that climate change at least doubled the chances of the June heat wave in Uttar Pradesh, India.

=== Fossil fuel consumption ===
In India, Karnataka's three coal power plants, which previously had reduced demand, were set to run at full capacity in April to meet the increased electricity demand caused by the heat wave.

Many Asian countries have been forced to rely on coal to keep up with the energy demands caused by the heat wave, due to the European boycott of Russian oil during the Russian invasion of Ukraine reducing the availability of liquefied natural gas (LNG) in Asia. Bloomberg News reported that Russia exported 7.6 million metric tonnes of coal to Asia in April, with India and China buying over two-thirds.

== See also ==
- 2023 heat waves
