= Villamanta =

Coordinates: 40°18′N 4°07′W

- Municipality
- Flag Coat of arms

- Municipal location within the Community of Madrid.
- Country: Spain
- Autonomous community: Community of Madrid

Area
  - Total: 24.38 sq mi (63.15 km^{2})
- Elevation: 1,831 ft (558 m)

Population (2025-01-01)
  - Total: 2,899
  - Density: 118.9/sq mi (45.91/km^{2})
- Time zone: UTC+1 (CET)
  - Summer (DST): UTC+2 (CEST)

Villamanta is a municipality of the Community of Madrid, Spain. In 2022 it had a population of 2714.
