= Nervei =

Nervei: Nervei (Norwegian); Njereveadji (Northern Sami)
- Village
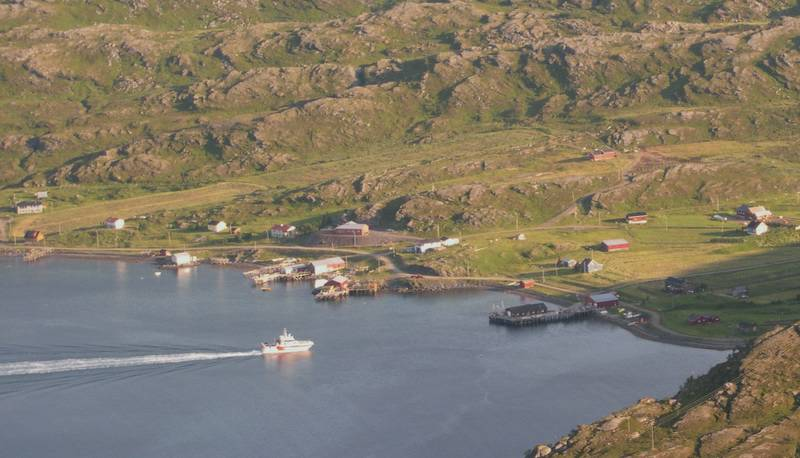
- View of the village
- Interactive map of Nervei
- Location within Finnmark Location within Norway
- Coordinates: 70°39′55″N 27°51′17″E
- Country: Norway
- Region: Northern Norway
- County: Finnmark
- District: Øst-Finnmark
- Municipality: Gamvik Municipality
- Elevation: 7 m (23 ft)
- Time zone: UTC+01:00 (CET)
  - Summer (DST): UTC+02:00 (CEST)
- Post Code: 9773 Nervei

Nervei (Norwegian) or Njereveadji (Northern Sami) is a small Sami village in the Gamvik Municipality in Finnmark county, Norway. It is located along the shore of Langfjorden, an arm of Tanafjorden in Eastern Finnmark. The nearby village of Laggo is located to the south.

The main industries in Nervei are sea harvesting and farming. The main exports are cod, dried fish, king crabs, sheep, and products from mohair wool.

There is no official road going to the village yet, so commuting is done by boat from Skjånes or Smalfjord. The residents have been trying to get a road connection for many years, and some work has begun on building a road from Rv. 888 at Reinoksevannet to Nervei. Currently, the dirt-gravel road is open during most of the year when the weather is good, but the road is not high quality.

== Media gallery ==
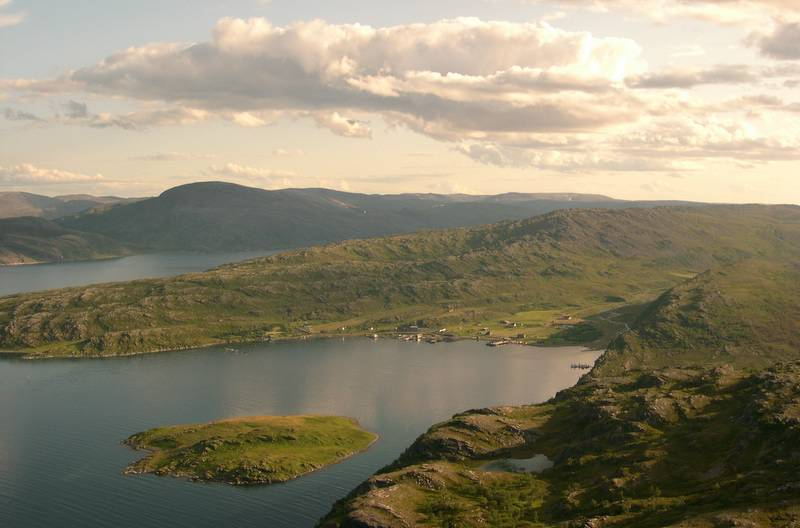
View of the Nervei area

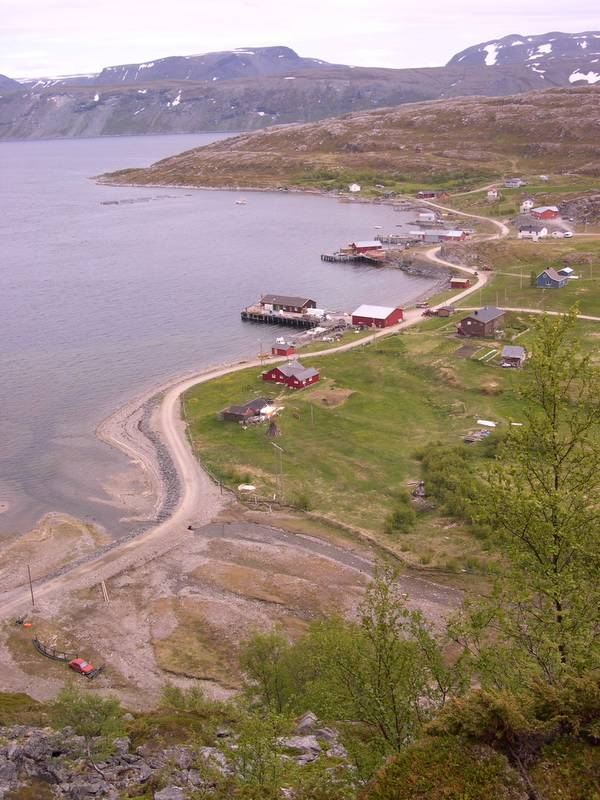
Shoreline of Nervei

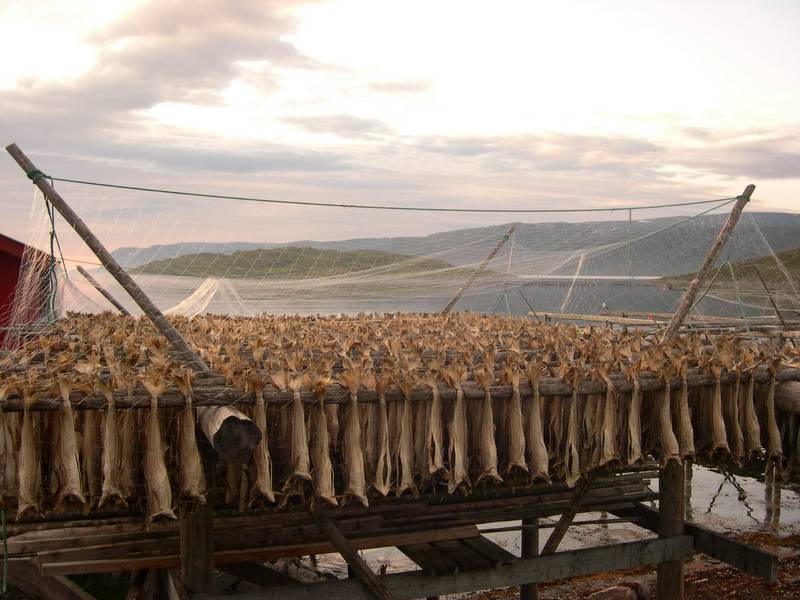
Drying fish, near the shore in Nervei
