= Hop Church =

- Hop kirke
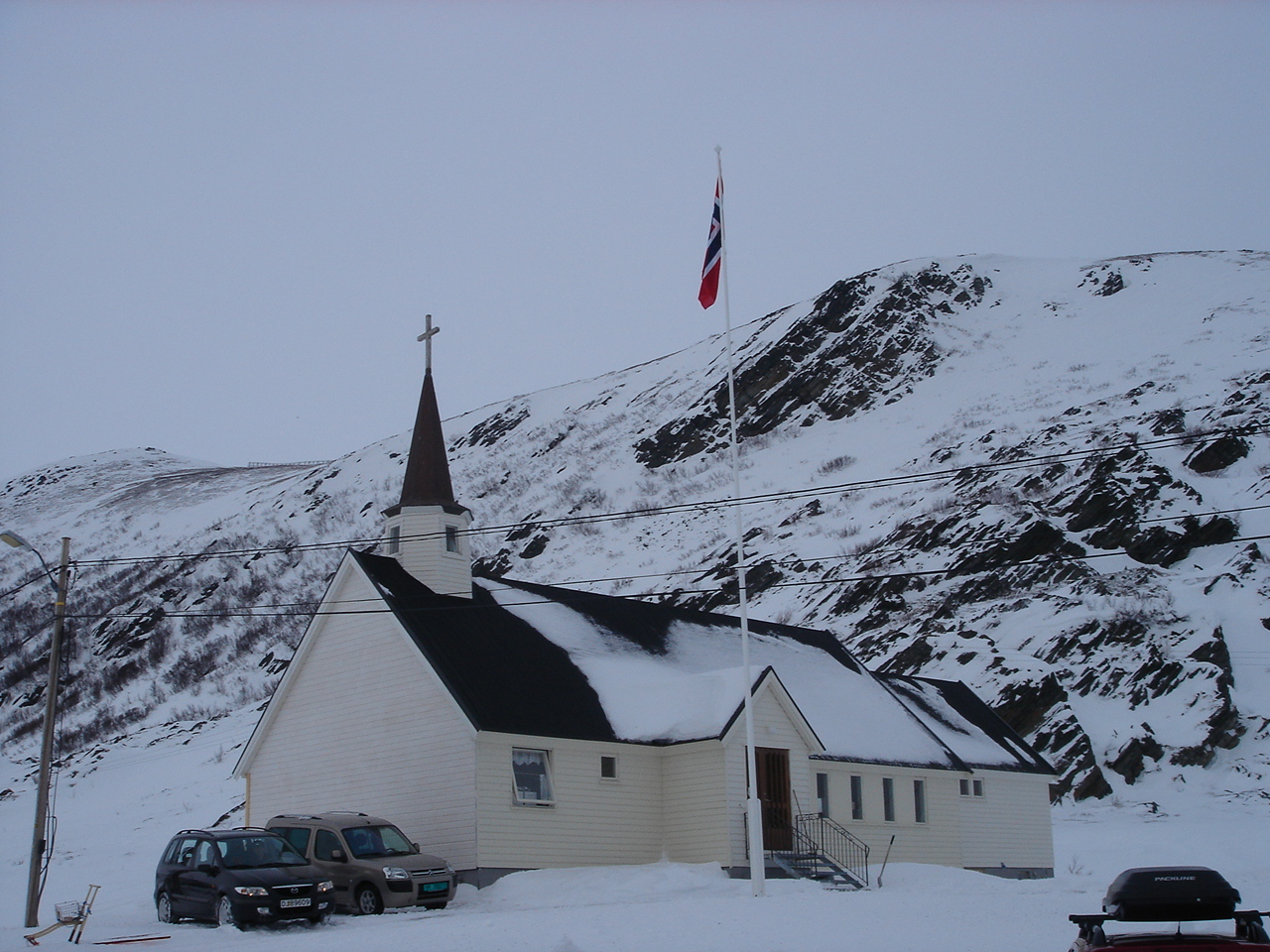
- View of the church
- Hop Church
- 70.798385°N 28.113371°E
- Location: Gamvik Municipality, Finnmark
- Country: Norway
- Denomination: Church of Norway
- Churchmanship: Evangelical Lutheran

History
- Status: Chapel
- Consecrated: 1977

Architecture
- Functional status: Active
- Completed: 1977 (49 years ago)

Specifications
- Materials: Wood

Administration
- Diocese: Nord-Hålogaland
- Deanery: Hammerfest prosti
- Parish: Gamvik

Hop Church (Norwegian: Hop kirke) is a chapel of the Church of Norway in Gamvik Municipality in Finnmark county, Norway. It is located in the village of Skjånes. It is an annex chapel for the Gamvik parish which is part of the Hammerfest prosti (deanery) in the Diocese of Nord-Hålogaland. The white, wooden church was built in 1977 to serve the southern part of the municipality. The chapel is built on what is believed to be the site of a medieval church that was closed before the 1600s.

== See also ==
- List of churches in Nord-Hålogaland
