= Skjånes =

Skjånes (Norwegian); Skeavvonjárga (Northern Sami)
- Village
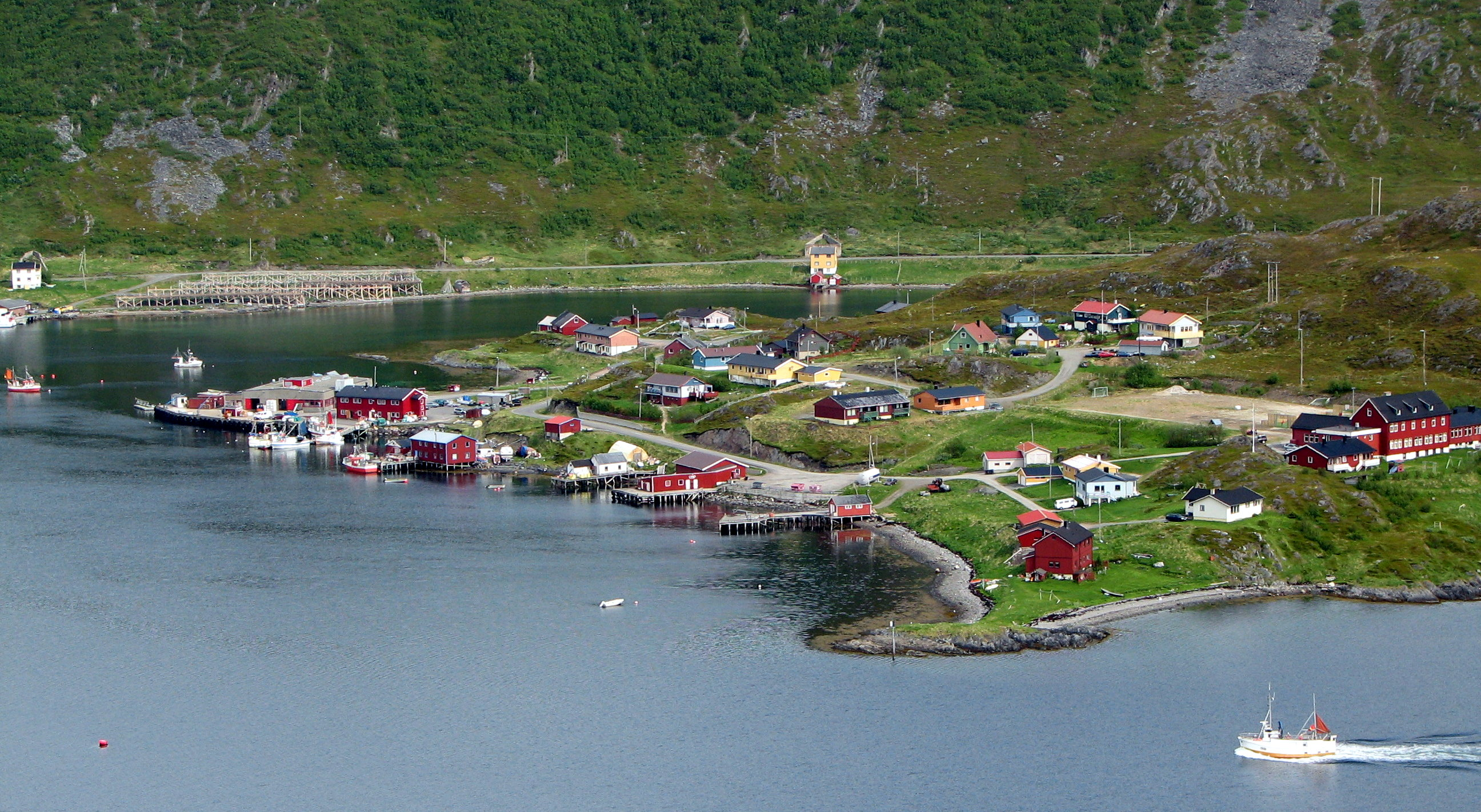
- View of the village
- Interactive map of: Skjånes (Norwegian); Skeavvonjárga (Northern Sami)
- Location within Finnmark Location within Norway
- Coordinates: 70°48′01″N 28°05′54″E
- Country: Norway
- Region: Northern Norway
- County: Finnmark
- District: Øst-Finnmark
- Municipality: Gamvik Municipality
- Elevation: 9 m (30 ft)
- Time zone: UTC+01:00 (CET)
  - Summer (DST): UTC+02:00 (CEST)
- Post Code: 9771 Skjånes

Skjånes (Northern Sami: Skeavvonjárga) is a small village in Gamvik Municipality in Finnmark county, Norway. The village is located on the shores of the Hopsfjorden, an arm that branches off the main Tanafjorden. The small village lies on the Nordkinn Peninsula, a 45-kilometre (28 mi) long drive southeast of the village of Mehamn. The 60-70 residents work mostly in the fishing industry. Hop Church is located in this village, serving the southern part of the municipality.

== Media gallery ==
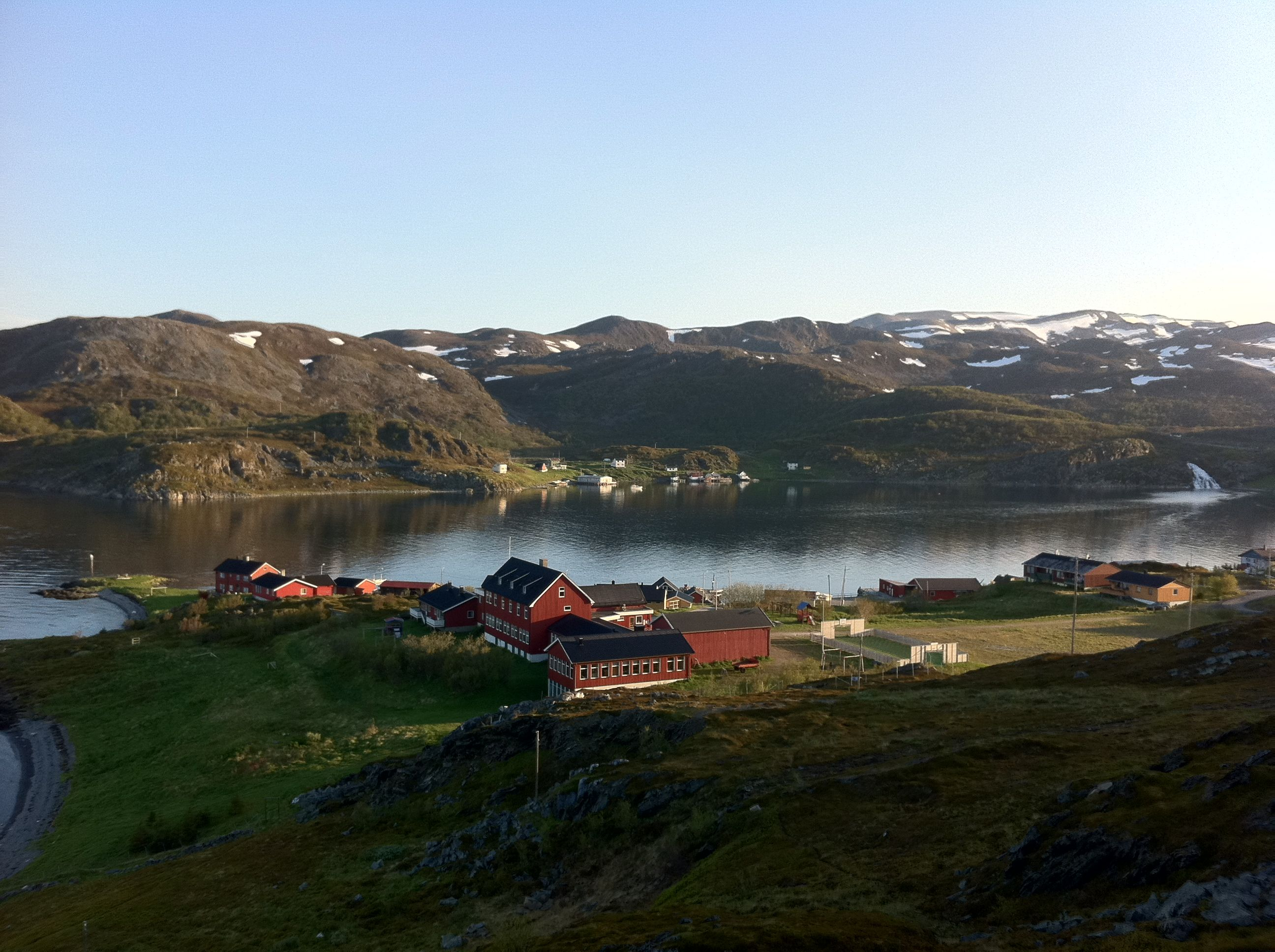
View of Skjånes, showing the old school

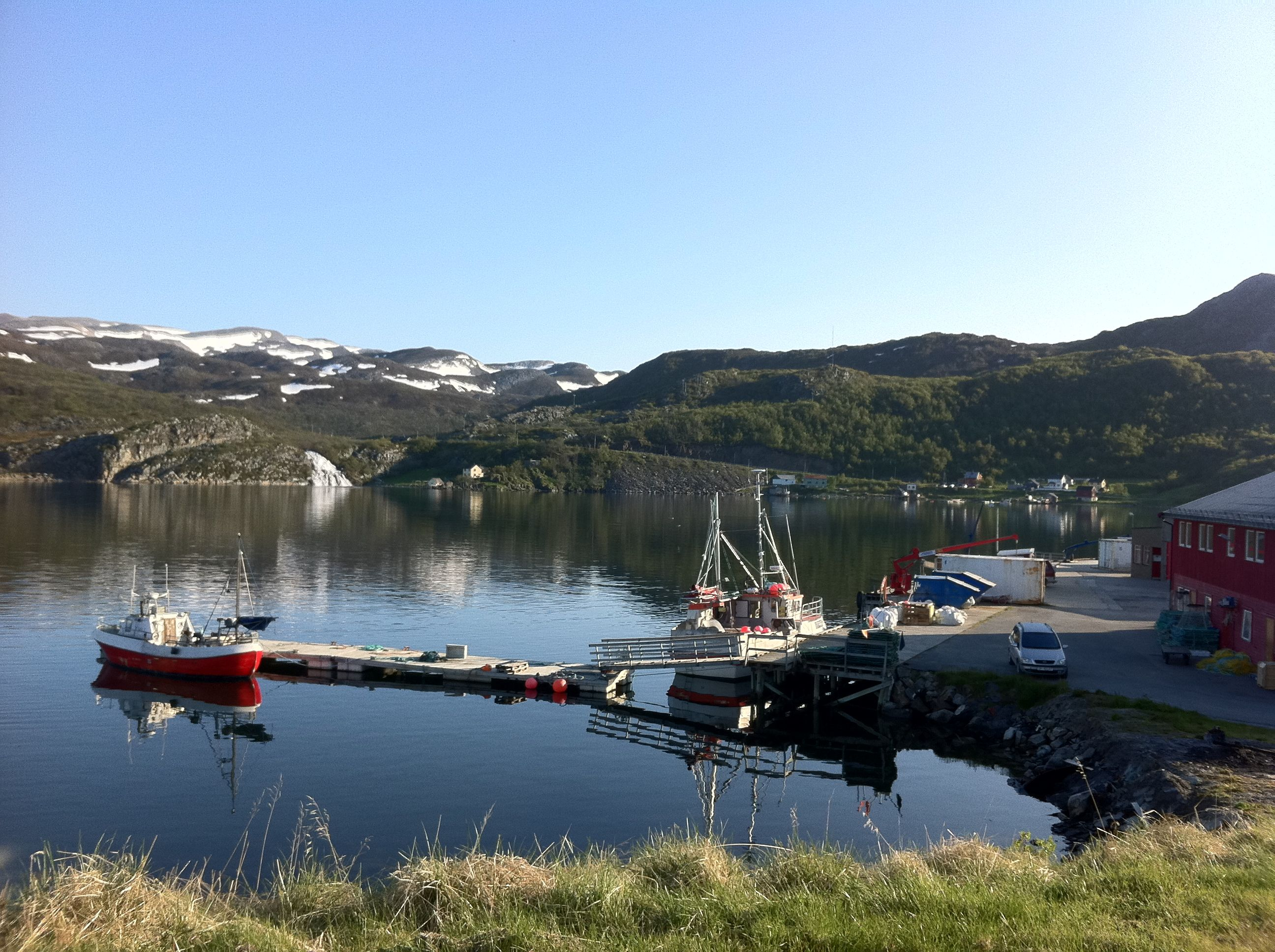
View of the Skjånes harbor

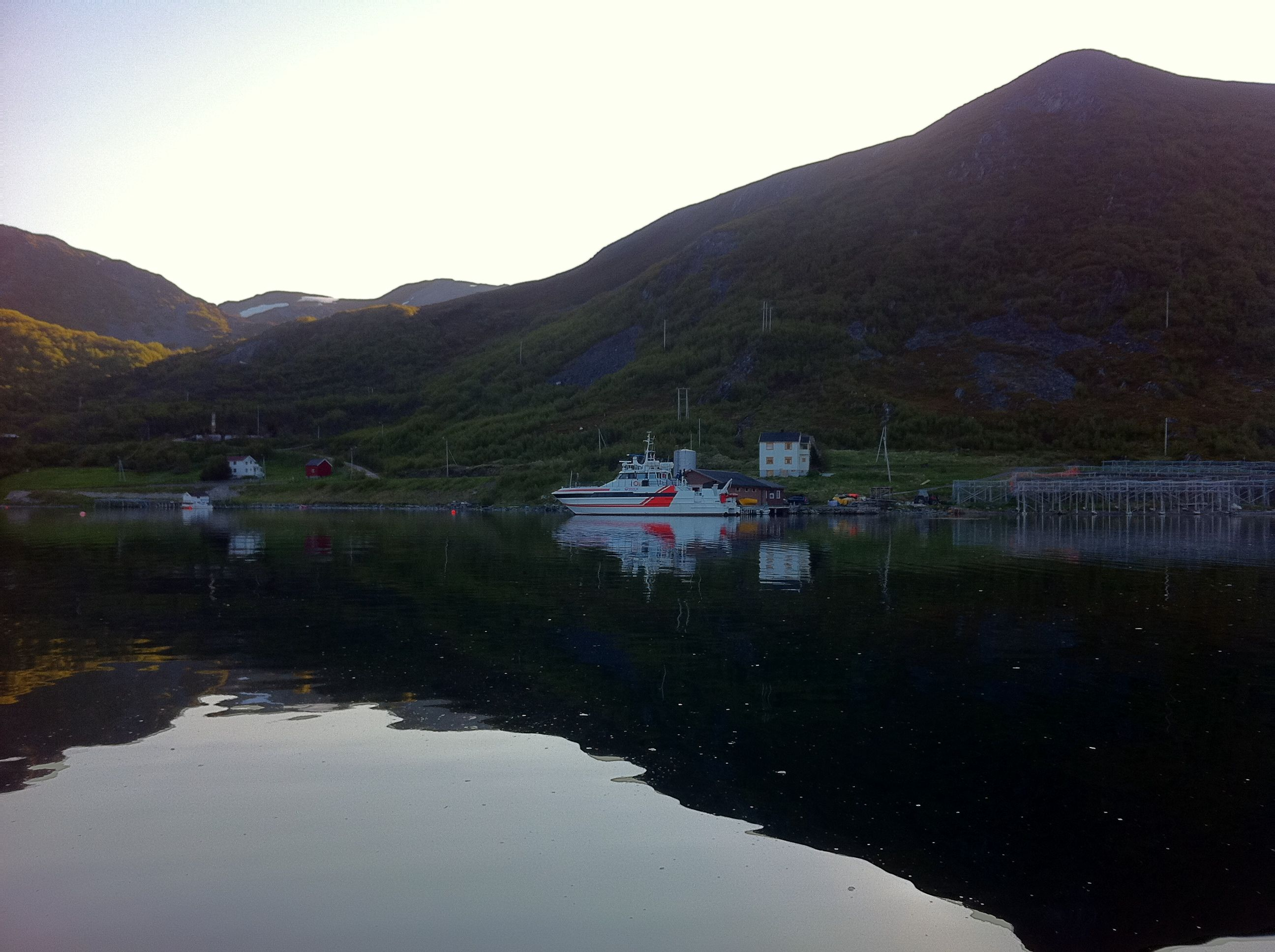
View of the ferry stopping at Skjånes
