= Værøy =

Værøy may refer to:

== Places ==
- Værøy Municipality, a municipality in the Lofoten district of Nordland county, Norway
- Værøya, an island within Værøy Municipality in the Lofoten district of Nordland county, Norway
- Værøy Lighthouse, a coastal lighthouse in Værøy Municipality in the Lofoten district of Nordland county, Norway
- Værøy Church, a church in Værøy Municipality in the Lofoten district of Nordland county, Norway
- Old Værøy Church, a historic church in Værøy Municipality in the Lofoten district of Nordland county, Norway

== Transportation ==
- Værøy Airport, a former regional airport in Værøy Municipality in the Lofoten district of Nordland county, Norway
- Værøy Heliport, a regional heliport in Værøy Municipality in the Lofoten district of Nordland county, Norway

== Other ==
- Værøy accident, an airplane accident in Værøy Municipality in the Lofoten district of Nordland county, Norway
