= Offshore Helicopters =

Norwegian airline, 1974–1980

- Founded: 1974
- Ceased operations: 1980
- Operating bases: Bergen Airport, Flesland; Stavanger Airport, Sola; Bodø Airport
- Fleet size: 8
- Parent company: Fred. Olsen Airtransport
- Headquarters: Bergen, Norway

Offshore Helicopters A/S was an offshore and scheduled helicopter airline based at Bergen Airport, Flesland in Bergen, Norway. Established in 1974, the company lasted until 1980 when it merged with its main competitor, Helikopter Service. Offshore Helicopters flew mostly to Statfjord, and had at its peak eight helicopters. It flew a scheduled service from Bodø to Værøy between 1976 and 1979.

== History ==
Through the late 1960s and early 1970s there was a boom in offshore oil exploration and later production. This led to a steady increase in offshore helicopter traffic, although initially only Helikopter Service was able to capture it. Three significant airlines therefore went together to form a challenger. Offshore Helicopters was incorporated by Fred. Olsen Airtransport, Helitourist and Mørefly on 31 October 1974. Its head office was located at Bergen Airport, Flesland, with a second base at Stavanger Airport, Sola. The airline received an offshore operating concession the same year. The Managing Director was Peter Lynge Nissen, Flight Commander was Asbjørn Sætherbakken, Operational Manager and Flight Assistant was Svein Visdal.and Finance Manager was Arnfinn Fedje.

The airline initially bought two fifteen-passenger Aérospatiale SA 330 Puma. There was a desire both among politicians and oil companies that there be created a challenger to Helikopter Service, but it proved difficult for Offshore Helicopters to secure significant contracts. Their main operations was a joint contract with Helikopter Service to fly to and from the construction of Statfjord A which opened in November 1979. When capasity was available, they carried out assignments with the Pumas and Bells in connection with water power developments in Modalen and Jondalen. The operation in the North Sea involved an extensive cooperation with the larger company, and forcing Offshore Helicopters to sell their Super Pumas and instead buy two Sikorsky S-61N and two Bell 212 in order to unify the fleets. All maintenance of the Sikorskys were done by Helikopter Service, although Offshore Helicopters maintained their Bells. By 1978 the fleet had increased to four helicopters of each class.

The airline operated a scheduled passenger service between 1976 and 1979, between Bodø Airport and the island of Værøya. The route was subsidized by the government and awarded to Widerøe, who also operated the rest of the subsidized regional network. Widerøe bought a Sikorsky S-58T, but subcontracted the operations to Offshore Helicopter. The company took over an old hangar at Bodø and had four people stationed there.

Mørefly and Helitourist eventually sold their shares to Fred. Olsen. In 1980 they have up operating the airline, and agreed to a merger with Helikopter Service. Fred. Olsen was paid in shares in the merged Helikopter Service, receiving an ownership share of fifteen percent.

== Bibliography ==
- Olsen-Hagen, Bernt Charles (2014). Offshore Helicopters: Helikopteraktiviteten på norsk kontinentalsokkel (in Norwegian). Aviation Forlag. ISBN 978-82-999547-0-9.
