= Værøy Heliport =

Heliport on the island of Værøya, Norway

Værøy Heliport Værøy helikopterhavn
- IATA: none; ICAO: ENVR

Summary
- Airport type: Public
- Operator: Avinor
- Serves: Værøy, Norway
- Location: Tobbisodden, Sørland, Værøy
- Elevation AMSL: 5 m / 15 ft
- Coordinates: 67°39′16″N 12°43′37″E

Map

Helipads
| Number | Length | | Surface |
| Number | m | ft | Surface |
|---|---|---|---|
| 03/21 | 56 | 184 | Asphalt |

Statistics (2014)
- Passengers: 9,420
- Aircraft movements: 1,252
- Cargo (tonnes): 27

Værøy Heliport (Norwegian: Værøy helikopterhavn; ICAO: ENVR) is a heliport located at Tobbisodden on the island of Værøya in Værøy Municipality in Nordland county, Norway. The heliport lies close to the village of Sørland, the municipal centre of the municipality. The airport, operated by the state-owned Avinor, consists of a single helipad and handled 9,420 passengers in 2014. Services are provided by Lufttransport using the AgustaWestland AW139 to the nearby mainland town of Bodø, based on a public service obligation contract.

Widerøe commenced seaplane operates to Værøy from 1965; five years later the first helicopter services were introduced. Planning of an airport started in the late 1960s, and Værøy Airport opened in 1986. The fatal Widerøe Flight 839 accident took place on 12 April 1990, causing the airport to be closed. Helicopter services commenced in 1993 and Værøy Heliport opened in 1997, after several locations had been considered. Services were originally operated by Helikopter Service; Lufttransport has won every tender since 2005.

== History ==
=== Seaplanes and helicopters ===
The first aircraft to land on the island of Værøya was a Noorduyn Norseman of the Royal Norwegian Air Force in 1948. Services to Værøy started in 1965, when Widerøe commenced sea plane services to the island using de Havilland Canada DHC-3 Otters and Norseman aircraft. The routes were operated two to three times per week as a charter service, with subsidies from the municipalities of Værøy and Røst. At Værøy the airline parked the aircraft in Sørlandsvågen and rowed passengers to and from land with a rowboat. Ragnar Johansen's Cessna was a frequent operator to Værøy for charter services.

Helikopter Service flew between Bodø Airport to Værøyf and Røst—the island community further out from Værøy—with three weekly services from 1973. The helicopters doubled as serving for search and rescue duty; in case they were needed for the latter flights to Værøy and Røst were cancelled. The regional airports in Lofoten and Vesterålen opened in 1972, with the Værøy and Røst service being taken over by Widerøe on 1 September 1973. As they did not want to operate helicopters, they subcontracted the operations to Helilift. The service operated twice per day on weekdays and once per day in the weekends, using two sixteen-seat Sikorsky S-58Ts. Subsidies of 1.9 million Norwegian krone (NOK) was granted for the route in 1973, and the service transported 5,359 passengers (from both Røst and Værøy). At Værøy the helicopters landed at Hanna Bakken-jordet in Sørland.

One of the helicopters was bought by Widerøe in December 1976 and the operations were subcontracted to Offshore Helicopters. The second Sikorsky was bought from Helilift in March 1978 and also operated by Offshore Helicopters. Helikopter Service merged with Offshore Helicopters in 1980, and the new Helikopter Service took over the route. They introduced an eleven-seat Bell 212 helicopters from 1 January 1982 because of the high maintenance costs of the S-58Ts. In 1982 the service to both islands handled 7,145 passengers and three tonnes of post and cargo, and made 744 landings. It received subsidies for NOK 4 million.

=== Airport and accident ===
Proposals for an airport at Værøy and Røst were launched in the late 1960s. Three locations on Værøy were considered: Kvalnes, Røssnesvågen and Nordlandet. The Norwegian Meteorological Institute concluded in 1973 that Nordlandet was the most suitable location in terms of weather, but test flights showed otherwise. The local population was largely content with the helicopter service, but pressure from Røst resulted in a local acceptance for an airport. Construction began in 1985. and Værøy and Røst Airports opened on 1 June 1986. The airport is located at Nordlandet on the north side of the island of Værøy. It is located on level section of land; just south of the runway is the 465-meter (1,526 ft) tall mountain Teisthammeren. The asphalt runway measured 800 by 30 meters (2,625 by 98 ft).

On 19 January 1989, Widerøe Flight 836, a Twin Otter became uncontrollable due to turbulence during final approach to Værøy. Control was regained when there was 80 meters (260 ft) height above the sea. This incident caused the airport to be temporarily closed. Widerøe Flight 839 took place on 12 April 1990, when a Twin Otter crashed into the sea just after take-off, killing all five people on board. The cause of the accident were strong winds that exceeded the structure's tolerance, causing the tail rudder and tailplane to crack so the plane became uncontrollable. Uneven and strong winds had given the airport low regularity, and prior to take-off, wind speeds of 57 knots (106 km/h; 66 mph; 29 m/s) had been recorded.

=== Heliport ===
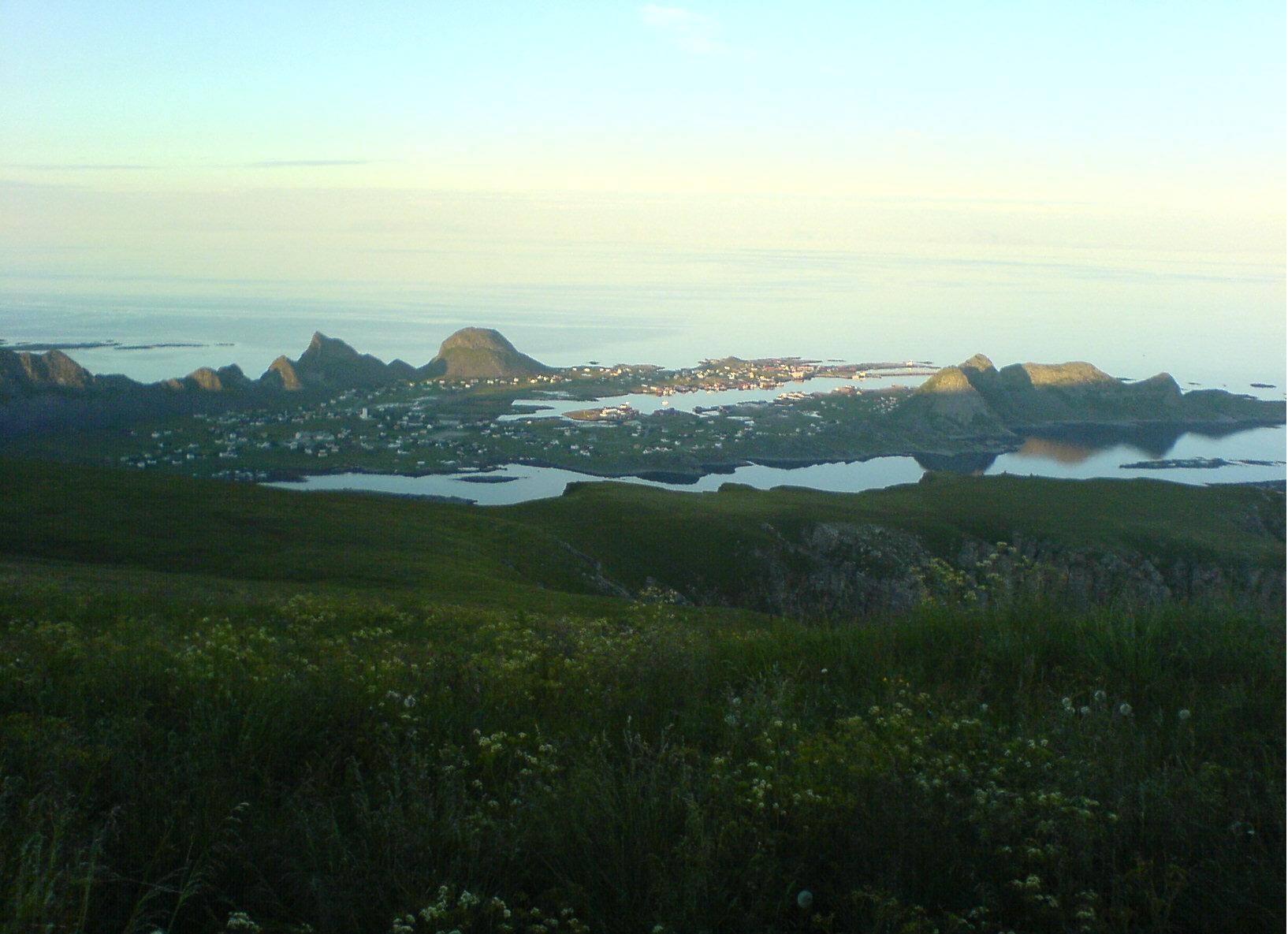
Sørland—the airport is located on the other (West) side of the Island

The airport was closed immediately after the accident. There was a local discussion of whether the airport should be reopened, but on 17 January 1992 the Ministry of Transport and Communications decided that the airport would be permanently closed. The airport facilities are now used as a private dwelling and house a small-scale chocolate factory. The Civil Aviation Administration (later renamed Avinor) started planning a new airport on the island. Initial proposals were Røssnesvågen and Kvalnes, and the ministry also considered establishing a fast ferry service.

Nordland County Municipality started a helicopter service from Værøy to Bodø on 1 January 1993, using the old heliport at Hanna Bakken-jordet. Operations were provided by Helikopter Service. Planning of a state-financed heliport and route resumed in 1995, following a government report on regional aviation. Proposed locations were the old steamship quay, Kvalnes, Torvvågen and Tobbisodden. The latter was chosen and construction commenced in 1996; the heliport was entirely financed by the Civil Aviation Administration and was officially opened on 15 February 1997.

With state-financed operations the service was made subject to public service obligations. The initial three-year contract was won by Helikopter Service, which bid NOK 22.7 million, 28 percent less than they received previously. Other contenders were Helilift and Norsk Helikopter. Helikopter Service retained the contract for three years from 1 August 1999, after being the only contender in a 1999 bid. The three-year contract issued state grants of NOK 32.25 million. In a 2002 tender, valid for three years from 1 August 2002, CHC Helikopter Service won the bid in exchange for subsidies of NOK 55.8 million.

Lufttransport won the tender valid from 1 August 2005, winning ahead of CHC with a bid of NOK 56 million. Lufttransport renewed the contract for a new three years starting 1 August 2008, after they were the only bidder in the tender. They received NOK 102 million for three years. During this period better navigational aids were installed, allowing helicopters to operate during twice per day also during the dark period of the year. Lufttransport was the only bidder for the following contract, which lasts three years from 1 August 2011. The subsidies for this period are NOK 96 million. Because it only serves helicopters, Værøy does not have an aerodrome flight information service (AFIS). As part of the Single European Sky ATM Research program, Avinor installed a remote AFIS service at Værøy, which is controlled from Bodø. If successful, the program may result in regional airports in Norway receiving remote AFIS services.

== Facilities ==
Værøy Heliport is located at Tobbisodden, the outer-most point of Kvitvarden near the village of Sørland on the island of Værøy. The heliport resides at an elevation of 5 meters (16 ft) above mean sea level. It has one helipad, designated 03–21, with an asphalt surface measuring 56 by 32 meters (184 by 105 ft). The heliport is owned and operated by the state-owned Avinor. The airport has seventeen free parking spaces; taxis are available. Driving distance to the center of Sørland is five minutes.

== Airlines and destinations ==
Services to Værøy are provided to Bodø twice per day by Lufttransport using a fifteen-seat AgustaWestland AW139 helicopter. The airline operates the route on a public service obligation contract with the Ministry of Transport and Communications. The airport handled 9,420 passengers, 1,252 aircraft movements and 27 tonnes of cargo in 2014.

| Airlines | Destinations |
|---|---|
| Lufttransport | Bodø |

== Statistics ==
Annual passenger traffic
| Year | Passengers | % Change |
|---|---|---|
| 2025 | 9,092 | ▲19.8% |
| 2024 | 7,588 | ▼ -5.5% |
| 2023 | 8,031 | ▲12.0% |
| 2022 | 7,171 | ▼ -0.8% |
| 2021 | 7,231 | ▲15.6% |
| 2020 | 6,255 | ▼ -25.3% |
| 2019 | 8,372 | ▼ -3.8% |
| 2018 | 8,704 | ▼ -1.0% |
| 2017 | 8,793 | ▼ -0.6% |
| 2016 | 8,842 | ▼ -2.9% |
| 2015 | 9,104 | |
