= Værøy Lighthouse =

Coastal lighthouse in Værøy, Norway

Værøy Lighthouse Værøy fyrstasjon
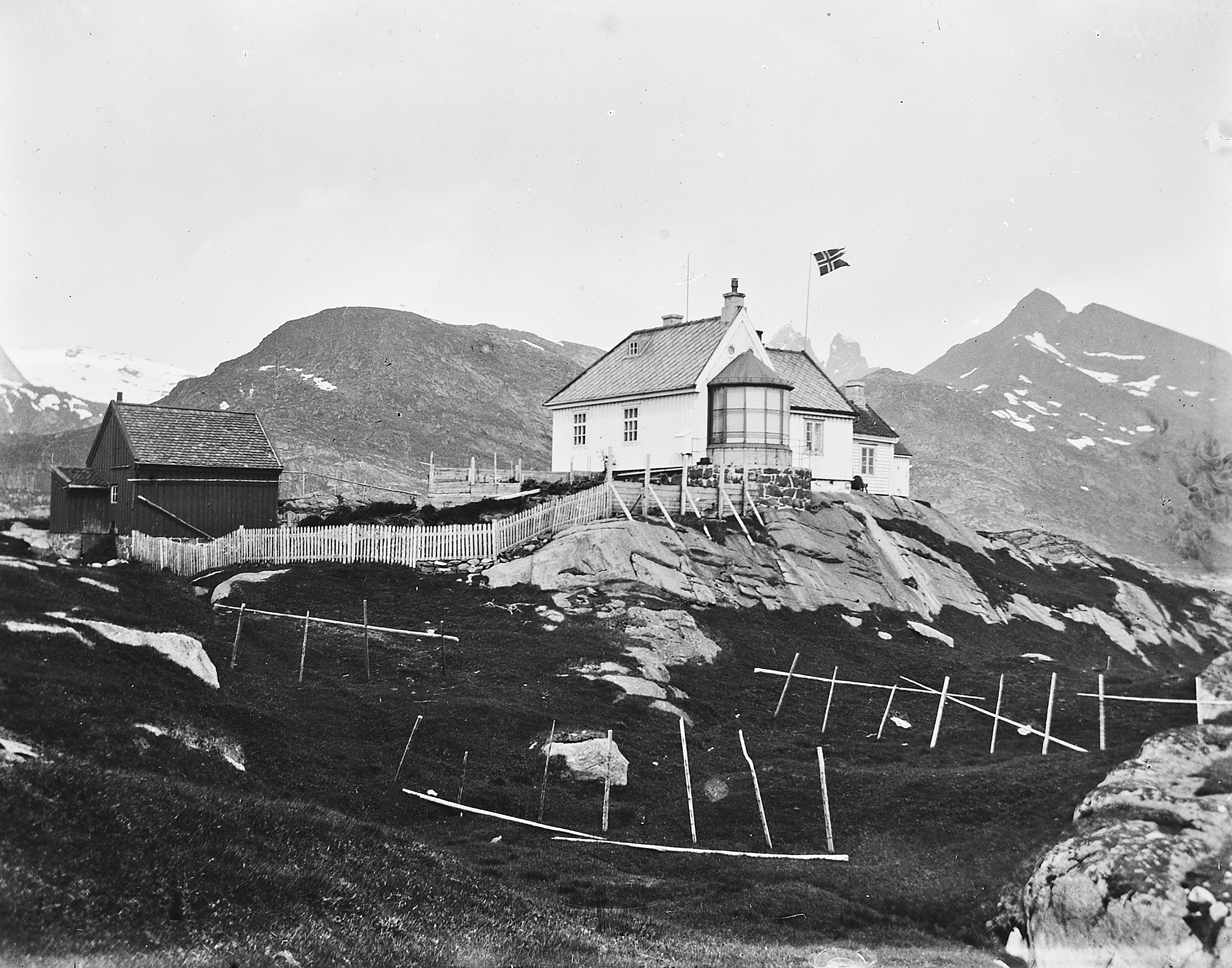
- View of the lighthouse
- Location of the lighthouse
- Location: Værøy Municipality, Nordland, Norway
- Coordinates: 67°39′N 12°43′E

Tower
- Constructed: 1880
- Construction: stone tower
- Automated: 1984
- Height: 13.8 metres (45 ft)
- Shape: square tower with balcony and lantern on the keeper's house roof
- Markings: white tower, red lantern

Light
- Deactivated: 2008
- Focal height: 14.5 metres (48 ft)
- Intensity: 27,900 candela
- Range: 12.5 nmi (23.2 km; 14.4 mi)
- Norway no.: 768200

Værøy Lighthouse (Norwegian: Værøy fyr) is a coastal lighthouse in Værøy Municipality in Nordland county, Norway. The lighthouse is built on a small peninsula southeast of the village of Sørland on the island of Værøya. It was constructed in 1880 and automated in 1984. The lighthouse has not been used since 2008.

== History ==
The 15-metre (49 ft) tall square, stone tower was built in 1880. The red-topped tower was attached to a white lighthouse keeper's house. The 27,900-candela light can be seen for up to 12.5 nautical miles (23.2 km; 14.4 mi). The light was lit from dusk to dawn from 4 August until 2 May each year. It was not lit during the summer due to the midnight sun in the region.

== See also ==
- Lighthouses in Norway
- List of lighthouses in Norway
