= Måstad, Værøy =

Abandoned village in Værøy Municipality, Norway

Måstad Mostad
- Abandoned Village
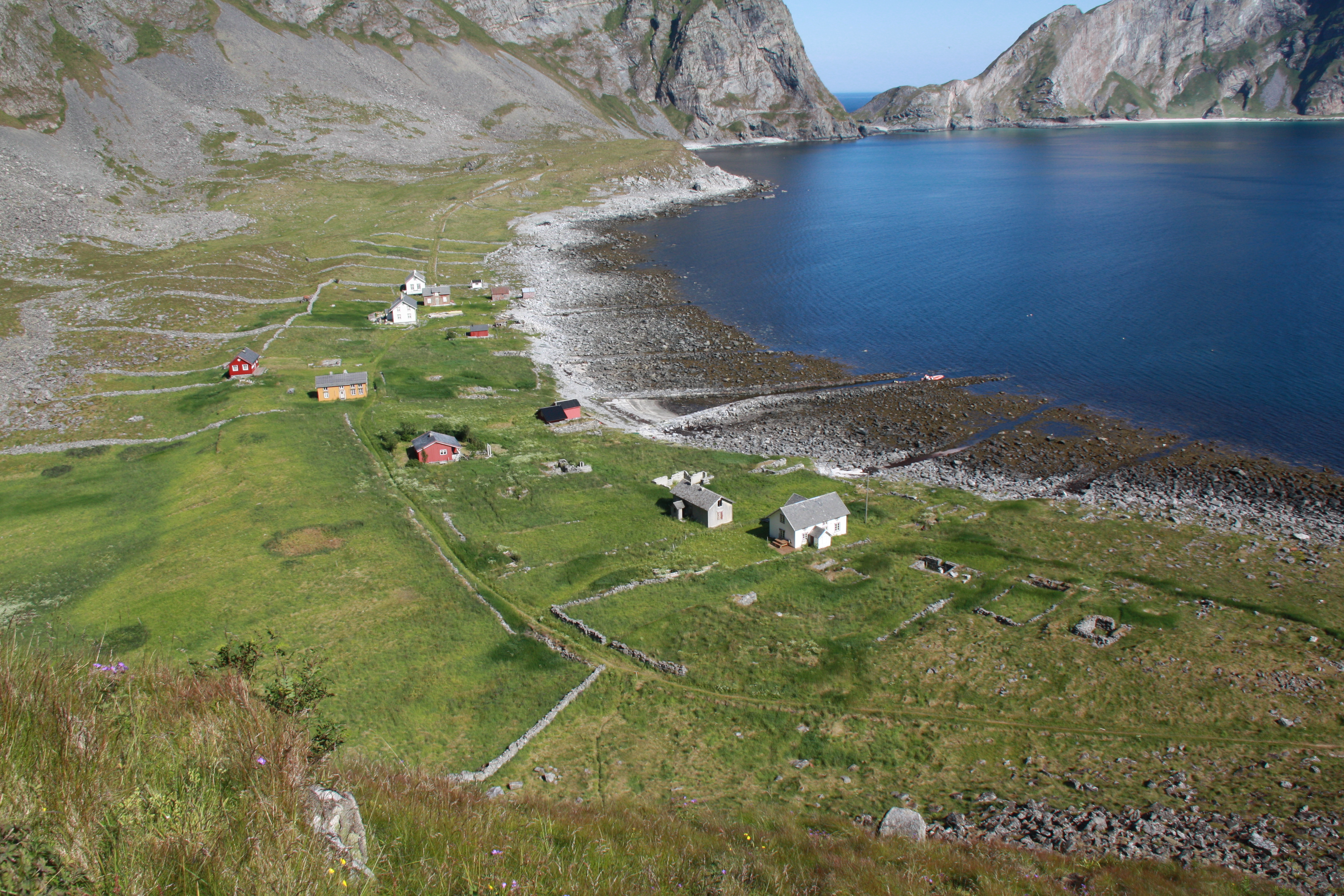
- View of the village
- Interactive map of Måstad
- Location within Nordland Location within Norway
- Coordinates: 67.6436°N 12.5938°E
- Country: Norway
- Region: Northern Norway
- County: Nordland
- District: Lofoten
- Municipality: Værøy Municipality
- Elevation: 4 m (13 ft)

Måstad is an abandoned village on the southern part of the island of Værøya at the southern end of the Lofoten archipelago and is located on a strandflat. It is located in Værøy Municipality in Nordland county, Norway. It is currently use as summer houses or cabins from the locals.

Måstad was in its prime around the year 1900 when over 120 people lived here. However, because there are no roads connecting to it from the rest of the island and it has a very unsatisfactory harbour, the village was abandoned a few years after World War II. The last citizens left Måstad in the 1950s. Today, the place is an El Dorado for those who seek wilderness and beauty. From 1950 to 1960, there were several houses from Måstad that were moved to the village of Sørland on the other side of the island where living was much easier. Today only a few houses are left still standing.

Catching puffins was a subsidiary source of income beside fishing. Catching puffins involved the use of the unusual puffin dog, also termed the Mostad dog or the Norwegian Lundehund. Puffin meat was cured in salt and lasted way into the autumn. Today, there are about 600 puffin dogs in Norway. All of them can be traced back to Måstad. Going ashore at Måstad is generally combined with a fishing trip or an expedition by boat to the bird cliffs. Måstad can also be reached by foot. Since 1996, simple overnight accommodation has been available at the schoolhouse in the village.

== In literature ==
Pål Espolin Johnson's "For Love of Norway" is a fictionalized history of the village seen through the eyes of Magda, who arrives in 1909 to marry a local fisherman. This compelling, simply-told episodic account of residents of Mostad in the first few decades of the 20th century provides an intimate glimpse in lives lived in a harsh and unforgiving place, but one filled with human warmth.

== Media gallery ==
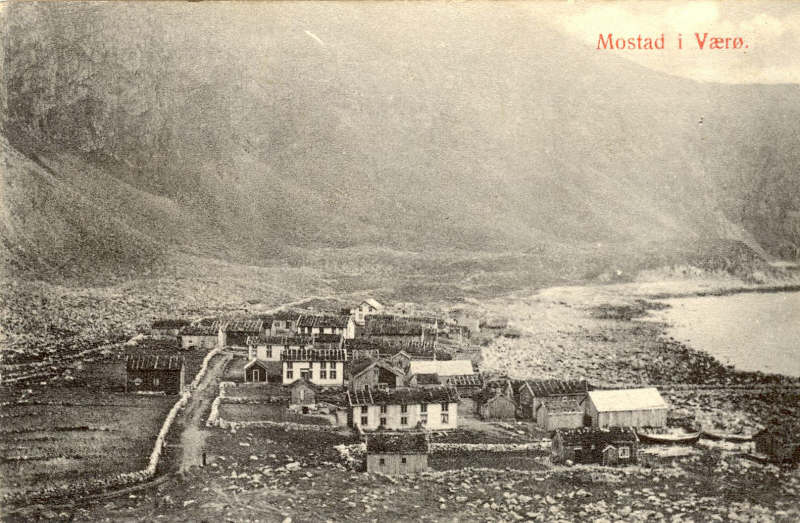
View of the only road in the village, Husbekkveien, from around 1900

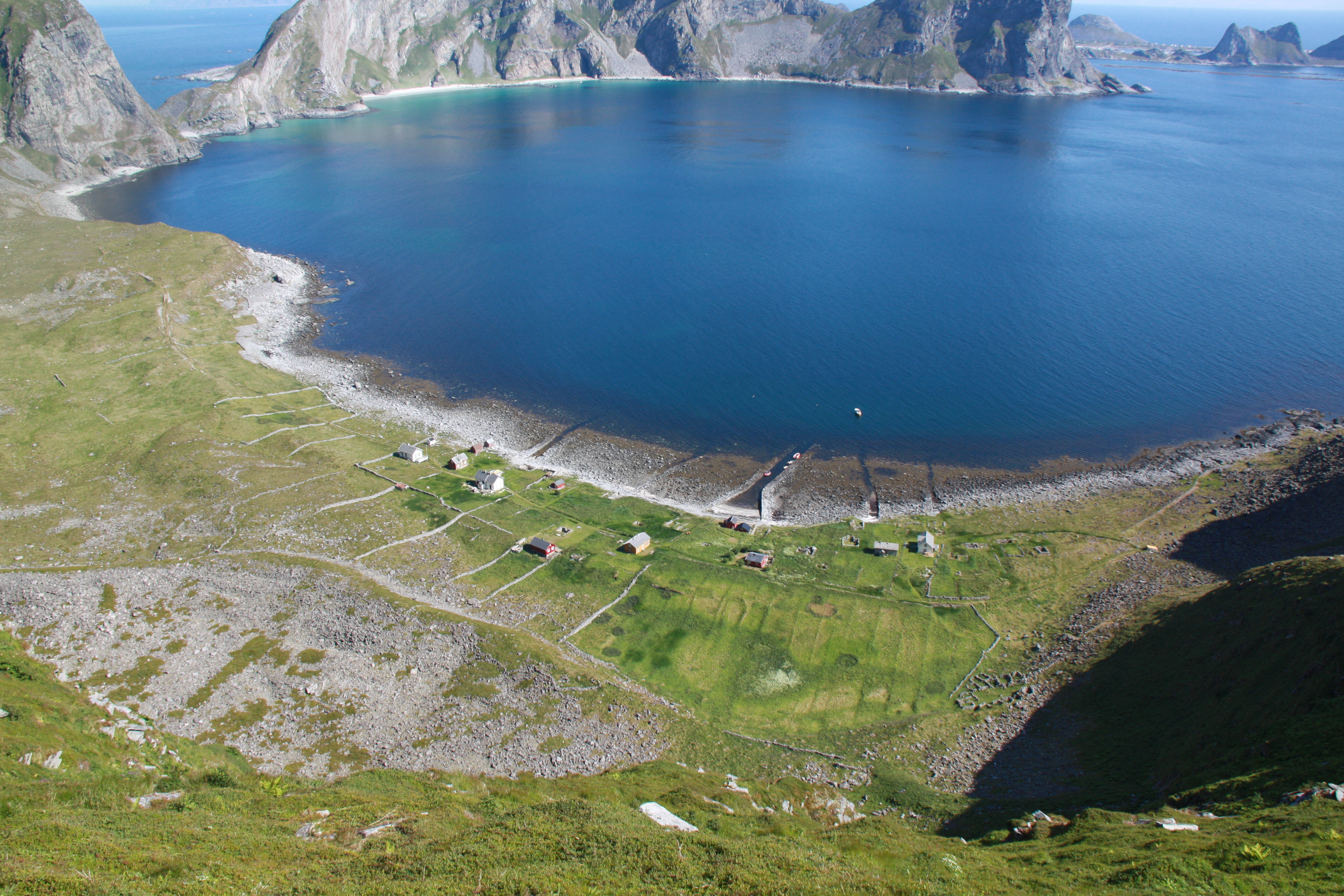
View from above, looking down on the remaining houses (2009)

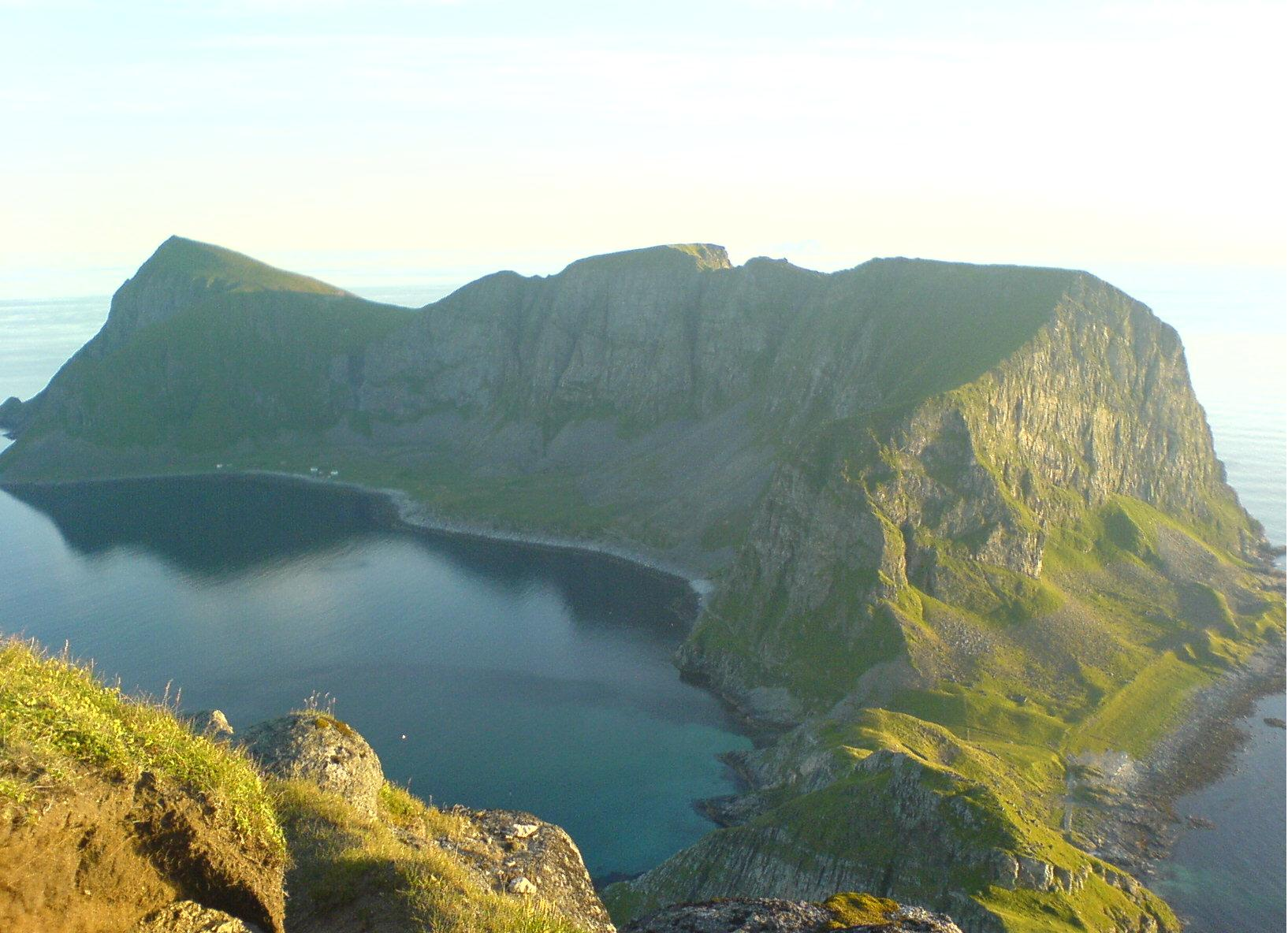
View looking south at the village at the base of the mountain

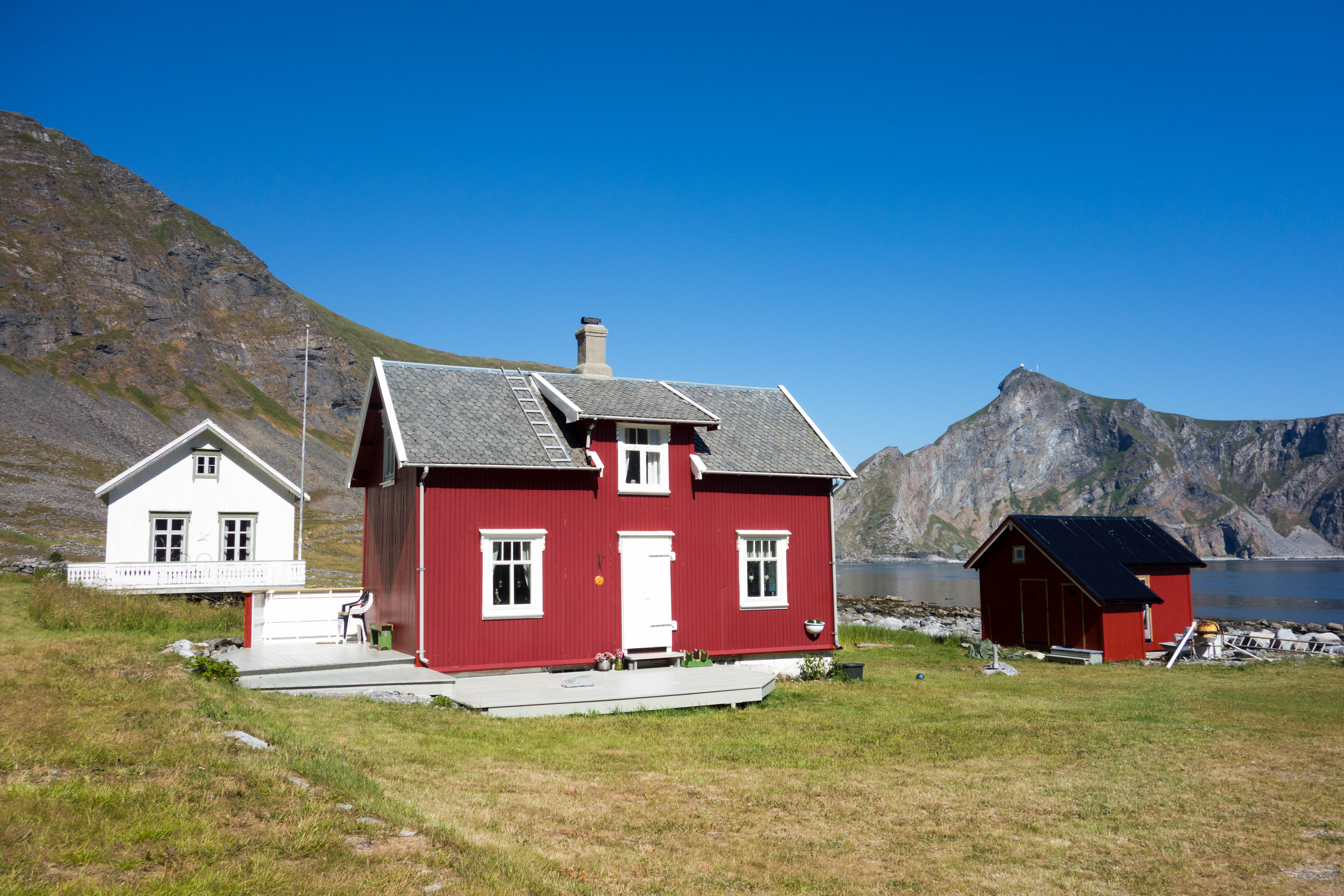
House in Måstad

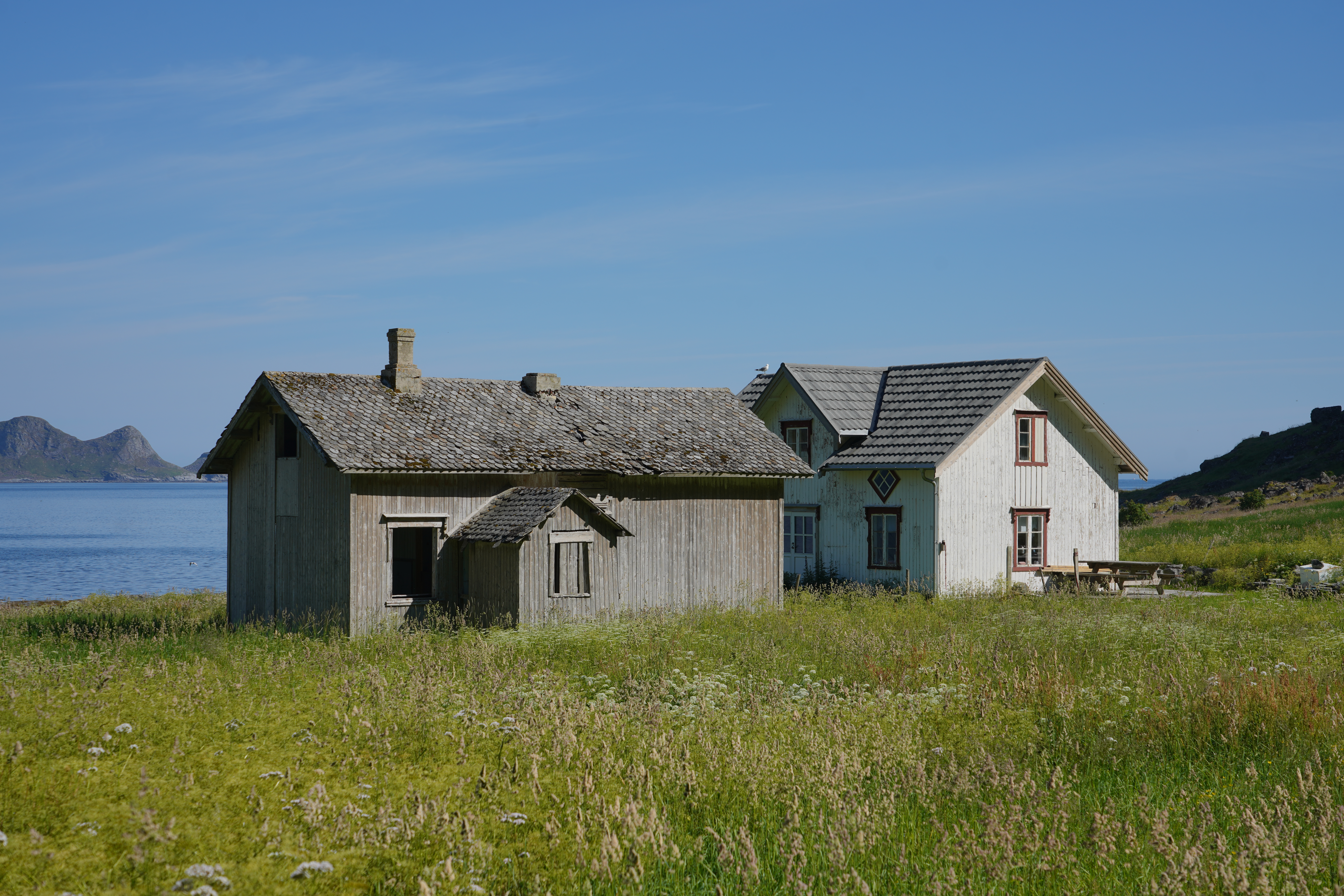
Houses in Måstad

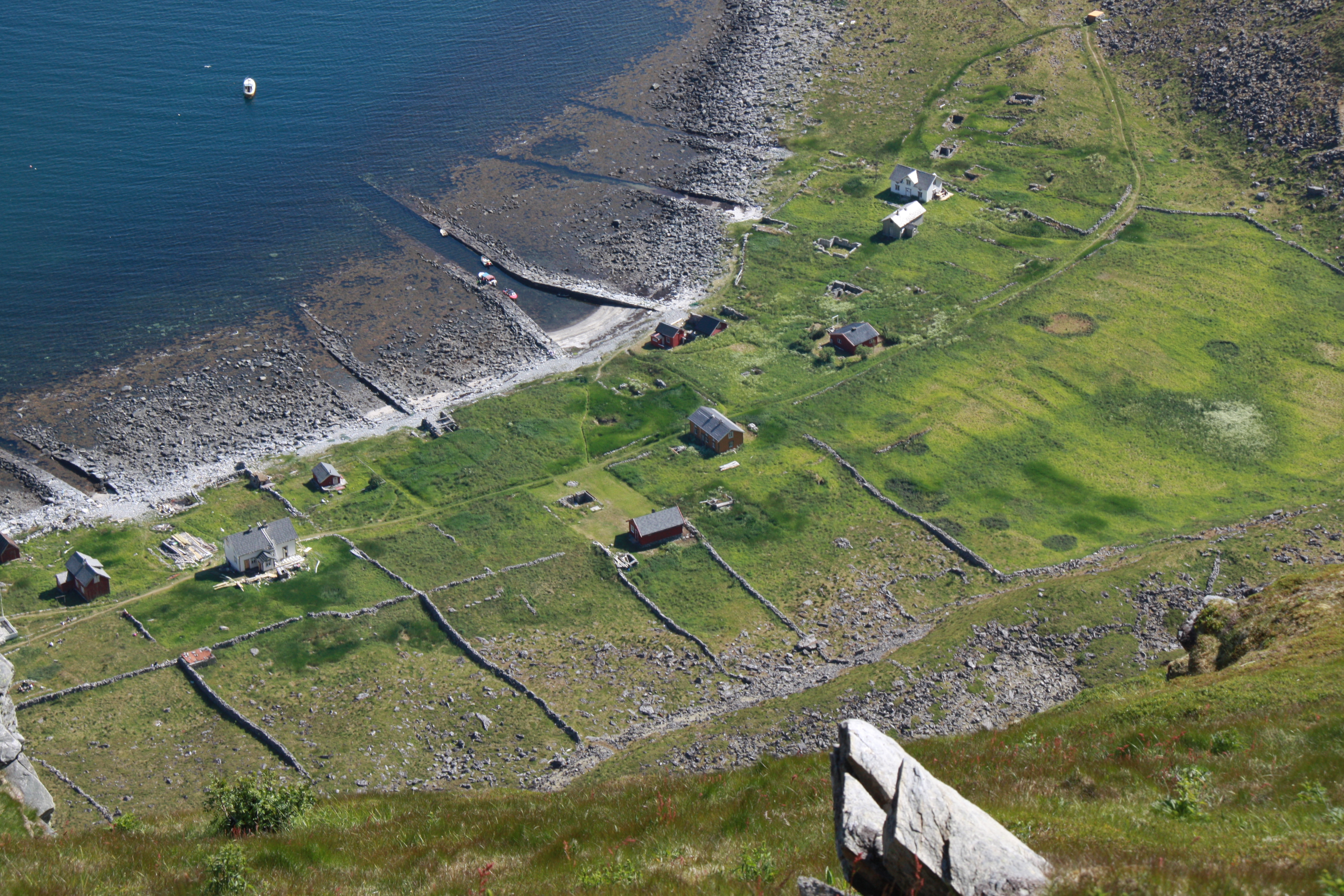
View of the village

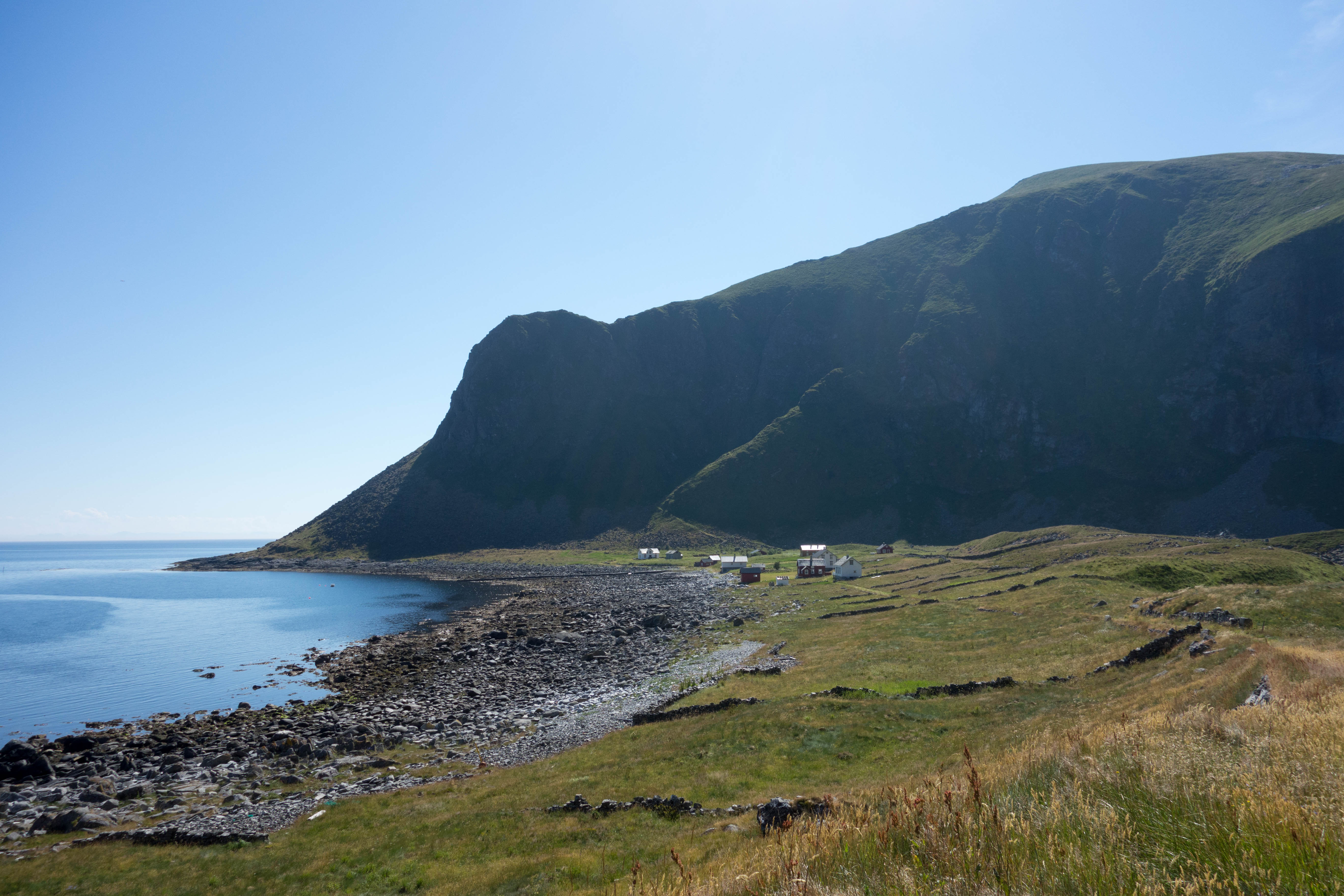
View of the abandoned village in 2014
