= Old Værøy Church =

- Værøy gamle kirke
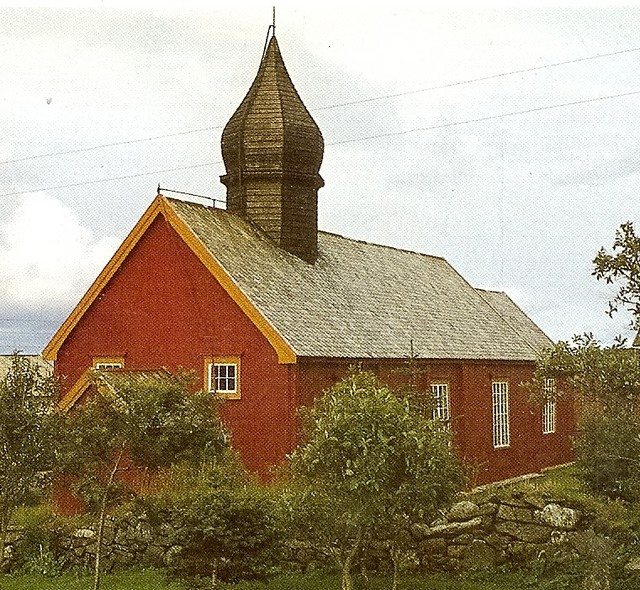
- View of the church
- Old Værøy Church
- 67.6929531°N 12.7094671°E
- Location: Værøy, Nordland
- Country: Norway
- Denomination: Church of Norway
- Churchmanship: Evangelical Lutheran

History
- Status: Parish church
- Founded: 15th century
- Consecrated: 1799
- Events: Moved to Værøy in 1799

Architecture
- Functional status: Active
- Architectural type: Long church
- Completed: 1714 (312 years ago)

Specifications
- Materials: Wood

Administration
- Diocese: Sør-Hålogaland
- Deanery: Bodø domprosti
- Parish: Værøy
- Norwegian Cultural Heritage Site
- Type: Church
- Status: Automatically protected
- ID: 85876

Old Værøy Church (Norwegian: Værøy gamle kirke) is a historic parish church of the Church of Norway in Værøy Municipality in Nordland county, Norway. It is located in the village of Nordland on the northern side of the island of Værøya. It used to be the main church for the Værøy parish which is part of the Bodø domprosti (deanery) in the Diocese of Sør-Hålogaland. The red, wooden church was built in a long church style in 1714 (in another location) and it was moved to its present location in 1799. It is the oldest church in Lofoten that is still in use.

== History ==
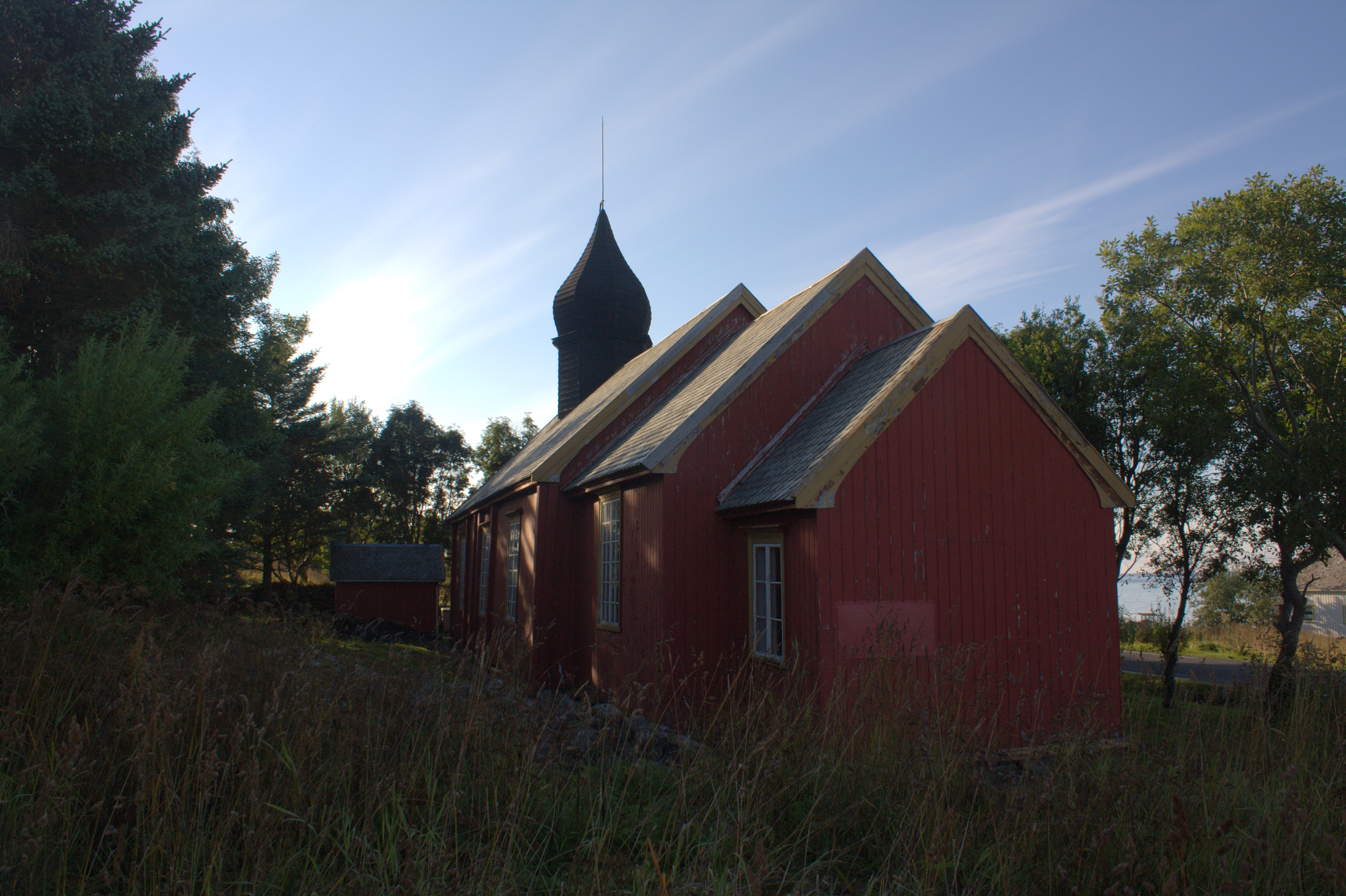
Another view of the church

The earliest existing historical records of the church date back to the year 1589, but the church was not new that year. The first church on the island of Værøya was built in the village of Nordland, probably during the 1400s. Around the year 1599, the old church building was either heavily repaired or torn down and rebuilt. In 1750, the church was described as a low, wooden building with bracing beams on the north side to help strengthen the wall.

In 1790, strong winds heavily damaged the church during a storm. The church was torn down and plans for its replacement began immediately. Rather than building a new church on the site, it was decided to purchase the Vaagan Church (built in 1714) in the nearby village of Kabelvåg (in what is now Vågan Municipality). This church was too small for the congregation, so they were planning to build a new church anyway. So in 1799, the church was disassembled and moved to Værøy where it was rebuilt. Some furniture from the old church still exists in today's church. The church was a long church design with no tower.

In 1814, this church served as an election church (Norwegian: valgkirke). Together with more than 300 other parish churches across Norway, it was a polling station for elections to the 1814 Norwegian Constituent Assembly which wrote the Constitution of Norway. This was Norway's first national elections. Each church parish was a constituency that elected people called "electors" who later met together in each county to elect the representatives for the assembly that was to meet at Eidsvoll Manor later that year.

The church underwent extensive remodeling and renovations from 1828 until 1837. During the 1880s, a storm ravaged the church and it again needed rebuilding. During the rebuilding, the choir was extended by one-third and the sacristy was also enlarged. Major repair work was also undertaken in 1919. In 1939, rather than replacing the aging church, it was decided to build a new Værøy Church in the village of Sørland on the south side of the island, where most residents lived. The new church became the main church for the parish, and the old church was renamed "Old Værøy Church". The old church is still used for worship services about once each month.

== See also ==
- List of churches in Sør-Hålogaland
