= Værøy Church =

- Værøy kirke
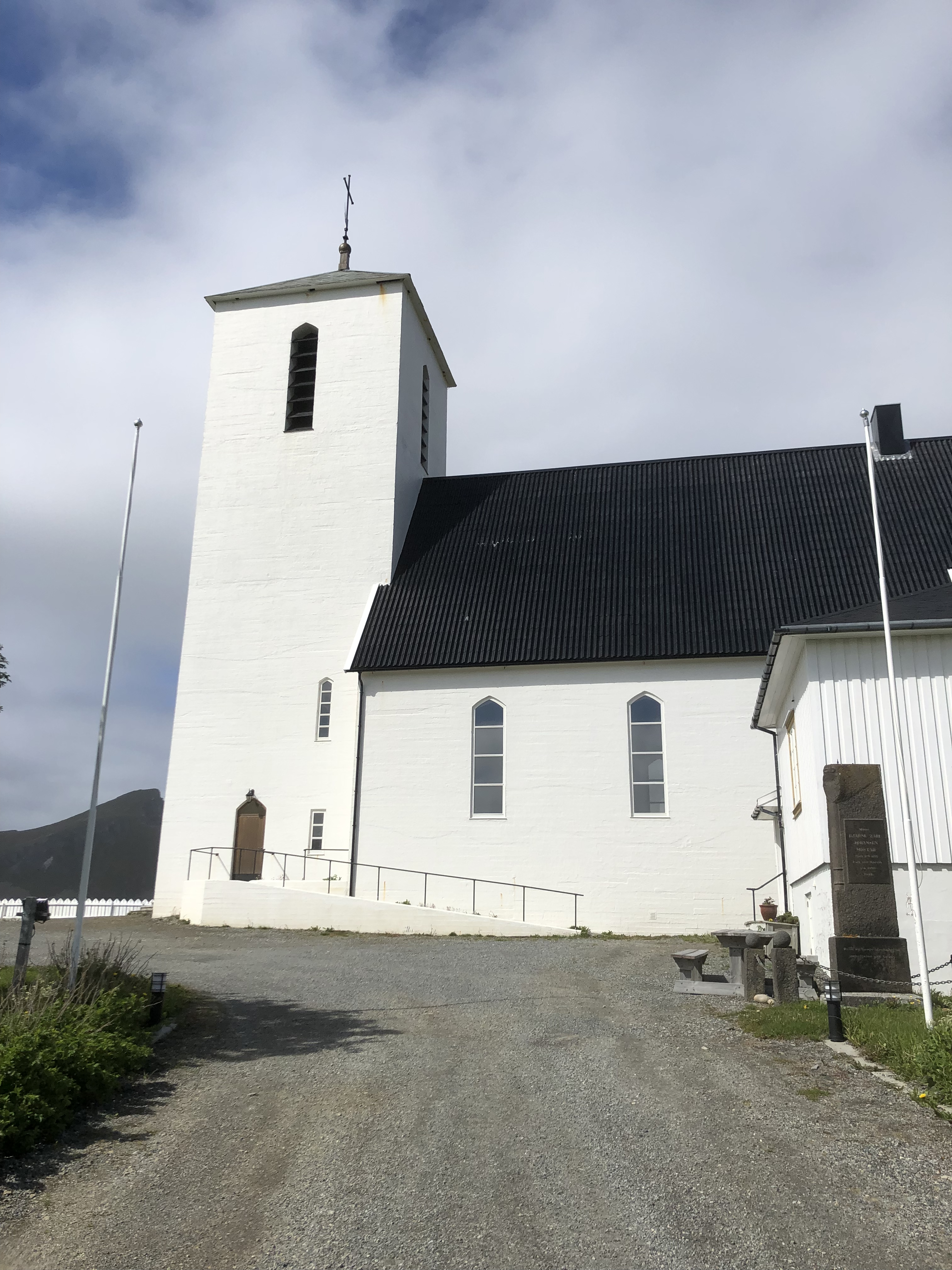
- View of the church
- Værøy Church
- 67.6653937°N 12.6949677°E
- Location: Værøy, Nordland
- Country: Norway
- Denomination: Church of Norway
- Churchmanship: Evangelical Lutheran

History
- Status: Parish church
- Founded: 1939
- Consecrated: 1939

Architecture
- Functional status: Active
- Architect: Harald Sund
- Architectural type: Long church
- Completed: 1939 (87 years ago)

Specifications
- Capacity: 313
- Materials: Stone

Administration
- Diocese: Sør-Hålogaland
- Deanery: Bodø domprosti
- Parish: Værøy

Værøy Church (Norwegian: Værøy kirke) is a parish church of the Church of Norway in Værøy Municipality in Nordland county, Norway. It is located in the village of Sørland on the south side of the island of Værøya. It is the church for the Værøy parish which is part of the Bodø domprosti (deanery) in the Diocese of Sør-Hålogaland. The white, stone church was built in a long church style in 1939 using plans drawn up by the architect Harald Sund. The church seats about 313 people.

== History ==
The Old Værøy Church was the only church on the island from the late 1700s onwards. That church was located in village of Nordland, about 5 kilometres (3.1 mi) north of the main village, Sørland, on the other side of the island. In the 1930s, a new church was planned. Since the majority of the population lived in Sørland, the new church was built there. The old church is still used once a month for worship services.

== See also ==
- List of churches in Sør-Hålogaland
