= Bernhard-Jens Eggesbø =

Norwegian military officer and civil servant (1931–2019)

- Born: 26 December 1931; Værøy, Norway
- Died: 2 March 2019 (aged 87)
- Allegiance: Norway
- Branch: Norwegian Army
- Education: Stanford University

Bernhard-Jens Eggesbø (26 December 1931 – 2 March 2019) was a Norwegian military officer and civil servant.

== Biography ==
Bernhard-Jens Eggesbø was born in Værøy Municipality on 26 December 1931. He finished his secondary education in Finnfjordbotn in 1950 and took a degree in civil engineering at Stanford University. He graduated in 1957 and took the Master of Science degree in 1958. His early career was spent in the Norwegian Armed Forces. He was stationed various places until 1964, when he worked for the NATO International Staff in Paris and Brussels. From 1972 to 1982 he was the technical director of Forsvarets Fellessamband in Norway, and from 1982 to 1990 he was a deputy under-secretary of state in the Norwegian Ministry of Defence. In 1989 he applied unsuccessfully for the position as permanent under-secretary of state, the highest-ranking bureaucratic position, in the Ministry of Defence. From 1990 he was a counsellor in Norway's NATO delegation in Brussels.

Eggesbø was a Commander of the Order of the Polar Star and the Ordre national du Mérite, and was decorated with the Forsvarsmdaljen. He resided in Nesbru. Eggesbø died on 2 March 2019, at the age of 87.
