= Willy Arne Wold =

Norwegian politician

Willy Arne Wold (26 August 1929, in Værøy – 13 February 1996) was a Norwegian politician for the Centre Party.

He was elected to the Norwegian Parliament from Nordland in 1969, and was re-elected on one occasion.

On the local level he was a member of the municipal council of Værøy Municipality from 1963 to 1967, and then served as mayor in the terms 1967–1971 and 1975–1979. From 1967 to 1971 he was also a member of Nordland county council.
