= Nordland, Nordland =

Village in Værøy Municipality, Norway

Nordland
- Village
- Interactive map of Nordland
- Location within Nordland Location within Norway
- Coordinates: 67.6933°N 12.7032°E
- Country: Norway
- Region: Northern Norway
- County: Nordland
- District: Lofoten
- Municipality: Værøy Municipality
- Elevation: 8 m (26 ft)
- Time zone: UTC+01:00 (CET)
  - Summer (DST): UTC+02:00 (CEST)
- Post Code: 8063 Værøy

Nordland is a village in Værøy Municipality in Nordland county, Norway. It is located on the northern coast of the island of Værøya, about 5 kilometres (3.1 mi) north of the village of Sørland, the municipal centre. Nordland is the location of the Old Værøy Church, and the site of the old Værøy Airport lies just to the southwest of the village.
