= Sørland =

Village in Værøy Municipality, Norway

- Village
- Interactive map of Sørland
- Location within Nordland Location within Norway
- Coordinates: 67.6656°N 12.6978°E
- Country: Norway
- Region: Northern Norway
- County: Nordland
- District: Lofoten
- Municipality: Værøy Municipality

Area
  - Total: 1.07 km^{2} (0.41 sq mi)
- Elevation: 3 m (9.8 ft)

Population (2023)
  - Total: 599
  - Density: 560/km^{2} (1,500/sq mi)
- Time zone: UTC+01:00 (CET)
  - Summer (DST): UTC+02:00 (CEST)
- Post Code: 8063 Værøy

Sørland is a seaside resort, fishing village, and the administrative centre of Værøy Municipality in Nordland county, Norway. It is located on the southern side of the island of Værøya. The village is the main population center of the island, and it is the location of Værøy Church, Værøy Heliport, and Værøy Lighthouse. The village of Nordland lies about 5 kilometres (3.1 mi) to the north and the now-abandoned village of Måstad is located about 5 kilometres (3.1 mi) to the southwest. There are no other villages on the island.

The 1.07-square-kilometre (260-acre) village has a population (2023) of 599 and a population density of 560 inhabitants per square kilometre (1,500/sq mi). Sørland has ferry connections to the nearby village of Røstlandet (on the island of Røst), the town of Bodø (on the mainland), and the village of Sørvågen (on the island of Moskenesøya).

== Media gallery ==
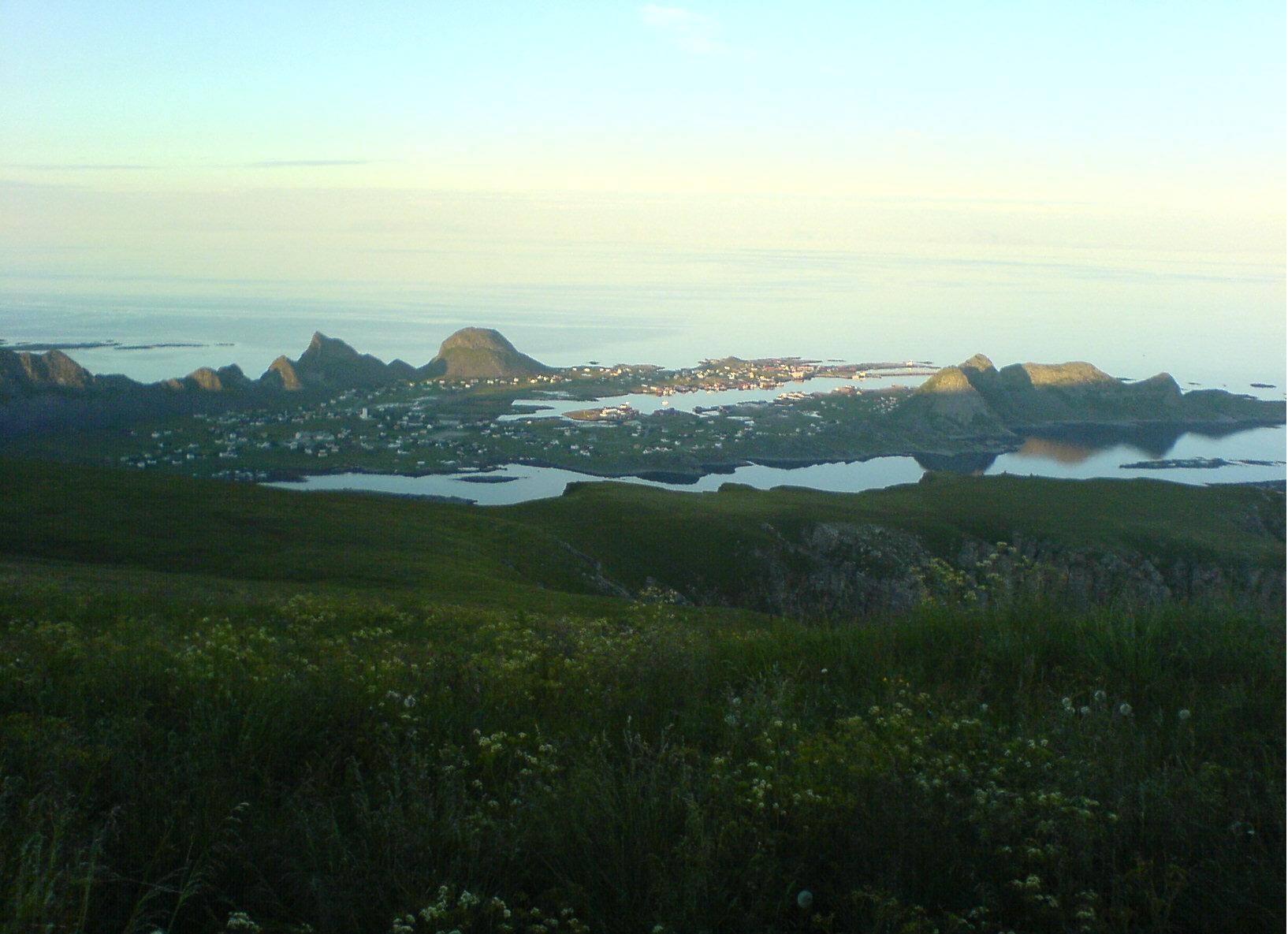

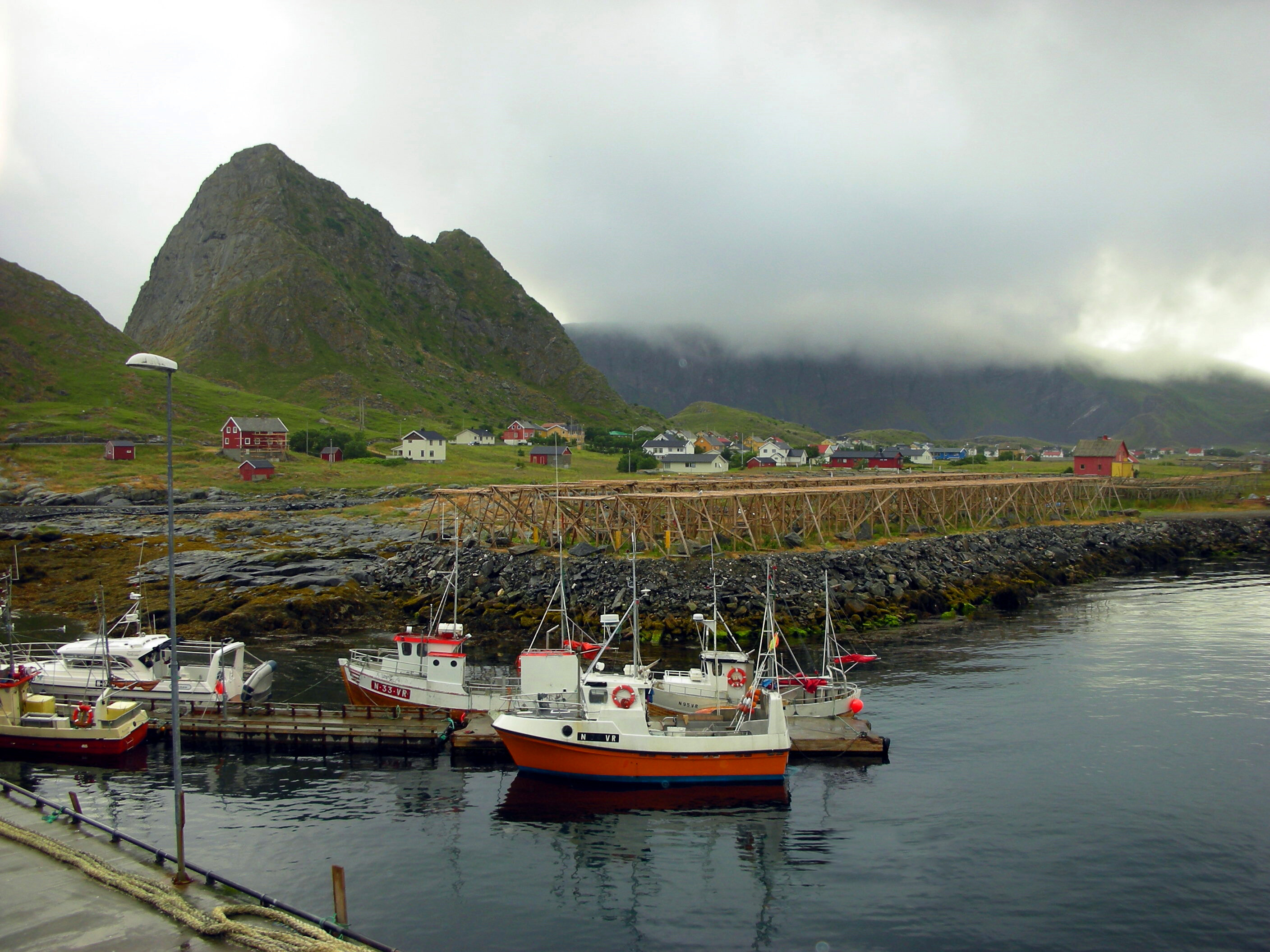

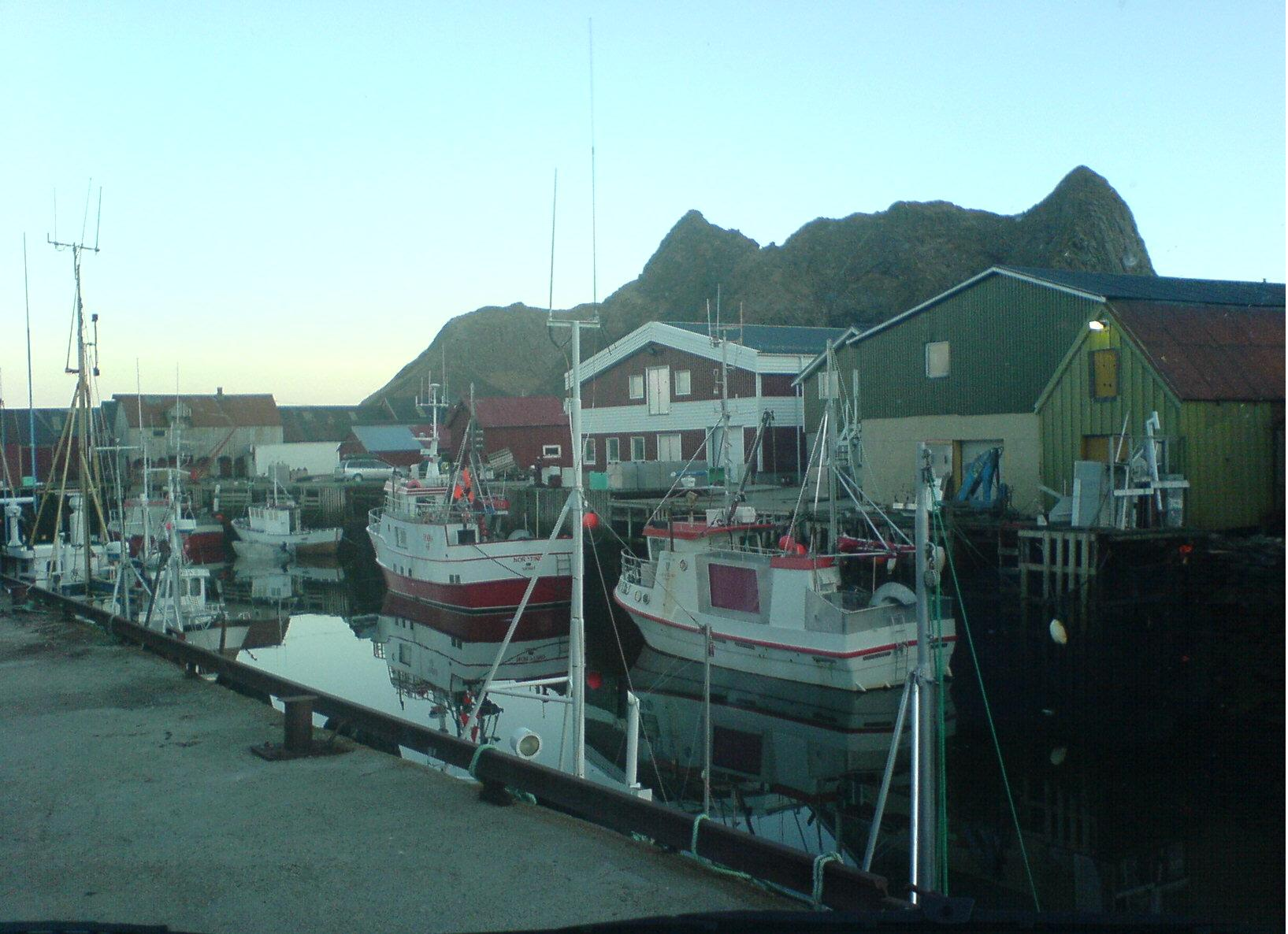

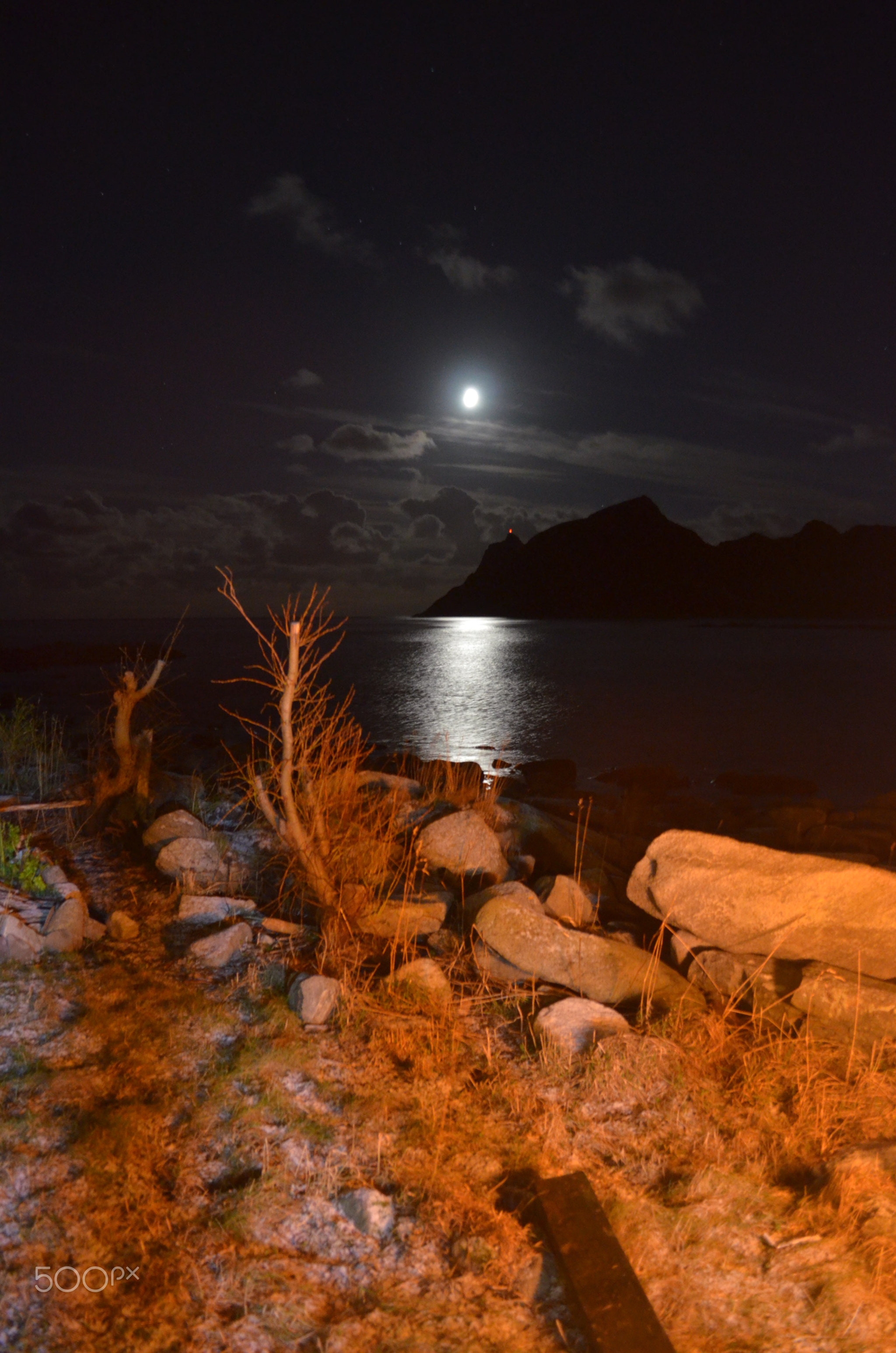

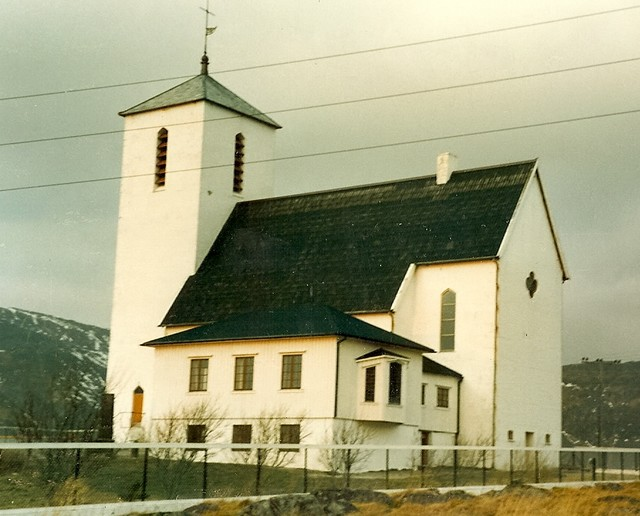
