= Værøy Municipality =

Municipality in Nordland, Norway

Værøy Municipality Værøy kommune
- Municipality
- Værø herred (historic name)
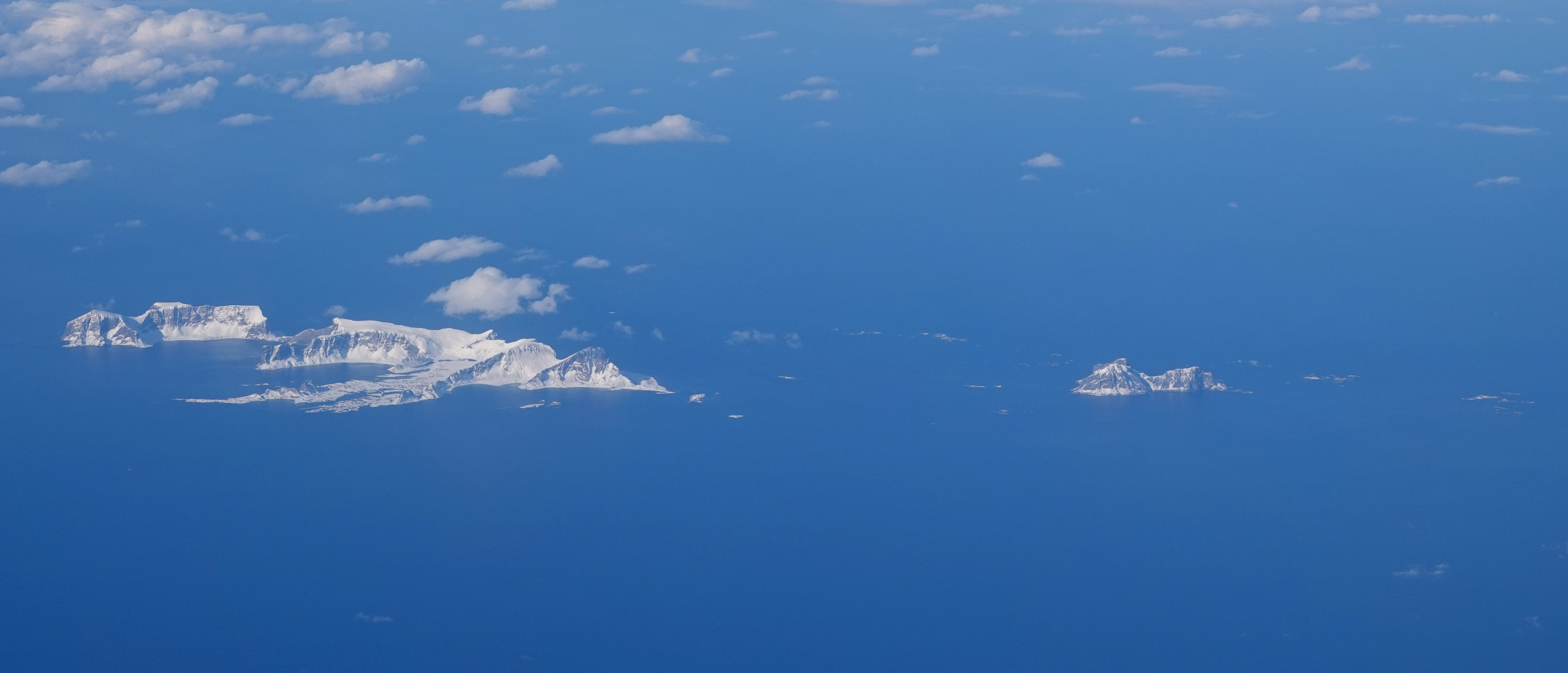
- The islands and islets of Værøy

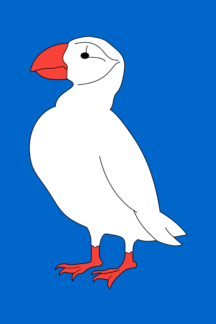
- Flag Coat of arms

- Nordland within Norway

- Værøy within Nordland
- Coordinates: 67°40′23″N 12°40′09″E
- Country: Norway
- County: Nordland
- District: Lofoten
- Established: 1 Jan 1838
- Administrative centre: Sørland

Government
  - Mayor (2019): Susann Hjørdis Berg Kristiansen (LL)

Area
  - Total: 18.64 km^{2} (7.20 sq mi)
  - Land: 18.61 km^{2} (7.19 sq mi)
  - Water: 0.03 km^{2} (0.012 sq mi) 0.2%
  - Rank: #352 in Norway
- Highest elevation: 450.13 m (1,476.8 ft)

Population (2024)
  - Total: 683
  - Rank: #348 in Norway
  - Density: 36.6/km^{2} (95/sq mi)
  - Change (10 years): ▼ −12.1%
- Demonym: Værøyværing

Official language
  - Norwegian form: Bokmål
- Time zone: UTC+01:00 (CET)
  - Summer (DST): UTC+02:00 (CEST)
- ISO 3166 code: NO-1857
- Website: Official website

Værøy is an island municipality in Nordland county, Norway. It is part of the traditional district of Lofoten. The administrative centre of the municipality is the village of Sørland on the main island of Værøya. The other village in Værøy is Nordland. Most of the residents live in the Sørland area surrounding the main harbor. The old Værøy Lighthouse sits at the end of that harbor.

The 19-square-kilometre (7.3 sq mi) municipality is the 352nd largest by area out of the 357 municipalities in Norway. Værøy Municipality is the 348th most populous municipality in Norway with a population of only 683. The municipality's population density is 36.6 inhabitants per square kilometre (95/sq mi) and its population has decreased by 12.1% over the previous 10-year period.

== General information ==
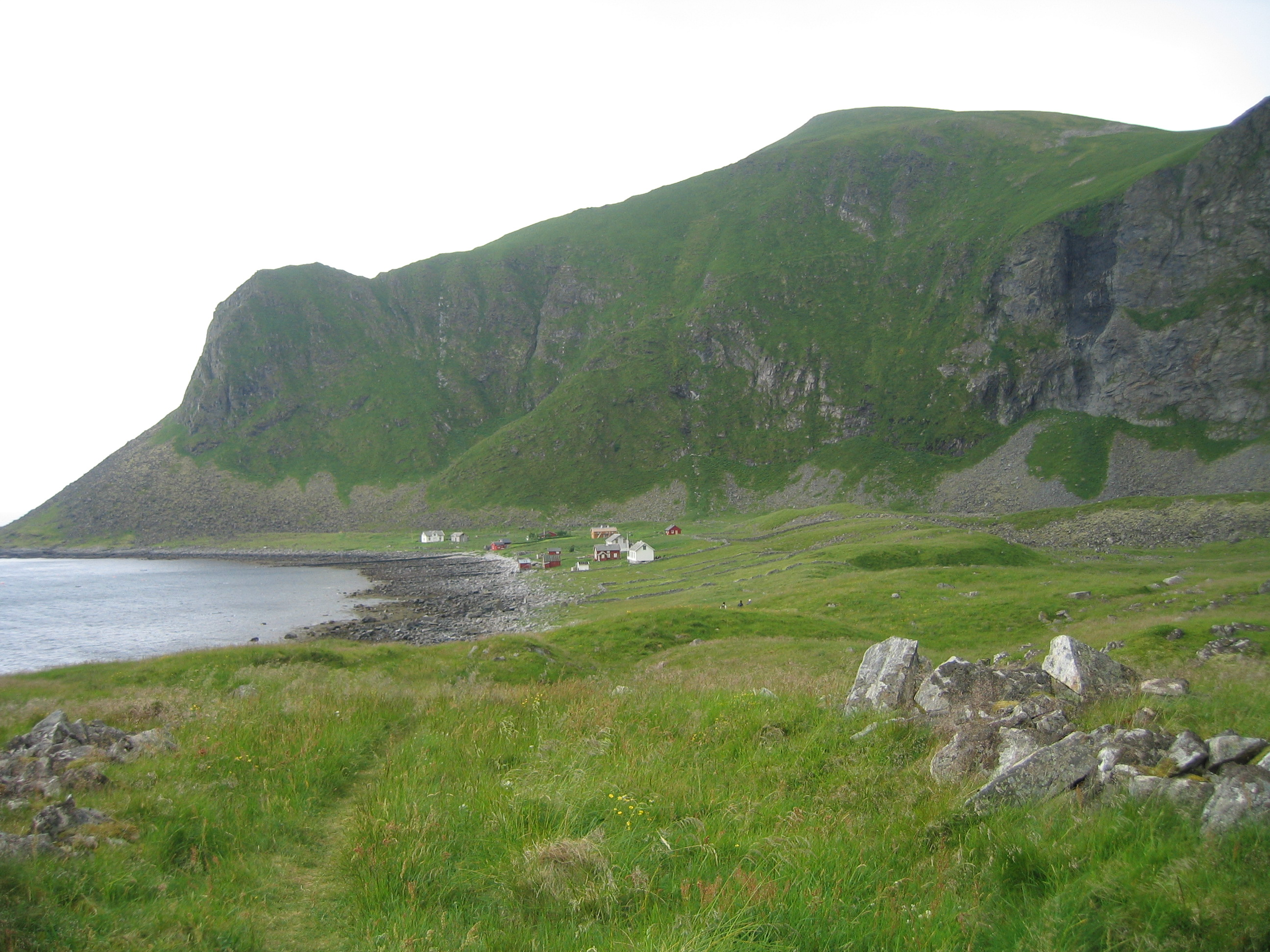
Måstad

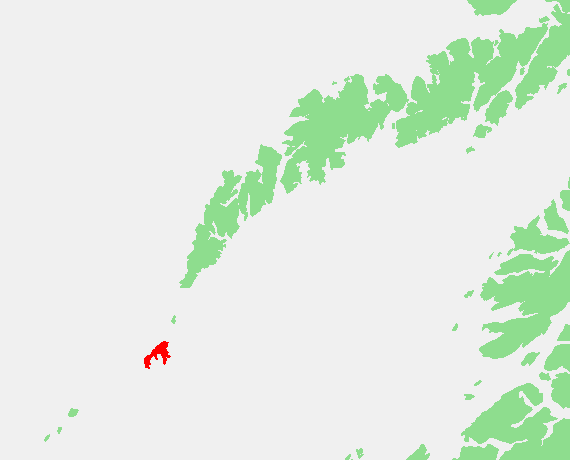
Location of Værøy

Værøy Municipality was established on 1 January 1838 (see formannskapsdistrikt law). On 1 July 1928, the southern district of Værøy (population: 731) was separated to become the new Røst Municipality. The borders have not changed since that time.

=== Name ===
The municipality (originally the parish) is named after the island of Værøya (Old Norse: Veðrøy) since the first Værøy Church was built there. The first element is the word veðr which means "weather" (here referring to harsh weather and the exposed and unsheltered position of the island). The last element is øy which means "island". Historically, the name of the municipality was spelled Værø. On 6 January 1908, a royal resolution changed the spelling of the name of the municipality to Værøy.

=== Coat of arms ===
The coat of arms was granted on 7 October 1988. The official blazon is "Azure, a puffin argent armed gules" (Norwegian: I blått en sølv lundefugl). This means the arms have a blue field (background) and the charge is a puffin. The puffin has a tincture of argent which means it is commonly colored white, but if it is made out of metal, then silver is used. The charge is also "armed gules" which means that the beak and feet are colored red. The blue color in the field symbolizes the importance of the sea. The charge is a puffin to represent the fact that they nest in large numbers in the area and historically, they held great importance for the island municipality, both for meat and down feathers. The arms were designed by John Digernes.

=== Churches ===
The Church of Norway has one parish (sokn) within Værøy Municipality. It is part of the Bodø domprosti (arch-deanery) in the Diocese of Sør-Hålogaland.

Churches in Værøy Municipality
Parish (sokn)	Church name	Location of the church	Year built
Værøy	Værøy Church	Sørland	1939
Værøy	Old Værøy Church	Nordland	1799

== Geography ==
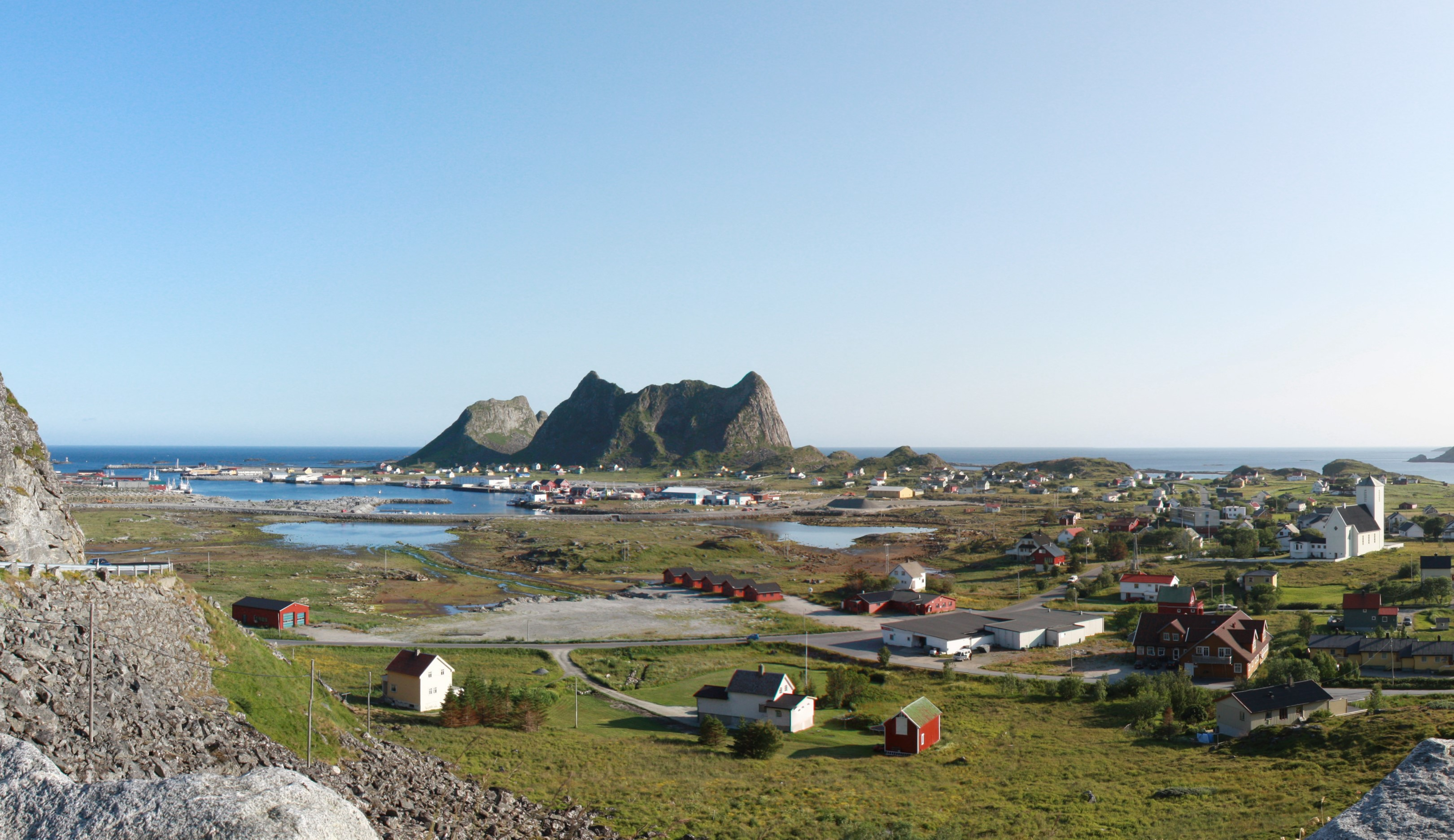
Sørland village in Værøy

The island municipality is made up of many islands, the two largest islands being Værøya and Mosken. It is located at the end of the Lofoten archipelago. The Norwegian Sea lies to the northwest and the Vestfjorden lies to the southeast. The Moskenstraumen maelstrom lies to the north between Værøya and Moskenesøya. The highest point in the municipality is the 450.13-metre (1,476.8 ft) tall mountain Nordlandsnupen, on the south side of the village of Nordland.

=== Climate ===
The weather in Værøy can be very changeable. Sunshine, rain, wind, and mist may interchange rapidly. The winter climate is mild and the temperature seldom drops much below 0 °C (32 °F) even in mid-winter. This makes conditions for stockfish exceptionally good.

Røst and Værøy are among the most northern locations in the world where there is no meteorological winter because the average temperature generally stays above freezing all year. The winter temperatures in southern Lofoten represent the highest temperature anomaly in the world relative to latitude. However, the winter weather is rather windy.

The polar night occurs from 13 to 29 December and the midnight sun occurs from 28 May to 15 July.

Værøy has a subpolar oceanic climate (Köppen Cfc, Trewartha Eolk) with short, cool summers and long, but not very cold, winters. The all-time low of −9.5 °C (14.9 °F) since recording started in 2005 is extremely mild for a location north of the Arctic Circle, and even milder than the record low for Madrid, Spain or Jacksonville, Florida.

Climate data for Værøy 1991-2020 (precipitation 61-90, extremes 2005-2025)
Month	Jan	Feb	Mar	Apr	May	Jun	Jul	Aug	Sep	Oct	Nov	Dec	Year
Record high °C (°F)	8.9 (48.0)	8.5 (47.3)	8.2 (46.8)	12.5 (54.5)	19 (66)	21.1 (70.0)	22.7 (72.9)	23.1 (73.6)	18.4 (65.1)	15.2 (59.4)	11.4 (52.5)	9.7 (49.5)	23.1 (73.6)
Daily mean °C (°F)	2.3 (36.1)	1.5 (34.7)	1.8 (35.2)	3.5 (38.3)	6.2 (43.2)	9.3 (48.7)	12.2 (54.0)	12.1 (53.8)	10.1 (50.2)	7.1 (44.8)	5 (41)	3.3 (37.9)	6.2 (43.2)
Record low °C (°F)	−8 (18)	−9.5 (14.9)	−7.4 (18.7)	−4.3 (24.3)	−2 (28)	1.5 (34.7)	6.5 (43.7)	4.2 (39.6)	2.5 (36.5)	−3.4 (25.9)	−4.3 (24.3)	−6.5 (20.3)	−9.5 (14.9)
Average precipitation mm (inches)	96 (3.8)	75 (3.0)	74 (2.9)	59 (2.3)	40 (1.6)	43 (1.7)	57 (2.2)	64 (2.5)	98 (3.9)	130 (5.1)	104 (4.1)	110 (4.3)	950 (37.4)
Source: Norwegian Meteorological Institute

== Government ==
Værøy Municipality is responsible for primary education (through 10th grade), outpatient health services, senior citizen services, welfare and other social services, zoning, economic development, and municipal roads and utilities. The municipality is governed by a municipal council of directly elected representatives. The mayor is indirectly elected by a vote of the municipal council. The municipality is under the jurisdiction of the Salten og Lofoten District Court and the Hålogaland Court of Appeal.

=== Municipal council ===
The municipal council (Kommunestyre) of Værøy Municipality is made up of 13 representatives that are elected to four year terms. The tables below show the current and historical composition of the council by political party.

Værøy kommunestyre 2023–2027
Party name (in Norwegian)	Number of representatives
Christian Democratic Party (Kristelig Folkeparti)	2
Værøy List (Værøylista)	7
Common List for Værøy (Felleslista for Værøy)	4
Total number of members:	13

Værøy kommunestyre 2019–2023
Party name (in Norwegian)	Number of representatives
Labour Party (Arbeiderpartiet)	3
Christian Democratic Party (Kristelig Folkeparti)	3
Centre Party (Senterpartiet)	1
Værøy List (Værøylista)	4
Common List for Værøy (Felleslista for Værøy)	2
Total number of members:	13

Værøy kommunestyre 2015–2019
Party name (in Norwegian)	Number of representatives
Labour Party (Arbeiderpartiet)	2
Christian Democratic Party (Kristelig Folkeparti)	3
Værøy List (Værøylista)	3
Common List for Værøy (Felleslista for Værøy)	5
Total number of members:	13

Værøy kommunestyre 2011–2015
Party name (in Norwegian)	Number of representatives
Labour Party (Arbeiderpartiet)	3
Christian Democratic Party (Kristelig Folkeparti)	2
Common List for Værøy (Felleslista for Værøy)	8
Total number of members:	13

Værøy kommunestyre 2007–2011
Party name (in Norwegian)	Number of representatives
Labour Party (Arbeiderpartiet)	5
Christian Democratic Party (Kristelig Folkeparti)	2
Common list for Værøy (Felleslista for Værøy)	6
Total number of members:	13

Værøy kommunestyre 2003–2007
Party name (in Norwegian)	Number of representatives
Labour Party (Arbeiderpartiet)	4
Christian Democratic Party (Kristelig Folkeparti)	2
Common list for Værøy (Felleslista for Værøy)	7
Total number of members:	13

Værøy kommunestyre 1999–2003
Party name (in Norwegian)	Number of representatives
Labour Party (Arbeiderpartiet)	7
Christian Democratic Party (Kristelig Folkeparti)	1
Common list for Værøy (Felleslista for Værøy)	5
Total number of members:	13

Værøy kommunestyre 1995–1999
Party name (in Norwegian)	Number of representatives
Labour Party (Arbeiderpartiet)	5
Christian Democratic Party (Kristelig Folkeparti)	2
Common list for Værøy (Felleslista for Værøy)	6
Total number of members:	13

Værøy kommunestyre 1991–1995
Party name (in Norwegian)	Number of representatives
Labour Party (Arbeiderpartiet)	5
Conservative Party (Høyre)	4
Christian Democratic Party (Kristelig Folkeparti)	2
Socialist Left Party (Sosialistisk Venstreparti)	2
Total number of members:	13

Værøy kommunestyre 1987–1991
Party name (in Norwegian)	Number of representatives
Labour Party (Arbeiderpartiet)	8
Conservative Party (Høyre)	3
Joint list of the Centre Party (Senterpartiet) and the Christian Democratic Party (Kristelig Folkeparti)	2
Total number of members:	13

Værøy kommunestyre 1983–1987
Party name (in Norwegian)	Number of representatives
Labour Party (Arbeiderpartiet)	8
Conservative Party (Høyre)	2
Joint list of the Centre Party (Senterpartiet) and the Christian Democratic Party (Kristelig Folkeparti)	2
Free voters' list (Frie Velgeres lista)	1
Total number of members:	13

Værøy kommunestyre 1979–1983
Party name (in Norwegian)	Number of representatives
Labour Party (Arbeiderpartiet)	7
Joint list of the Conservative Party (Høyre), Christian Democratic Party (Kristelig Folkeparti), and Centre Party (Senterpartiet)	6
Total number of members:	13

Værøy kommunestyre 1975–1979
Party name (in Norwegian)	Number of representatives
Labour Party (Arbeiderpartiet)	7
Cooperation List (Samarbeidsliste)	6
Total number of members:	13

Værøy kommunestyre 1971–1975
Party name (in Norwegian)	Number of representatives
Labour Party (Arbeiderpartiet)	8
Conservative Party (Høyre)	1
Local List(s) (Lokale lister)	4
Total number of members:	13

Værøy kommunestyre 1967–1971
Party name (in Norwegian)	Number of representatives
Labour Party (Arbeiderpartiet)	6
Conservative Party (Høyre)	2
Local List(s) (Lokale lister)	5
Total number of members:	13

Værøy kommunestyre 1963–1967
Party name (in Norwegian)	Number of representatives
Labour Party (Arbeiderpartiet)	5
Conservative Party (Høyre)	1
Christian Democratic Party (Kristelig Folkeparti)	1
Joint List(s) of Non-Socialist Parties (Borgerlige Felleslister)	6
Total number of members:	13

Værøy herredsstyre 1959–1963
Party name (in Norwegian)	Number of representatives
Labour Party (Arbeiderpartiet)	7
Joint List(s) of Non-Socialist Parties (Borgerlige Felleslister)	2
Local List(s) (Lokale lister)	4
Total number of members:	13

Værøy herredsstyre 1955–1959
Party name (in Norwegian)	Number of representatives
Labour Party (Arbeiderpartiet)	9
Local List(s) (Lokale lister)	4
Total number of members:	13

Værøy herredsstyre 1951–1955
Party name (in Norwegian)	Number of representatives
Labour Party (Arbeiderpartiet)	9
Joint List(s) of Non-Socialist Parties (Borgerlige Felleslister)	3
Total number of members:	12

Værøy herredsstyre 1947–1951
Party name (in Norwegian)	Number of representatives
Labour Party (Arbeiderpartiet)	10
Joint List(s) of Non-Socialist Parties (Borgerlige Felleslister)	2
Total number of members:	12

Værøy herredsstyre 1945–1947
Party name (in Norwegian)	Number of representatives
Local List(s) (Lokale lister)	12
Total number of members:	12

Værøy herredsstyre 1937–1941*
Party name (in Norwegian)	Number of representatives
Local List(s) (Lokale lister)	12
Total number of members:	12
Note: Due to the German occupation of Norway during World War II, no elections were held for new municipal councils until after the war ended in 1945.

=== Mayors ===
The mayor (Norwegian: ordfører) of Værøy Municipality is the political leader of the municipality and the chairperson of the municipal council. Here is a list of people who have held this position:

- 1838–1843: Rev. Christian August Grønvold
- 1844–1846: Hans Eriksen
- 1847–1849: Rev. Johan Gløersen
- 1850–1855: Elias Iversen Mostad
- 1856–1856: Arnt Wangberg Raanes
- 1857–1858: Rev. A. Lagaard
- 1859–1862: Arnt Wangberg Raanes
- 1863–1863: Rev. A. Lagaard
- 1864–1867: Ole Raanes
- 1867–1875: Arnt Wangberg Raanes
- 1875–1878: Ole Raanes
- 1879–1881: Ole Benjaminsen
- 1882–1886: Johannes Rønning
- 1887–1887: J. Nordahl
- 1887–1889: Albert Eriksen
- 1889–1893: Hans M. Olsen
- 1893–1919: Johannes Rønning
- 1919–1922: Rev. Wollert Krohn-Hansen
- 1922–1925: Martin Benjaminsen
- 1925–1939: Ludvig Christensen
- 1939–1953: Jacob L. Jacobsen
- 1953–1963: Eilif Pedersen
- 1963–1967: Ole Nylend
- 1967–1969: Willy Arne Wold (Sp)
- 1969–1971: Kristian Fagertun
- 1971–1975: Asmund Analius Berg (Ap)
- 1975–1979: Willy Arne Wold (Sp)
- 1979–1983: Bergiton Solaas (Ap)
- 1983–1987: Asmund Analius Berg (Ap)
- 1987–1991: Bergiton Solaas (Ap)
- 1991–1999: Dag Andreas Sørli (H)
- 1999–2003: Asmund Analius Berg (Ap)
- 2003–2015: Harald Martin Adolfsen (H)
- 2015–2019: Dagfinn Arntsen (KrF)
- 2019–present: Susan Berg Kristiansen (LL)

== Transportation ==
Helicopter transport is available from Bodø at the Værøy Heliport in Sørland. There was airplane service at Værøy Airport, but it was discontinued after the Værøy accident in 1990 in which five people died. The airport was determined to be in a bad position, due to the location next to a mountain and the frequent presence of strong and unpredictable winds, which made takeoffs and landings dangerous. Ferry service is also available from Bodø, Moskenes, and Røst.

== Tourist attractions ==
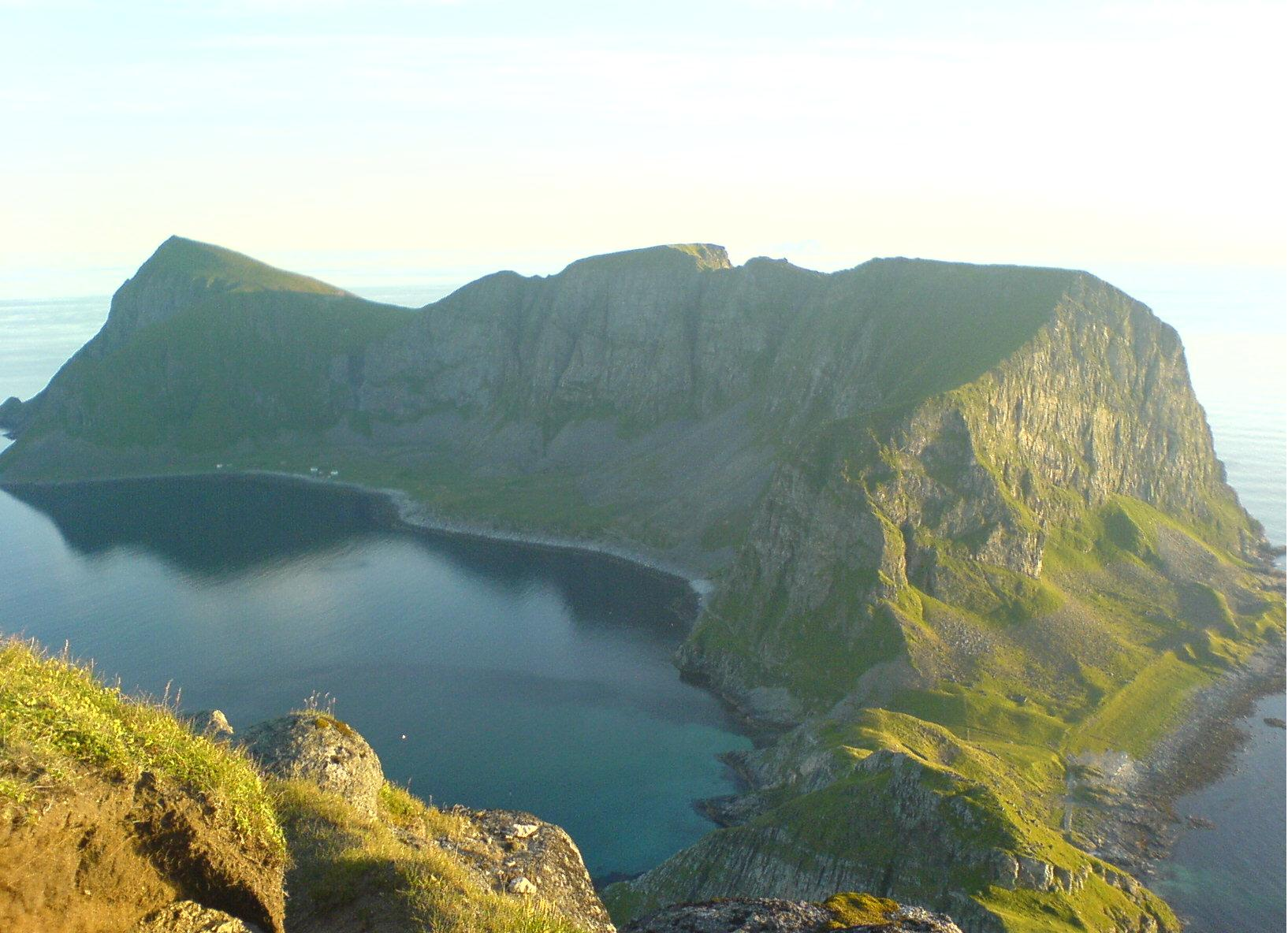
View of the southern part of the island of Værøya, the abandoned village of Mostad is located here

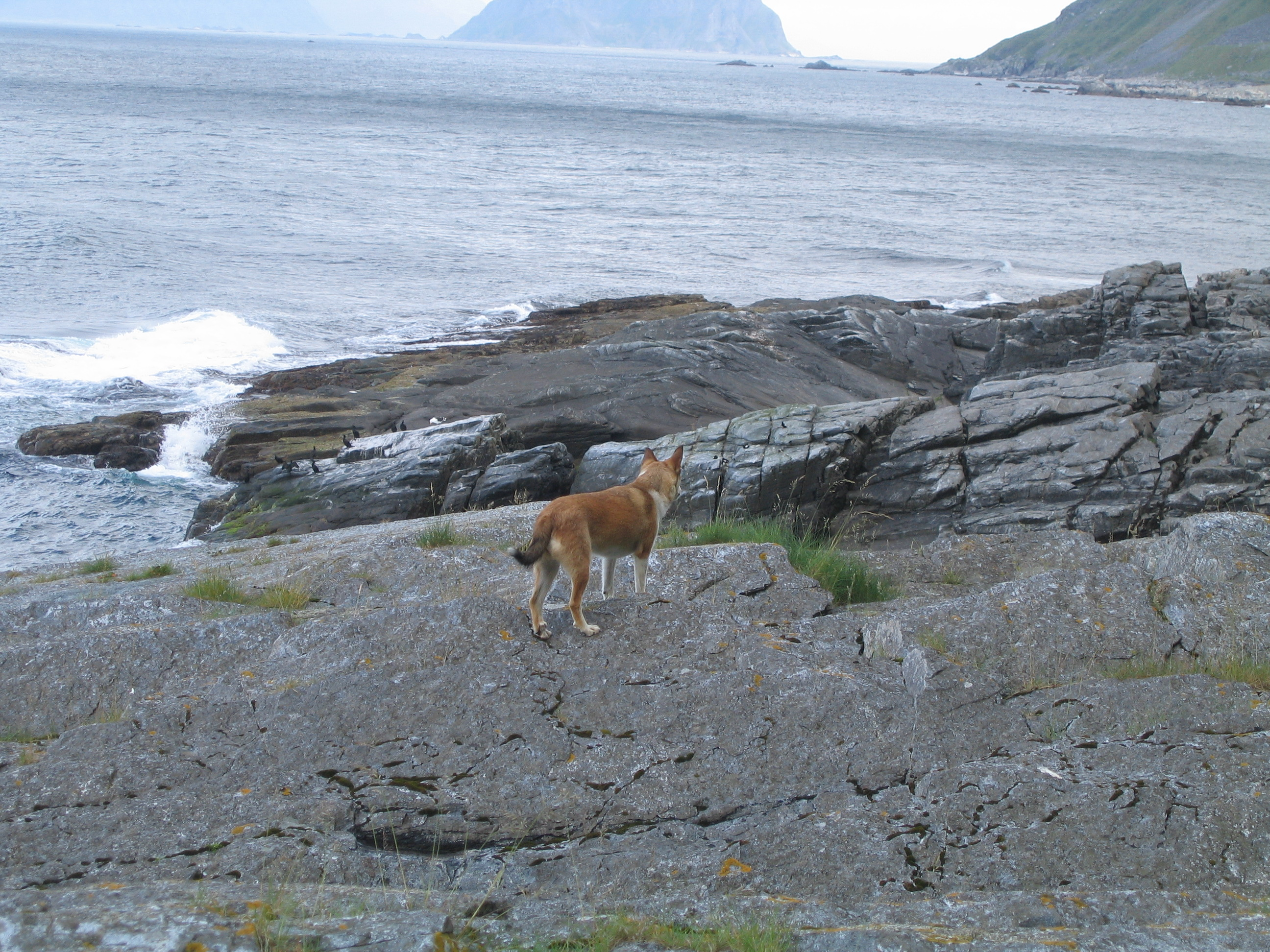
Norwegian Lundehund looking out at the ocean on the north side of the island Værøya. The island on the top, in the middle, is "Mosken"

- Sportfishing for cod, coalfish, and halibut is practised here.
- Turstien is a floodlit pedestrian thoroughfare which was opened in 1999. The surface is suitable for walking, bicycles, prams, wheelchairs, and more.
- Breivika is situated on the road between Sørland and Nordland, and is the location of the Skarsursanden beach. From the main road, a signposted path leads up to Breivikdalen.
- Heia has views of the island, which can be reached via a step path called Bjørka, or by following the tarred road up Rømdalen. About halfway, there is an old eagle trapping site.
- Eagle trapping is a tradition unique to the ancient Værøy islanders, who caught eagles with their bare hands. Ancient sites can still be seen, at Rømdalen.
- Gjerdeheia forms a vast and completely flat plateau on top. It can be reached from Breiviksdalen by turning left at the end of the valley, or following the path going up Rømdalen and turning right before passing Hornet.
- Nordlandsnupen is Værøy's highest mountain. One must reach it by walking up Breiviksdalen and turning right at the end of the valley.
- Mollbakken, in Nordland, consists of smoothly-ground, round stones. Here, many burial sites from the Viking Age have been excavated.
- Old Værøy Church, in the village of Nordland, is the oldest church in Lofoten, built circa 1740. The altarpiece dates back to ca. 1714 and features alabaster figures made in England in 1430.
- Nordlandshagen (the Garden of Nordland) is a popular area for outdoor recreation. The midnight sun can be seen clearly here, from 30 May to 13 July.
- Måstad is located in the south. The mountainside, more or less, hangs right over the old, abandoned village of Måstad. This is where the Lundehund, or puffin dog, breed originated. Oftentimes, people will walk here from Nordlandshagen.
- The Norwegian Lundehund, or "Puffin dog", is a small- to medium-sized Spitz-like dog. It is one of Norway's seven native breeds of domestic canine, and one of the rarest. It has an extra toe and is naturally very agile, flexible and limber, as these dogs were originally bred solely for the puffin hunt, which required them to stealthily maneuver on slippery rock faces and steep and narrow cliffsides. As the hunting of puffins was of such great importance to the islanders, the Lundehund's stronghold has traditionally been on Værøy.
- Sanden is a beach with a 400-metre (1,300 ft) tall rock face behind it, making it incredibly warm on fine summer days. Access is only by boat.

== In literature ==
- The island of "Vurrgh" in Edgar Allan Poe's story A Descent into the Maelström (1841) is Værøya.

== Notable people ==
- Willy Arne Wold (1929 in Værøy – 1996), a Norwegian politician who was twice Mayor of Værøy in 1960s & 1970s
- Bernhard-Jens Eggesbø (born 1931 in Værøy), a Norwegian military officer and civil servant who worked for NATO
- Guri Ingebrigtsen (1952 in Værøy – 2020), a Norwegian politician who was Mayor of Vestvågøy Municipality from 1999 to 2007
