= Værøya =

Island in Værøy municipality, Norway

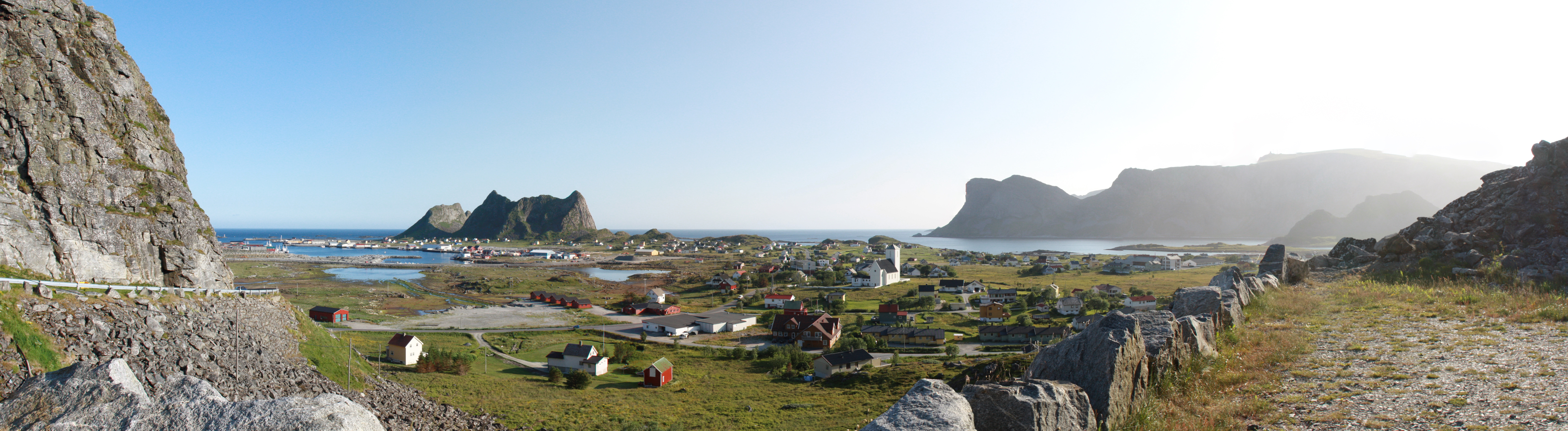
- Interactive map of Værøya

Geography
- Location: Nordland, Norway
- Coordinates: 67.6778°N 12.6640°E
- Archipelago: Lofoten
- Area: 15.7 km^{2} (6.1 sq mi)
- Length: 9.4 km (5.84 mi)
- Width: 5 km (3.1 mi)
- Highest elevation: 450 m (1480 ft)
- Highest point: Nordlandsnupen

Administration
- Norway
- County: Nordland
- Municipality: Værøy Municipality

Værøya or Værøy is an island in Værøy Municipality in Nordland county, Norway. The 15.7-square-kilometre (6.1 sq mi) island makes up about 89% of the land area of the whole municipality and it is home to 100% of the municipal residents.

== Name ==
The Old Norse form of the island's name was Veðrøy. The first element is the word veðr which means "weather" (here referring to harsh weather and the exposed and unsheltered position of the island). The last element is øy which means "island". Historically, the name was spelled Værø, using a Danish spelling. On 6 January 1908, a royal resolution changed the spelling of the name of the municipality to Værøy. Now the spelling uses an -a suffix for -øya which is the Norwegian word for "the island".

== Geography ==
The island lies at the southern of the Lofoten archipelago, between the islands of Røstlandet and Moskenesøya. The small, uninhabited island of Mosken lies a short distance north of Værøya. The Moskenstraumen strait lies to the north of the island, the Vestfjorden lies to the east, and the Norwegian Sea is to the west. The highest point on the island is the 450-metre (1,480 ft) tall mountain Nordlandsnupen.

The island has two villages on it: Nordland (on the northern edge of the island) and Sørland (on the southeastern peninsula). About 95% of the island's residents live in Sørland, which is also the administrative centre of the municipality. There is also the old (now abandoned) village of Mostad on the southern part of the island. The Værøy Church and Old Værøy Church are both located on the island.

== History ==
The Norwegian Lundehund was a dog used in Værøya to hunt puffins on the narrow cliffs on the island. The dog breed nearly went extinct in the 20th century, but a few dogs remained and the breed has since made a comeback.

== Important Bird Area ==
An 840 hectares (2,100 acres) area consisting of vertical cliffs and steep grassy slopes on the south-west peninsula of the island, along with the Måstadfjellet nature reserve and adjacent marine waters, has been designated an Important Bird Area (IBA) by BirdLife International because it supports large breeding colonies of about 40,000 pairs of Atlantic puffins and 15,000 to 20,000 pairs of black-legged kittiwakes.

== Media gallery ==
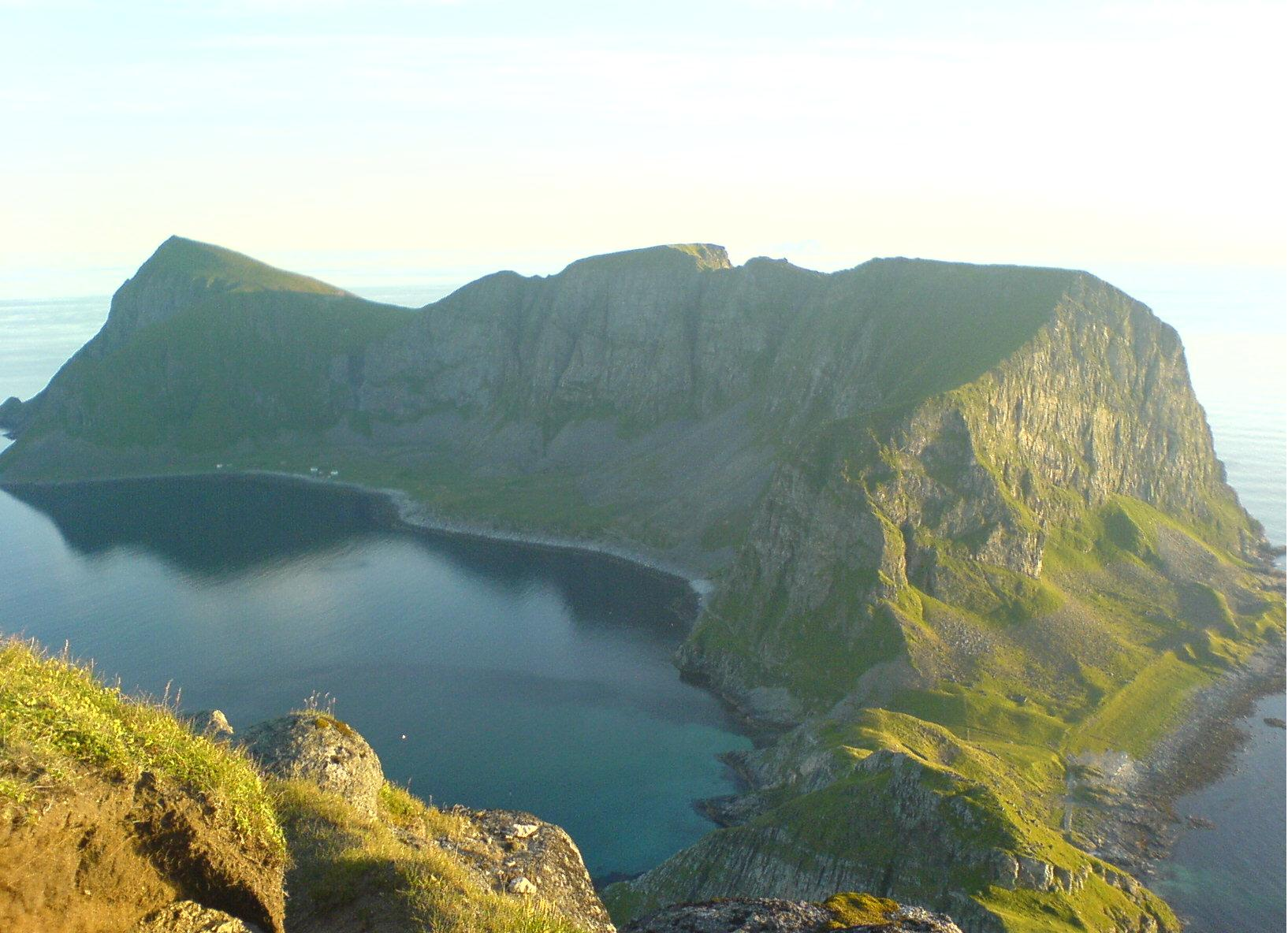

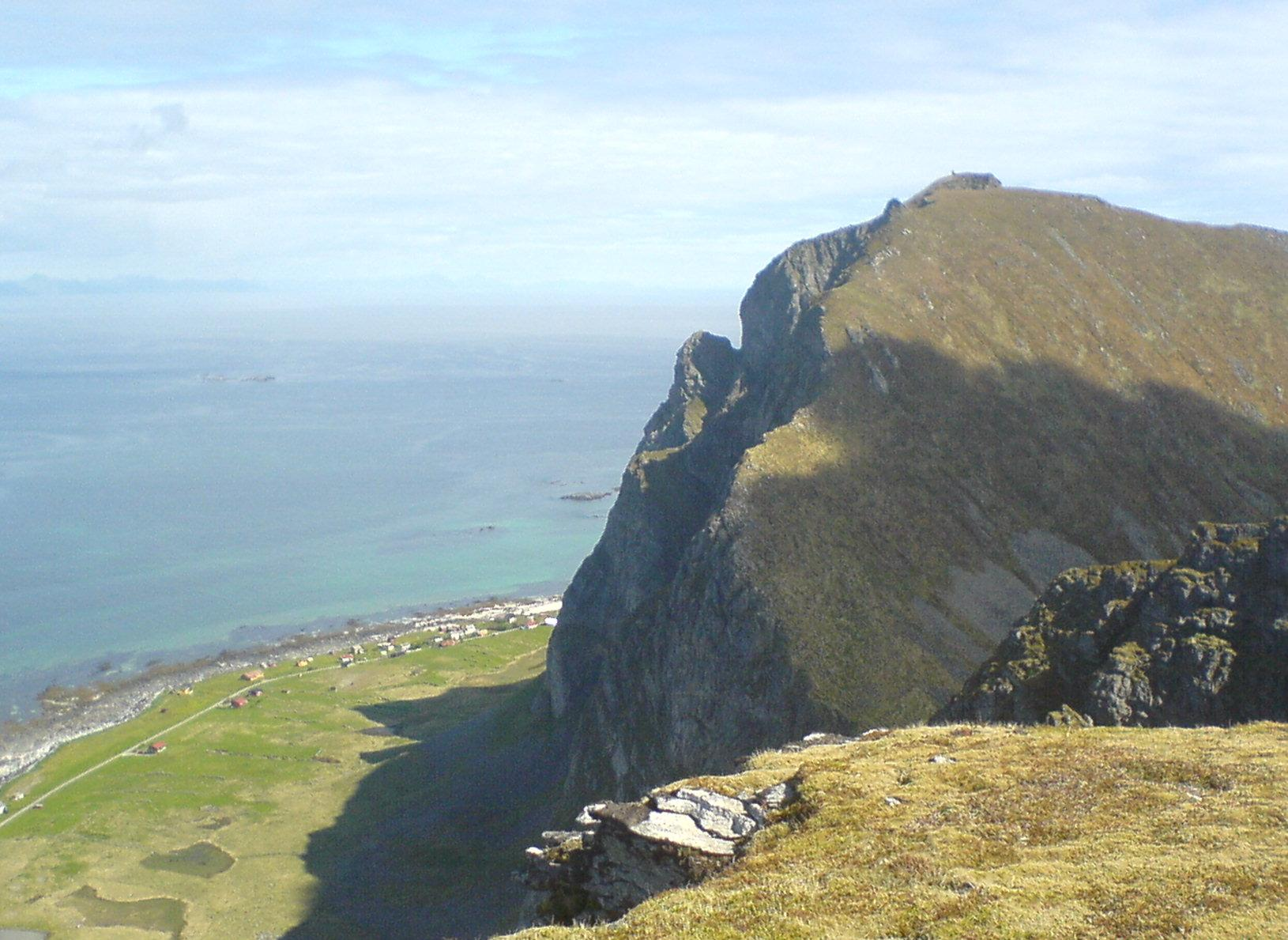

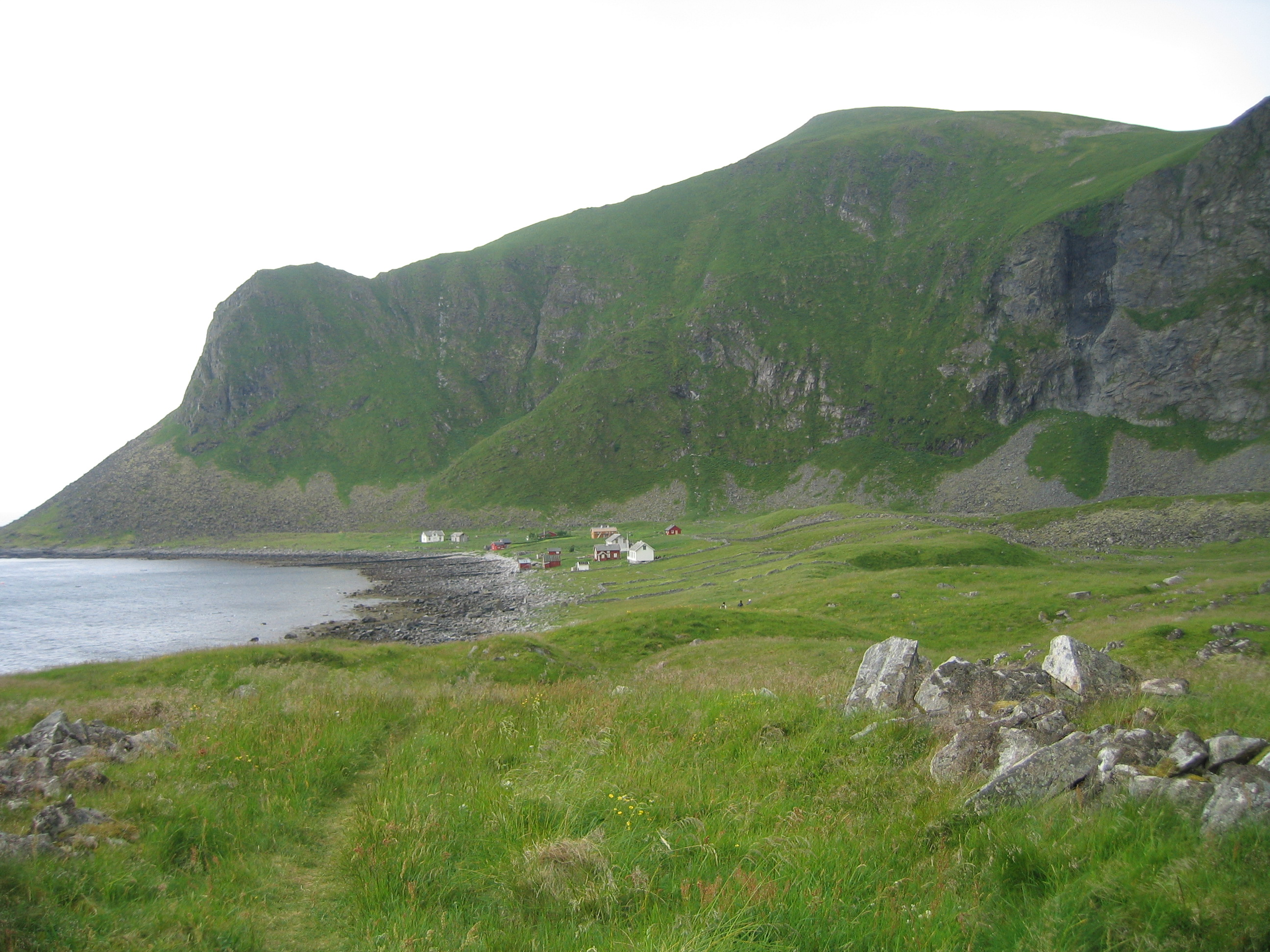

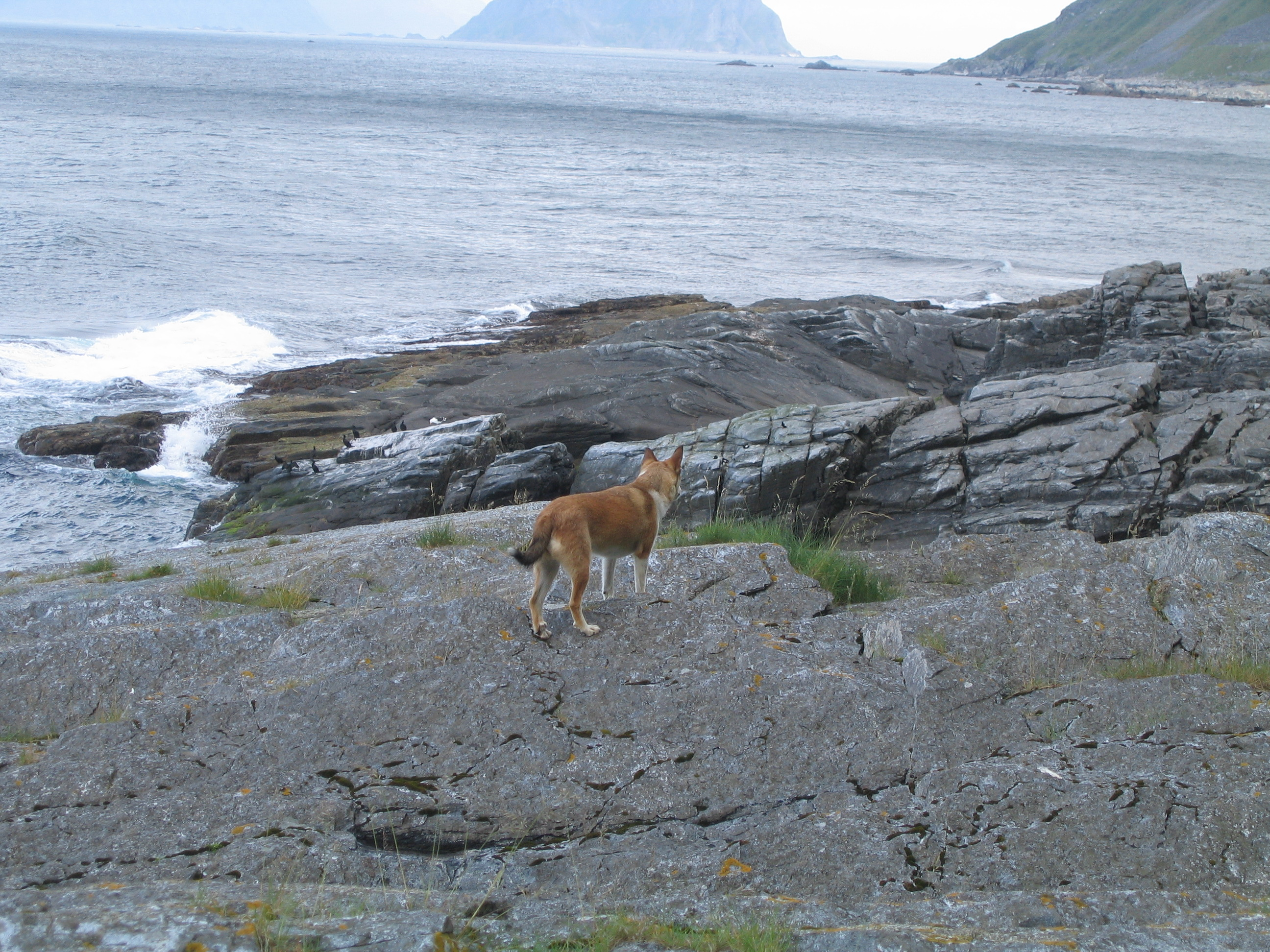

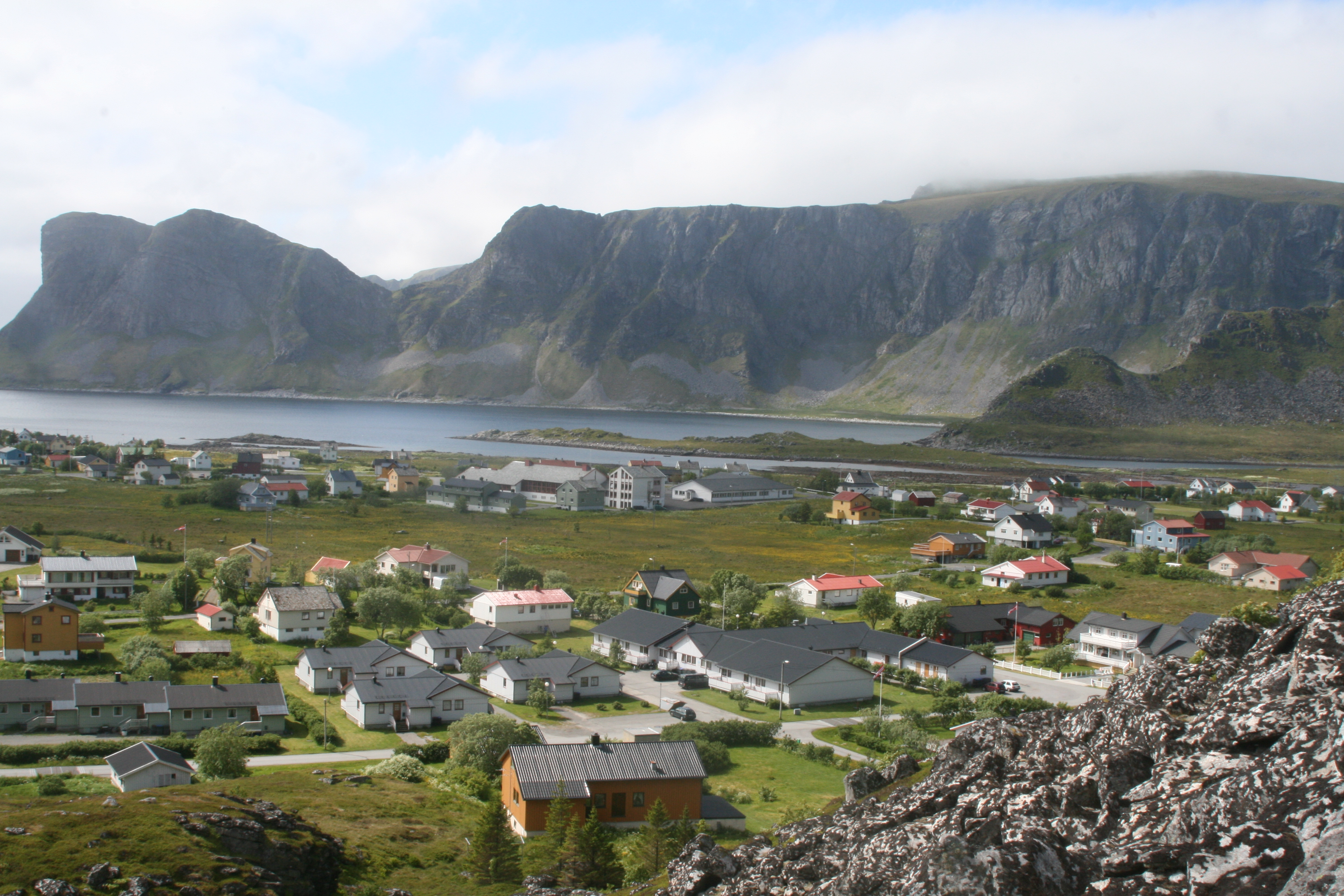

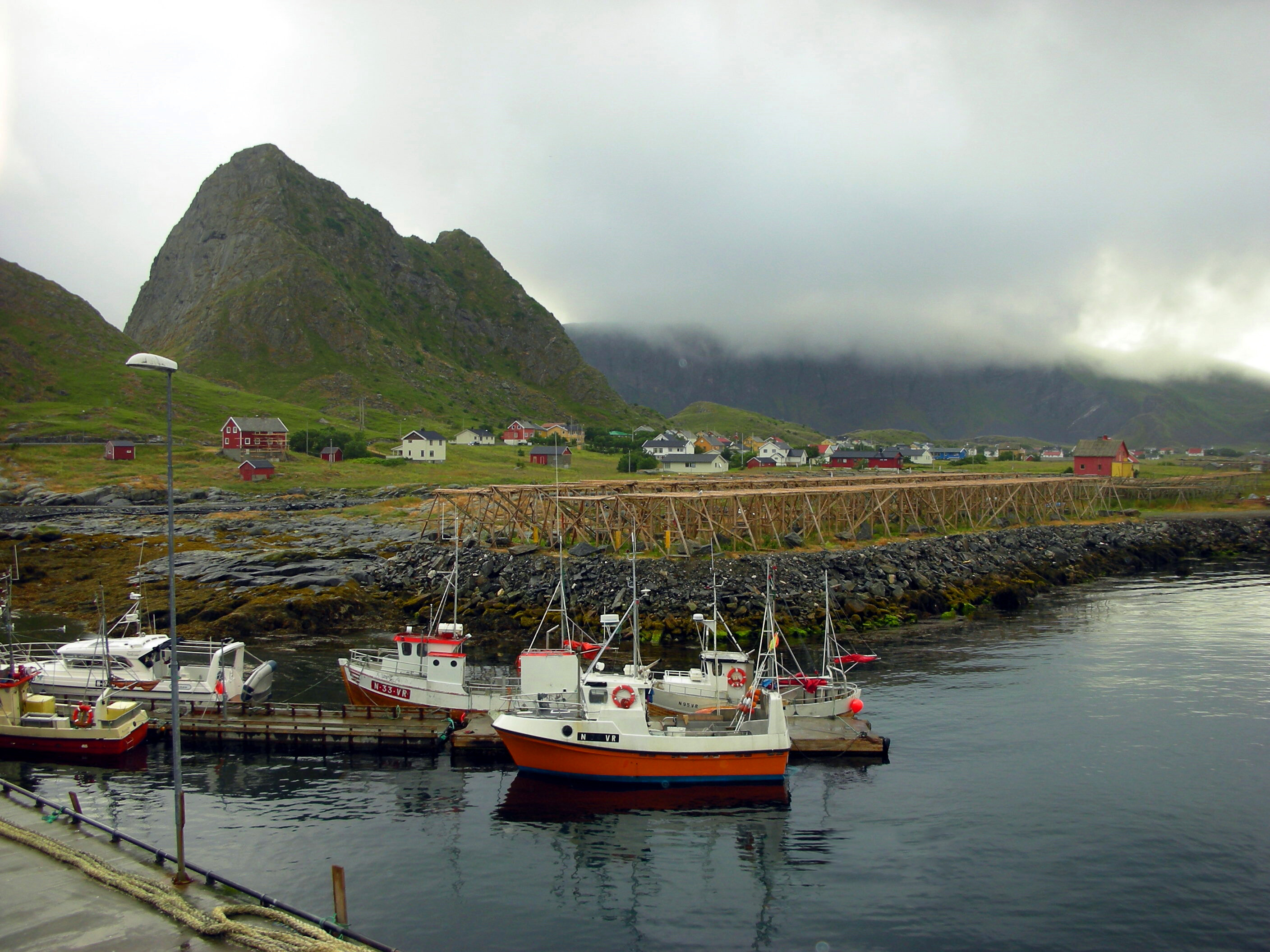

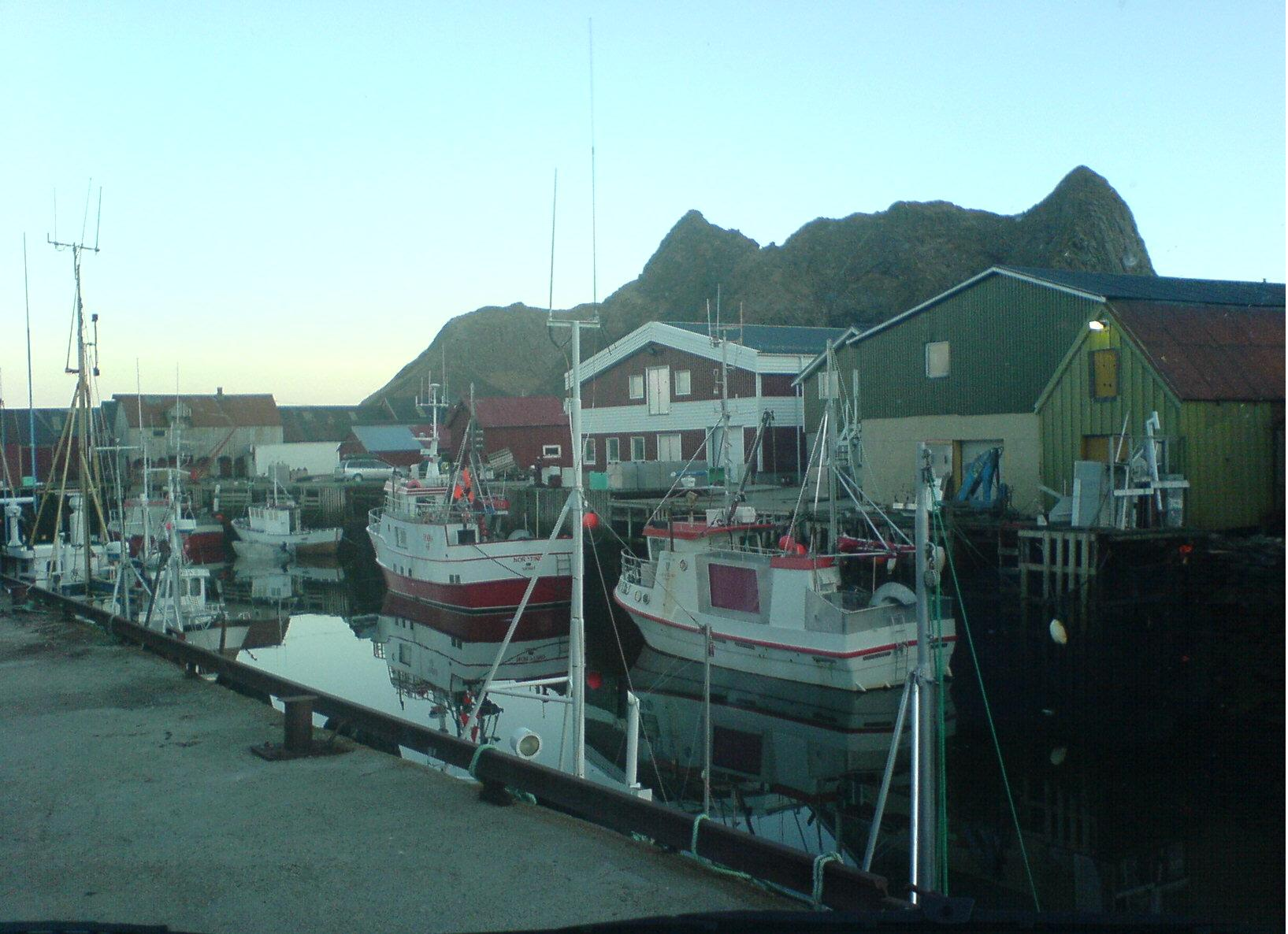

== See also ==
- List of islands of Norway
