= List of aviation accidents and incidents in Norway =

The list includes in a chronological order all aviation accidents and incidents involving airliners in Norway that result in a write-off or fatalities, as well as all hijackings. Helicopter accidents are only included for multi-engined aircraft with fatalities. Military accidents are only included if they have fatalities. The list excludes all accidents during wartime involving military aircraft, which specifically includes the period 8 April 1940 to 8 May 1945. The location denotes current municipalities, which may differ from municipal borders at the time of the accident. Fatalities include people on the ground and people who die within thirty days because of injuries sustained from the accident.

†	Hijacking
††	Placeholder
*	Military

Aviation accidents and incidents in Norway
Date	Location	Aircraft	Airline	Fat.	Description	Ref(s)
16 June 1936	Lihesten, Hyllestad Municipality	Junkers Ju 52	Norwegian Air Lines	7		
1 March 1941	Hommelvik, Malvik Municipality	Junkers Ju 52	Deutsche Luft Hansa	3		
16 October 1944	Hestnutan, Seljord Municipality	Junkers Ju 52	Deutsche Luft Hansa	15		
10 May 1945	Oslo Airport, Gardermoen, Ullensaker Municipality	Short Stirling	Royal Air Force	20		
10 May 1945	Sørkedalen, Oslo Municipality	Short Stirling	Royal Air Force	24		
18 December 1945	Voksenkollen, Oslo Municipality	Douglas C-47 Skytrain	Royal Canadian Air Force	17		
4 January 1946	Sirdal Municipality	Consolidated B-24 Liberator	Royal Air Force	8		
22 May 1946	Snarøya, Bærum Municipality	Junkers Ju 52	Norwegian Air Lines	8		
22 May 1946	Mistberget, Eidsvoll Municipality	Douglas DC-3	British European Airways	3		
28 August 1947	Lødingen Municipality	Short Sandringham	Norwegian Air Lines	35		
6 September 1948	Førdesveten, Sund Municipality	Consolidated PBY Catalina	Royal Norwegian Air Force	13		
2 October 1948	Hommelvik, Malvik Municipality	Short Sandringham	Norwegian Air Lines	19		
20 November 1949	Hurum Municipality	Douglas C-47 Skytrain	Aero Holland	34		
15 May 1950	Harstad Municipality	Short Sandringham	Norwegian Air Lines	0		
5 May 1952	Siljefjell, Drangedal Municipality	Douglas C-47 Skytrain	Fred. Olsen Airtransport	11		
10 July 1953	Sola Air Station, Sola Municipality	Douglas C-47 Skytrain; Republic F-84 Thunderjet	United States Air Force; Royal Norwegian Air Force	11		
28 March 1954	Bjørnøya, Svalbard	Consolidated PBY Catalina	Royal Norwegian Air Force	8		
5 May 1956	Hummelfjell, Tolga Municipality	de Havilland Heron	Braathens SAFE	2		
2 December 1959	Hakkloa, Oslo Municipality	Douglas C-47 Skytrain	United States Air Force	4		
9 September 1961	Holta, Strand Municipality	Vickers Viking	Eagle Airways	39		
14 April 1963	Oslo Airport, Fornebu, Bærum Municipality	Vickers Viscount	Iceland Airways	12		
5 March 1964	Oslo Airport, Fornebu, Bærum Municipality	Douglas C-47 Skytrain	Widerøe	0		
20 March 1966	Svanfjell, Tranøy Municipality	Lockheed C-130 Hercules	United States Air Force	7		
31 August 1967	Prins Karls Forland, Svalbard	Breguet Atlantic	French Navy	11		
28 March 1968	Rossfjordstraumen, Lenvik Municipality	de Havilland Canada Otter	Widerøe	0		
31 August 1968	Odda Municipality	de Havilland Canada Otter	Westwing	5		
4 September 1968	Bodø Municipality	de Havilland Heron	Nor Flyselskap	5		
11 July 1972	Grytøy, Harstad Municipality	de Havilland Canada Twin Otter	Royal Norwegian Air Force	17		
23 December 1972	Asker Municipality	Fokker F-28 Fellowship	Braathens SAFE	40		
30 January 1973	Oslo Airport, Fornebu, Bærum Municipality	McDonnell Douglas DC-9-21	Scandinavian Airlines System	0		
17 July 1973	Tromsø Airport, Tromsø Municipality	Convair CV-640	SATA Air Açores	0		
23 November 1977	North Sea	Sikorsky S-61	Helikopter Service	12		
26 June 1978	North Sea	Sikorsky S-61	Helikopter Service	18		
28 August 1978	Hopen, Svalbard	Tupolev Tu-16	Soviet Air Forces	7		
11 March 1982	Gamvik Municipality	de Havilland Canada Twin Otter	Widerøe	15		
17 February 1983	Båtsfjord Airport, Båtsfjord Municipality	Britten-Norman Islander	Norving	0		
21 June 1985	Oslo Airport, Fornebu, Bærum Municipality	Boeing 737-200	Braathens SAFE	0	Hijacking	
10 November 1986	Kristinvann, Bodø Municipality	Westland Sea King	Royal Norwegian Air Force	1		
23 January 1987	Trondheim Airport, Stjørdal Municipality	McDonnell Douglas DC-9-41	Scandinavian Airlines System	0		
6 May 1988	Torghatten near Brønnøysund Airport, Brønnøy Municipality	de Havilland Canada Dash 7	Widerøe	36		
12 April 1990	Værøy Airport, Værøy Municipality	de Havilland Canada Twin Otter	Widerøe	5		
3 October 1990	Alden, Askvoll Municipality	Bell 212	Helikopter Service	5		
29 October 1990	Honningsvåg Airport, Nordkapp Municipality	de Havilland Canada Twin Otter	Royal Norwegian Air Force	3		
21 March 1991	Pyramiden, Svalbard	Mil Mi-8	Aeroflot	1		
15 September 1993	Oslo Airport, Gardermoen, Ullensaker Municipality	Tupolev Tu-134	Aeroflot	0	Hijacking	
27 October 1993	Overhalla Municipality near Namsos Airport, Høknesøra	de Havilland Canada Twin Otter	Widerøe	6		
3 November 1994	Oslo Airport, Gardermoen, Ullensaker Municipality	McDonnell Douglas MD-82	Scandinavian Airlines System	0	Hijacking	
4 December 1994	Oslo Airport, Gardermoen, Ullensaker Municipality	Cessna Grand Caravan	Air Team	1		
18 March 1996	Wijdefjorden, Svalbard	Eurocopter Super Puma	Airlift	1		
29 August 1996	Operafjellet near Svalbard Airport, Longyear	Tupolev Tu-154	Vnukovo Airlines	141		
6 September 1996	Oslo Airport, Gardermoen, Ullensaker Municipality	Tupolev Tu-154	Hemus Air	0	Hijacking	
8 September 1997	Norwegian Sea near the Norne oil field	Eurocopter Super Puma	Helikopter Service	12		
12 October 1998	Stord Airport, Stord Municipality	Cessna 402	Jetair	9		
30 November 2001	Skien Airport, Geiteryggen	British Aerospace Jetstream 31	European Executive Express	0		
29 September 2004	Bodø Airport, Bodø Municipality	Dornier 228	Kato Air	0		
1 May 2005	Hammerfest Airport, Hammerfest Municipality	de Havilland Canada Dash 8-100	Widerøe	0		
10 October 2006	Stord Airport, Stord Municipality	British Aerospace 146	Atlantic Airways	4		
30 March 2008	Barentsburg Heliport, Heerodden, Svalbard	Mil Mi-8	Spark+	3		
2 March 2011	Oslo Airport, Gardermoen, Ullensaker Municipality	Swearingen Metroliner	North Flying	0		
14 January 2014	Sollihøgda, Hole Municipality	Eurocopter EC-135	Norwegian Air Ambulance	2		
29 April 2016	Turøy, Øygarden Municipality	Eurocopter EC225 Super Puma	CHC Helikopter Service	13		
19 March 2022	Gråtådalen, Beiarn Municipality	V-22 Osprey	United States Air Force	4		
29 December 2024	Sandefjord Airport, Sandefjord Municipality	Boeing 737-800	KLM Royal Dutch Airlines	0		
