= Widerøe Flight 710 =

1988 aviation accident in Norway

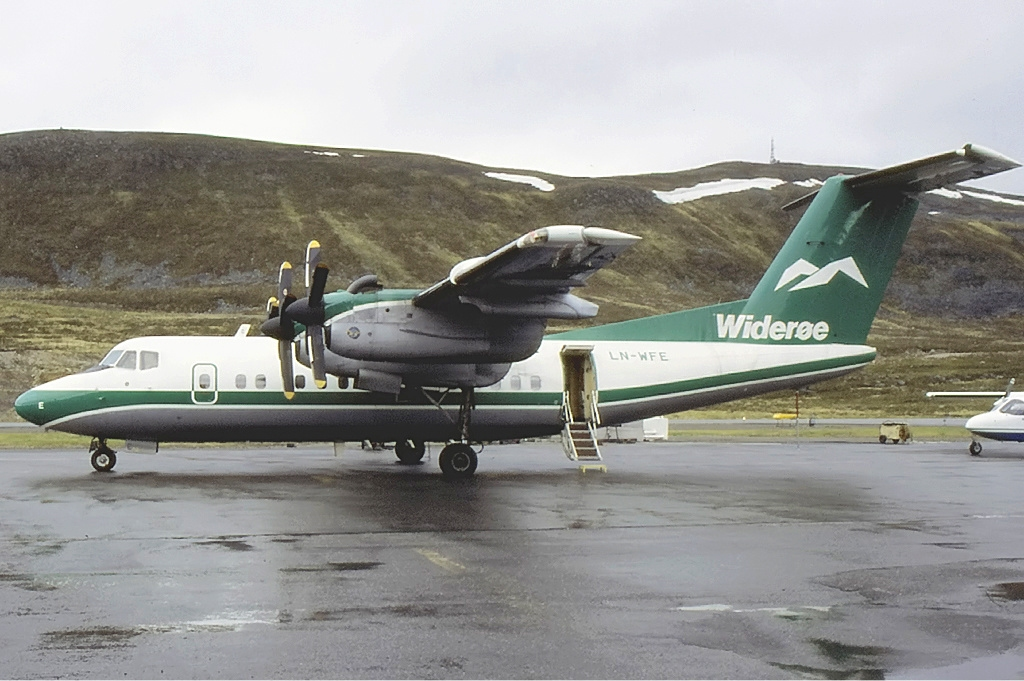
- A sister Dash 7 aircraft at Hammerfest Airport in 1987

Accident
- Date: 6 May 1988
- Summary: Controlled flight into terrain caused by pilot error and fog
- Site: Torghatten, Brønnøy Municipality, Norway; 65°23′36″N 12°05′12″E

Aircraft
- Aircraft type: de Havilland Canada Dash 7 Series 102
- Operator: Widerøe
- Registration: LN-WFN
- Flight origin: Trondheim Airport
- Last stopover: Namsos Airport
- Destination: Bodø Airport via Brønnøysund Airport and Sandnessjøen Airport
- Occupants: 36
- Passengers: 33
- Crew: 3
- Fatalities: 36
- Survivors: 0

Widerøe Flight 710, also known as the Torghatten Accident (Norwegian: Torghatten-ulykken), was a controlled flight into terrain into the mountain of Torghatten in Brønnøy Municipality, Norway. The Widerøe-operated de Havilland Canada Dash 7 crashed on 6 May 1988 at 20:29:30 during approach to Brønnøysund Airport. All thirty-six people on board LN-WFN were killed; the crash remains the deadliest accident involving the Dash 7 and the deadliest in Northern Norway. The direct cause of the accident was that the aircraft had descended from 500 to 170 meters (1,640 to 560 ft) at 8 NM (15 km; 9.2 mi) instead of 4 NM (7.4 km; 4.6 mi) from the airport.

An investigation found several shortcomings in the airline's operating procedures, in particular lack of proper cockpit communication and mutual control of the descent and approach plans. This was in part caused by the airline electing to not follow the sterile cockpit rule and that a passenger was sitting in a cockpit jump seat during the flight. The investigating commission also found lack of proper pilot training in the airline. Flight 710 was the second of four Widerøe accidents between 1982 and 1993, all of which revealed shortcomings in the airline's operations and internal control.

== Aircraft ==
The accident aircraft was a four-engine de Havilland Canada DHC-7 Dash 7 Series 102, with serial number 28, built in 1980. It was bought used by Widerøe in 1985 and registered as LN-WFN on 8 November 1985. Its certificate of airworthiness was last renewed on 4 November 1987 and was valid until 30 November 1988. The aircraft had operated 16,934 hours and 32,347 cycles prior to its last flight. The last A-check took place on 15 April 1988, after which the aircraft had flown 147 hours and 30 cycles.

== Flight deck crew ==
The captain was 58-year-old Bjørn Hanssen, a resident of Bodø Municipality. He held a D-certificate issued on 8 April 1981, which was last renewed on 11 December 1987. He took his initial license in 1949 and had worked as a pilot for Widerøe since 1 April 1960. At the time of his last renewal, he had flown 19,886 hours, of which 2,849 hours were with the Dash 7. He had completed periodical flight training with the Dash 7 on 8 March 1988. He had just returned to Norway following a six-week vacation in Spain.

The first officer was 31-year-old Johannes Andal, a resident of Bømlo Municipality. He held a C-certificate, which limited him to being first officer on the Dash 7. The certificate was issued on 5 January 1987, and had been valid for the Dash 7 since 23 February 1988. He had started his flight training in 1977 and had completed it in the United States in 1979. He was hired as a pilot for Widerøe on 6 February 1986, originally serving on the de Havilland Canada DHC-6 Twin Otter. He was checked out as first officer on the Dash 7 in February 1988. He had a total flight time of 6,458 hours, of which 85 were on the Dash 7. The flight attendant was 28 years old and had worked for Widerøe since 1983.

== Flight ==
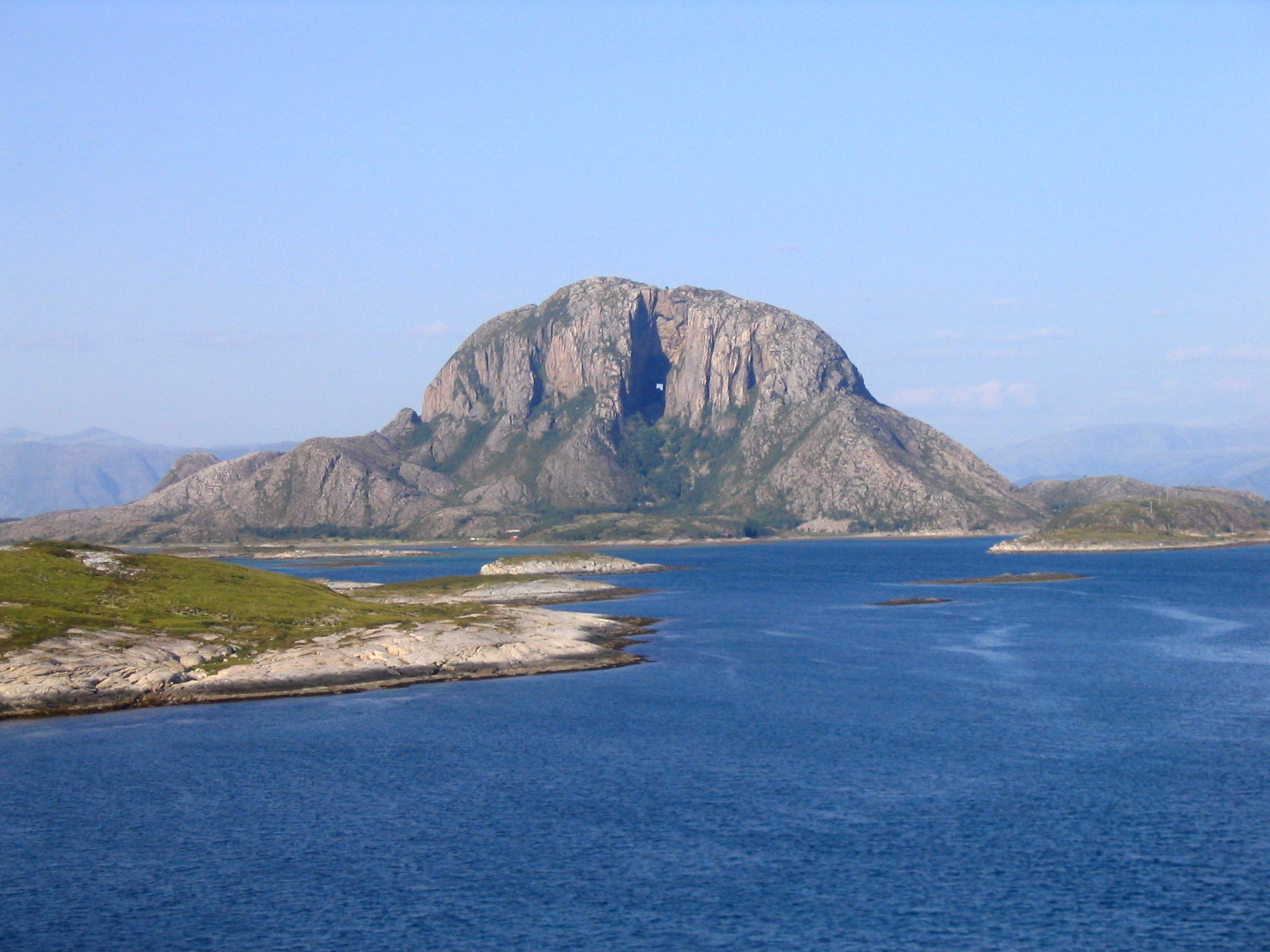
Torghatten, the site of the accident

The aircraft had been used during the morning of 6 May on a multi-leg flight from Bodø to Trondheim and back. It had then flown back to Trondheim where it changed crew. They had arrived at Trondheim with a flight at 18:50 on 5 May and left the hotel in Trondheim at 16:15 on 6 May. Flight 710 was scheduled to fly from Trondheim via Namsos; Brønnøysund; and Sandnessjøen. It departed Værnes after a 90-minute delay at 19:23 due to technical problems with another aircraft. Flight 710 had a crew of three: a captain, a first officer and a flight attendant. The aircraft was packed and therefore a jump seat in the cockpit had to be used by a passenger, bringing the number of people on board to 52.

The aircraft made a stop-over at Namsos where sixteen passengers disembarked, reducing the number of passengers on board to thirty-three. The captain was the pilot flying for the segment, and the passenger occupying the jump seat remained in the cockpit. The aircraft departed Namsos at 20:07 and received permission from Trondheim ATCC at 20:13 to ascend to flight level 90 (FL 90). During the flight, the passenger in the jump seat held a conversation with the captain and asked several questions regarding the operations. The first officer did not participate in this discussion, and it was he who conducted radio contact with air traffic control and the airline's operations center.

The first officer contacted the airline at 20:16 and informed that they expected to arrive at 20:32. At 20:20:29, the aircraft asked permission from Trondheim ATCC to switch to Brønnøysund Aerodrome Flight Information Service (AFIS), which was granted. The aircraft announced at 20:20:42 that they would start the descent and would switch to Brønnøysund AFIS. Contact was made at 20:22:34, at which time the aircraft announced it was 25 NM (46 km; 29 mi) from the airport and at FL 80. AFIS informed that there were no known aircraft in the area and that runway 22 was in use; wind was 5 kn (9 km/h; 6 mph) from southeast, 5 nautical miles (9.3 kilometres; 5.8 miles) visibility, a light shower and 6 °C (43 °F). At 20:23:22 the first officer held a 62-second conversation with the airline ordering a taxi for one of the passengers so he could reach his connecting ferry.

The captain asked for the descent checklist at 20:24:24. The fasten seat belt sign was switched on and the flight attendant started the process of preparing the cabin for landing. At 20:24:46 the captain, as part of the checklist, informed the first officer that they would go down to 1,500 ft (460 m) at Torghatten and then down to 550 ft (170 m). This was followed first by a partially inaudible conversation between the captain and the first officers, which included if they were to fill fuel, and then an inaudible conversation between the captain and the jump seat passenger. The direction of the VHF omnidirectional radio range (VOR) and distance measuring equipment (DME) at Brønnøysund was checked at 20:26:37.

The approach checklist was started at 20:27:01, at which time the aircraft's altitude reached 500 m (1,600 ft). The first point on the checklist was not readable, but the last three were. At 20:27:32 the captain asked for flaps and landing gear, which were immediately deployed by the first officer and resulted in the aircraft gaining 70 m (230 ft) of altitude. The landing gears were confirmed locked at 20:28:00. Four seconds later the passenger asked the captain if there were reserve systems which could be used if the landing gear did not deploy properly. At this point the aircraft started the descent from 500 m (1,600 ft).

AFIS asked for the aircraft's position at 20:28:10, and the first officer responded at 20:28:13 that it was 8 NM (15 km; 9 mi) away. He asked AFIS for a wind check, and AFIS responded that it was from 220 degrees and 8 kn (15 km/h; 9 mph). The first officer confirmed the information at 20:28:24. The aircraft reached 170 m (560 ft) altitude and remained at that height for the rest of the flight. A short conversation was initiated by the passenger at 20:28:55. Three seconds later, the captain asked for "25 degrees flaps and props fully fine". This was confirmed by the first officer two seconds later. The pre-landing checklist was completed between 20:29:04 and :19.

The autopilot had been used since 25 seconds after take-off from Namsos and was used for the remainder of the flight. From 20:29:21 all four engines showed increasing torque and immediately before the crash the aircraft had shifted its angle from −2.5 degrees to 5 degrees. At 20:29:29 the ground proximity warning system showed 'minimum'. The aircraft crashed into the western side of Torghatten at 20:29:30 at 170 meters (560 feet) elevation.

The aircraft flew into the mountain at an angle of 15 to 20 degrees, with the starboard side towards the mountain. The aircraft was ascending at a seven-degree angle, plus/minus one degree. The tip of the starboard wing was the first to hit the mountain, followed by engine number four (the right-most). The engine was immediately torn off and the aircraft started to rotate. The aircraft started being torn in the back rib of the starboard wing. Then the nose and port wing from engine number two (the inner) hit a depression in the mountain-face, causing engine number one to loosen from its nacelle and the port wing to break between the engines. At the same time the aircraft's body was broken in two. The aircraft's forward movement stopped, the wreck pieces rotated with the vertical stabilizer away from the mountain-side, the port wing caught on fire and exploded and the rest of the aircraft fell down the slope. On the way down, the starboard wing caught on fire.

== Salvage ==
The aircraft crashed into Torghatten, which is located 5 NM (9 km; 6 mi) south-west of Brønnøysund Airport. The mountain is 271 metres (889 feet) tall and is a distinct height in an area which is otherwise rather flat. The aircraft hit the western side of the mountain at a point where the terrain is forty degrees steep. The center line of the flight path is 800 m (2,600 ft) from Torghatten. The wreck was spread over an area 60 to 100 m (200 to 330 ft) below the point of impact.

AFIS made several attempts to call up the aircraft. It received a call from a resident close to Torghatten which said they had heard aircraft noise followed by a crash. Brønnøysund Fire Department and an ambulance helicopter with a doctor was dispatched to Torghatten. The rescue work was made difficult by low clouds, small fires and explosions. The terrain was difficult and the lack of daylight made assisting the situation difficult. A helicopter with medical personnel and the airport direct arrived at 21:25, while a meeting place for the next of kin was established at the airport. At 23:30 the police stated that there was no hope of finding survivors and the scene changed from a search to an investigation scene. Due to the fog it was not possible to verify that all people had been killed until the next day. Seventy-five soldiers from the Home Guard participated in the salvage.

== Investigation ==
The Accident Investigation Board Norway was informed about the accident at 21:10. Four members of the investigation commission were appointed, consisting of leader Lieutenant General Wilhelm Mohr, Pilot Hallvard Vikholt, Lieutenant Colonel Asbjørn Stein and Chief-of-Police Arnstein Øverkil. Because of poor weather conditions, the commission was not assembled in Brønnøy until 15:00 on 7 May. The same day the National Criminal Investigation Service arrived to assist AIBN. Six people appointed by the Canadian Aviation Safety Board, including representatives from de Havilland Canada and Pratt & Whitney Canada, were sent to aid the investigation. Four representatives from Widerøe were available for consultation with the commission. The investigation commission was later supplemented by psychologist Grethe Myhre and Øverkil replaced by Arne Huuse.

The VOR/DME system was tested by the Civil Aviation Administration of Norway on 7 May and found to be working correctly. AIBN established a base of operations at the hangar at Brønnøysund Airport and used a helicopter to freight the pieces of the wreck there and bodies to Trondheim University Hospital for identification. Technical investigations started on 9 May. The aircraft was equipped with a flight data recorder and a cockpit voice recorder. Both were found intact and were decoded at the Air Accidents Investigation Branch in the United Kingdom. Improper use of the microphone made it difficult to hear the captain's voice, but it was possible to reconstruct the conversations and line of events. A memorial service was held on 10 May and was attended by Prime Minister Gro Harlem Brundtland. The last Home Guard personnel concluded their work on 11 May and the police concluded their investigations at Torghatten on 13 May.

In May 2013, the investigation board was made aware that two passengers each had Mobira Talkman 450 mobile telephones with them on the flights. As this had not been mentioned in the original report, AIBN conducted a review of the issue and especially if these telephones could have influenced the vertical navigation. They concluded in December that this was not the case, as there were no indications of interferences and that there are no instances where electromagnetic interference has been a contributing cause to an aviation accident.

=== Cause ===
The commission found the cause of the crash was that the approach was started 4 NM (7 km; 5 mi) too early and that the aircraft therefore came below the height of the terrain. No specific reason for the early approach was found, although there were several non-compliances by the crew members to regulations and procedures. Specifically, the commission pointed to the lack of internal control which would have identified operation shortcomings and the lack of proper cockpit procedures, especially regarding callouts. There were no technical faults to the aircraft, and the pilots had full control of the aircraft at the time of the collision, making it a controlled flight into terrain.

Interviews with random pilots in Widerøe showed that the airline had shortcomings in its training procedures, in part because it lacked a Dash 7 simulator. There was a culture in the airline to deviate from cockpit procedures and cooperation. The flight plans often made procedures for mutual control of procedures impractical, and they were commonly skipped. The commission was of the impression that Widerøe's transition from an all-Twin Otter airline to also operate the more demanding Dash 7 was not properly carried out, which had resultant shortcomings in the training and operating procedures. All checklists during the flight were followed correctly. However, the pilots did not elect a method of double-control of the descent and approach, such as by using briefings and callouts.

The pilots had several non-compliances to regulations in their descent. This included using "Torghatten" during the captain's briefing, despite no marking on the map using this name, nor one being located close to the mountain. The aircraft was supposed to have levelled out at 750 metres (2,460 feet), but instead this took place at 500 metres (1,600 feet). The next descent was started at 8 NM (15 km; 9 mi) instead of 4 NM (7 km; 5 mi) from the airport and the aircraft thus came under permitted altitude.

The aircraft was using instrument flight rules (IFR) and Torghatten was covered in fog. The visibility was within the permitted range of IFR. The commission found five errors on Widerøe's maps which could have influenced the accident. This included a formulation which gave the impression that DMR was not in use; a closed "Torget" marker beacon was still on the maps; a vertical flight plan from Lekan was not included; the height limitations in the accident area were noted through comments rather than through a graphical presentation; and confusion as to when the timing of final approach should start. The commission also criticized the airline for its checklists instructing the pilots to tune one of the VHF channels to the company frequency during descent, at a time when non-safety-related communication is unwanted.

Because the aircraft was fully booked, a passenger was allowed to sit in the jump seat in the cockpit. The passenger had no connection with the airline, but was granted permission by the captain via an acquaintance in the airline. Several of the other passengers were employees in Widerøe and should—according to the airline's rules—instead have been seated there. From Namsos to Brønnøysund there were available seats in the cabin, but the jump seat passenger continued to sit in the cockpit. The commission felt that the passenger's conversation with the captain drew his attention and concentration away from his duties at a critical point of the flight. This also disrupted communication between the two pilots, resulting in the mutual control being disrupted.

== Aftermath ==
Flight 710 was the second fatal and write-off accident of a Dash 7, and remains the deadliest. It was at the time the third-deadliest aviation accident in Norwegian history, after the 1961 Holtaheia Vickers Viking crash and Braathens SAFE Flight 239 in 1972. It has since become the fourth-deadliest by Vnukovo Airlines Flight 2801. It remains the deadliest accident in Northern Norway.

The commission recommended that Widerøe update its maps for Brønnøysund, review and improve its landing procedures, improve its internal control procedures to ensure that pilots follow the airline's flight operation regulations, and introduce the Sterile Cockpit Rule. The commission recommended that the Civil Aviation Administration change the flight paths at Brønnøysund to increase the altitude around Torghatten. Flight 710 was the second of four fatal Widerøe accidents which occurred between 1982 and 1993. In the first accident, Flight 933, a poor cockpit culture had also been discovered, but little was followed up, in part because of a conspiracy theory which surfaced regarding a collision with a fighter jet. Also in the following two major Widerøe accidents, Flight 839 in 1990 and Flight 744 in 1993, the investigation uncovered operational shortcomings.

The press had an aggressive coverage of the accident. Several major press organizations attended the memorial service, and newspapers published close-up pictures of crying next of kin on their front pages. The Norwegian Press Complaints Commission, a committee appointed by the newspapers themselves, acquitted Dagbladet after a complaint for their aggressive image use. However, the accident coverage started an internal debate among journalists about their coverage of major accidents. The conclusion was that private sorrow was not to be covered in the media, and since then they have had a strict self-enforcement of such a policy.

Brønnøysund Airport installed the SCAT-I satellite-based landing system on 29 October 2007. Avinor's Steinar Hamar stated at the opening ceremony that the system would have prevented both Flight 710 and Flight 744 at Namsos Airport in 1993. The roll-out, taking place at most of Avinor's regional airports, is scheduled for completion in 2013.
