= Brønnøysund Airport =

Airport in Bronnoysund, Norway

Brønnøysund Airport Brønnøysund lufthavn

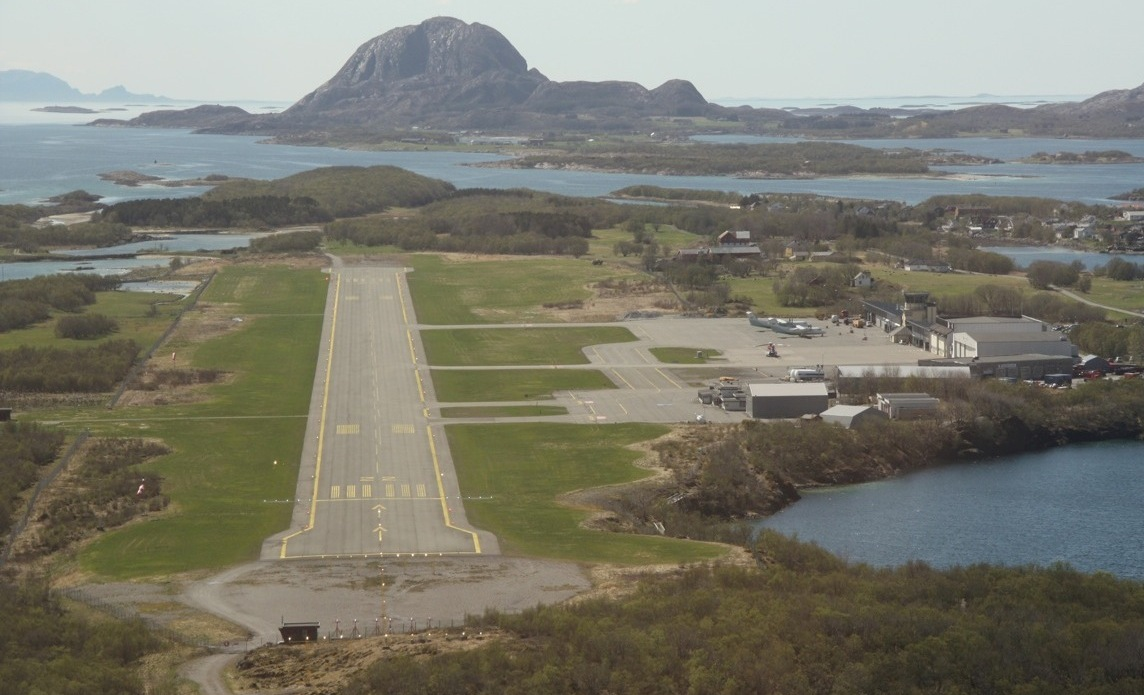
- Southward view, Torghatten in the horizon
- IATA: BNN; ICAO: ENBN

Summary
- Airport type: Public
- Operator: Avinor
- Serves: Brønnøysund, Norway
- Location: Brønnøysund, Brønnøy, Nordland
- Elevation AMSL: 8 m / 25 ft
- Coordinates: 65°27′40″N 012°13′03″E
- Website: avinor.no

Map
- Location within Norway

Runways
Direction	Length		Surface
Direction	m	ft	Surface
03/21	1,199	3,934	Asphalt

Statistics (2014)
- Passengers: 117,471
- Aircraft movements: 11,494
- Cargo (tonnes): 39

Brønnøysund Airport (Norwegian: Brønnøysund lufthavn; IATA: BNN, ICAO: ENBN) is a regional airport located at the town of Brønnøysund, in Brønnøy Municipality, Nordland county, Norway. The airport is owned and operated by the state-owned Avinor and serves the southern part of Helgeland. It has a 1,200-by-30-meter (3,937 ft × 98 ft) runway numbered 03–21 and is served by Widerøe, which operates their Bombardier Dash 8 aircraft to Oslo, Trondheim, Bodø, Bergen and other airports in Helgeland. The airport also serves offshore helicopter flights by CHC Helikopter Service to Norne and temporary oil rigs in the Norwegian Sea. In 2014, the airport served 117,471 passengers, making it the second-busiest regional airport in Norway, after Florø Airport.

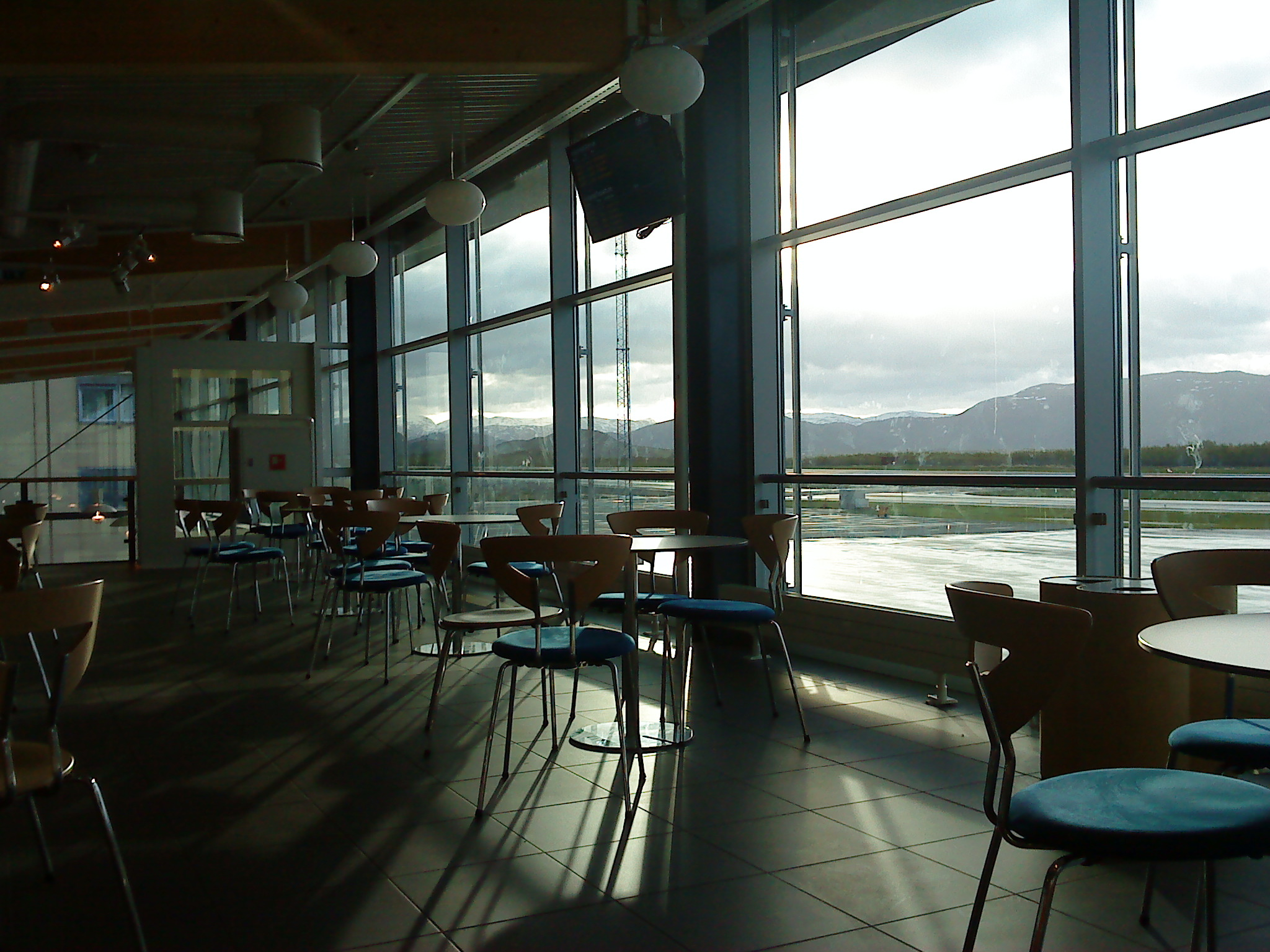

Brønnøysund received seaplane services in 1935, at first operated by Norwegian Air Lines and later by Widerøe. Plans for short take-off and landing airports in Northern Norway were launched in 1965; construction started in 1967 and Brønnøysund Airport opened along with three nearby airports on 1 June 1968. Originally served using Twin Otter aircraft, Widerøe replaced them with Dash 7 aircraft in 1982 and Dash 8 aircraft in 1992. Offshore helicopter traffic started in 1983. The runway was originally 800 meters (2,625 ft); it was extended to 1,000 meters (3,281 ft) in 1987 and to the current length in 1999. A new control tower opened in 2000 and a new terminal in 2008. There have been two major accidents connected with the airport: Widerøe Flight 710 in 1988 and Helikopter Service Flight 451 in 1997.

== History ==
The first aircraft to land in Brønnøysund was a Hansa-Brandenburg seaplane of the Royal Norwegian Navy Air Service on 23 July 1922. It was piloted by Hjalmar Riiser-Larsen and Finn Lützow-Holm, en route from Horten to Kirkenes. The following thirteen years Brønnøysund only saw occasional landings, when Norwegian Air Lines started a service from Bergen to Tromsø on 7 June 1935, which included a stop at the harbor in Brønnøysund. Passengers and mail would be rowed out to the waiting aircraft. The first season the route was flown using a single-engine Junkers W 34. The aircraft turned out to be too small and a larger Junkers Ju 52 was introduced the following season. Flights were dependent on good weather and were only operated during the summer. The route was taken over by Widerøe in 1938. All civilian flights were terminated during World War II, although the town would see occasional military landings.

Seaplane routes resumed in 1947 using the Junkers Ju 52. Construction of primary airports in Norway started in the 1950s based on building joint military and civilian airport with funding from the North Atlantic Treaty Organization (NATO). The alliance considered constructing an airport at Søndre Herøy in Herøy Municipality, an archipelago near Sandnesssjøen, but funding was never allocated to the project.

No primary airports had been built in Helgeland by the mid-1960s. The coastal parts of the region, such as at Brønnøysund, were without highways and railways. Although Widerøe operated a seaplane route, it remained a summer-only service. Travel time to Sandnessjøen, where the closest hospital was located, took five hours. A committee, led by Erik Himle and later Preben Munthe, was appointed in 1962 to consider additional airports in Norway. The Sud Aviation Caravelle jet aircraft was about to be phased into use on the main domestic routes by Scandinavian Airlines System and the committee recommended in 1964 that nine new airports be built which could serve jetliners, including an airport in Sandnesssjøen.

Widerøe came with an alternative proposal and suggested that a network of smaller airports be built instead, which could be served using short take-off and landing (STOL) aircraft. Smaller airports could be built and operated at lower costs than larger airports, but both airports and airlines would need subsidies to operate. Håkon Kyllingmark was appointed Minister of Transport and Communications in 1965 and was a proponent of the STOLport proposal. The political rationale was that, despite that the total operating costs would rise, that it would provide better services to rural areas and thus keep up their population. The regional airports were built in groups, and the first four were built in Namsos and Helgeland.

Planning started in 1966 and construction commenced the following year. Brønnøysund Airport cost NOK 2.7 million plus costs for expropriation and navigational aids. NOK 1.9 million was covered by the state, while the rest was covered by Brønnøy Municipality. The runway was originally 800 meters (2,625 ft) and was the only asphalted area in Brønnøysund. The airport was originally operated by the municipality, except the tower, which was operated by the Norwegian Telecommunications Administration. Brønnøysund was one of very few regional airports to receive a restaurant. The airport opened on 30 May 1968, along with Mo i Rana Airport, Røssvoll, Namsos Airport, Høknesøra and Sandnessjøen Airport, Stokka. Widerøe commenced flights to Bodø and Trondheim with their de Havilland Canada DHC-6 Twin Otters the following day.

The first year of operation saw 6,157 passengers, dropping to 5,543 in 1969. Originally there were two southbound and two northbound flights per day in the summer and one per direction during winter. In 1969 this increased to two flights per direction all year. Trønderfly started an air ambulance service in the early 1970s. Widerøe introduced the de Havilland Canada Dash 7 in 1982, resulting in the terminal being expanded. Offshore helicopter services began the following year. The runway was expanded to 1,000 meters (3,281 ft) in 1987.

Offshore helicopter operations commenced out of Brønnøysund Airport in 1981, when Helikopter Service was contracted to fly to the exploration field on Trænabanken. A combined fixed-wing and helicopter hangar was completed in 1983. The contract changed to Lufttransport in 1984. Operations remained limited and in 1989 the airport only saw 34 helicopter flights. The exploration resulted in a positive finding on the Norne field, which started production in 1997. Norsk Helikopter, later renamed Bristow Norway, established a helicopter base at Brønnøysund Airport in 2002 and took over flights to the Skarv Oil Field.

NATO showed interest in upgrading Brønnøysund Airport in 1991. Specifically, they intended to spend NOK 125 million in expanding the runway to 2,000 meters (6,562 ft) and building a fuel depot. The airport was planned used as a relief military airbase without any permanently stationed aircraft. The plans were canceled in 1993 following cutbacks in NATO. Widerøe introduced Dash 8 aircraft in 1992, gradually replacing the Dash 7. In 1996, Brønnøysund and 25 other regional airports were taken over by the state and the Civil Aviation Administration (later renamed Avinor). The runway was extended to 1,200 meters (3,937 ft) in 1999; 1,440 meters (4,724 ft) including the safety zone at each end. While allowing for a direct service to Oslo, the service was terminated the following year. The same year a new control tower was opened and the old tower was taken over by a motorcycle club.

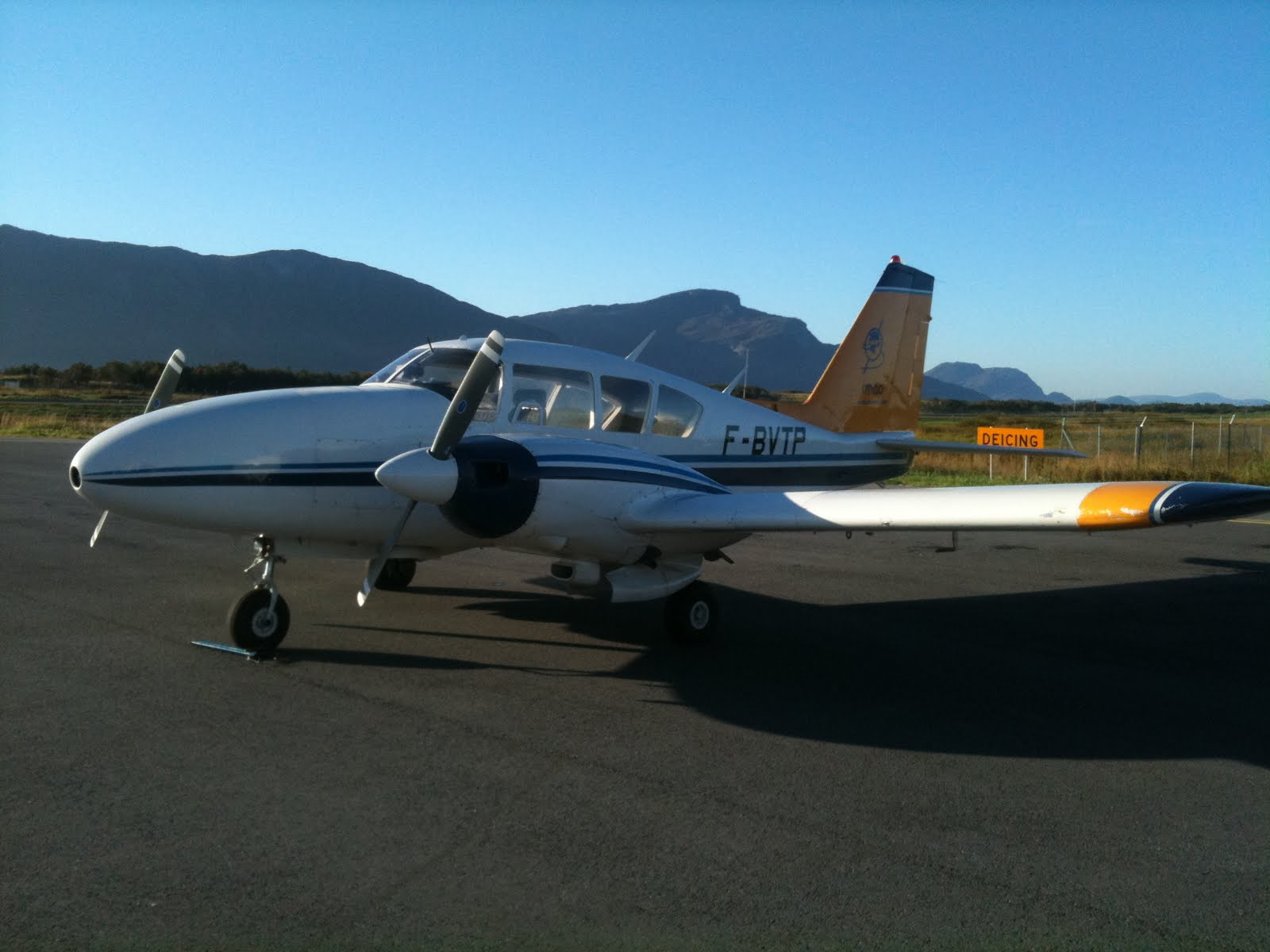
Piper PA-23 at the airport

Airport security was introduced on 1 January 2005. This put a large strain on the terminal capacity and the terminal had to be expanded. Makeshift solutions were used, such as plywood boards to allocate people through the security check. In late 2004, the airport started planning an all-new terminal building, as the old terminal was deemed both too small and out of date. Construction of the NOK-115-million terminal started on 24 October 2006. As the first airport in the world, Brønnøysund received SCAT-I, a satellite-based landing system, on 29 October 2007. The new terminal opened on 26 May 2008, which allowed the a restaurant to open at the airport, all vehicles to be stored indoors and included a new helicopter terminal. Thon Hotel Torghatten opened in October 2009 and an airport surveillance radar was installed in 2010, making Brønnøysund the first regional airport in Norway to have one.

Widerøe reintroduced direct flights to Oslo on 10 May 2010. Statoil started using scheduled services instead of their previous charter flights on 2 January 2011. This caused Widerøe to increase the number of direct flights to Oslo to three per day on 1 April 2011. Widerøe introduced irregular charter flights to Manchester in April 2012, largely targeting English tourists traveling on holidays and Norwegian football patriots.

Avinor was working on plans to close the airports in Sandnessjøen, Mo i Rana and Mosjøen and replace them with a new primary airport at Mo i Rana. Brønnøysund has stated that they wish to keep their airport and not be part of a central airport for the region. There is over 3 hours driving distance to Mo i Rana (compared to 5 hours to the much larger Trondheim airport). There have also been launched proposals by local politicians to extend the runway at Brønnøysund to 2,000 meters (6,562 ft). This proposal was in 2012 dismissed by the municipal council, which instead wanted a shorter extension to allow landing of Dash 8 Q400 aircraft.

== Facilities ==
The airport is located 2.5 kilometers (1.6 mi) southeast of the town center of Brønnøysund. It consists of a combined passenger terminal and works building and includes a café. There is a separate helicopter terminal. The runway, numbered 04–22, is 1,200 by 30 meters (3,937 ft × 98 ft); when including the safety zones at each end the total length is 1,440 meters (4,724 ft). It is the only regional airport in Norway which has an airport surveillance radar installed. The airport had 117,471 passengers, 10,494 aircraft movements and 39 tonnes of cargo in 2014.

Taxis, paid parking and car rental is available at the airport. Driving time to the town center is about five to seven minutes. There is a bus service operated by Torghatten Trafikkselskap from the airport to the town center; onwards connection is available to several areas in Helgeland and Namdalen. Ferry and fast ferry services are also operated from the town center to nearby islands. The 44-room Thon Hotel Torghatten is located next to the airport.

== Airlines and destinations ==
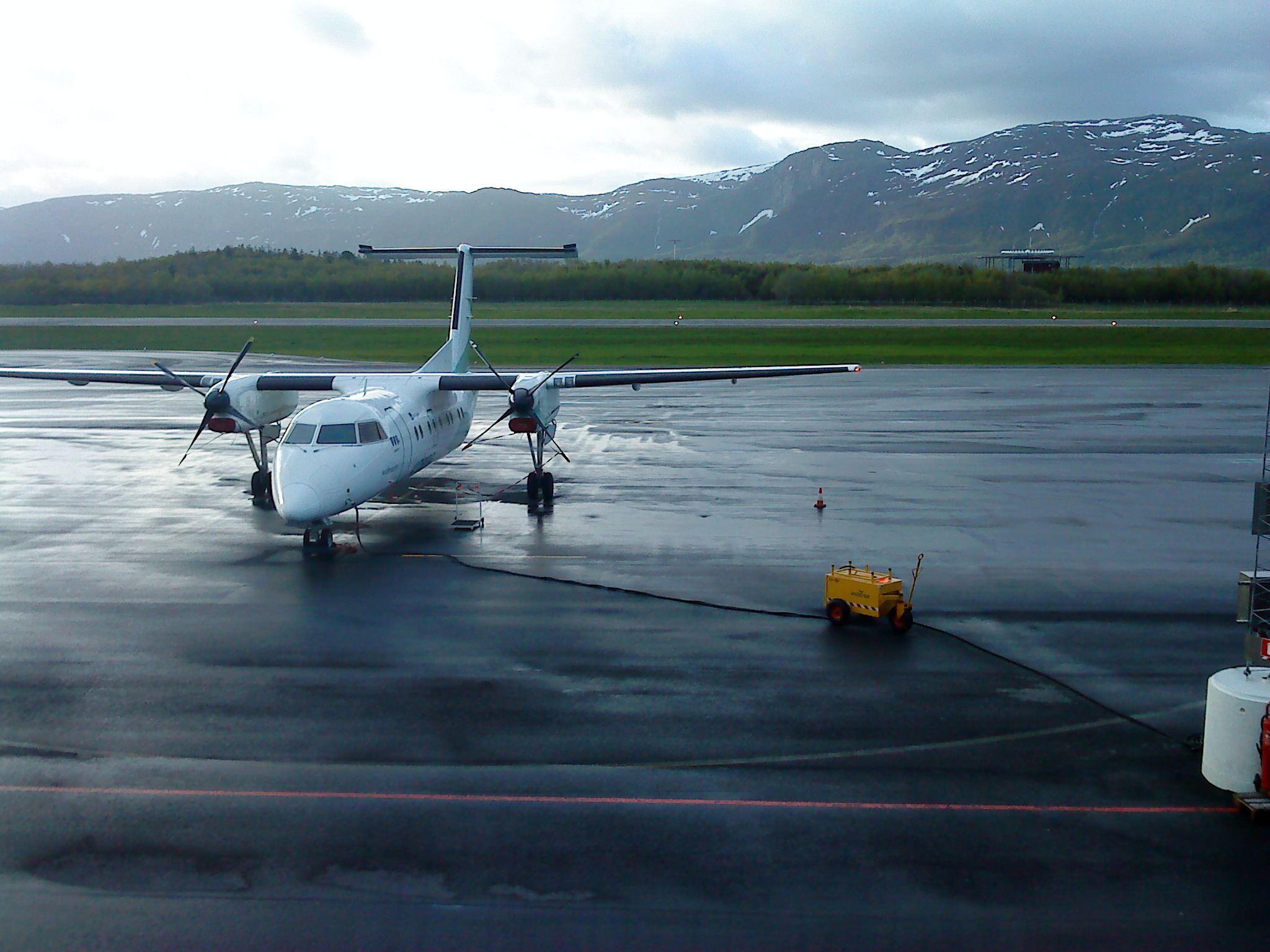
Widerøe has all scheduled flights from Brønnøysund, here with a Dash 8-100

Widerøe is the only airline operating scheduled flights out of Brønnøysund, serving it with their Bombardier Dash 8 aircraft. The services to Bodø and Trondheim are subsidized through public service obligations with the Ministry of Transport and Communications.

CHC Helikopter Service operates flights to the offshore oil platform at Norne on contract with Statoil. The oil company flies an average of 55 people to the airport with various scheduled services and onwards to the oil field. In addition, the helicopter operator flies to various temporary oil rigs. It has two Sikorsky S-92 helicopters stationed at Brønnøysund. In 2011, there were 17,229 offshore helicopter passengers who traveled through Brønnøysund Airport.

The Norwegian Air Ambulance operates both a helicopter and fixed-wing air ambulance service out of Brønnøysund Airport. Aircraft operations are subcontracted to Lufttransport, which operates an AgustaWestland AW139 helicopter and a Beech King Air fixed-wing aircraft. Both are staffed by medical personnel from Helgeland Hospital Trust. In 2011, the helicopter flew 465 missions and the fixed-wing aircraft 1022 missions.

Airlines	Destinations
Bristow Helicopters	Skarv
CHC Helikopter Service	Norne
Widerøe	Bodø, Oslo, Sandnessjøen, Trondheim

== Statistics ==
Annual passenger traffic
Year	Passengers	% Change
2025	144,832	▲13.1%
2024	128,080	▲2.2%
2023	125,286	▼ -2.1%
2022	128,032	▲27.3%
2021	100,583	▲7.7%
2020	93,424	▼ -28.8%
2019	131,208	▼ -0.0%
2018	131,215	▲10.9%
2017	118,344	▼ -11.3%
2016	133,393	▲2.9%
2015	129,600	

== Accidents and incidents ==
- Widerøe Flight 710 took place on 6 May 1988 when a Dash 7 crashed into nearby Torghatten mountain during a landing approach, killing all 36 aboard. It remains the worst accident involving a Dash 7 and is the fourth-worst accident on Norwegian soil.
- Helikopter Service Flight 451 took place on 8 September 1997, when a Eurocopter Super Puma en route to Norne crashed into the Norwegian Sea 100 nautical miles (190 km; 120 mi) northwest of the airport, killing all 12 people on board.

== Bibliography ==
- Olsen-Hagen, Bernt Charles (2014). Offshore Helicopters: Helikopteraktiviteten på norsk kontinentalsokkel. Aviation Forlag. ISBN 978-82-999547-0-9.
