= Bristow Helicopters Flight 56C =

1995 helicopter accident in the North Sea

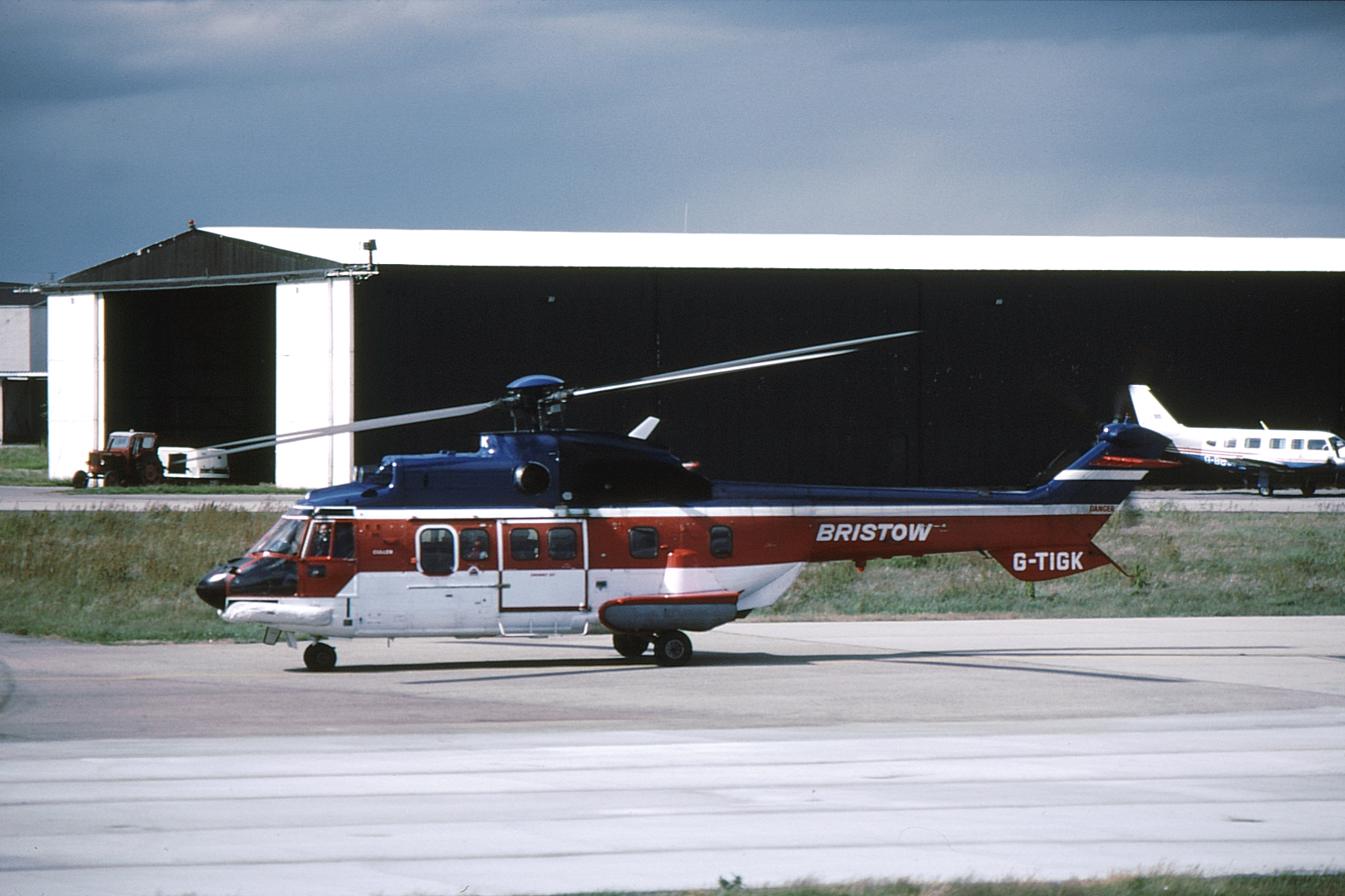
- G-TIGK, the helicopter involved in the accident, seen in 1986 with a previous livery

Accident
- Date: 19 January 1995
- Summary: Lightning strike, ditching
- Site: 6 miles southwest of the Brae Alpha oil rig in the North Sea; 58°42′N 1°18′E

Aircraft
- Aircraft type: Eurocopter AS332L Super Puma
- Aircraft name: Cullen
- Operator: Bristow Helicopters
- Call sign: 56C
- Registration: G-TIGK
- Flight origin: Aberdeen Airport, Scotland, United Kingdom
- Destination: Brae Alpha oil rig, Brae oilfield, North Sea
- Occupants: 18
- Passengers: 16
- Crew: 2
- Fatalities: 0
- Injuries: 16
- Survivors: 18

Bristow Helicopters Flight 56C was a helicopter flight that flew between Aberdeen and the Brae Alpha oil rig in the North Sea. On 19 January 1995, the AS 332L Super Puma helicopter operating the route, registered G-TIGK and named Cullen, was struck by lightning. The flight was carrying 16 oil workers from Aberdeen to an oil platform at the Brae oilfield. All 18 people on board survived.

== Crew ==
The commander of the flight was Cedric Roberts (44). He had been with Bristow Helicopters Ltd since 1974. He was a very experienced pilot with more than 9,600 hours of flying time under his belt. The first officer was Lionel Sole (39). Sole had been with Bristow Helicopters Ltd since 1990. He had more than 3,100 hours of flying time to his credit.

== Accident ==
En route, the helicopter ran into poor weather and was then struck by lightning. This caused severe damage to the tail rotor. Though the helicopter managed to limp for a few more minutes, the tail rotor eventually failed completely when the copilot tried to test if his controls were still working and the pilots were forced to perform an emergency autorotation onto the rough seas. Emergency flotation devices on the helicopter allowed the passengers and crew to be evacuated onto a life raft. Despite the high waves and bad weather, all the people on board the flight were rescued by the standby rescue ship Grampian Freedom.

The lightning strike was an isolated one in the storm, and may have been induced by the helicopter flying through the cloud. The accident investigation also revealed potential troubles with the carbon fibre composite material with brass strip design of the rotors which made the rotorblades prone to explosion and damage from lightning strikes.

== In popular culture ==
The events of Flight 56C were featured in "Helicopter Down", a Season 3 (2005) episode of the Canadian TV series Mayday (called Air Emergency and Air Disasters in the U.S. and Air Crash Investigation in the UK and elsewhere around the world).

== See also ==
Other North Sea helicopter incidents:

- 1986 British International Helicopters Chinook crash
- Helikopter Service Flight 451 (1997)
- Bond Offshore Helicopters Flight 85N (2009)
- CHC Helikopter Service Flight 241 (2016)
