= Bristow Norway =

Norwegian helicopter operator

IATA	ICAO	Call sign
UH	BHL	BRISTOW
- Founded: 1993
- Hubs: Stavanger Airport, Sola
- Focus cities: Bergen Airport, Flesland; Florø Airport; Hammerfest Airport
- Fleet size: 24
- Parent company: Bristow Group
- Headquarters: Stavanger
- Key people: Sondre Nordseth (managing director); Tommy Benjaminsen (technical director); Dan-Børge Haugan (maintenance manager); Tom Idar Finnesand (flight operations manager)
- Website: bristowgroup.com

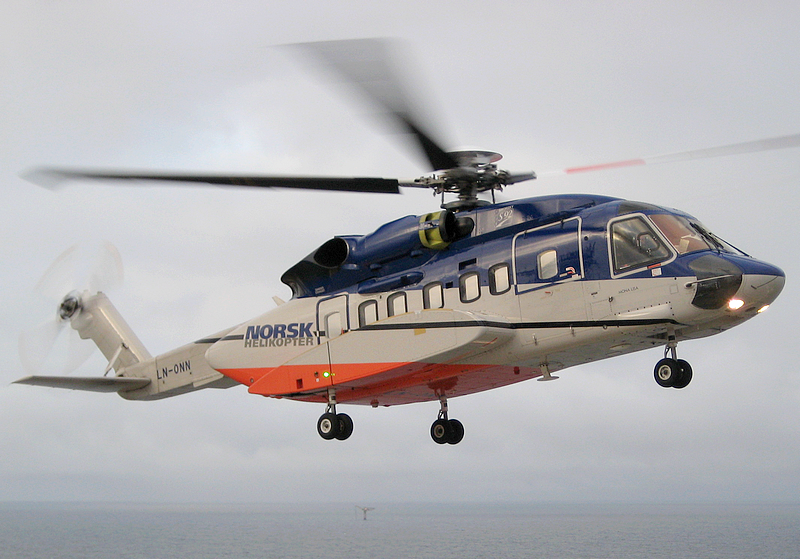
Sikorsky S-92

Bristow Norway AS (formerly Norsk Helikopter) is a Norwegian helicopter company that transports crew to oil installations in the North Sea. It has headquarters in Stavanger and has additional operations out of Bergen, Florø, and Hammerfest. The company operates a fleet of 24 Sikorsky S92 helicopters and has 420 employees.

The company has contracts with all the oil companies operating on the Norwegian shelf for crew change flights. In addition it operates SAR aircraft out of Ekofisk and Hammerfest.

== History ==
Offshore helicopter transport in Norway was traditionally dominated by Helikopter Service. By the late 1980s three competitors were established, Lufttransport, Mørefly and Braathens Helikopter, but by 1992 Helikopter Service had bought all three. Both the authorities and the oil companies wanted multiple operators to stimulate competition. Norsk Helikopter was incorporated in 1993 to fill this gap. It was initially owned as a joint venture between Andreas Ugland and Bristow Helicopter, with the Norwegian shipping billionaire owning 51 per cent. This resulted in a close technical cooperation with Bristow's other helicopter companies. The company was established with a fleet of Aerospatiale AS332L Super Pumas.

The company's first and main base is Stavanger Airport, Sola. The airline expanded to Bergen Airport, Flesland, in 1999 and then to Brønnøysund Airport, Brønnøy in 2002. A base opened at Hammerfest Airport on 11 November 2004 in conjunction with the construction at Snøhvit.

Norsk Helikopter became the first European operator of the Sikorsky S-92A in 2005. The same year it bought the land-helicopter operator Lufttransport. This lasted for three years. In 2008 the Ugland Group sold its shares to Bristow, in a deal which secured them full ownership of Lufttransport. Norsk Helikopter subsequently changed their name to Bristow Norway in April 2009.

The company subsequently won several important contracts. In 2009 it started flying out of Hammerfest for StatoilHydro and Eni. The following year it won an important contract for the Draugen and Sleipner fields. The same year it bought its first Eurocopter EC225 for all-weather search and rescue.

The 'Norsk Helikopter' brand was retained by Ugland, which sold it to Avincis Group (since purchased by Babcock International).

== Fleet ==
- 24 Sikorsky S-92A

== Accidents and incidents ==
- On 28 February 2024, a Sikorsky S-92 carrying six passengers crashed into the ocean outside of Øygarden Municipality in Vestland while on a rescue training mission for Equinor. Five of the six people on board survived.

== Bibliography ==
- Olsen-Hagen, Bernt Charles (2014). Offshore Helicopters: Helikopteraktiviteten på norsk kontinentalsokkel. Aviation Forlag. ISBN 978-82-999547-0-9.
