= Helikopter Service Flight 451 =

1997 helicopter accident

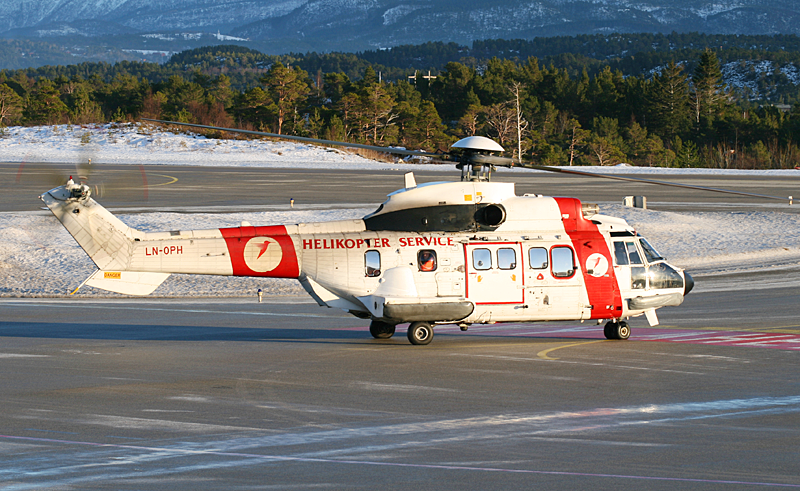
- A similar Super Puma operated by Helikopter Service

Accident
- Date: 8 September 1997
- Summary: Mechanical failure
- Site: Norwegian Sea, Norway; 66°04′25″N 008°34′21″E

Aircraft
- Aircraft type: Eurocopter AS 332L1 Super Puma
- Operator: Helikopter Service
- ICAO flight No.: HKS451
- Call sign: HELIBUS 451
- Registration: LN-OPG
- Flight origin: Brønnøysund Airport, Brønnøy, Brønnøy Municipality, Norway
- Destination: Norne, Norwegian Sea, Norway
- Passengers: 10
- Crew: 2
- Fatalities: 12
- Survivors: 0

On 8 September 1997 Flight 451, a Eurocopter AS 332L1 Super Puma, from the Norwegian helicopter operator Helikopter Service, crashed into the Norwegian Sea, 100 nautical miles (190 km; 120 mi) northwest of Brønnøysund, Norway. The aircraft was en route from Brønnøysund Airport, Brønnøy to Norne, an offshore Floating production storage and offloading vessel (FPSO). The accident was caused by a fatigue crack in a spline of a power transmission shaft connector, which ultimately caused the power transmission shaft to fail. All twelve people on board were killed in the crash.

== Aircraft ==
The accident aircraft was an AS332 L1 Super Puma helicopter, manufactured by Eurocopter (now named Airbus Helicopters), registration LN-OPG.

== Background ==
At 06:00 a.m. local time (UTC+2), Helikopter Service Flight 451 took off from Brønnøysund Airport with two pilots and ten passengers, heading for the Statoil operated FPSO Norne. The route was a daily shuttle due to lack of accommodation on Norne during the busy period when the vessel was under commissioning.

== Accident ==
The flight proceeded as normal until 06:50:07 hours when the engine overspeed light was observed for a short time. The co-pilot read out the corresponding information from the emergency checklist, before they continued the approach to land on Norne. At 06:52:41 hours the crew contacted Transocean Prospect, the oil platform that was handling radio communication with helicopters landing on Norne. At 06:54:42 hours they informed Bodø ATCC that they were leaving 2,000 feet (610 m), with an estimated time of arrival of 07:05 hours. According to the helicopter's cockpit voice recorder (CVR), the abnormal indications recurred at 06:55:37 hours before "something strange" was observed at 06:55:55 hours. A thud was heard at 06:56:30 hours; then, after a loud crunching sound 1.7 seconds later, the crew lost control over the aircraft. The helicopter fell to the sea from around 1,800 feet (550 m) and all on board were killed as a result of the impact. The wreckage sank and came to rest at a depth of 830 metres (2,720 ft).

All twelve people on board were killed in the crash.

== Summary of investigation findings ==
Following their investigation of the accident, the Norwegian Accident Investigation Board (AIBN) concluded that the cause of the accident was multiple fatigue cracks in the splined sleeve between the high-speed bendix shaft and the right-hand engine, which had caused damage to the engine overspeed protection system. The splined sleeve disintegrated, severing the high-speed shaft, which led to an overspeed of the right-hand power turbine which in turn burst, destroying the left-hand engine as well as to cutting control rods which made the helicopter uncontrollable.

The crew could not be expected to have been sufficiently knowledgeable about the aircraft's control system to understand the seriousness of the intermittent overspeed alarm, and there were no procedures or checklists available that covered this scenario.

The AIBN also found reason to believe that one of the HUMS accelerometers installed in the aircraft would have been able to alert maintenance crew about the change in vibration patterns in time to avoid the accident had it been serviceable since it was configured with a setpoint value. Retrospective analysis of HUMS data showed that vibrations at the location where this accelerometer was mounted were above the setpoint value before the accident. The part of HUMS that was serviceable stored relevant information, but those data had to be retrieved by maintenance staff and analyzed between flights. At the time of the accident, usage of HUMS in offshore helicopters was in an early phase and not required by regulations. The cracks had been developing slowly for several days before the catastrophic failure occurred, and if HUMS data had been systematically retrieved and analyzed between flights the change in vibration patterns might have been discovered by maintenance staff before the fatal flight. Regulation of HUMS in offshore helicopters was one of 18 recommendations in the final AIBN report. The AIBN report and the unrealized potential of HUMS in avoiding this accident was discussed at the 2003 HUMS Conference in Melbourne and was described as "a defining moment" for HUMS in offshore helicopter operations.

== See also ==
Other North Sea helicopter incidents:

- 1986 British International Helicopters Chinook crash
- Bristow Helicopters Flight 56C (1995)
- Bond Offshore Helicopters Flight 85N (2009)
- CHC Helikopter Service Flight 241 (2016)
