= Skarv oil field =

Norwegian oil and gas field in the Norwegian Sea

Coordinates: 65°44′16″N 7°38′45″E

Skarv is an oil and gas field in the Norwegian Sea approximately 35 kilometers south-west of the Norne oil field. It is produced from an FPSO. As of 2014 remaining reserves are thought to be 100 million barrels of oil and 40 billion cubic meters of natural gas.

The field Skarv was discovered in 1998 and the field started producing 31 December 2012.
