= Hammerfest Airport =

Airport in Hammerfest, Finnmark, Norway

Hammerfest Airport Hammerfest lufthavn

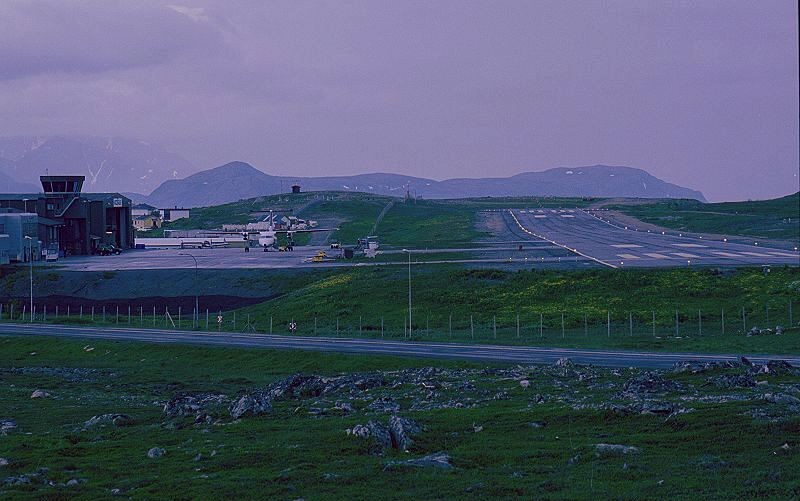
- IATA: HFT; ICAO: ENHF

Summary
- Airport type: Public
- Operator: Avinor
- Serves: Hammerfest
- Location: Prærien, Hammerfest, Norway
- Elevation AMSL: 80 m (260 ft)
- Coordinates: 70°40′47″N 023°40′07″E
- Website: avinor.no

Map
- Location within Norway

Runways
| Direction | Length | | Surface |
| Direction | m | ft | Surface |
|---|---|---|---|
| 05/23 | 880 | 2,890 | Asphalt |

Statistics (2014)
- Passengers: 145,396
- Aircraft movements: 13,822
- Cargo (tonnes): 16

Hammerfest Airport (Norwegian: Hammerfest lufthavn; IATA: HFT, ICAO: ENHF) is a regional airport at Prærien just outside the town of Hammerfest in Hammerfest Municipality in Finnmark county, Norway. It is operated by the state-owned Avinor and handled 145,396 passengers in 2014, making it the third-busiest regional airport in the country. The airport has a 880-meter (2,890 ft) runway aligned 05/23. Services are provided by Widerøe using the Dash 8-100. Up to eight daily flights are provided to Tromsø and public service obligation flights are flown eastwards to other airports in Finnmark. The airport is the base for offshore helicopter services operated by Bristow Norway and CHC Helikopter Service. An estimated 40,000 people from Hammerfest Airport's catchment area annually use Alta Airport for flights to Oslo.

Hammerfest was served from 1935 by scheduled seaplanes at a water aerodrome at Rypefjord. Services were interrupted by World War II, but resumed in 1945, lasting until the 1963 opening of Alta Airport. Hammerfest Airport opened on 1 August 1974, along with four other regional airports in Finnmark, and was originally served with de Havilland Canada Twin Otters. The de Havilland Canada Dash 7 was introduced in 1983 and a helicopter base was established in 1989. The Dash 8 was introduced in 1995 and the airport was nationalized two years later. A Dash 8 was damaged beyond repair after a hard landing in 2005. Because of the limited space for expansion and unfavorable wind conditions, there is a proposal to build a new airport at Grøtnes.

== History ==
The first plans for serving Hammerfest with an airline route was launched in a government plan from 1933. It proposed that flights in Northern Norway be carried out using seaplanes, and proposed Hammerfest as one of several stops on a route from Trondheim to Vadsø. Norwegian Air Lines (DNL) received the concession to operate all routes in Norway from 1935, resulting in the coastal route from Bergen to Tromsø commencing. The following year a connecting route from Tromsø via Hammerfest to Honningsvåg was subcontracted to Widerøe. The water aerodrome in Hammerfest was located at Rypefjord and consisted of a buoy where the aircraft parked; passengers were transported to the aircraft in a boat. All flights were terminated in 1939 and remained so until the end of World War II in 1945.

DNL resumed the Hammerfest route in 1946, connecting the town to Tromsø, Vadsø, and Kirkenes with a Junkers Ju 52. The route later also served Alta and made part of the coastal route to Bergen. The segment north of Tromsø was taken over by Widerøe in 1954, and two years later Widerøe also started a route from Hammerfest via Alta to Bardufoss Airport, which allowed for a transfer to an Oslo-bound aircraft. Widerøe mostly used Noorduyn Norseman and de Havilland Canada Otters on the routes. Alta Airport and two other primary airports in Finnmark opened in 1963 and Widerøe decided to terminate its seaplane routes in the county. At the time a bus trip from Hammerfest to Alta took four hours. Unlike the seaplane routes, the landplane routes from Alta were able to operate during winter. Norving established an air ambulance base at Hammerfest in 1961. With the opening of Alta Airport, Norving applied for permission and subsidies to operate a feeder service from Hammerfest to Alta, but the application was rejected by the government.

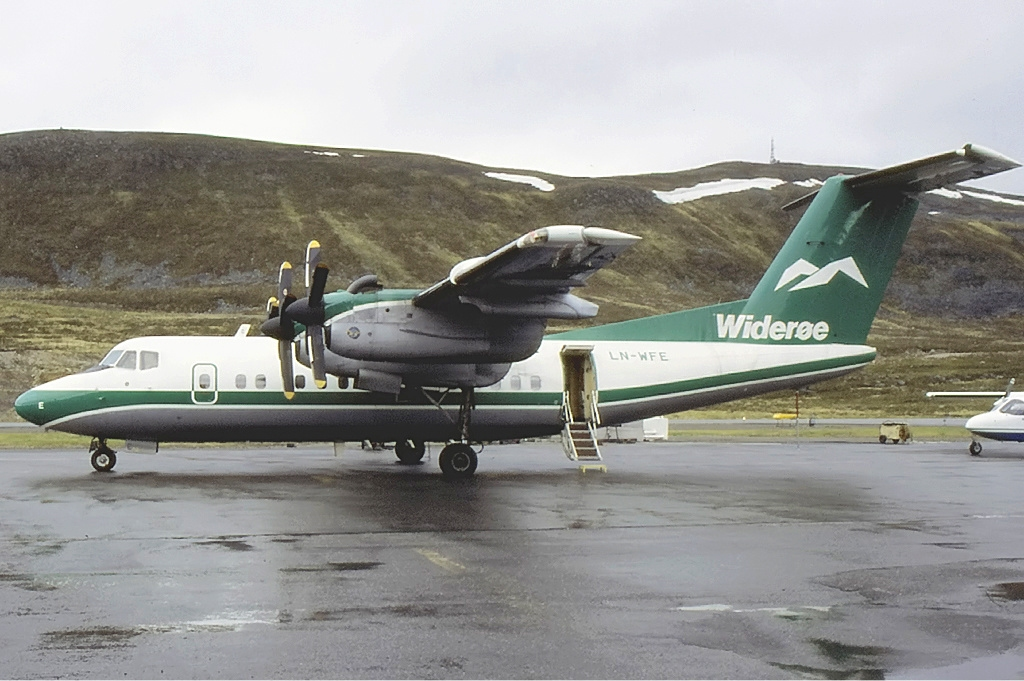
Widerøe de Havilland Canada Dash 7 in 1987

The mid-1960s saw several proposals for regional airports in Finnmark. A committee appointed by Finnmark County Council proposed, in 1966, Hammerfest as one of six suitable sites for a simple airfield to serve air ambulance and air taxi services. At the same time the government was working on plans to build a national network of short take-off and landing airport. The plans eventually called for six airports in northern Troms and Finnmark, a plan passed by Parliament in 1972. Both Widerøe and Norving applied to operate the subsidized routes in Finnmark, and the contract was awarded to Widerøe, which operated the subsidized routes in the rest of the country. The airport opened on 1 August 1974 with Hammerfest Municipality as the owner and operator. The same day four other airports in Finnmark and Troms commenced operations. These were all originally served using Widerøe's de Havilland Canada Twin Otter aircraft. The airline established its technical base for Finnmark at Hammerfest.

Widerøe introduced the de Havilland Canada Dash 7 on the route from Tromsø Airport to Hammerfest in 1983, the same year as Norving started flights from Hammerfest to Hasvik Airport. The Hasvik roue was taken over by Widerøe in 1990. Helikopter Service established a helicopter base at Hammerfest Airport in 1989 to serve the offshore petroleum industry which was searching for oil in the Barents Sea. Widerøe introduced the Dash 8 on the Finnmark routes in 1995. The airport was taken over by the state and the Civil Aviation Administration (later renamed Avinor) on 1 January 1997. The state paid Hammerfest Municipality 19.5 million Norwegian krone (NOK) in compensation. The routes eastwards were made subject to public service obligations with the Ministry of Transport and Communications from 1 April 1997. The routes to Tromsø had a sufficient patronage that they were operated without subsidies.

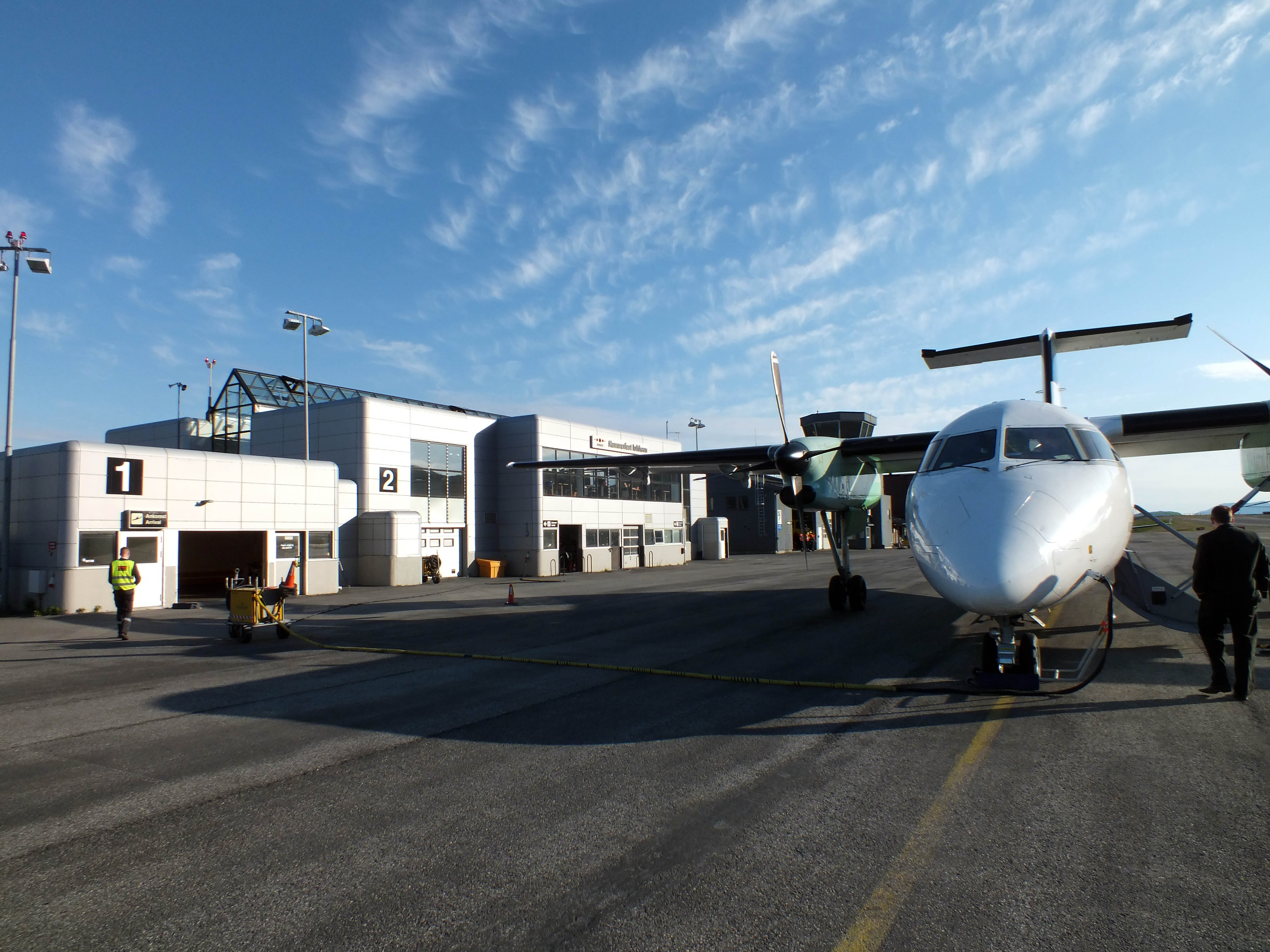
Widerøe de Havilland Canada Dash 8 at Hammerfest Airport

The helicopter operations were taken over by Norsk Helikpoter (later renamed Bristow Norway) when they opened their base on 11 November 2004. Airport security was introduced on 1 January 2005. Hammerfest was the second airport to receive SCAT-I, a Global Positioning System-based landing system, when it was installed in 2007. SCAT-I allows aircraft with the system installed to make a safer and less fuel-consuming landings using a gliding instead of step-down approach. This was followed up with an upgrade to the runway safety area and runway lights in 2008 and 2009.

== Facilities ==
The terminal has a capacity for 250 passengers per hour. It includes a separate area for helicopter traffic, but this is not in use, and helicopter passengers instead use the regular part of the terminal. There is a separate operations and fire station building, which includes the control tower. The asphalt runway measures 880 by 30 meters (2,887 by 98 ft) and aligned 05–23. There are no possibilities of extending the runway, largely because of the terrain at the east end. The tarmac has room for five aircraft the size of Dash 8, in addition to helicopters. The airport is six to seven minutes' drive from the town centre and has parking, taxis, and car rental. Forty-five people work at the airport.

== Airlines and destinations ==
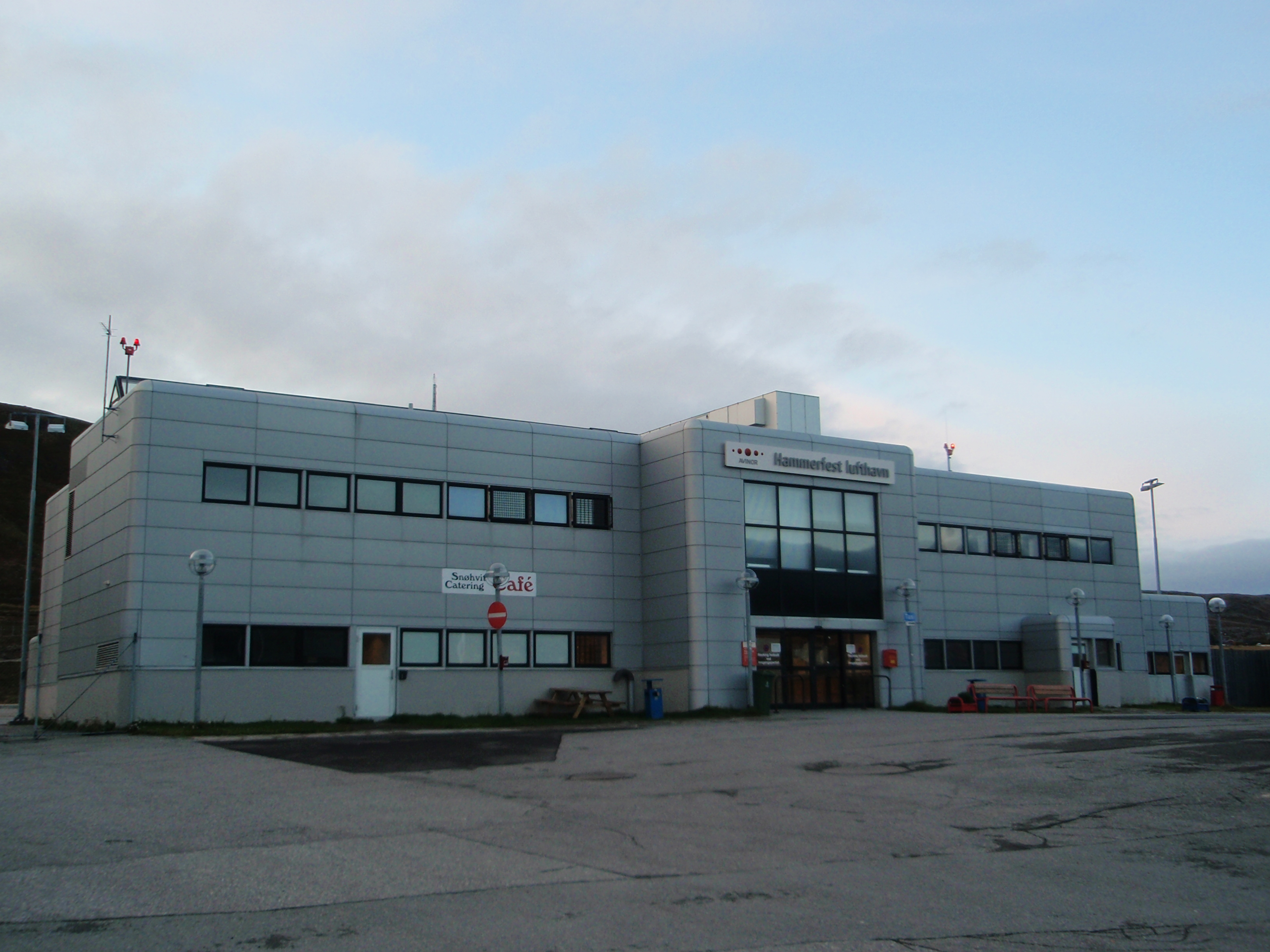
The terminal building

The main route at Hammerfest is Widerøe's service to Tromsø, which is operated up to eight times per day using Dash 8-100/Q200 aircraft. Widerøe also operates flights eastwards to other communities in Finnmark on public service obligations with the Ministry of Transport and Communications. Two helicopter operators have bases at the airport: Bristow Norway, which operates two Eurocopter EC225 Super Pumas, and CHC Helikopter Service, which operates a Sikorsky S-92. Both companies operate flights to offshore installations. One of the Super Pumas is used for search and rescue operations for the petroleum industry and when the Royal Norwegian Air Force's Westland Sea Kings based at Station Group Banak are not available, for instance if they are on another mission or the aircraft are being maintained.

Forty-two percent of the airport's traffic is generated from routes to Oslo and abroad, while twenty-nine percent is to Tromsø. The airport served 145,396 passengers, 13,822 aircraft movements and handled 16 tonnes of cargo in 2014. This included 21,216 passengers and 1,827 aircraft movements which flew offshore. Hammerfest is the third-busiest regional airport in Norway. Patronage since the 2000s has varied with the activity in the petroleum industry. Each year, an estimated 40,000 passengers from the Hammerfest area chose Alta Airport over Hammerfest Airport, as Alta provides direct flights to Oslo. Alta is located 138 kilometers (86 mi) by road from Hammerfest. The catchment area of Hammerfest Airport covers Hammerfest Municipality, although some residents in the Kvalsund area largely use Alta Airport instead.

| Airlines | Destinations |
|---|---|
| Widerøe | Alta, Båtsfjord, Berlevåg, Hasvik, Honningsvåg, Kirkenes, Mehamn, Sørkjosen, Tromsø, Vadsø, Vardø |

== Statistics ==
Annual passenger traffic
| Year | Passengers | % Change |
|---|---|---|
| 2025 | 191,203 | ▲26.7% |
| 2024 | 150,966 | ▲13.9% |
| 2023 | 132,508 | ▼ -14.8% |
| 2022 | 155,493 | ▲0.5% |
| 2021 | 154,795 | ▲40.3% |
| 2020 | 110,339 | ▼ -25.8% |
| 2019 | 148,787 | ▼ -13.8% |
| 2018 | 172,511 | ▼ -11.2% |
| 2017 | 194,287 | ▲12.7% |
| 2016 | 172,441 | ▼ -1.7% |
| 2015 | 175,351 | |

== Accidents and incidents ==
The Widerøe Dash 8-103 aircraft LN-WIK underwent a hard landing on 1 May 2005. The aircraft, en route from Tromsø, was landing on Runway 05 when it experienced a veering wind which changed direction, resulting in an increased tail wind. The pilot attempted to counteract the increased descent rate by increasing to full throttle. This was not sufficient and the aircraft carried out a hard landing just inside the threshold, with the starboard landing gear collapsing. The aircraft slid on its belly along the runway for 650 meters (2,130 ft) and was damaged beyond repair. Widerøe permitted aircraft to land in the maximum certified wind conditions, a cross-wind of 18 meters per second (36 knots) and 5 meters per second (10 knots) tail wind. Twenty-five passengers and the three crew members were all transported to hospital, although there were no serious injuries. Widerøe enforced its strictest wind restrictions of any airport at Hammerfest after the accidents.

== Future ==
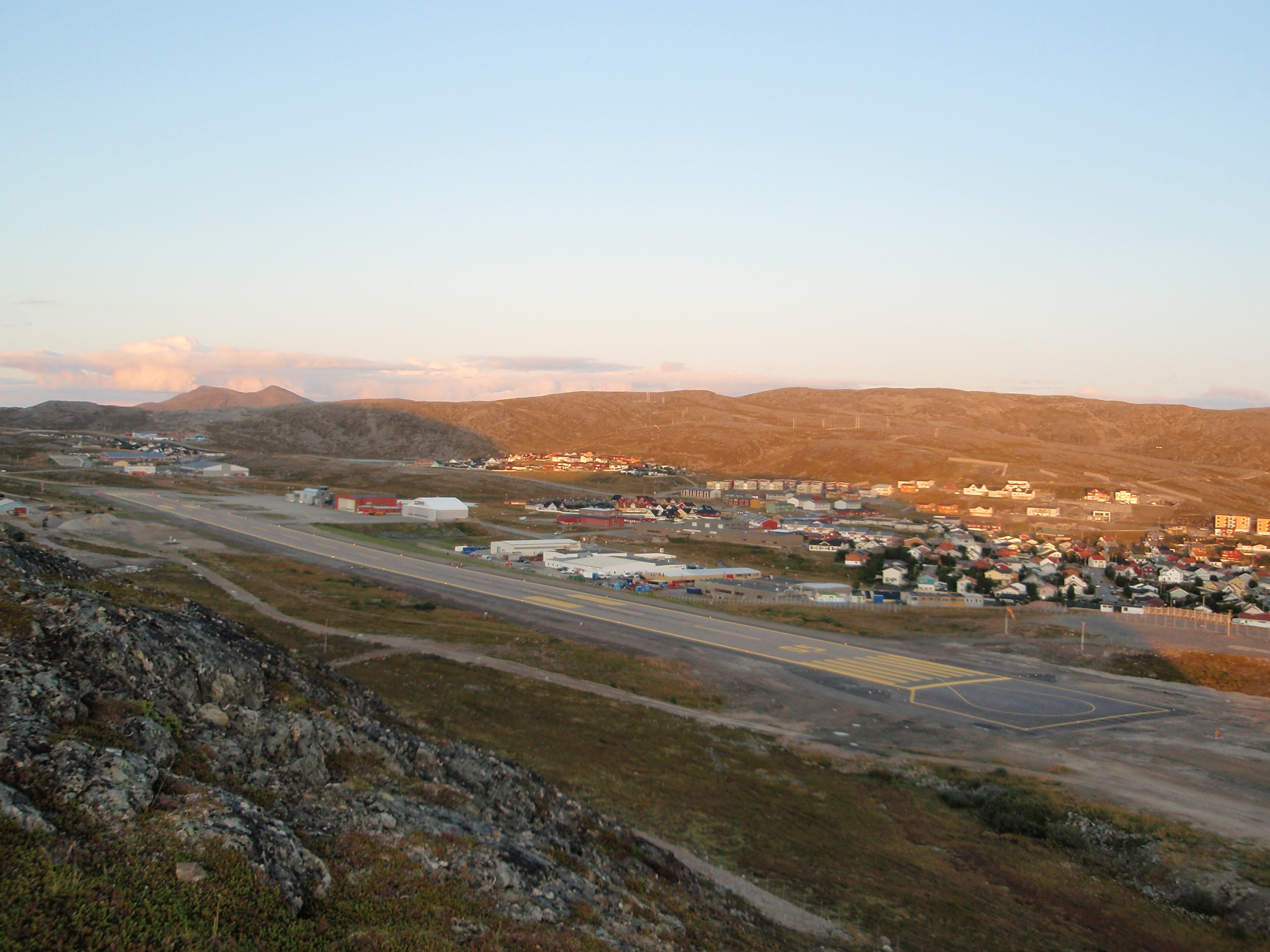
View of airport from a nearby hill

Avinor is considering building a new airport at Grøtnes, which would be built as reclaimed land 15 kilometers (9 mi) from Hammerfest. The terminal would be located on a peninsula while the runway would be built on a filling in the fjord. Avinor has studied two possible runway lengths, 1,199 meters (3,934 ft) and 1,550 meters (5,090 ft). The former would cause operational problems during winter for 50-passenger aircraft, while the longer alternative would allow for operation of 70-seat turboprops, such as the Dash 8-Q400 and the ATR 72. Avinor estimated in 2012 the costs of a new airport with a short runway to NOK 1.6 billion and of a longer runway to NOK 2.2 billion. Avinor's calculations give a negative net present value for society of between NOK 1.2 and 1.4 billion. The main gain comes from that the use of slightly larger aircraft will allow for cheaper flights.

A 2008 report from the Institute of Transport Economics, financed by Hammerfest and Kvalsund Municipalities, looked into two possible runway lengths of an airport at Grøtnes: 1,199 meters (3,934 ft) and 1,999 meters (6,558 ft). It concluded that the former would have a negative cost for society, while the latter would break even. The report concluded that the latter could allow for three daily direct flights to Oslo, and estimated the 2013 traffic, if airport had been built, at 190,000, of which 99,000 would have been generated by the petroleum industry. A major uncertainty in the model is the unknown activity of the petroleum industry in the future. A report by the Norwegian Meteorological Institute the same year concluded that the weather at Grøtnes was well-suited for an airport.

Avinor's proposal for National Transport Plan 2014–2023 discards building an airport at Grøtnes. One of Avinor's main concerns is that runway capable of Oslo flights could cannibalize the market for Alta Airport and Lakselv Airport, Banak and reduce traffic to a level that there would not be sufficient patronage at any airport to allow for two airlines to compete on the Oslo route. Instead Avinor recommends improving the road to Alta airport (138 kilometers (86 mi) driving distance). Such a road improvement, costing 540 M kr, is partly finished, partly still planned (as of 2018). A part of this route (E6 at Sennalandet) is sensitive to snow storms, causing risk of missed flights.

== Bibliography ==
- Arnesen, Odd (1984). På grønne vinger over Norge (in Norwegian). Widerøe's Flyveselskap.
- Melling, Kjersti (2009). Nordavind fra alle kanter (in Norwegian). Oslo: Pilotforlaget.
