= Helikopter Service Flight 165 =

Crash of a Sikorsky S-61 helicopter into the North Sea

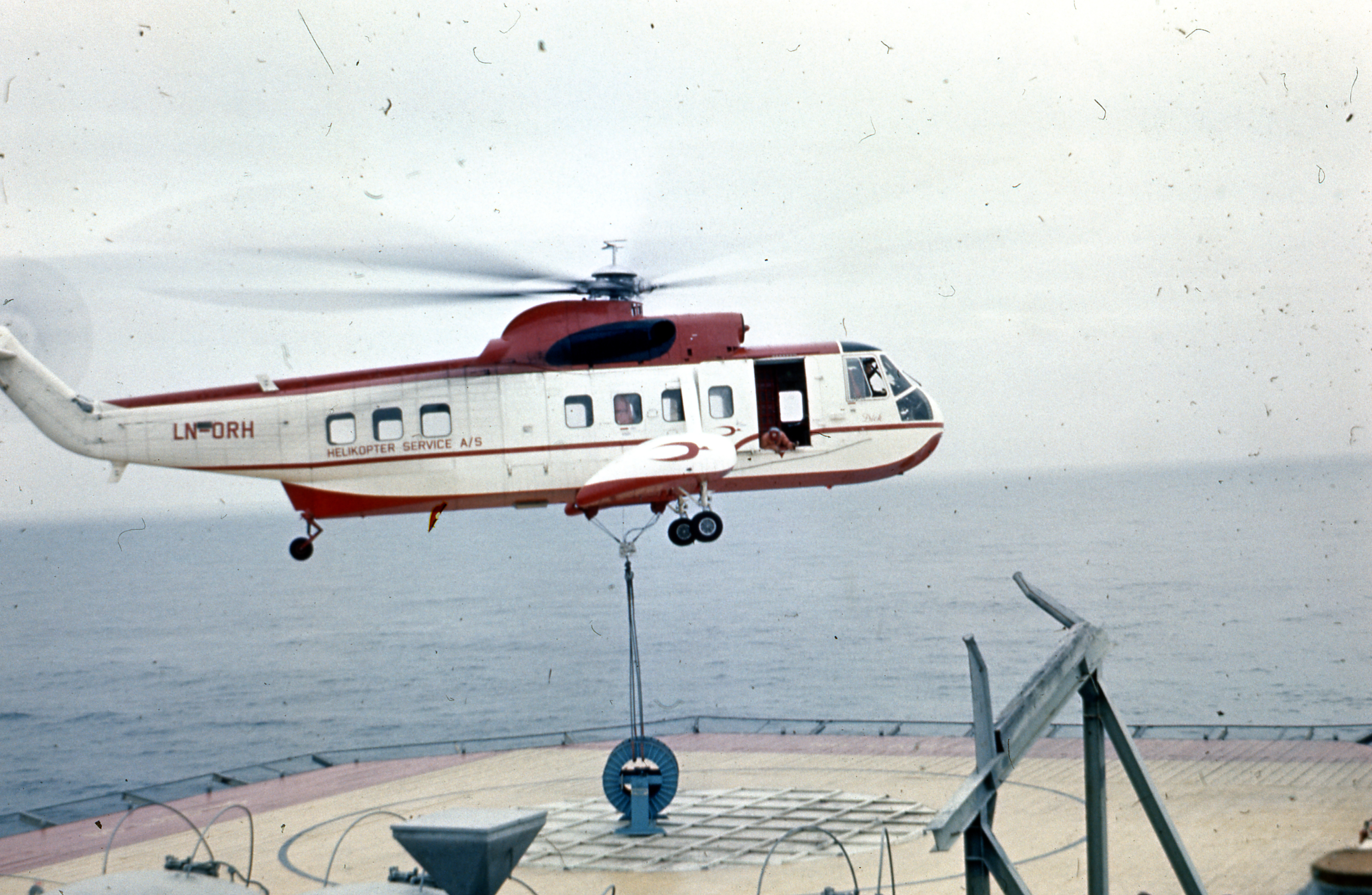
- A Helikopter Service Sikorsky S-61 similar to the accident aircraft

Accident
- Date: 26 June 1978
- Summary: Structural failure
- Site: North Sea, Norway; 61°01′N 002°48′E

Aircraft
- Aircraft type: Sikorsky S-61
- Operator: Helikopter Service
- Registration: LN-OQS
- Flight origin: Bergen Airport, Flesland, Bergen, Norway
- Destination: Statfjord A, North Sea, Norway
- Passengers: 16
- Crew: 2
- Fatalities: 18
- Survivors: 0

Helikopter Service Flight 165 was a crash of a Sikorsky S-61 helicopter into the North Sea, 78 nautical miles (144 km; 90 mi) northwest of Bergen, Norway, on 26 June 1978. The aircraft was en route from Bergen Airport, Flesland to Statfjord A, an offshore oil platform. The accident was caused by a fatigue crack in a knuckle joint, causing one of the rotor blades to loosen. All eighteen people on board were killed in the crash.

== Aircraft ==
The helicopter involved in the crash was a 2-year old Sikorsky S-61 that was manufactured in 1976 and had logged approximately 10,000 flight hours at the time of the incident.
