= CHC Helikopter Service Flight 241 =

2016 fatal crash landing in Norway

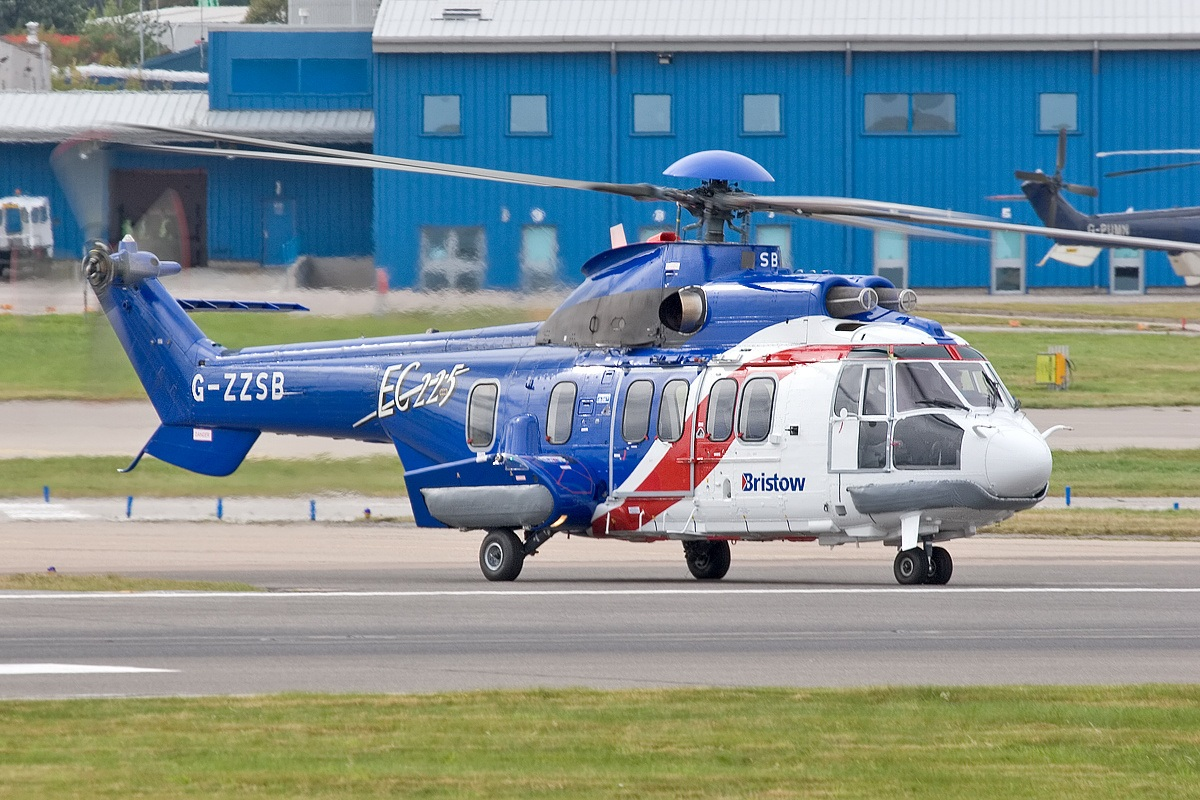
- A Eurocopter EC225LP Super Puma similar to the one that crashed

Accident
- Date: 29 April 2016
- Summary: Gearbox failure, rotor separation
- Site: Skitholmen, Øygarden, Hordaland, Norway; 60°27′8″N 4°55′49″E

Aircraft
- Aircraft type: Eurocopter EC225LP Super Puma
- Operator: CHC Helikopter Service
- ICAO flight No.: HKS241
- Call sign: HELIBUS 241
- Registration: LN-OJF
- Flight origin: Flesland Airport, Bergen, Norway
- Stopover: Gullfaks B platform, North Sea
- Destination: Flesland Airport, Bergen, Norway
- Occupants: 13
- Passengers: 11
- Crew: 2
- Fatalities: 13
- Survivors: 0

On 29 April 2016, a CHC Helikopter Service Eurocopter EC225 Super Puma helicopter, carrying oil workers from the Gullfaks B platform in the North Sea, crashed near the island of Turøyna, a Norwegian coastal island 36 kilometres (22 mi) from the city of Bergen. The main rotor assembly detached from the aircraft and the fuselage plummeted to the ground, exploding on impact. All 13 people, 11 Norwegians, one Briton and an Italian, on board were killed.

The subsequent investigation concluded that a gear in the main rotor gearbox had failed due to a fatigue crack that had propagated under-surface, escaping detection. Various safety recommendations were made, including for Airbus Helicopters, the current manufacturer of the type, to consider redesigning the affected gearbox.

== Aircraft ==
The accident aircraft was an EC225LP Super Puma helicopter, manufactured by Eurocopter (now named Airbus Helicopters), registration LN-OJF.

== Background ==
At 10:05 local time (UTC+2), HKS241 took off from Bergen's Flesland Airport, five minutes behind schedule. It arrived at the Gullfaks B platform on time and departed at 11:16, carrying two pilots and eleven passengers, employees and subcontractors of Norwegian oil company Statoil. It was scheduled to land back at Flesland Airport at 12:08.

== Crash ==
At 11:53, as the helicopter approached Sotra off the coast of Bergen, several witnesses observed the flight, stating that nothing was out of the ordinary until the sound suddenly changed and the helicopter started to sway. Moments later the main rotor assembly of the helicopter detached, causing a sudden drop in speed and altitude, as confirmed by flight telemetry. With all control lost, it crashed on the islet of Skitholmen between the islands of Turøyna and Toftøyna at 11:54:35 local time and exploded on impact. Most of the wreckage then slid off the islet into the sea. A video recording of the detached main rotor spinning to earth was made shortly afterwards. The rotor came to rest several hundred metres away on the island of Toftøy. According to flight tracking data, the time between the detachment of the rotor and the crash itself was only eleven seconds, with the helicopter diving 640 metres (2,100 ft) in that time.

=== Emergency response ===
At 11:55, local police in Bergen received multiple reports of a helicopter crash and initiated a full emergency response. At 11:59, the Joint Rescue Coordination Centre at Sola was notified by Avinor (Norway’s state-owned operator of civil airports and air navigation services) and began coordinated alerting. At 12:02, Bergen fire service mobilized divers and issued a full emergency alarm. By 12:09, the first fire and ambulance units had arrived at the crash site, 14 minutes after the initial report. At 12:10, additional fire service boats with divers were dispatched. At 12:23, the police incident commander arrived on scene, and military units were mobilized. At 12:32, the rescue vessel K.G. Jebsen reached the area and began search operations. At 12:33, police established an on-site command post, and additional fire and military vessels arrived between 12:44 and 12:45. At 14:03, health authorities terminated the rescue operation, concluding that there were no survivors..

== Crew and passengers ==
On its final flight the aircraft was carrying eleven passengers and two pilots. Authorities confirmed that eleven of the people on board were Norwegian, with one British passenger and one Italian crew member. The eleven passengers were employees of six different companies: Halliburton (four employees); Aker Solutions (three); and one employee each of Statoil, Schlumberger, Welltec and Karsten Moholt. On 2 May the names of all the crash victims were released.

== Investigation ==
The Norwegian Accident Investigation Board (AIBN) is responsible for investigating aviation accidents in Norway. The British Air Accidents Investigation Branch (AAIB) and French Bureau d'Enquêtes et d'Analyses pour la Sécurité de l'Aviation Civile (BEA) each dispatched a team of investigators to Norway to assist the AIBN in its investigation. Representatives from Airbus Helicopters and engine manufacturer Turbomeca were part of the BEA team. The European Aviation Safety Agency (EASA) also participated in the investigation.

The aircraft's combined cockpit voice recorder (CVR) and flight data recorder (FDR) was sent to the AAIB in the United Kingdom for data retrieval. Data were successfully downloaded on 1 May and sent back to the AIBN which confirmed that the received data were of good quality and useful for further investigation.

In May the BBC reported an earlier issue when the helicopter had returned to base in late April after the illumination of a cockpit warning light.

In a press conference on 3 May, the AIBN stated that the initial investigation and analysis of data from the combined FDR and CVR convinced them that pilot error could be ruled out and that there were no indications of any malfunction until one second before the end of the recording, which they assumed was the moment when the rotor detached. An AIBN spokesman said the accident was down to a technical fault and "not an accident caused by human error". Later that day Airbus Helicopters updated their press release bulletin with a request for verification of the correct installation of all main gearbox suspension bar attachments for the EC225LP. They also stated that "similar measures will be published shortly for the EC725AP in a specific ASB" (Alert Service Bulletin).

Within a week of the accident, an underwater sled with magnets had been developed and deployed to find small critical metal fragments from gearbox and bearings to support the investigations.

On 27 May the AIBN confirmed that scenarios under consideration included failure of epicyclic module, suspension bar (lift strut) attachment and MGB (gearbox) conical housing. On the same day Airbus Helicopters updated their press release bulletin and stated that in their opinion only failure of the attachment of a suspension bar could be assessed as probable based on the information available by that date, an opinion also stated by Airbus during a safety meeting on 20 May.

On 1 June the AIBN released an update to the preliminary investigation report including an urgent safety recommendation to the European Aviation Safety Agency. The recommendation was based on metallurgical examinations where signs of fatigue in parts of the second stage planet gear were found.

The gearbox had suffered "unkind treatment" (road accident) during transport in Australia, and was repaired before being mounted in LN-OJF. On 15 June, Airbus requested operators to check for metal residue in oil and to report unusual gearbox events.

On 28 June the AIBN released a new preliminary report where they stated that the most likely cause for the accident was a fatigue fracture in one of the second stage planet gears. They had not yet determined what initiated the fracture. AIBN draws similarity to the 2009 Bond Helicopters Eurocopter AS332 crash, also caused by a gearbox fracture. Whereas particles had been detected in the Scottish gearbox's oil prior to the crash, no such indication was present for the Norwegian gearbox. As of February 2017, AIBN continued investigations with no indication of when a conclusion could be made. Also in February 2017, EASA issued a notice for operators to investigate the oil cooler for 16NCD13 alloy from the gearbox.

On 28 April 2017 the AIBN released a new preliminary report with an update of the investigation progress one year after the accident. In this report they stated that the accident was a result of a fatigue fracture in one of the eight second stage planet gears in the epicyclic module of the main rotor gearbox and that the crack initiation appeared to be a surface micro-pit. The origin of the micro-pit was considered unknown at the time when the report was published. Also unknown is whether the fracture occurred momentarily or over several flight hours, and whether fracture fragments were spalled for detection by maintenance systems as happened in G-REDL. The issue is related to the airworthiness certificate of the aircraft.

On 5 July 2018 the AIBN released the final report, they determined the cause as the following: The accident was a result of a fatigue fracture in a second stage planet gear in the epicyclic module of the main rotor gearbox. Cracks initiated from a micro-pit at the surface and developed subsurface to a catastrophic failure without being detected. 12 recommendations were made, one of the recommendations stated that Airbus should take another look at the design of the main gearbox of the Super Puma. By September 2019, Airbus had replicated the root cause in testing.

== Reactions ==
Norwegian Prime Minister Erna Solberg described the crash as "horrible". King Harald V and Queen Sonja cancelled a visit to Sweden that was to have marked King Carl XVI Gustaf's 70th birthday.

== Aftermath ==
Shortly after the accident, oil companies and helicopter operators voluntarily grounded 130 similar helicopters until further notice, except for aircraft being used for search and rescue purposes. This was later followed by a grounding by the Civil Aviation Authority of Norway, specified to public transport flights and commercial air transport operations with EC225LP helicopters. Later that day the British Civil Aviation Authority issued a Safety Directive which grounded all EC225LP helicopters on the United Kingdom Civil Aircraft Register, or flying in United Kingdom airspace, except for aircraft being used for search and rescue purposes. On 30 April, Airbus Helicopters issued a Safety Information Notice expressing their support of the decision to put all commercial passenger flights with Super Puma helicopters of model EC225LP "on hold". Other versions of the Super Puma were not included in this decision.

On 1 May Airbus Helicopters stated in a press release that "Considering the additional information gathered during the last 48 hours, Airbus Helicopters' decision, at this stage, is to not suspend flights of any nature for the EC225LP". They did not specify the nature of the additional information leading to this decision.

On 11 May the Norwegian Civil Aviation Authority and the UK Civil Aviation Authority jointly agreed to extend the grounding, now also including Super Puma helicopters of model AS332L2. The decision was based on similarities between the two helicopter models.

On 2 June the Norwegian Civil Aviation Authority and the UK Civil Aviation Authority extended the grounding of EC225LP and AS332L2 helicopters, now also including search and rescue flights. The updated directives were results of a recommendation in the preliminary report published by the AIBN on 1 June. Later that day the European Aviation Safety Agency decided to prohibit all flights with EC225LP and AS332L2 helicopters in Europe. On 3 June the US Federal Aviation Administration (FAA) issued a directive prohibiting flights with EC225LP and AS332L2 helicopters.

The similar military Eurocopter AS532 Cougar and Eurocopter EC725 of Germany and Brazil were grounded around 7 June in response to the accident, and the South Korean Surion was grounded in July. (A Surion with similar rotor and gearbox suffered rotor separation in 2018.) By July 2016, 80% of the world fleet was on ground. The French military continued to operate its aircraft.

Statoil, who had contracted the helicopter in the crash, permanently ceased use of the Super Puma family of helicopters, even after some restrictions were lifted, and stated their plans were instead to use the Sikorsky S-92 helicopter to replace the Super Puma in contracts going forward.

As of January 2017, the H225 remained grounded in the UK and Norway, and some had returned to service in Asia. By 2019, 51 were in use, mostly for utility.

A claim by the widow of the British passenger for compensation under the Consumer Protection Act 1987 for a defective gearbox and helicopter is being pursued against the gearbox manufacturer Schaeffler and Airbus, led by Hugh James, solicitors of Cardiff and Balfour Manson of Edinburgh.

As of June 2021, a settlement out of court has been reached between Airbus and the next of kin; all the next of kin have received compensation.

== See also ==
Other North Sea helicopter incidents:

- 1986 British International Helicopters Chinook crash
- Bristow Helicopters Flight 56C (1995)
- Helikopter Service Flight 451 (1997)
- Bond Offshore Helicopters Flight 85N (2009)
