= Brae oilfield =

Scottish oil field

Brae oil field
- Location within North Sea
- Country: Scotland, United Kingdom
- Region: North Sea
- Location/block: 16/7a
- Offshore/onshore: offshore
- Coordinates: 58.7°N 1.3°E
- Operator: TAQA
- Partners: BP, Centrica, GDF Suez, Nippon Oil, TAQA

Field history
- Discovery: 1975 (North sector); 1976 (Central sector); 1977 (South sector)
- Start of production: 1983 (South); 1988 (North); 1989 (Central)

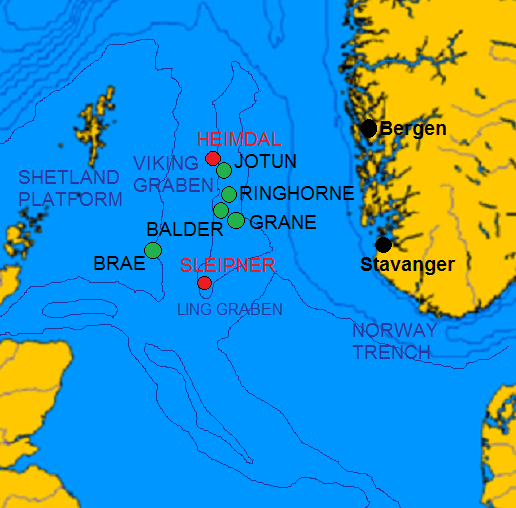
Utsira Formation oil fields. Position in the North Sea between Viking Graben and Norway Trench.

The Brae field is a Scottish oil field. The name comes from a Scots language word for hillside. The field was discovered in 1974 by well 16/7-1 drilled by a semi-submersible rig Odin Drill for operator Pan Ocean.

The Fields were operated by Marathon Oil from their inception until 2019 and are now operated by TAQA Bratani. They are located in UKCS block 16/7a. Three accumulations total about 70 million tonnes of oil liquids and a further 22 cubic kilometres of gas. The main platforms currently produce from underlying reserves, with regular infill drilling to identify and exploit undrained pockets in the Brae stratigraphy. A number of subsea tieback fields in the area produce through facilities on the platforms, extending their viability into the future. Gas is exported to St Fergus, Scotland via the SAGE pipeline system and oil is exported via the Forties system.

== Field reservoirs ==
The hydrocarbon reservoirs in the Brae field have the following properties.

Brae field reservoir properties
Field	Brae South	Brae Central	Brae North
Reservoir	Upper Jurassic sands		Upper Jurassic
Depth	12,000-13,500 ft		12,000 ft
Oil column	1,500 ft		
API gravity	37°	33°	47° (NGL)
Sulfur	0.64 %	0.64 %	
Gas Oil Ratio	1,400 scf/bbl		5,000 scf/bbl
Carbon dioxide	Up to 35%		8 %
Pressure & temperature	7,200 psi, 240 °F		7,000 psi, 240 °F
Bubble point pressure	3,688 psi		
Recoverable reserves, oil	267 million bbl; 40 million tonnes	65 million bbl; 9.0 million tonnes	204 million bbl; 21 million tonnes
Recoverable reserves, NGL	33 million bbl NGL	6 million bbl	
Recoverable reserves, gas	155 billion cubic feet		682 billion cubic feet; 22 billion cubic metres

== Topside facilities ==
The topsides for Brae Alpha (Brae South) were designed by Matthew Hall Engineering which was awarded the contract in August 1979. Initially there were facilities for 19 oil production wells, 14 water injection wells, two gas injection wells and 11 spare slots. The production capacity was 100,000 barrels of oil per day, 12,000 barrels of Natural Gas Liquids (NGL) per day and 4.25 million standard cubic metres of gas per day. There are two production trains each with three stages of separation with the first stage operating at the exceptionally high initial pressure, for that time, of 248 bar. Electricity generation was powered by four 25 MW Rolls-Royce SK-30 gas turbines. The topside accommodation was for 240 people. There were 14 topside modules and the topsides weight was 31,000 tonnes.

The topsides for Brae Bravo (Brae North) were designed by Matthew Hall Engineering which was awarded the contract in October 1983. Initially there were facilities for 12 oil production wells, three gas injection wells and 19 spare slots. The production capacity was 75,000 barrels of liquid hydrocarbons per day, and 11.3 million standard cubic metres of gas per day. There is a single production train with four stages of separation with the first stage operating at a pressure of 103. Electricity generation was powered by three 24 MW Rolls-Royce/GEC ERB-124C gas turbines. The topside accommodation was for 240 people. There were 21 topside modules and the topsides weight was 33,000 tonnes.

The topsides for East Brae were designed by Matthew Hall Engineering which was awarded the contract in October 1988. Initially there were facilities for 13 oil wells, and four gas injection wells and 13 spare slots. The production capacity was 120,000 barrels of liquid hydrocarbon per day, and 17.6 million standard cubic metres of gas per day. There is a single production train with three stages of separation with the first stage operating at a pressure of 102 bar. Electric power is provided from Brae A and Brae B by subsea cable. The topside accommodation was for 160 people. The topsides weight was 18,500 tonnes and may later have been extended to 20,000 tonnes. Fabrication details are shown in the table.

Brae platforms – construction
Installation	Fabrication contractor	Site	Installation date
Brae Alpha	McDermott Scotland	Ardersier	April 1982
Brae Bravo	McDermott Scotland	Ardersier	June 1987
Brae East	Trafalgar House Offshore Fabricators	Methil	May 1993

Brae platforms key facts
Platform	Brae Alpha	Brae Bravo	Brae East
Type	Steel jacket	Steel jacket	Steel jacket
Function	Drilling, production, accommodation	Drilling, production, accommodation	Drilling, production, accommodation
Coordinates	58°41’33”N 01°16’54”E	58°47’32”N 01°20’51”E	
Water depth	112 m	99.5 m	116 m
Jacket weight	18,600 tonnes	22,000 tonnes	20,000 tonnes
Legs	8	8	
Piles	36	36	
Topsides weight	32,000 tonnes	40,000 tones	18,500-20,000 tonnes
Accommodation	240	240	160
Well slots	46	34	13 + 13 spare
Wells planned	14 producers, 14 water injection, 2 gas injection	12 production; 3 gas injection	
Installation	June 1982	1987	May 1993
Production start	July 1983	1988	December 1993
Production stop (Cessation of Production, CoP)	2024	July 5, 2018	Application submitted 2015, approved 2017, CoP friday April 18 2025.
Decommission and removal	Starts in 2025 or 2026	Starts in april 2021	Starts in 2025 planned completion by end of 2028..

== Decommissioning ==
Several of the platforms used in the Brae field have reached a CoP (Cessation of Production) point, and are actively being or are scheduled for decommission and dismantling and removal.

Decommissioning of Brae East

Report by contractor RockRose Energy concludes that the decommission expects to consist of 20,326 tonnes of installations and 2,663 tonnes of pipeline. Of the installations, 100% (20,326 tonnes) is expected to be removed, and of the pipeline roughly 38,5% (740 tonnes) will be removed, thus leaving 1,923 tonnes of pipeline in situ. 90% of all materials of installations are calculated to be recycled, 5-10% to be reused and less than 5% to be disposed. Of the pipeline, 25% will be disposed and 75% will be recycled.

== See also ==
- Energy policy of the United Kingdom
- Energy use and conservation in the United Kingdom
