= Turøyna =

Island in Vestland, Norway

Turøyna Turøy (unofficial)
- Interactive map of the island

Geography
- Location: Vestland, Norway
- Coordinates: 60.4466°N 4.9163°E
- Area: 1.67 km^{2} (0.64 sq mi)
- Length: 2.5 km (1.55 mi)
- Width: 1 km (0.6 mi)
- Coastline: 7.63 km (4.741 mi)
- Highest elevation: 74.5 m (244.4 ft)
- Highest point: Turøyvarden

Administration
- Norway
- County: Vestland
- Municipality: Øygarden Municipality

Turøyna is an island in Øygarden Municipality in Vestland county, Norway. The 1.67-square-kilometre (0.64 sq mi) island lies just west of the islands of Toftøyna and Misje. Prior to 1964, the island was part of the old Herdla Municipality. Then from 1964 until 2020 it was part of Fjell Municipality.

About 100 people live on this island, which has a road connection to the mainland via the Turøy Bridge which connects to the island of Toftøyna. The road then continues over a series of bridges connecting a string of islands to each other and to the city of Bergen. The postcode is 5365 Turøy.

The island is a good spot for birdwatching and hosts an ornithological station.

The island received some notoriety because of a 2016 helicopter crash that killed all 13 people on board, mainly oil workers. The chopper was flying from the Gullfaks oil field to Bergen.

== See also ==
- List of islands of Norway
