= CHC Helikopter Service =

Norwegian division of CHC Helicopter Corporation

IATA	ICAO	Call sign
–	HKS	HELIBUS
- Founded: 1956
- Hubs: Stavanger Airport, Sola
- Focus cities: Bergen Airport, Flesland, Brønnøysund Airport, Brønnøy, Florø Airport, Kristiansund Airport, Kvernberget
- Fleet size: 28
- Parent company: CHC Helicopter
- Headquarters: Stavanger
- Website: http://www.chc.ca

CHC Helikopter Service, previously CHC Norway, CHC Helikopter Service and Helikopter Service is the Norwegian division of CHC Helicopter Corporation. The airline was an independent company until 1999. It operates primarily to oil platforms on the Norwegian continental shelf in the North Sea and the Norwegian Sea, with crew change, infield shuttle and search and rescue operations. Though the global headquarters are in Richmond, B.C., Canada, the company has its main base at Stavanger Airport, Sola.

The company also operates out of the airports Bergen Airport, Flesland, Brønnøysund Airport, Brønnøy, Florø Airport and Kristiansund Airport, Kvernberget in addition to the oil installations Ekofisk, Oseberg, Statfjord and Heidrun. It also operated a public service obligation on the route Bodø-Værøya and the national rescue helicopter service for some years.

== History ==
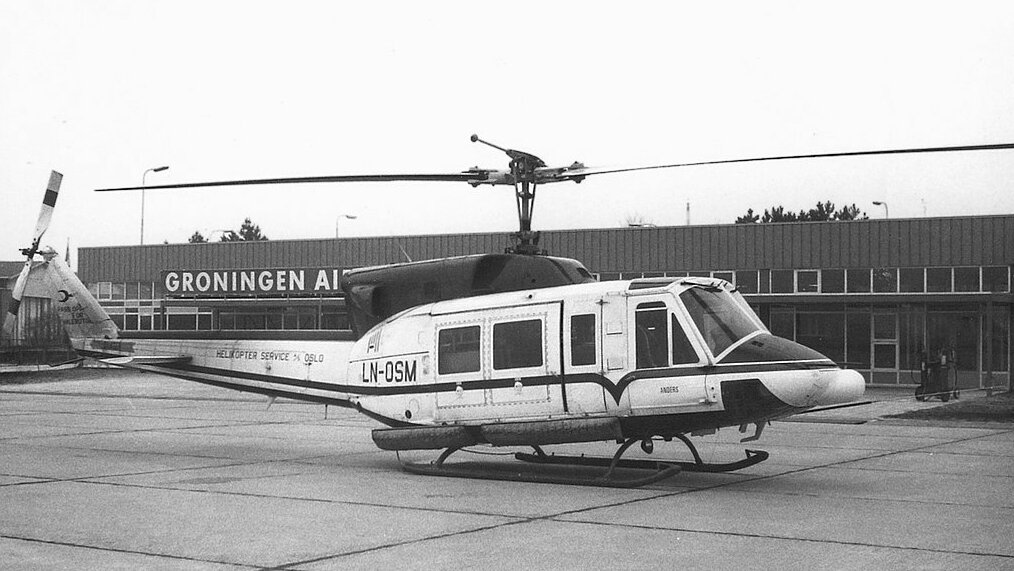
Bell 212 at Groningen Airport Eelde

The company started out operating under the name Scancopter-Service A/S in 1956, using various small helicopters. But in 1966 the first steps in the Norwegian oil exploration started, and the company acquired two Sikorsky S-61 helicopters and at the same time changed its name to Helikopter Service. By 1980 the company was operating 20 such helicopters. The airline had by then been acquired by Scandinavian Airlines and Fred. Olsen.

In 1982 the company started to renew its fleet, introducing the Eurocopter AS332 Super Puma and later the Eurocopter Super Puma 2. In 1993 it also started operating the Eurocopter AS365 Dauphin with possibilities for search and rescue purposes.

In 1996 the company changed its name to Helicopter Services Group and bought the British Bond Helicopters, its Australian subsidiary Lloyd Helicopters and later the South African Court Helicopters.

CHC Helicopter bought Helikopter Services Group in 1999 and in 2000 the company changed name to CHC Helikopter Service. In 2000 the company sold the subsidiaries Lufttransport to Norwegian Air Shuttle and Heliflyg to Osterman Helicopter.

On 2 April 2009 the name was again changed to CHC Norway.

On 26 October 2010 the name was changed back to the current CHC Helikopter Service.

== CHC EMS and SAR services ==
- Norwegian Search and Rescue – CHC provides private Search and Rescue services in the Norwegian North Sea but acts in concert with government SAR operations. The CHC SAR fleet includes three offshore based AS 332L1, along with an EC225 at Statoil's Statfjord field, which can be converted from inter-rig shuttle role to SAR duty role within 15 minutes. Several of the Super Pumas in CHC's Norwegian fleet are prepared for the same quick change to SAR configuration.

== Fleet ==
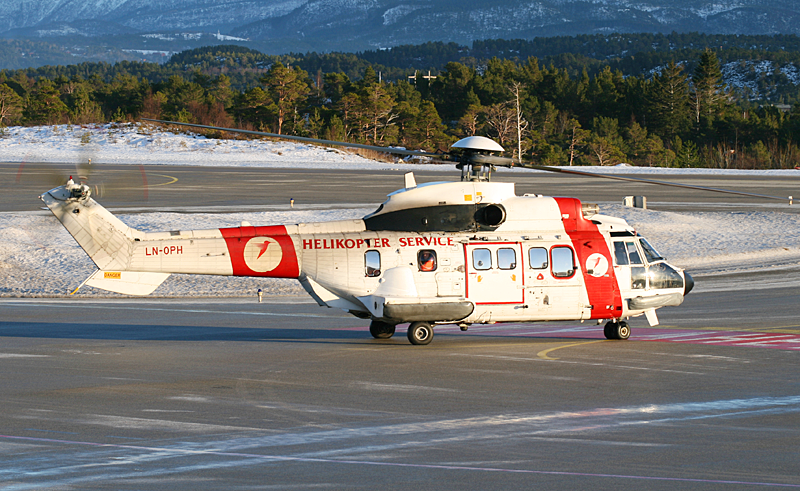
A Helikopter Service Eurocopter AS332 Super Puma in the pre-CHC livery

- 6 Eurocopter AS332L Super Puma
- 2 Eurocopter AS332L1 Super Puma
- 8 Eurocopter AS332L2 Super Puma 2
- 10 Sikorsky S-92A
- 7 Eurocopter EC 225 LP

== Accidents and incidents ==
- On 8 September 1997 LN-OPG, an AS332 L1 Super-Puma, suffered a catastrophic main gearbox failure while flying from Brønnøysund to the Norne oil field and crashed to the sea, killing all 12 aboard. Eurocopter accepted some but not all of the AAIB/N recommendations. Eurocopter's reply can be found in Appendix F to the report (page 265 in the pdf).
- On 29 April 2016 LN-OJF, an EC225 LP Super Puma, crashed at Turøy in the Bergen archipelago en route to Bergen Airport, Flesland, from the Gullfaks B platform in the North Sea. The helicopter was carrying 11 passengers and 2 crew members, but none survived the crash. Eyewitnesses have reported that everything seemed normal until there was a sudden change in the sound, before the main rotor detached and the aircraft fell down. Due to the crash, all commercial flights – but not search and rescue flights – by EC225 helicopters were grounded immediately by both Norwegian and British civil aviation authorities.
