= SCAT-I =

SCAT-I (Special CATegory I) is an instrument landing system for aircraft, based on Differential GPS.

== How it works ==
It is developed under project management by Avinor, the Norwegian airport administration. It is installed on several short runway airports for domestic operation in Norway. It requires special equipment to be installed in the aircraft, and allows precision landings in bad visibility, something that is important on short runways where bad weather including snow storms are common.

== History ==
The system was operational for the first time in 2007, first installed at Brønnøysund, then at several other airports. As of 2013 it is installed at 21 regional airports in Norway.
