= Namsos Airport =

Namsos Airport Namsos lufthavn

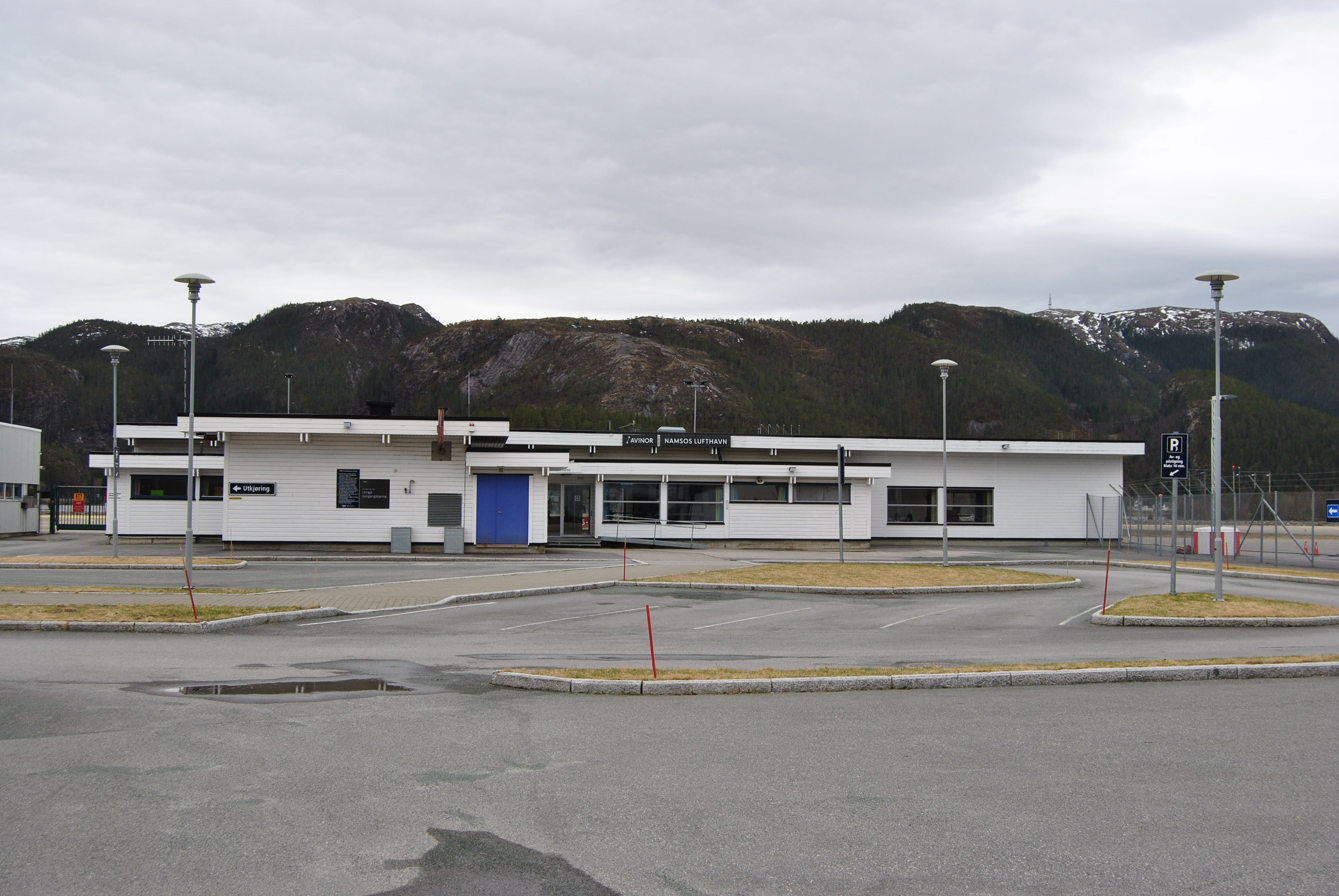
- IATA: OSY; ICAO: ENNM

Summary
- Airport type: Civil
- Operator: Avinor
- Serves: Namsos
- Location: Høknesøra, Namsos, Norway
- Elevation AMSL: 2 m / 8 ft
- Coordinates: 64°28′20″N 011°34′43″E
- Website: avinor.no

Map
- Location in Norway OSY (Trøndelag)

Runways
Direction	Length		Surface
Direction	m	ft	Surface
07/25	935	3,068	Asphalt

Statistics (2014)
- Passengers: 29,091
- Aircraft movements: 3,364
- Cargo (tonnes): 8

Namsos Airport (Norwegian: Namsos lufthavn; IATA: OSY, ICAO: ENNM) is a regional airport located at Høknesøra along the Namsen river, just outside the town of Namsos in Namsos Municipality in Trøndelag county, Norway. The airport is served with Dash 8 aircraft from Widerøe on public service obligation contracts with the Ministry of Transport and Communications. It had 25,684 passengers in 2011 and is owned and operated by Avinor. There has been one large disaster associated with the airport. In 1993, Widerøe Flight 744 hit ground in darkness during approach, causing six deaths out of 19 on board.

== Airlines and destinations ==
Airlines	Destinations
Widerøe	Mo i Rana, Rørvik, Sandnessjøen, Trondheim

== Statistics ==
Annual passenger traffic
Year	Passengers	% Change
2025	32,270	▲14.1%
2024	28,276	▲4.7%
2023	27,002	▼ -28.3%
2022	37,656	▲25.9%
2021	29,917	▲30.0%
2020	23,016	▼ -47.7%
2019	43,974	▲2.4%
2018	42,934	▲15.2%
2017	37,260	▼ -17.4%
2016	45,106	▼ -1.2%
2015	45,641	
