= Norne oil field =

Norwegian oil and gas field in the Norwegian Sea

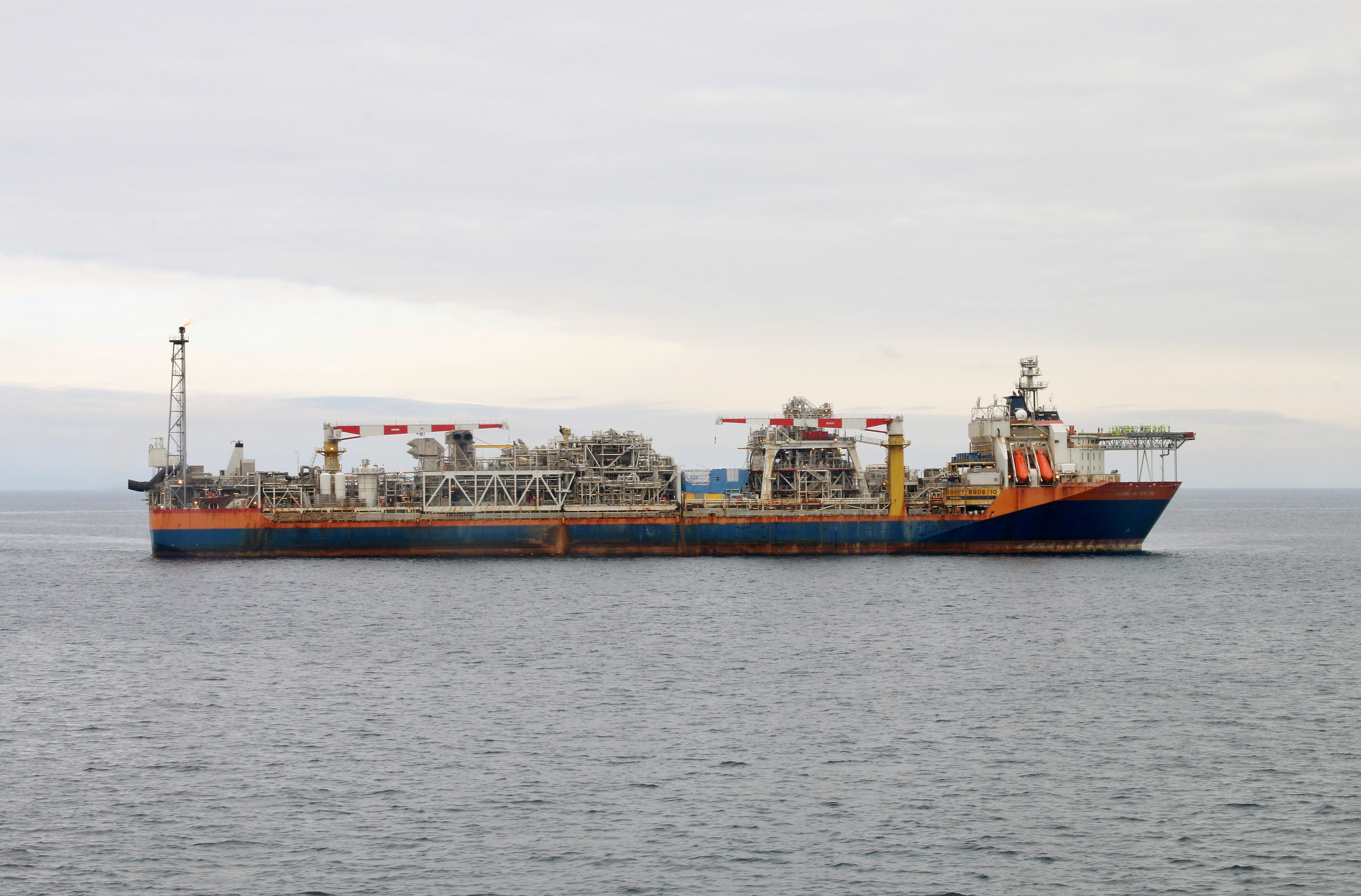
- Norne FPSO

- Location within Norway
- Country: Norway
- Region: Norwegian Sea
- Blocks: 6608/10, 6608/11
- Offshore/onshore: offshore
- Coordinates: 66°0′49.35″N 8°4′26.48″E
- Operator: Statoil
- Partners: Statoil; Petoro; Eni

Field history
- Discovery: 1992
- Start of production: 1997

Production
- Current production of oil: 70,000 barrels per day (~3.5×10^{6} t/a)
- Producing formations: Jurassic sandstones

Norne is an oil field located around 80 kilometres (50 mi) north of the Heidrun oil field in the Norwegian Sea. The sea depth in the area is 380 metres (1,250 ft).

Norne lies in a licence which was awarded in 1986, and embraces blocks 6608/10 and 6608/11. The nearby Alve field, as well as the Urd field, is comingling with the Norne. 6507/3-1 Alve will be tied to Norne for processing and transport. It travels through the Norne Gas Export Pipeline and the Åsgard Transport trunkline via Kårstø north of Stavanger to continental Europe, and makes use of shuttle tankers.

Norne is mainly owned by Petoro AS, Equinor Energy AS, and DNO Norge AS.

== Development ==
The Alve find led to the discovery of the Norne oil and gas field which was proven in 1992 and brought on stream in 1997. The field has been developed with a production and storage vessel, connected to six subsea wellhead templates. Flexible risers carry the wellstream up to the vessel, which rotates around a cylindrical turret moored to the seabed. Risers and umbilicals are also connected to the turret. The ship has a processing plant on deck and storage tanks for stabilised oil.

During the beginning phase of development, injection water was untreated seawater. As development progressed, plans were made to replace portions of untreated seawter with produced water.

== Production ==
Production began from Norne in the Norwegian Sea on 6 November 1997. The Norne field produces around 70,000 barrels per day (11,000 m^{3}/d) of medium density, low sulphur, waxy North Sea crude oil.

Production in Norne has been in decline during the past decades. Norne faces issues such as aging equipment and reservoir souring. Originally, the shutdown of Norne was scheduled for 2014. Statoil, now known as Equinor, announced in 2015 that they were considering to extend production until 2030.

Natural gas has also been exported from Norne since 2001.

== Reservoir ==
The Norne reservoir is in the Lower to Middle Jurassic sandstones. Oil is mainly found in the Ile and Tofte formations, and gas in the Garn formation. The reservoir is found at a depth of 2,500 metres (8,200 ft) below sea level.

== Recovery strategy ==
The oil is produced with water injection as drive mechanism. Gas injection ceased in 2005 and all gas was planned to be exported. In order to avoid rapid pressure depletion in the gas cap, gas will be injected for an extended period of time.

== See also ==
- List of oil fields
