= Central Hålogaland =

Area in Northern Norway

Coordinates: 68.30°N 16.23°E

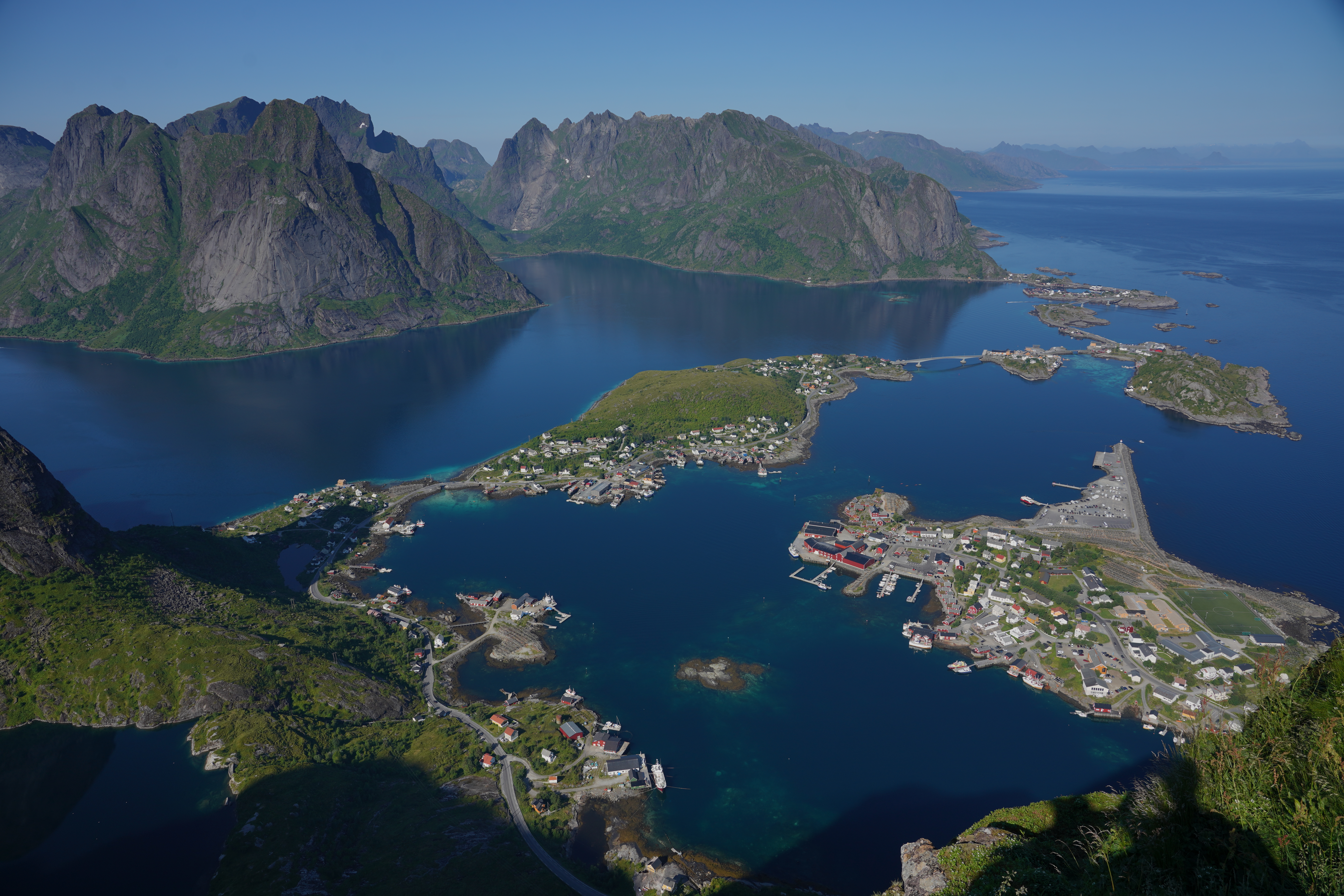
Reine

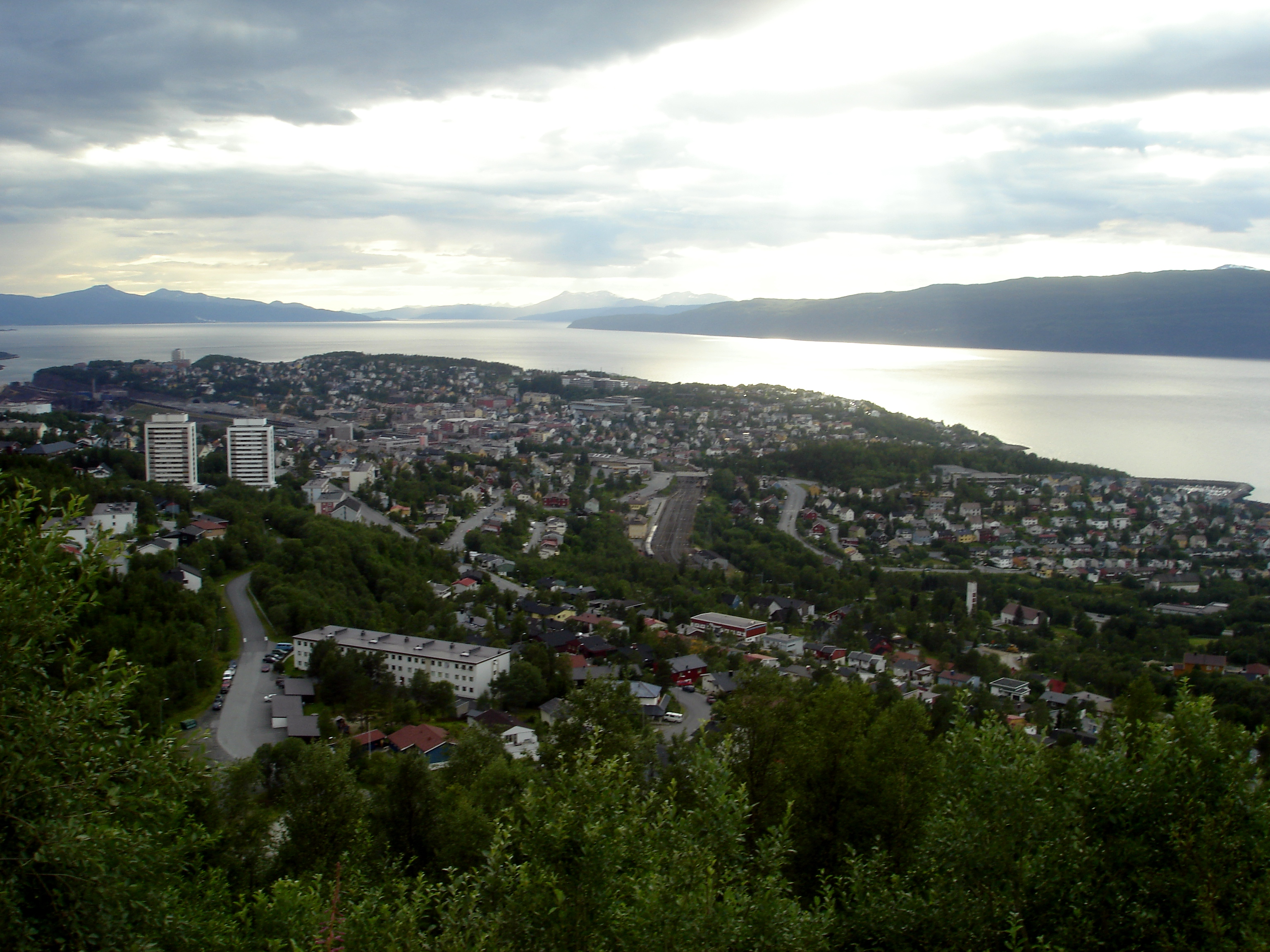
Narvik

Central Hålogaland (Norwegian: Midtre Hålogland) is a district of Northern Norway constituting the traditional districts of Ofoten, Lofoten, Vesterålen, and southern Troms. It has a population of 117,000, with the largest towns being Harstad (23,000) and Narvik (18,000). Smaller towns which act as regional centers include Svolvær, Sortland, and Leknes. The district covers 23 municipalities and an area of 11,600 square kilometers (4,500 sq mi). The Norwegian Police Service has Central Hålogaland as a police district with head office in Harstad.

== Transport ==
The main road through the district is European Road E10, which runs from the Norway–Sweden border through Narvik Municipality and Evenes Municipality and on through Lofoten, and E6, which runs north–south. Harstad/Narvik Airport, Evenes is the region's only primary airport, although there are five additional regional airports, Narvik, Svolvær, Stokmarknes, Leknes, Værøy and Røst. Narvik is connected to the Swedish railway network with the Ofoten Line. The district has 17 ports and 14 ferry services.
