= Andøya Airport =

Andøya Airport Andøya lufthavn
- IATA: ANX; ICAO: ENAN

Summary
- Airport type: Joint (public and military)
- Operator: Avinor
- Location: Andenes, Andøy, Norway
- Elevation AMSL: 46 ft / 14 m
- Coordinates: 69°17′33″N 16°08′39″E
- Website: avinor.no

Map
- Map of Norway

Runways
Direction	Length		Surface
Direction	m	ft	Surface
03/21	1,672	5,486	Asphalt
14/32	2,468	8,097	Asphalt

Statistics (2014)
- Passengers: 48,625
- Aircraft movements: 3,208
- Cargo (tonnes): 1

Andøya Airport (Norwegian: Andøya lufthavn; IATA: ANX, ICAO: ENAN) is a domestic airport in the village of Andenes in Andøy Municipality in Nordland county, Norway. It is situated on the northern tip of the island of Andøya. The airport is the civilian sector of Andøya Air Station and is operated by the state-owned Avinor. The airport consists of two runways, respectively 2,468 and 1,672 meters (8,097 and 5,486 ft) long, of which only the former is now used, and served 48,254 passengers in 2012. Widerøe operates public service obligation (PSO) flights to Bodø, Tromsø, Stokmarknes and Harstad/Narvik, while Norwegian Air Shuttle operates seasonal flights to Oslo.

Construction of the air station started in 1952 to host the 333 Squadron. Civilian operations started in 1964, when Scandinavian Airlines System (SAS) started flights to Oslo. Widerøe started serving the airport as part of the regional network in 1972, with SAS withdrawing four years later. Widerøe originally used the Twin Otter, replacing it with the Dash 7 from 1981 and the Dash 8 between 1993 and 1995. Routes have been subject to PSO flights since 1997; these have been operated by Norwegian Air Shuttle for part of 2003 and by Coast Air for part of 2006 og 2007, and otherwise by Widerøe.

== History ==
Andøya Air Station was built with North Atlantic Treaty Organization funds as a combined Supreme Allied Commander Europe and Supreme Allied Commander Atlantic project as a base for maritime surveillance. Construction started in 1952 and all installations not required to be physically located at the air station were placed at Skarsteindalen, 12 kilometers (7 mi) away. Andøya became the base for the 333 Squadron, which initially operated the Grumman HU-16 Albatross. These were replaced by the Lockheed P-3 Orion in 1969. Construction and further expansion of the air station resulted in the villages of Haugnes being expropriated. Construction was prohibited from 1953, but the expropriation was not carried out until 1971.

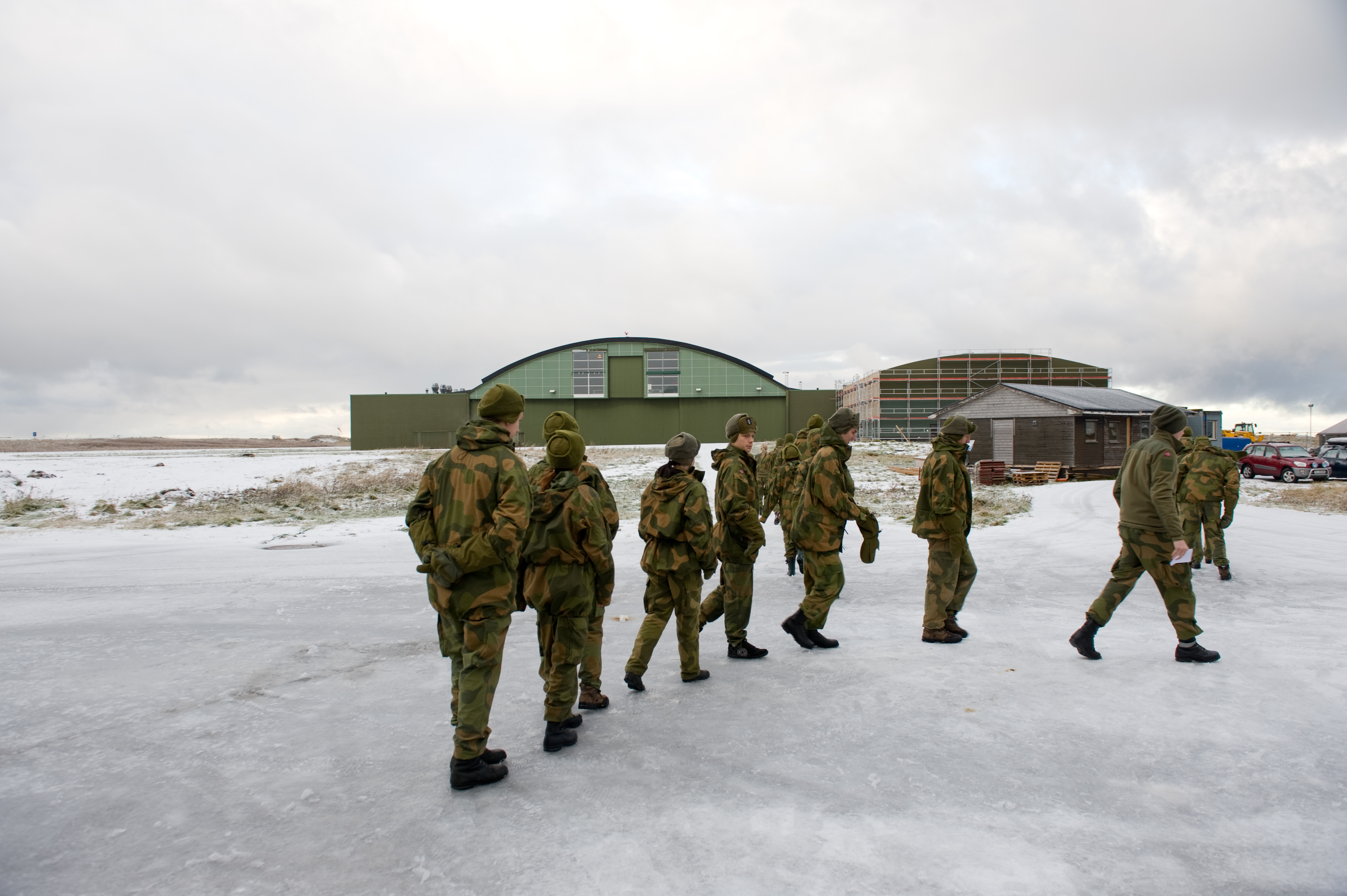
Soldiers in front of a hangar of Andøya Air Station

With the establishment of the air station, plans arose to take advantage of the infrastructure for civilian flights. The airport's location made it suitable to serve Vesterålen, although it was located at the northern tip of the archipelago. SAS started serving Andenes from 1964 with their 56-seat Convair Metropolitans, which consisted of three night flights with intermediate stops at Bodø Airport and Bardufoss Airport before continuing to Oslo Airport, Fornebu. The night flights caused difficulties corresponding with the flights as there was a limited ferry and bus service during night. The Sud Aviation Caravelle was introduced on Northern Norway flights from 1965 and later these were replaced with the Douglas DC-9.

It soon proved difficult to provide sufficient patronage to keep operations profitable. With the opening of a network of short take-off and landing airports elsewhere in Central Hålogaland in 1972, Widerøe started serving the airport using the de Havilland Canada Twin Otter. SAS retained a small number of Oslo flights until 1976, when they withdrew from the service. At the time the military chartered aircraft for their own needs, so Andøy Mayor Johan Kleppe took initiative to coordinate the civilian and military routes, without the military supporting the proposal.

Parliament decided in 1982 that Andenes would be the base for operating helicopters offshore to oil installations off Troms. However, when operations commenced operations flew out of Tromsø Airport because of the difficult weather conditions at Andenes. Operations were moved to Hammerfest Airport following the discovery of Snøhvit. Widerøe introduced the larger, 50-seat de Havilland Canada Dash 7 in 1981, followed by the Dash 8 between 1993 and 1995. The routes were made subject to public service obligations with the Ministry of Transport and Communications from 1 April 1997. Widerøe won the initial tender. A proposal to make Andenes an international airport was launched in 2000, which also proposed that the airport change its name to Lofoten Airport. Unlike the two airports in Lofoten, Leknes Airport and Svolvær Airport, Helle, Andenes is able to handle jetliners. The name change was rejected by interests in Lofoten, which accused Vesterålen of stealing the more well-known Lofoten name.

From 1 April 2003 Norwegian Air Shuttle took over the route from Andenes to Bodø and Tromsø. However, they decided to terminate their operations with the Fokker 50, and thus also serving Andenes, to concentrate their efforts on becoming a low-cost carrier. From 1 January 2004 the route was served by Widerøe, who won the extraordinary tender. The state paid NOK 68 million for 27 months, up 25 percent from the Norwegian bid, including a service from Tromsø to Lakselv Airport, Banak. The tender for the three years starting on 1 April 2006 was won by Coast Air, which used an ATR-42 on the route. Coast Air was not able to make money on the route and abandoned the PSO contract from 1 April 2007. Widerøe won the subsequent tender and started flights from that date. Norwegian started irregular scheduled flights to Oslo Airport, Gardermoen, using the Boeing 737-800 from June 2012.

== Facilities ==
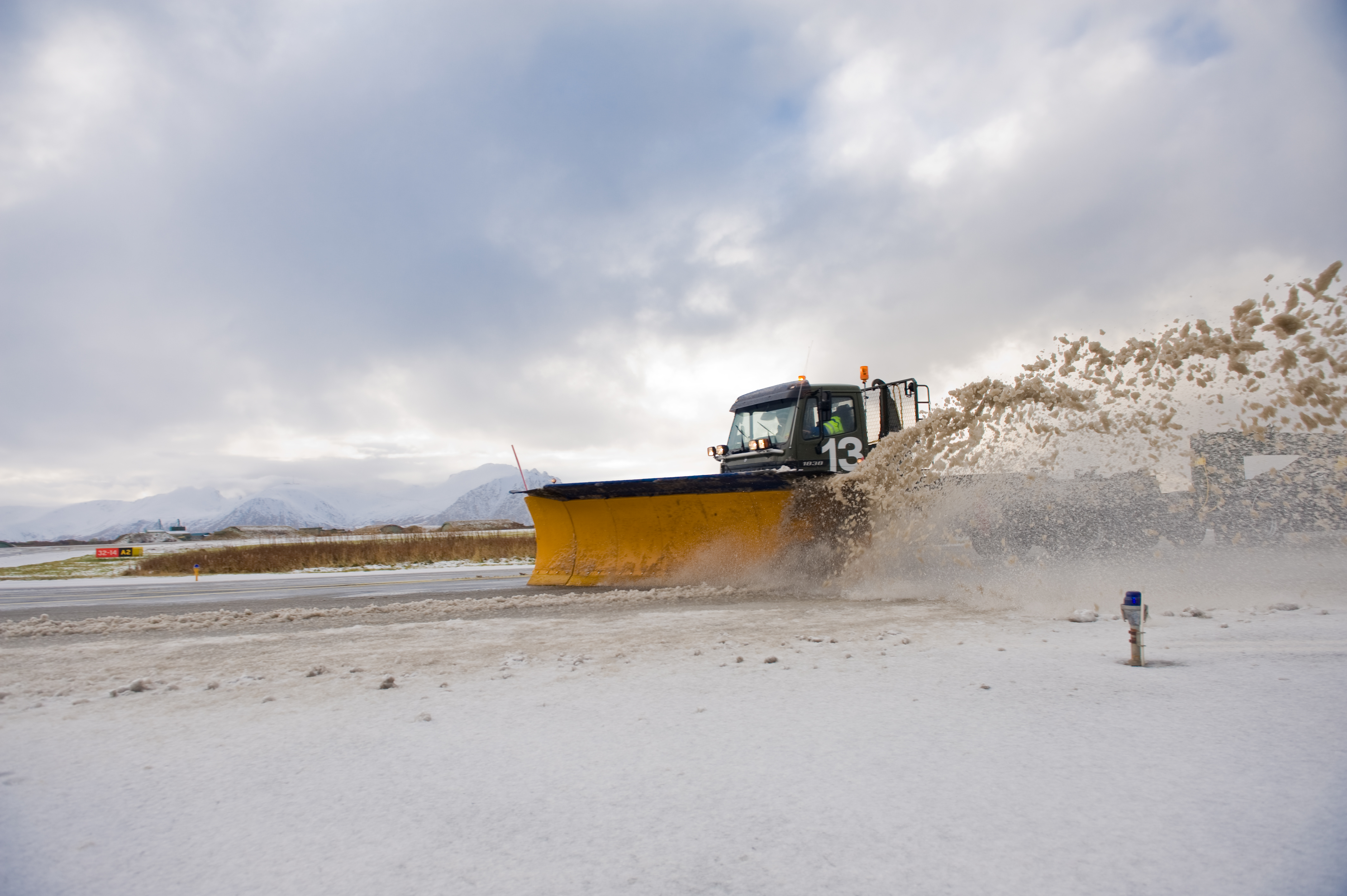
Snowplow

The airport is located at an elevation of 13 meters (43 ft). It has two asphalt runways; only one of which is operative in 2025. The main runway is 3,002 by 45 meters (9,849 by 148 ft) and aligned 14–32, but only has a declared length of 2,467 meters (8,094 ft); the no longer used crosswind runway is 1,671 by 45 meters (5,482 by 148 ft) and aligned 03–21. It was closed in 2015 and the runway surface was marked with X marks, denoting its unused state.

Runways 14 and 32 are equipped with instrument landing system category I. The airport is located two minutes' drive from Andenes. Taxis, car rental and free parking spaces are available at the airport. The airport had an operating deficit of 34 million Norwegian krone in 2012.

== Airlines and destinations ==
Widerøe serves Andenes with Dash 8 aircraft on public service obligations with the Ministry of Transport and Communications. These routes are mixed with commercial services and operate to Bodø, Harstad-Narvik, Svolvær and Tromsø. Norwegian Air Shuttle flies irregularly to Oslo, typically during holidays and summer. The airport handled 48,625 passengers, 3,208 aircraft movements and 1 tonne of cargo in 2014.

Airlines	Destinations
Norwegian Air Shuttle	Seasonal: Oslo
Widerøe	Bodø, Harstad/Narvik, Stokmarknes, Tromsø

== Statistics ==
Annual passenger traffic
Year	Passengers	% Change
2025	79,193	▲19.0%
2024	66,531	▲2.6%
2023	63,844	▼ -3.0%
2022	66,829	▲37.0%
2021	48,792	▲5.2%
2020	46,390	▼ -16.1%
2019	55,277	▼ -7.1%
2018	59,512	▼ -3.2%
2017	61,510	▲6.2%
2016	57,945	▲1.8%
2015	56,897	

== Accidents and incidents ==
All four people on board were killed when a private Cessna 172 crashed west of the airport just after take-off on 31 July 1988. The accident took place 4.5 kilometers (2.8 mi) west of the airport in a cliff, 250 meters (820 ft) altitude.
