= Narvik Airport, Framnes =

Narvik Airport, Framnes Narvik lufthavn, Framnes
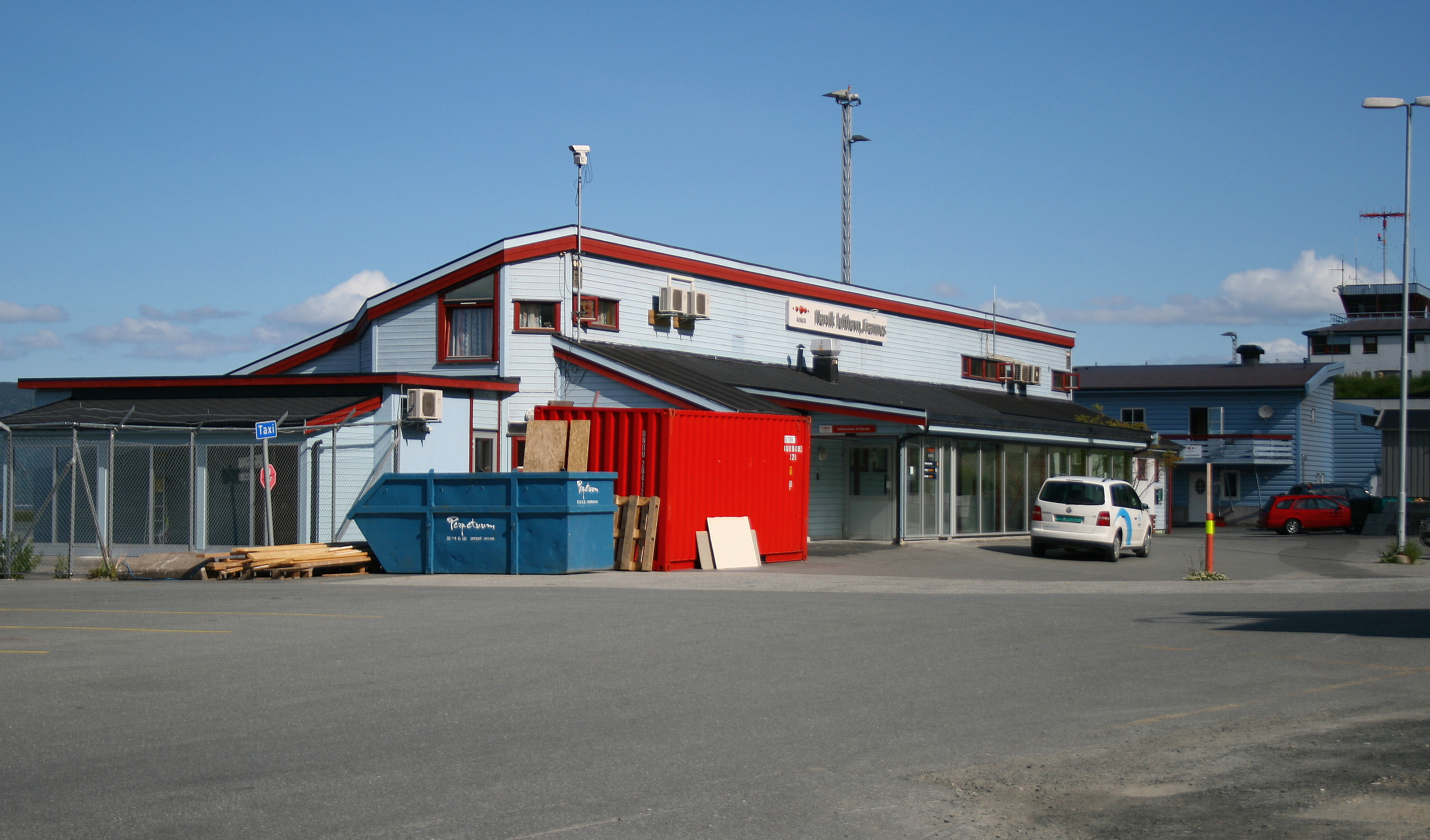
- IATA: NVK; ICAO: ENNK

Summary
- Airport type: Public
- Operator: Avinor
- Serves: Narvik
- Location: Framnes
- Closed: April 2017
- Elevation AMSL: 29 m / 95 ft
- Coordinates: 68°26′09″N 017°23′17″E
- Website: avinor.no/en/airport/narvik-airport/

Map

Runways
Direction	Length		Surface
Direction	m	ft	Surface
01/19	965	3,166	Asphalt

Statistics (2014)
- Passengers: 27,142
- Aircraft movements: 2,586
- Cargo (tonnes): 0.6

Narvik Airport, Framnes (Norwegian: Narvik lufthavn, Framnes; IATA: NVK, ICAO: ENNK) is a former public regional airport closed down in 2017 in Narvik Municipality in Nordland county, Norway. It was located at Framnes in the town of Narvik, along the Ofotfjorden. It was operated by the state-owned Avinor and consisted of a 965-meter (3,166 ft) runway aligned 01–19 (roughly north–south).

The airport closed on 1 April 2017, due to the construction of the new Hålogaland bridge (opened December 2018) which shortened the journey to the larger Harstad-Narvik Airport, Evenes, making that the primary airport for Narvik.

== History ==
Until its closure, the airport was served by Widerøe, who operate a public service obligation route to Bodø. Narvik is now only served by the primary Harstad/Narvik Airport, Evenes, capable of jetliner operations. The airport handled 27,142 passengers in 2012.

Narvik was served by a seaplane service from 1935 to 1939 and from 1946 to 1971. Planning of Evenes started during the 1950s, but from the late 1968 Narvik Municipality proposed building both a regional and primary airport. Framnes was completed in 1972, a year before Evenes, and scheduled services started on 1 October 1975. The terminal building was completed in 1986 and the airport was nationalized in 1997. Widerøe has operated at the airport since the opening, except from 2003 to 2006, when the airport was served by Kato Air.

=== Seaplanes ===
The first scheduled airline service to Narvik was carried out by Norwegian Air Lines in 1935. Using a Junkers W 34, they flew a coastal route between Bergen and Tromsø, which landed in Narvik. The route continued until 1939 when it was terminated because of the break-out of World War II. The route resumed in 1946, when it was flown with a Junkers Ju 52. The water aerodrome consisted of a floating pier in the port. Widerøe started flying to Narvik in 1951, at first flying via Svolvær to Bodø. DNL's successor Scandinavian Airlines System (SAS) terminated its seaplane routes the following year, leaving them to Widerøe, who operated the Noorduyn Norseman and de Havilland Canada Otter.

The first scheduled airline service to Harstad and Narvik was carried out by Norwegian Air Lines (DNL) in 1935. Using a Junkers W 34, they flew a coastal route between Bergen and Tromsø, with stops in Narvik and Harstad. The route continued until 1939 when it was terminated because of the break-out of World War II. The route resumed in 1946, when it was flown with a Junkers Ju 52. DNL also operated a direct service between Harstad and Narvik. Harstad's water aerodrome was located at Klubbeskjæret in the town center. For a while there were discussion of moving it to Harstadbotn, but this was not carried out. Seaplane routes were only conducted during the summer. Widerøe started flying to Narvik in 1951, at first flying via Svolvær to Bodø. DNL's successor Scandinavian Airlines System (SAS) terminated its seaplane routes the following year, leaving them to Widerøe, who operated the Noorduyn Norseman and de Havilland Canada Otter. Patronage at Harstad was 1,143 passengers in 1946, 2,725 the following year and 8,037 in 1959. The latter year saw 6,139 passengers at Narvik.

=== Establishment ===
The Harstad–Narvik area had been proposed as a potential location of Bardufoss Air Station when it had been planned during the late 1930s. However, Bardufoss has been selected because of its favorable strategic location. About 1950 discussions started regarding construction of an airport between Bodø and Tromsø. In Narvik work started on planning an airport in Evenes, which was approved by Narvik Municipal Council in February 1951. However, it also considered several closer locations, such as Herjangfjellet, Elvgårdsmoen, Håkvikvleira and Vidrek. An important issue for Narvik was the necessary construction of the Rombak Bridge to cut travel time to Evenes. The civilian sector at Bardufoss Airport opened in 1956. It served all of Tromsø as well as Ofoten. Travel time to Bardufoss was three hours (120 km and a ferry) from Narvik.

A government committee which had received a mandate to consider future airports, concluded with a report on 16 December 1964. It recommended that nine more primary airports be built and that Evenes and Kristiansund Airport, Kvernberget receive top priority. The committee noted SAS' introduction of the Sud Aviation Caravelle and wanted to build a network of airport capable of handling jetliners. It argued for Evenes as a good location that despite it being slightly closer to Harstad, Narvik would be closer to Bardufoss and have an advantage of it as a reserve airport. At a common meeting for eleven southern Troms and Ofoten municipalities on 11 May 1965, these unanimously supported Evenes. They establish a committee, which issued a report to the government in June 1966, which concluded that it would be possible to have an airport completed by 1968.

The airlines Braathens SAFE and Widerøe both launched an alternative proposal whereby the government instead should build a network of short take-off and landing airports. When Håkon Kyllingmark was appointed Minister of Transport and Communications in 1965, he placed the primary airport construction plan on hold and instead focused on construction of regional airports. This caused local interest for airports at Kvæfjordeidet and Vidrek to resume, after initiative from Widerøe. Several commercial interest organizations in Narvik supported an airport at Vidrek, while their Harstad counterparts supported an airport at Evenes. Narvik Municipal Council continued to support Evenes until it was instead proposed as a regional airport. It voted in February 1968 to continue to support Evenes as a primary airport, but also work for a local airport in Narvik.

Planning of an airport at Vidrek started in 1968 and in early 1969 the company A/S Narvik Flyplass was established. Meetings were held with the ministry, where it was determined that planning would have to wait until further reports were made on the regional network in Nordland. Kyllingmark stated in 1970 that he intended to allow Narvik to receive a regional airport. The break-through for Narvik Airport came when the mining company LKAB, which exports its ore through Narvik, needed a place to dump earthwork. An agreement was made with the municipality whereby it received the earthwork free of charge and placed at a suitable location at Framneslia, a lot which was owned by LKAB. The municipal council approved in July 1971 plans to build a short take-off and landing airport at Framneslia, based on a thirteen-year free lease of the land. Government permission for a general aviation airport was issued in early 1972 and technical approval from the Civil Aviation Administration was granted in August. Harstad/Narvik Airport, Evenes opened on 30 June 1973.

At first Framnes only served general aviation, but in late 1974 Parliament approved that the airport be used for subsidized regional aviation. The airport started with scheduled traffic on 1 October 1975. The original terminal building was a residential house which had been in the way for the runway and moved to a suitable location. Initial services were provided by Widerøe using a 19-passenger de Havilland Canada Twin Otter with flights provided to Bodø Airport; Harstad/Narvik Airport, Evenes; Svolvær Airport, Helle and Stokmarknes Airport, Skagen. The airport handled 19,135 passengers in 1985.

=== Operational history ===
A new terminal opened on 24 September 1986; it cost 7 million Norwegian krone (NOK), of which the state paid seventy-five percent, with the remainder financed by local governments. The new terminal building was 400 square meters (4,300 sq ft) and the control tower was expanded with 100 square meters (1,100 sq ft). The airport lacked a suitable garage for a fire truck, so a municipal fire engine had to be driven 2.4 kilometers (1.5 mi) to the airport every time a plane landed. The upgraded terminal allowed Widerøe to start serving Narvik with the 50-passenger de Havilland Canada Dash 7.

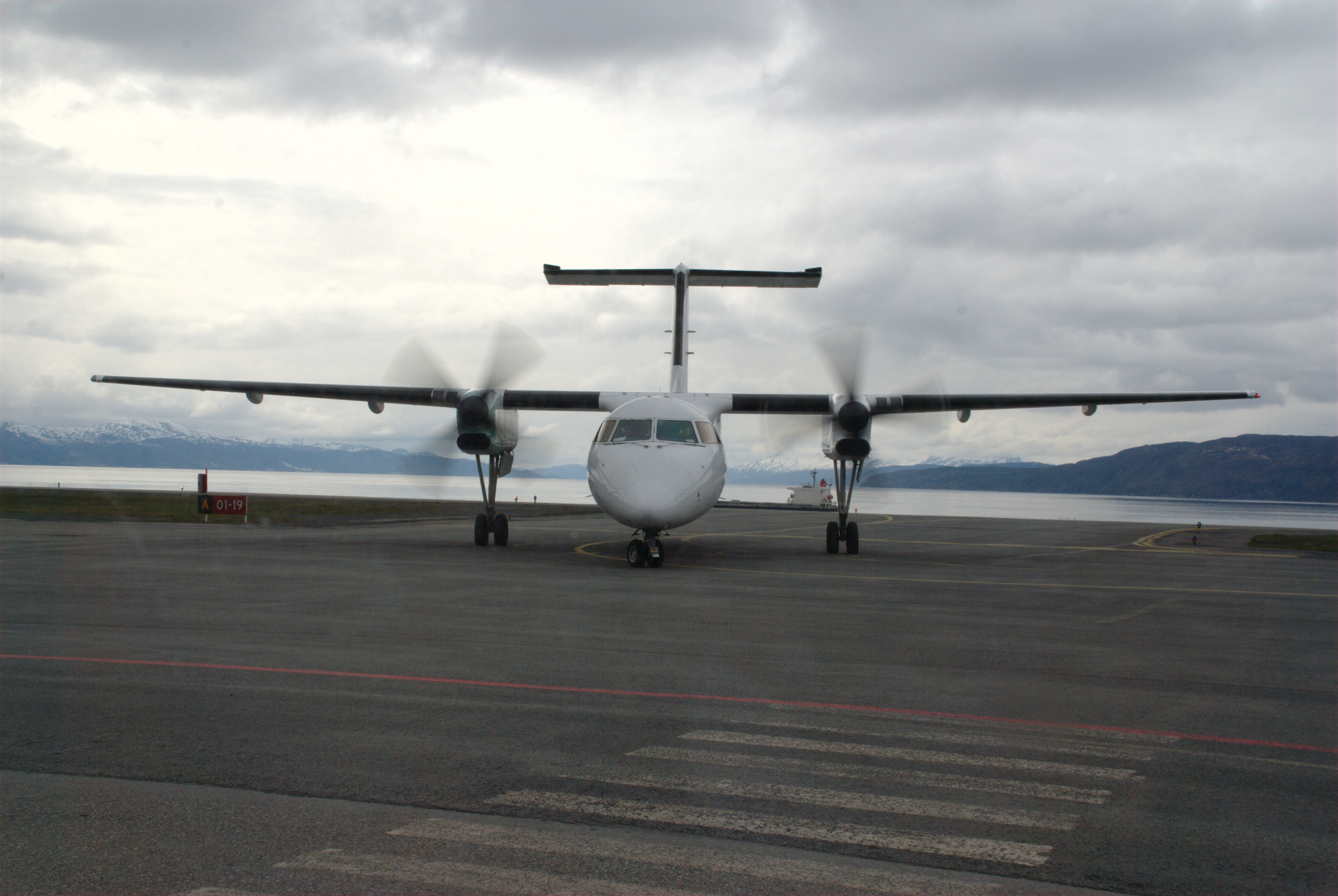
Widerøe Dash 8-100

Widerøe replaced their older aircraft with the Dash 8 between 1993 and 1995. The airport was taken over by the state and the Civil Aviation Administration (later renamed Avinor) on 1 January 1997. Routes to Narvik Airport, Framnes have been subject to public service obligation since 1 April 1997, with the first contract being won by Widerøe. In the third tender, which became operational on 1 April 2003, Kato Air won the bid to operate the route from Narvik to Bodø. In March 2004 they resigned the contract from 8 March 2005. The ministry subsequently issued a new tender, but no airlines bid. The ministry was forced to renegotiate the contract with Kato Air, which resulted in the subsidy for the last thirteen months increasing from NOK 8 to 18.2 million. The result of Kato Air taking over the route in 2003 was that the patronage had been halved. Widerøe recaptured the Narvik contract from 1 April 2006.

In the tender valid from 1 April 2012 the routes to Svolvær, Leknes, Røst and Narvik were awarded to Danish Air Transport. Two weeks before operations were to start the Civil Aviation Authority of Norway stated that DAT did not meet the safety requirements, resulting in Widerøe instead being awarded the contract. The main issue resolved around the installation of the SCAT-I landing system; the time from the tender was completed until the operations started was eight weeks, but it took eight months to install the system. DAT stated that the introduction of the SCAT-I-system had resulted in a de facto monopoly for Widerøe. DAT sued the ministry for breaching the tender rules but lost the case.

== Closure ==
The government supported the construction of Hålogaland Bridge on the condition that Narvik Airport, Framnes be closed. Minister of Transport Magnhild Meltveit Kleppa stated in 2010 that money saved on having to upgrade the runway safety area and the operating deficits of the airport and subsidies for the route could help finance the bridge, estimated to cost NOK 2.2 billion. The bridge will reduce the travel distance by road from Narvik to the Evenes by 18 kilometers (11 mi) and 20 minutes, to 61 kilometers (38 mi) and 55 minutes. Construction of the bridge started on 18 February 2013 and was scheduled for completion near the end of 2017. Widerøe, the only operator, decided to move the only line at Framnes (from Bodø) to Evenes airport on 1 April 2017, and increase its traffic there. The new bridge actually opened in December 2018.

== Facilities ==
The runway is 965 meters (3,166 ft) and aligned 01–19, roughly north–south. The airport is located at Framnes, 2 kilometers (1.2 mi) from the town center. The airport has taxis, car rental and paid parking for 40 vehicles.

== Airlines and destinations ==
At the time of closure, the airport's only service was a Widerøe route to Bodø, operated using the Dash 8-100. The route was subsidized through a public service obligation with the Ministry of Transport and Communications. The airport handled 27,142 passengers, 2,586 aircraft movements and 0.6 tonnes of cargo in 2014.

== Accidents and incidents ==
- On 29 September 2004, an Algerian asylum seeker attacked the Kato Airline Flight 605 pilots with an axe. He boarded the Bodø-bound flight at Framnes and attacked the pilots mid-flight, attempting to take control over the aircraft. He was overpowered by two passengers and the first officer was able to take control over the aircraft, which was only 30 meters (100 ft) from the ground. Security check was not yet implemented at small domestic airports in Norway at the time.
