= Narvik Airport =

Narvik Airport may refer to one of the following airports serving Narvik in Nordland, Norway:

- Harstad/Narvik Airport, Evenes, the primary airport
- Narvik Airport, Framnes, a minor airport which closed in April 2017
