= Harstad/Narvik Airport =

International airport in Nordland, Norway

Harstad-Narvik Airport Harstad-Narvik lufthavn

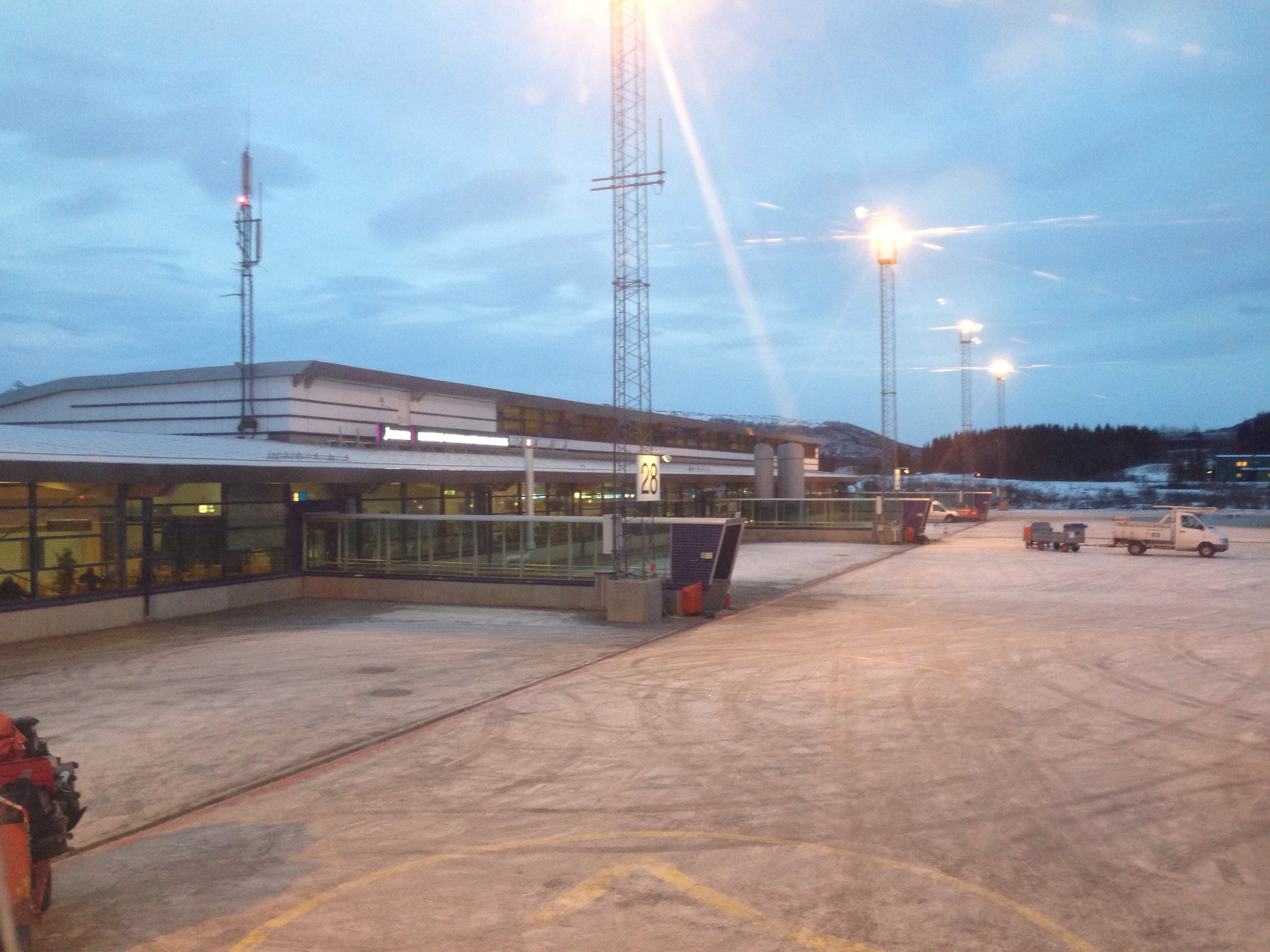
- IATA: EVE; ICAO: ENEV

Summary
- Airport type: Joint (public and military)
- Operator: Avinor
- Serves: Harstad and Narvik, Norway
- Location: Evenes, Nordland, Norway
- Elevation AMSL: 26 m (85 ft)
- Coordinates: 68°29′20″N 016°40′42″E
- Website: avinor.no

Map
- Location within Norway

Runways
Direction	Length		Surface
Direction	m	ft	Surface
17/35	2,812	9,213	Asphalt

Statistics (2018)
- Passengers: 762,747
- Aircraft movements: 11,942

Harstad-Narvik Airport (Norwegian: Harstad/Narvik lufthavn; IATA: EVE, ICAO: ENEV) is an international airport located in Evenes Municipality in Nordland county, Norway. The airport serves the towns of Harstad and Narvik. It is co-located with Evenes Air Station of the Royal Norwegian Air Force. The civilian sector is owned and operated by the state-owned Avinor and handled 654,977 passengers in 2013. Evenes has a 2,812-meter (9,226 ft) runway, a parallel taxiway and a terminal with five gates. The airlines with daily scheduled services are Norwegian Air Shuttle, Scandinavian Airlines (SAS) and Widerøe. Destinations with daily services are Oslo, Trondheim, Bodø, Tromsø and Andenes. Evenes is the only primary airport in Central Hålogaland and its catchment area for Oslo-bound flights includes Lofoten and Vesterålen.

Seaplane services to Harstad and Narvik started in 1935. Planning of an airport started in the 1950s. Several locations were considered, including building separate airports for each town. Consensus for Evenes was reached in the mid-1960s, but construction was postponed to prioritize local airports, which resulted in Narvik also receiving Narvik Airport, Framnes. Evenes opened on 30 June 1973, initially with a 1,600-meter (5,200 ft) runway. It was extended in 1977, after the military decided to establish the air station. SAS Commuter served Harstad-Narvik from 1990 to 2002, and from 1994 competition was introduced on the Oslo route with the entry of Braathens SAFE. Norwegian started services in 2003 and launched international scheduled services from 2013.

== History ==
=== Seaplanes ===
The first scheduled airline service to Harstad and Narvik was carried out by Norwegian Air Lines (DNL) in 1935. Using a Junkers W 34, they flew a coastal route between Bergen and Tromsø, with stops in Narvik and Harstad. The route continued until 1939 when it was terminated because of the outbreak of World War II. The route resumed in 1946, when it was flown with a Junkers Ju 52. DNL also operated a direct service between Harstad and Narvik. Harstad's water aerodrome was located at Klubbeskjæret in the town center. For a while there were discussion of moving it to Harstadbotn, but this was not carried out. Seaplane routes were conducted only during the summer. Widerøe started flying to Narvik in 1951, at first flying via Svolvær to Bodø. DNL's successor Scandinavian Airlines System (SAS) terminated its seaplane routes the following year, leaving them to Widerøe, who operated the Noorduyn Norseman and de Havilland Canada Otter. Patronage at Harstad was 1,143 passengers in 1946, 2,725 the following year and 8,037 in 1959. The latter year saw 6,139 passengers at Narvik.

The Harstad–Narvik area had been proposed as a potential location of Bardufoss Air Station when it had been planned during the late 1930s. However, Bardufoss has been selected because of its favorable strategic location. About 1950 discussions started regarding construction of an airport between Bodø and Tromsø. A survey conducted in 1951 looked into the possibilities of building an airport for Harstad at Skånland, Rødmyra, Tennvassåsen and Kjøtta. In Narvik work started on planning an airport in Evenes, which was approved by Narvik Municipal Council in February 1951. However, it also considered several closer locations, such as Herjangfjellet, Elvgårdsmoen, Håkvikvleira and Vidrek. The civilian sector at Bardufoss Airport opened in 1956. It served all of Tromsø as well as Ofoten. Travel time to Bardufoss was three hours from Narvik and six hours from Harstad.

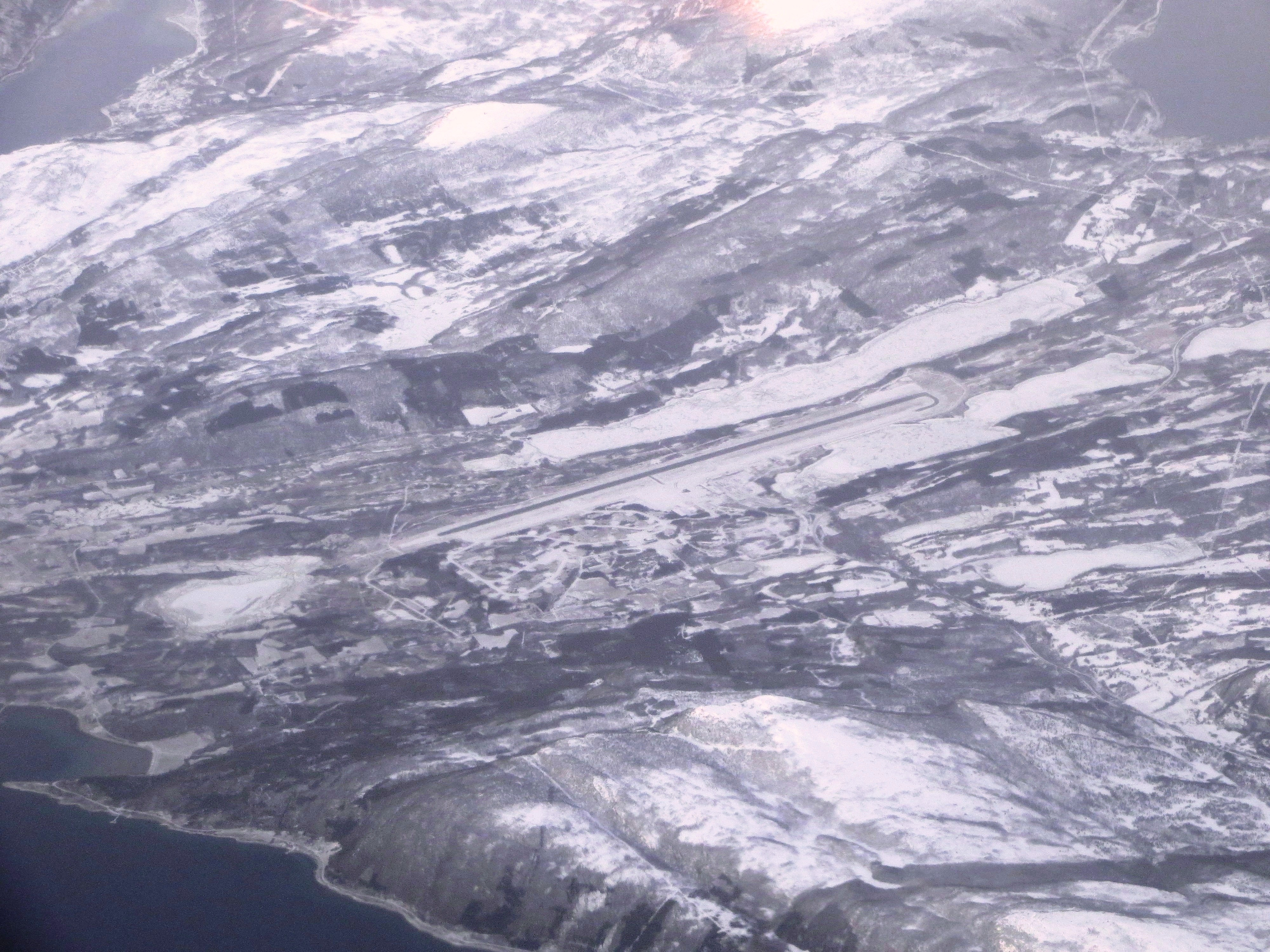
Aerial view of the airport

=== Establishment ===
Two engineering students at the Norwegian Institute of Technology concluded in 1957 that a new airport in Harstad would cost 3 million Norwegian krone (NOK). This was followed up with a meeting between representatives from Harstad and Narvik. Harstad and the surrounding municipalities proposed in 1960 an airport at Evenskjer in Evenes, on condition that the Tjeldsund Bridge be built, allowing the island of Hinnøya to be connected to the mainland. For Narvik a similar consideration was the necessary construction of the Rombak Bridge. The municipalities of Harstad, Ibestad, Kvæfjord and Skånland created the Southern Troms Intermunicipal Airport Committee in 1963. It concluded that the airport for the Harstad area and Vesterålen should be built at Kvæfjordeidet, while Narvik would be best served with a motorway to Bardufoss. Narvik Municipality conducted surveys at Herjangsfjellet in 1962 and 1963.

A government committee which had received a mandate to consider future airports, concluded with a report on 16 December 1964. It recommended that nine more primary airports be built and that Evenes and Kristiansund Airport, Kvernberget receive top priority. The committee noted SAS' introduction of the Sud Aviation Caravelle and wanted to build a network of airport capable of handling jetliners. It argued for Evenes as a good location that despite it being slightly closer to Harstad, Narvik would be closer to Bardufoss and have an advantage of it as a reserve airport. At a common meeting for eleven southern Troms and Ofoten municipalities on 11 May 1965, these unanimously supported Evenes. They establish a committee, which issued a report to the government in June 1966, which concluded that it would be possible to have an airport completed by 1968.

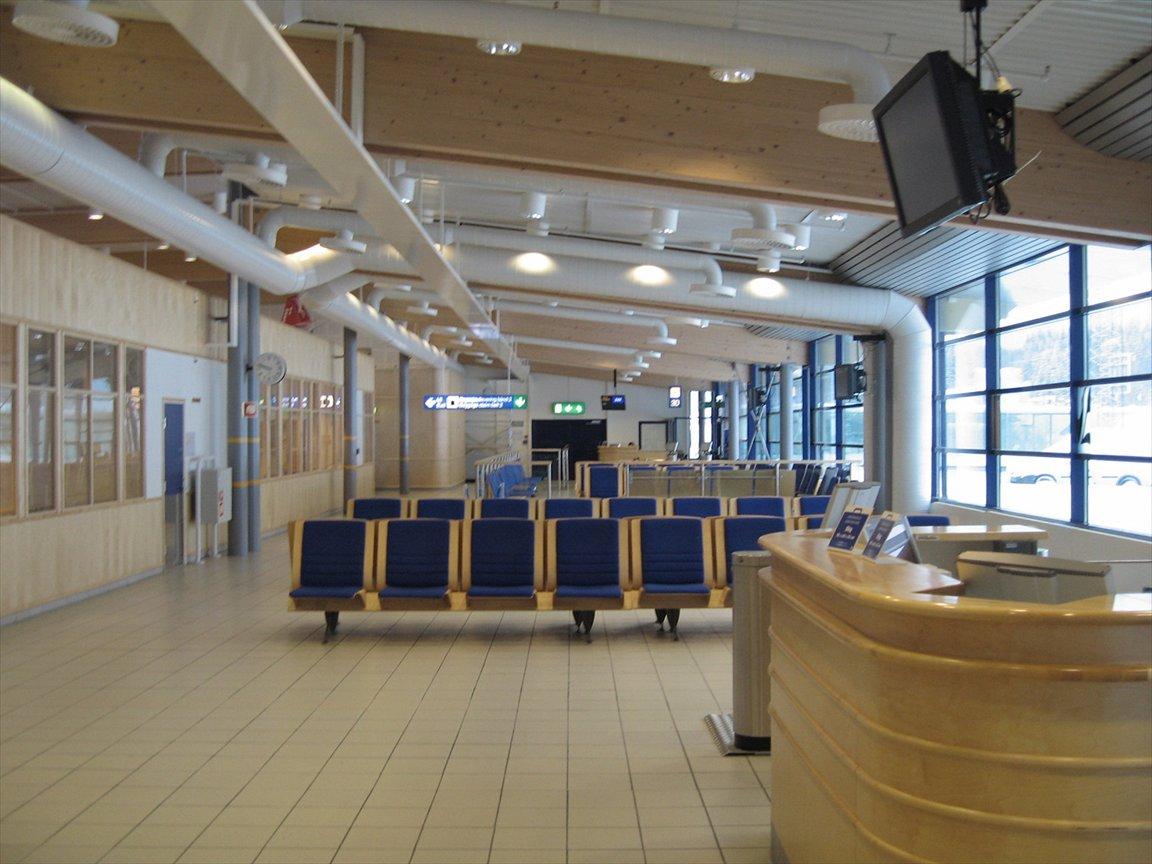
Departure hall of the airport

The airlines Braathens SAFE and Widerøe both launched an alternative proposal whereby the government instead should build a network of short take-off and landing airports. When Håkon Kyllingmark was appointed Minister of Transport and Communications in 1965, he placed the primary airport construction plan on hold and instead focused on construction of regional airports. This caused local interest for airports at Kvæfjordeidet and Vidrek to resume, after initiative from Widerøe. Several commercial interest organizations in Narvik supported an airport at Vidrek, while their Harstad counterparts supported an airport at Evenes. Narvik Municipal Council continued to support Evenes until it was instead proposed as a regional airport. It voted in February 1968 to continue to support Evenes as a primary airport, but also work for a local airport in Narvik.

The Tjelsund Bridge was opened on 22 October 1967. The construction of an airport for Harstad and Narvik was discussed in Parliament in June 1970. First a large majority voted down a proposal to build regional airport for each town, followed by a unanimous decision to build a primary airport at Evenes. Construction started in the fall of 1971 and the airport opened 30 June 1973, with a 1,600-meter (5,200 ft) runway. SAS was granted the right to fly to Oslo, while Braathens SAFE was allowed to fly a route via Kristiansund, Molde and Ålesund to Bergen and Stavanger, as well as to Bodø and Tromsø. Narvik Airport, Framnes opened on 1 October 1975, and Widerøe started operating from Narvik to Evenes. Norving started a route from Harstad/Narvik to Luleå, Sweden and Rovaniemi, Finland, in 1984, using the Dornier 228. This required the establishment of a border control at Evenes, which Norving had to pay for.

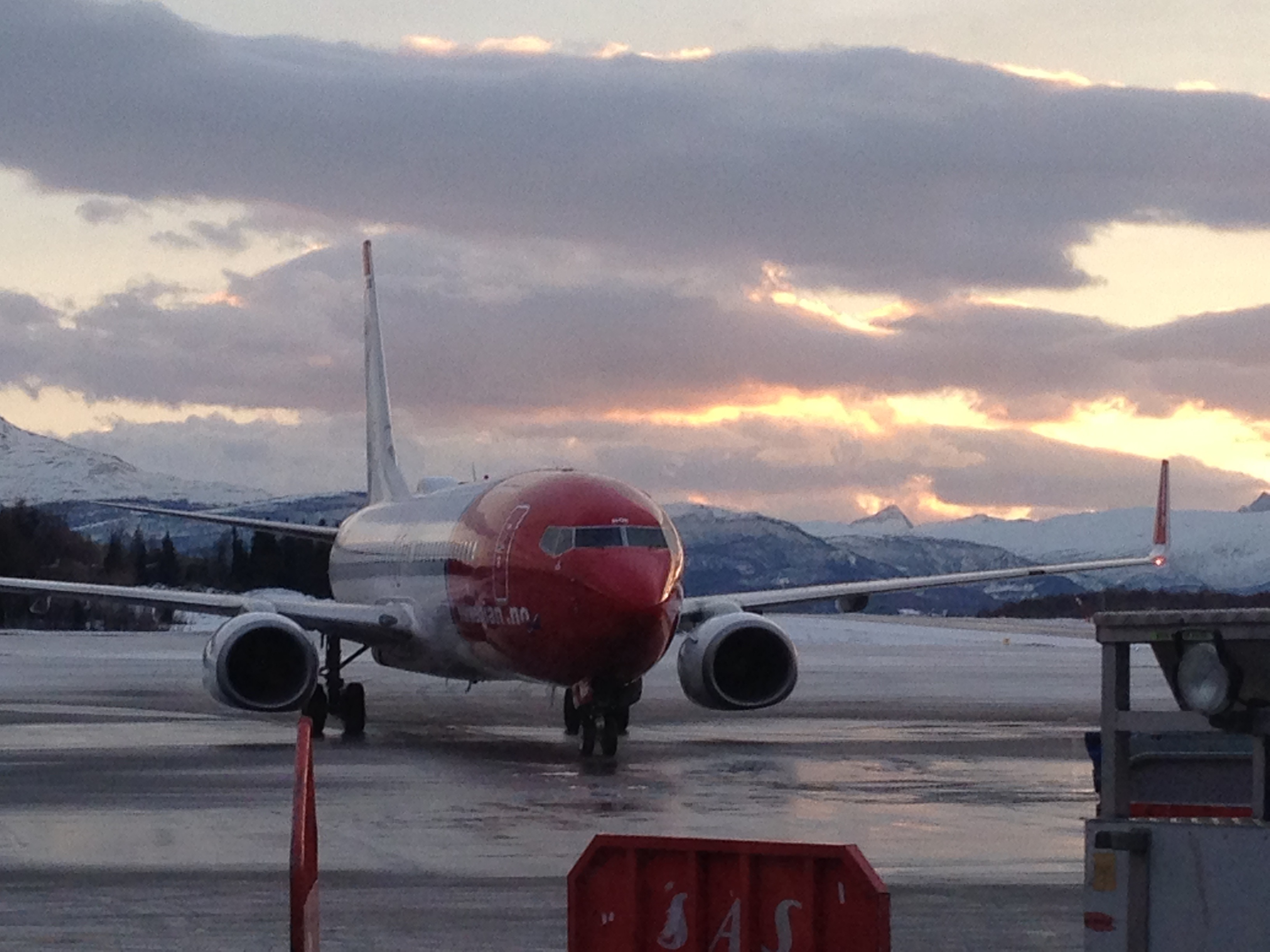
Norwegian Air Shuttle Boeing 737-800 at the airport

The air force started looking at Evenes as a potential air station after the airport opened. Military funding was allocated, allowing the runway to be extended to 2,760 meters (9,060 ft) plus overrun and a taxiway, as well as parking for fighter aircraft, heavy transport aircraft and maintenance facilities. The extended runway was completed in 1977. Construction of the initial auxiliary facilities started in 1978 and was concluded in 1985. Evenes Air Station became operative in January 1986. Construction continued with barracks, which were completed in 1991, aircraft shelters, administrative offices and storage facilities, which were concluded in 1995. No military aircraft have been permanently stationed at Evenes.

=== Operational history ===
Nordtrafikk started an airport coach service from Sortland in 1990. Estimates showed that it captured 4,300 annual passengers which otherwise would have used Stokmarknes Airport, Skagen. SAS reorganized its operations in Northern Norway from 1990 and Harstad/Narvik became one of four airports to receive direct services to Oslo. Previously these sometimes made intermediate stops at Trondheim. Services to Bodø, Tromsø and Trondheim were transferred to the newly established SAS Commuter. The airline market in Norway was deregulated on 1 April 1994. The same day Braathens SAFE started two daily services from Evenes to Oslo. However, the airline terminated its direct service to Bergen, instead making passengers transfer at Trondheim Airport, Værnes. At the same time Widerøe's route Andenes–Harstad/Narvik–Narvik–Bodø terminated its stops at Harstad/Narvik. Kato Air was established in 1995 with Evenes as its base, initially offering general aviation services. Weekly flights with fresh fish to Japan started in the mid-1990s.

Kato Air started flights from Harstad/Narvik to Bodø and Tromsø on 1 January 1999, but the route failed to attract sufficient patronage and was terminated before the end of the year. After the 2001 purchase of Braathens by SAS Group, the latter terminated its flights to Harstad/Narvik from 2 April 2002. Flights to Oslo were taken over by Braathens, while SAS Commuter's flights to Tromsø, Bodø and Trondheim were taken over by Widerøe. Norwegian Air Shuttle started flights to Harstad/Narvik from Oslo on 5 May 2003. SAS and Braathens merged in 2004, creating SAS Braathens. The Lofoten Fixed Link opened on 1 December 2007, abolishing the need for a ferry between the airport and Lofoten. The driving distance to Svolvær—typically regarded as the starting point for the Lofoten archipelago—was reduced to 160 kilometers (99 mi) and two and a half hours. Subsequently, the airport started marketing itself internationally as Lofoten International Airport. The initiative was welcomed by the tourist industry in Lofoten and Vesterålen, as Evenes is the only primary airport serving the area. Local politicians in Lofoten opposed the name, stating that it threatened the regional Leknes Airport and Svolvær Airport, Helle.

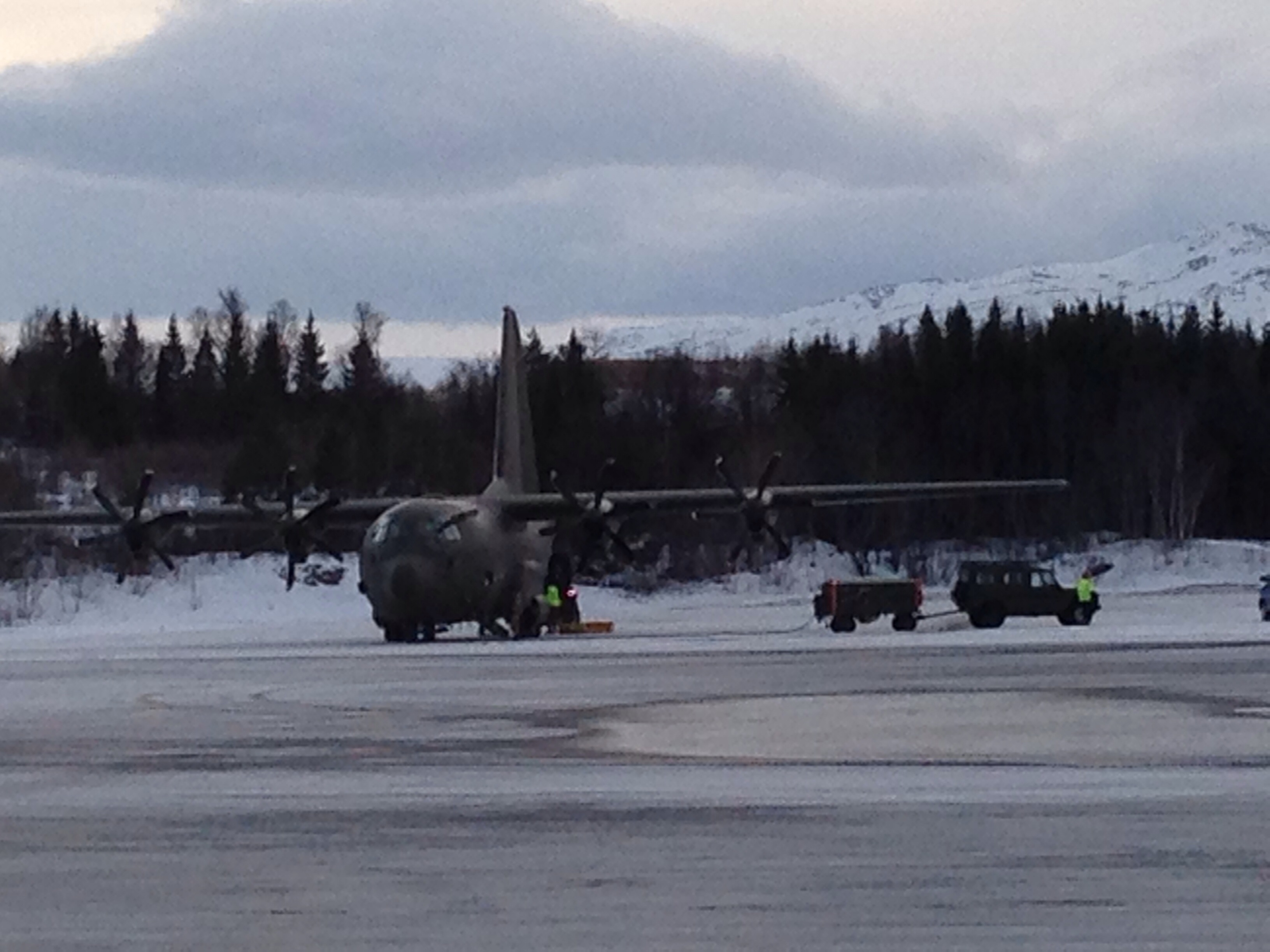
Royal Norwegian Air Force Lockheed C-130 Hercules at Evenes

Kato Air terminated operations in 2008, following the grounding of its aircraft after the Civil Aviation Authority of Norway closed its maintenance division. Parliament decided in June 2012 to order the new Lockheed Martin F-35 Lightning II fighters, with delivery scheduled to start in 2016. The aircraft will be stationed at Ørland Main Air Station with a forward base (QRA) to be established at Evenes Air Station. Widerøe started a service to Tromsø from 1 April 2012, after it was included in the public service obligation system. Evenes saw a large increase of charter services from late 2012, primarily targeted at bringing English and German tourists to Lofoten from London and Munich. Norwegian introduced scheduled services to Gran Canaria and Alicante in Spain from 2013, as well as to Trondheim. Privatefly placed Evenes ninth in a worldwide contest of the most spectacular approach in 2012.

== Facilities ==
The terminal has a capacity for 1,200 passengers per hour and has five gates. Evenes is rated as an airport of entry and some of the gates can be used for international flights. The control tower is located in the former terminal building. There are hangars for smaller airlines. The terminal has a duty-free store and two automated teller machines.

The asphalt runway measures 2,808 by 45 meters (9,213 ft × 148 ft) and is aligned 17–35, roughly north–south. There is a parallel taxiway. Runway 17 has precision approach. Both runways have instrument landing system Category I. The airport is located at an elevation of 26 meters (85 ft) above mean sea level. There are minor operative limitations because of the surrounding terrain. The apron has parking for seven category Boeing 737 and similar sized aircraft, and one larger wide-body aircraft. In addition there is space for general aviation aircraft and helicopters. The airport is certified to handle aircraft up to the size of the Boeing 747 and the C-5 Galaxy. Along with Lakselv Airport, Banak, Evenes is selected by international airlines as an emergency airport for intercontinental flights which pass over Northern Norway. In an emergency the airport is permitted to handle an Airbus A380 and an Antonov An-124 Ruslan.

== Airlines and destinations ==
Regular domestic scheduled services are provided by Norwegian Air Shuttle, Scandinavian Airlines (SAS) and Widerøe. Norwegian and SAS offer five and three daily services using Boeing 737 aircraft to Oslo. Widerøe operates daily services to Bodø, Andenes and Tromsø, the latter a public service obligation contract with the Ministry of Transport and Communications. Norwegian and Condor provide international services to Spain and Germany, while several airlines operate charter services to the Mediterranean.

The airport served 692,532 passengers and 10,636 aircraft movements and handled 1,009 tonnes of cargo in 2014. Evenes is the only primary airport located in Central Hålogaland and the only to offer direct flights to Oslo. There are seven regional airports in the region, but these are mostly limited to other destinations in Northern Norway and require change of aircraft at Bodø Airport to reach Oslo, except from some weekly direct flights to Oslo with Widerøe. There is a significant leakage to Evenes from Lofoten and Vesterålen to Harstad/Narvik for flights to Oslo. These are estimated at forty-five percent for Vesterålen and twenty percent for Lofoten.

=== Passenger ===
Airlines	Destinations
Austrian Airlines	Seasonal: Vienna
Brussels Airlines	Seasonal: Brussels
DAT	Ørland
Discover Airlines	Seasonal: Frankfurt, Munich
easyJet	Seasonal: Amsterdam, Milan–Malpensa
Edelweiss Air	Seasonal: Zürich
Norwegian Air Shuttle	Oslo; Seasonal: Bergamo, Bergen, Palma de Mallorca
Scandinavian Airlines	Oslo; Seasonal: Copenhagen
Widerøe	Andenes, Bodø, Tromsø, Trondheim

=== Cargo ===
Airlines	Destinations
Lufthansa Cargo	Frankfurt
Qatar Airways Cargo	Doha, Liège

== Statistics ==
Annual passenger traffic
Year	Passengers	% Change
2025	922,812	▲9.9%
2024	839,551	▲3.8%
2023	808,655	▲1.8%
2022	794,106	▲50.0%
2021	529,248	▲33.4%
2020	396,716	▼ -48.3%
2019	767,812	▲0.7%
2018	762,747	▲1.0%
2017	755,442	▲5.6%
2016	715,272	▲0.9%
2015	709,239	

== Air force base ==
The Evenes Air Station, situated adjacent to the airport, is a forward air station in Norway operated by the Royal Norwegian Air Force. This air station is the home of the 333 Squadron.

== Ground transport ==
Map showing the airports in the region of Hålogaland of northern Norway. A new primary airport for the Lofoten region is planned outside Hadselsand (orange). This airport would replace the smaller nearby airports of Stokmarknes, Svolvær and Leknes.

Evenes is located 45 kilometers (28 mi) by road (40 minutes) from Harstad, 57 kilometers (35 mi) (50 minutes) from Narvik, 121 kilometers (75 mi) (1:40 hours) from Sortland, 149 kilometers (93 mi) (2:05 hours) from Stokmarknes, 160 kilometers (99 mi) from Svolvær and 230 kilometers (140 mi) to Leknes. There are direct airport coaches to Harstad, Narvik and Sortland; other parts of Vesterålen and Lofoten are served with scheduled buses operated by Boreal Transport. The airport has 1,000 paid parking spaces; car rental and taxis are also available.

== Future ==
The air force has started upgrading Evenes Air Station for the F-35 from 2021. The air station will have a capacity for stationing a QRA of 15 fighter aircraft, as well as handling exercises with allied aircraft. The air station is estimated to produce 1,600 aircraft movements per year once operative.

The government has also proposed that new Maritime Patrol Aircraft shall be co-located with F-35 at Evenes Air Station. Evenes will also be strengthened with the establishment of dedicated base defence units and long-range air defences. Andøya air station that currently serves as base for Norway's Maritime Patrol Aircraft, is slated for closure.

Avinor plans to expand the runway safety area in 2014. Narvik Airport, Framnes closed in 2017, based on the opening of the Hålogaland Bridge. The bridge will reduce the travel distance by road from Narvik to the Evenes by 18 kilometers (11 mi) and 20 minutes.

Avinor is planning to build a new primary airport to serve Lofoten and possibly also Vesterålen. Two locations have been put forward, Gimsøya (68°19′10″N 14°9′30″E) and Hadselsand (68°25′40″N 14°37′30″E). Gimsøy has after a thorough investigation been deemed unsuitable as the site for a new airport due to high wind turbulence. Hadselsand would have direct services to Oslo, resulting in reduction of leakage to Evenes. Independent of the airport plans, a tunnel between Fiskefjorden and Gullesfjorden is under construction which will reduce the road distance from Lofoten to Evenes by 19 kilometers (12 mi) and 31 minutes. A tunnel under Tjeldsundet is also planned which would reduce the road distance by another 18 kilometers (11 mi) and 15 minutes.
