= Kato Airline =

Norwegian airline (1996–2008)

Kato Air
| IATA | ICAO | Call sign |
|---|---|---|
| 6S | KAT | Kato-Air |
- Founded: 16 February 1995
- Ceased operations: 1 September 2008
- Operating bases: Bodø Airport; Harstad/Narvik Airport, Evenes; Trondheim Airport, Værnes
- Fleet size: 4 (2008)
- Destinations: 2 (2008)
- Headquarters: Evenes
- Key people: Karl Johan Karlsen (owner, chair); Torlaug Karlsen (owner, CEO)
- Website: http://www.katoair.no

Kato Airline AS, trading as Kato Air, was an airline which operated in Northern Norway between 1995 and 2008. Although also operating some smaller aircraft, the main portion of the airline's fleet were two Dornier 228. The airline was based at the grounds of Harstad/Narvik Airport, Evenes in Evenes Municipality.

Commercial operations began in 1996. An early contract was to deliver newspapers out of Harstad. During 1999 the airline took delivery of two Dornier 228s and started a scheduled service from Harstad/Narvik to Bodø Airport and Tromsø Airport. The route was not viable and closed later that year. In the process Kato Air took over the fixed-wing operations of Helitrans and set up a base at Trondheim Airport, Værnes. Instead the airline focused on charter to oil companies, particularly flying charters from Trondheim to Brønnøysund.

The airline won the public service obligations from Bodø to Røst Airport and to Narvik Airport, Framnes in 2003. Later the year they also won a major contract with Norway Post. The airline suffered two serious incidents. A Dornier 228 crashed and was written off after a lightning strike on 4 December 2003. A scheduled service was hijacked on 29 September 2004. The Brønnøysund, Framnes and newspaper routes were all lost in 2006, after which the company fell into financial difficulties. The maintenance certificate was withdrawn on 28 August 2008 and the airline ceased operations on 1 September.

== History ==
Kato Air was incorporated on 16 February 1995. However, not until 21 February 1996 did it receive an air operator's certificate for general aviation. In the intermediate period the airline cooperated with another airline. The airline established a base at Harstad/Narvik Airport, Evenes, as the first airline to be based at the airport. The company was founded and owned by Karl Johan Karlsen, acting as chairman, and his wife Torlaug Karlsen, the managing director. "Kato" is derived from the first two letters from their respective first names. The fleet started off with a Piper PA-31 Chieftain and a Cessna 172 in 1995. The following year the airline bought a Maule M-5 and a Cessna 208 was procured in 1997.

By 1997, 15 million kr had been invested in the airline. Its first permanent contract was with Verdens Gang to distribute printed newspaper from the press in Harstad to Bodø and Troms]. Later the arrangement was extended to also include the distribution of Dagbladet. The company had a revenue of 6.3 million Norwegian krone in 1997, making a profit of one million. The company sourced seventy percent of its revenue from the newspaper contracts. The main ad hoc charter contractors were the Norwegian Geological Survey and the Norwegian Directorate for Nature Management. A Piper PA-34 Seneca was added to the fleet in 1998.

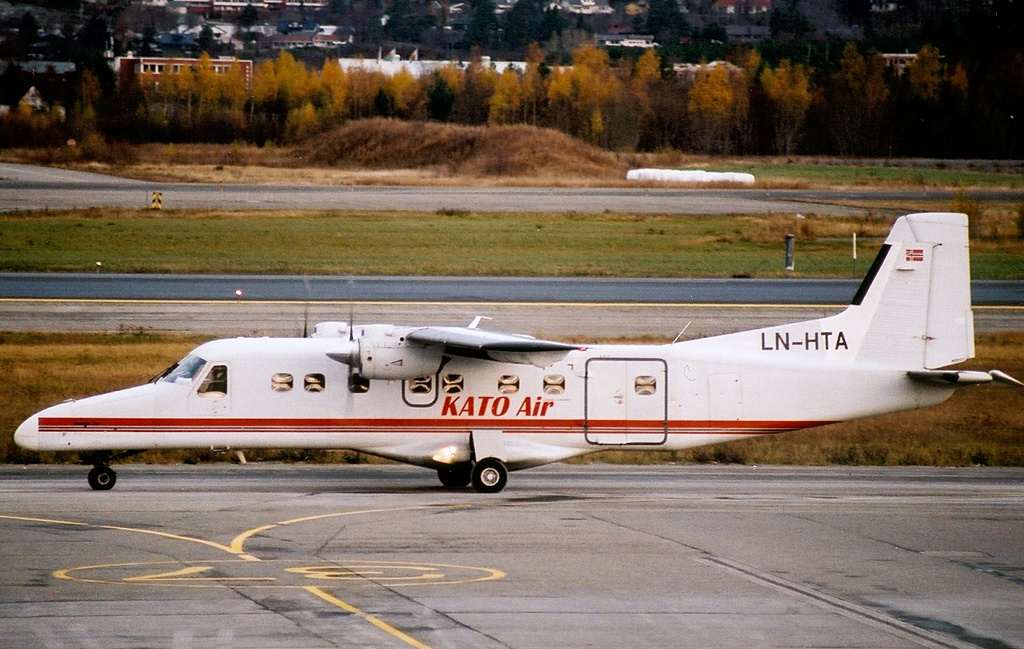
Kato Air Dornier 228 at Trondheim Airport, Værnes in 2002

Kato Air announced plans in October 1998 to establish a scheduled route from Harstad/Narvik to Bodø and Tromsø. The background was that Widerøe was no longer flying this route. Kato Air cooperated with the Stjørdal-based airline Helitrans, who had a surplus of Dornier 228. One of these was taken over by Kato Air, who christened it Bjørnfjell; the other was leased. They had 16 and 19 seats, respectively. The route commenced on 7 December 1998. Each leg had a morning and afternoon round trip on weekdays, as well as an evening flight on Sundays. Kato Air bought ground services from Scandinavian Airlines at Harstad/Narvik and from Widerøe in Bodø and Tromsø. The arrangement ultimately resulted in Kato Air taking over the entire fixed-wing division of Helitrans, who remained with only helicopter operations. Patronage on the route was too low to keep the route running, and it was terminated in November 1999. A contributing factor was an imported fast ferry service to Tromsø.

The Dorniers were subsequently mostly used for charters with oil companies, with Statoil being a dominant customer. Of particular importance was a charter route with the oil company from Trondheim Airport, Værnes to Brønnøysund Airport, Brønnøy. For a period starting in February 2002 the airline also flew a charter route from Trondheim to Kristiansund Airport, Kvernberget.

Starting 1 April 2003 Kato Airline took over two public service obligation routes, which received subsidies from the Ministry of Transport and Communications. Both were out of Bodø, one to Røst Airport and the other to Narvik Airport, Framnes—the downtown airport serving Narvik. The same year the airline won four-year contract with Norway Post to operate postal flights from Trondheim to Bodø, Harstad/Narvik and Tromsø. Kato Airline was allowed to operate the route with a Dornier 228, a significantly smaller aircraft than the incumbent de Havilland Canada Dash 8 used by Widerøe. By December both routes had seen a drastic fall in patronage. Røst Municipal Council came with a statement criticizing the ministry for allowing such aircraft, stating that the lacked among other amenities accessibility, pressure cabin, weather radar, space for hand luggage and that the airline did not operate with discount tickets. The company's revenue peaked at 61 million kroner in 2003.

After failing to make a profit on the Narvik route, Kato Air announced in late 2004 that it would terminate operations on the route from 8 March 2005. No companies bid to fly the route, and so the ministry entered negotiations with Kato Airline to continue operations. This resulted in the fee for the remaining thirteen months increasing from 8 million to 18.2 million kroner. By 2006 the patronage at Narvik Airport, Framnes had halved in the three years the route was operated by Kato Airline.

During late 2005 Kato Air lost three important contracts, both the newspaper flights, the Statoil flights and the Narvik contract. However, they won a new three-year contract to operate the route to Røst, running from 1 April 2006 through 31 March 2009. The loss of business ultimately led to a loss of 10 million kroner in 2007 and put the company under severe financial pressure. This led the company to increase its ad hoc business, which included winning the contract for the organization of the 2007 Dakar Rally. The airline made several bids to win more routes. They applied in 2006 for both PSO contracts in Finnmark, but failed to match the bid from Widerøe.

Following an inspection, the Civil Aviation Authority of Norway withdrew Kato Air Service's aircraft maintenance certificate on 28 August 2008. They citied several severe breaches of regulation and routines. Subsequently, the board decided on 1 September to liquidate the company.

== Destinations ==
The following is a list of scheduled destinations served by Kato Airline.

Kato Airline destinations
| Location | Airport | Start | End | Ref(s) |
|---|---|---|---|---|
| Bodø | Bodø Airport | 1999* | 2008 | |
| Harstad/Narvik | Harstad/Narvik Airport, Evenes | 1999 | 1999 | |
| Narvik | Narvik Airport, Framnes | 2003 | 2008 | |
| Røst | Røst Airport | 2003 | 2008 | |
| Tromsø | Tromsø Airport | 1999 | 1999 | |

== Incidents and accidents ==
- On 4 December 2003, a Dornier 228 operating Flight 603 was struck by lightning, causing a fracture to the control rod that operated the elevator. The aircraft subsequently landed heavily just short of the runway at Bodø Airport. The aircraft, registered as LN-HTA, was written off.
- On 29 September 2004, an asylum seeker entered the cockpit of Dornier 228 LN-BER (flight 605 from Narvik-Framnes to Bodø) and, in a suicide attempt, attacked the pilots with an axe. Thanks to intervention from the other passengers on board (including Odd Eriksen), the crew was able to regain control of the aircraft, saving the airplane. No one was killed but four people were injured by the axe. Security check was not yet implemented at small domestic airports in Norway at the time. The assailant was sentenced to 15 years in prison, and deported after 10 years in prison.

== Bibliography ==
- Hagby, Kay (1998). Fra Nielsen & Winther til Boeing 747 (in Norwegian). Drammen: Hagby. ISBN 8299475201.
