= Bodø Airport =

Airport serving Bodø, Norway

Bodø Airport Bodø lufthavn

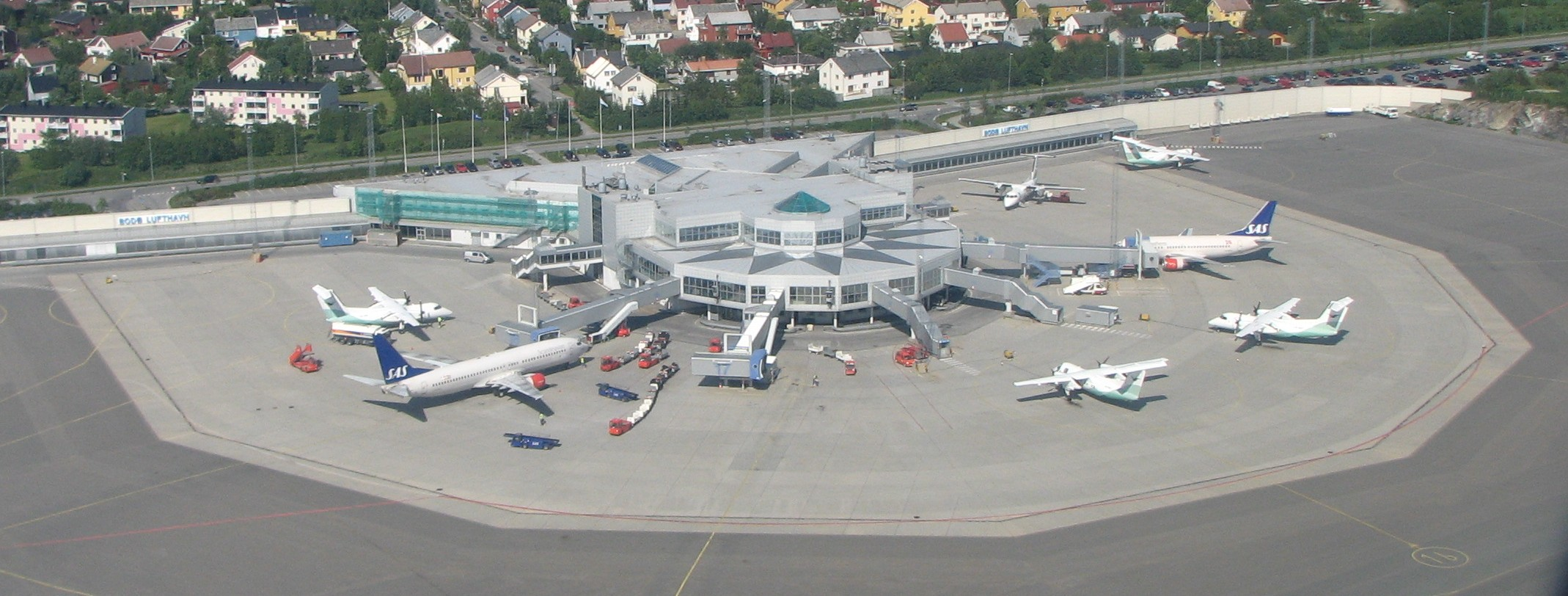
- IATA: BOO; ICAO: ENBO

Summary
- Airport type: Public / Military
- Operator: Avinor
- Serves: Bodø, Norway
- Location: Bodø
- Operating base for: Widerøe
- Elevation AMSL: 13 m (43 ft)
- Coordinates: 67°16′09″N 014°21′55″E
- Website: Official website

Map
- Location within Norway

Runways
Direction	Length		Surface
Direction	m	ft	Surface
07/25	2,794	9,167	Asphalt/concrete

Statistics (2018)
- Passengers: 1,824,601
- Air movements: 41,860
- Source: AIP and statistics from Avinor

Bodø Airport (IATA: BOO, ICAO: ENBO) is a civil airport in the town of Bodø in Bodø Municipality in Nordland county, Norway. Located just south of the city centre, on the westernmost tip of the Bodø peninsula, it shares facilities with the military air force base Bodø Main Air Station. The airport has a single concrete, 2,794 by 45 metres (9,167 by 148 ft) runway which runs in a roughly east–west direction. In addition to jet operations to major domestic destinations, the airport serves as a hub for regional airline flights to Helgeland, Lofoten and Vesterålen.

The airport is the main base and also serving as a main headquarters for the country's largest regional airline Widerøe.

Planning is in progress to build a new airport about one kilometer (0.6 miles) south and build a new smart city district on the site of the current airport. The smart city will be largely focused on transportation and sustainability. The new airport could be ready before 2030, according to media's paraphrasing (in January 2022) of Avinor.

== History ==
Postal flights to Bodø started in 1921, and before 1940 Bodø was served with seaplanes by Widerøe.

The first runway at Bodø Airport was built during World War II by British troops, after Germany had invaded Norway. On 26 May 1940, three Royal Air Force Gloster Gladiators, led by Flight Lieutenant Caesar Hull, landed and made the first airborne defence for the city. The area was swampland, and the first makeshift runway – built in May 1940 by Allied forces during the Norwegian Campaign (8 April–10 June 1940) of World War II – consisted of wooden planks floating on the water. Soon the German Luftwaffe seized control over the airport and held it for the duration of the war, among other things upgrading the runway to concrete.

Not much was done with the airport until after the Korean War started in 1950. The West were afraid of a Soviet attack on Western Europe, so a new military base was constructed at a new location south-west of the old one. Originally planned to be finished in 1951, the new airport did not become fully operational until 1956, though the civilian terminal opened in 1952. From then on, fighter jets have been stationed at Bodø. In 1988, NATO injected vast amounts of money to enable the airfield to handle large air forces in the event of an emergency.

The airport was used during the testing of the supersonic Concorde in June 1975.

In the early 1980s, the current civilian terminal was discussed and planned. The Norwegian Ministry of Finance approved the project early in 1988. The construction started a few weeks after its approval and was completed in spring 1990. The terminal has 11 gates, three with jetways. Since its opening in 1990, the number of passengers increased from 820,000 to 1,700,000 in 2013.

== Air force base ==
The Bodø Main Air Station, situated adjacent to the airport, is the largest air station in Norway operated by the Royal Norwegian Air Force. This air station is the home of the 331st and the 332nd Squadrons equipped with General Dynamics F-16 Fighting Falcons in addition to a detachment from the 330th Squadron of Westland Sea King helicopters.

== Airlines and destinations ==
The airport is a hub for regional flights between Trondheim and Tromsø, in addition to being served by more than ten daily return flights to Oslo. Several international seasonal routes are also served.

Airlines	Destinations
Discover Airlines	Seasonal: Munich
Finnair	Seasonal: Helsinki
Lufttransport	Værøy
Norwegian Air Shuttle	Oslo; Seasonal charter: Gran Canaria
Scandinavian Airlines	Oslo, Tromsø, Trondheim; Seasonal: Copenhagen, Stockholm–Arlanda; Seasonal charter: Chania, Palma de Mallorca
Sunclass Airlines	Seasonal charter: Gran Canaria
Widerøe	Andenes, Bergen, Brønnøysund, Harstad/Narvik, Kristiansand, Leknes, Mo i Rana, Mosjøen, Namsos, Oslo, Rørvik, Røst, Sandefjord, Sandnessjøen, Stavanger, Stokmarknes, Svolvær, Tromsø, Trondheim

== Statistics ==
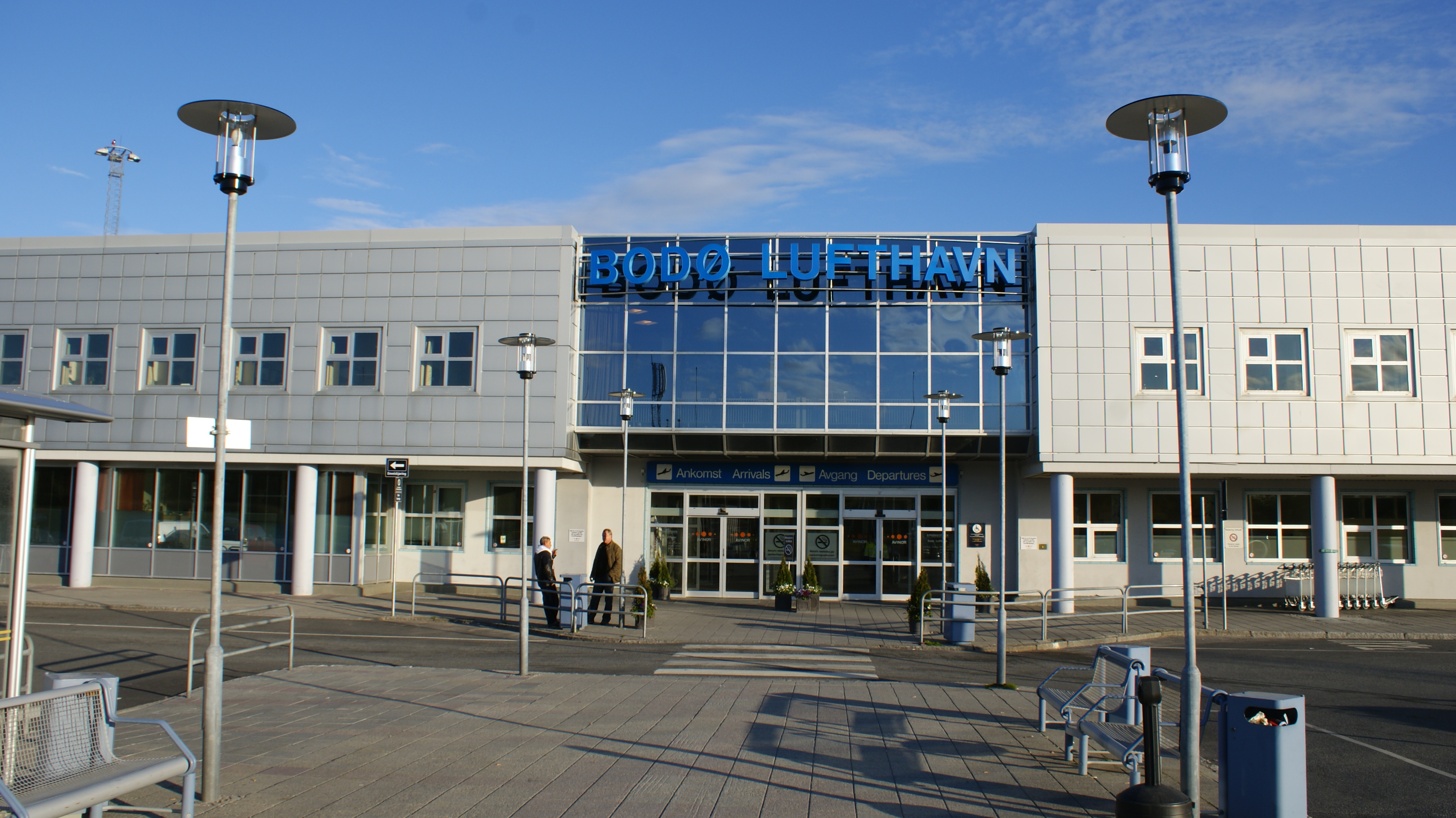
Bodø Airport main terminal

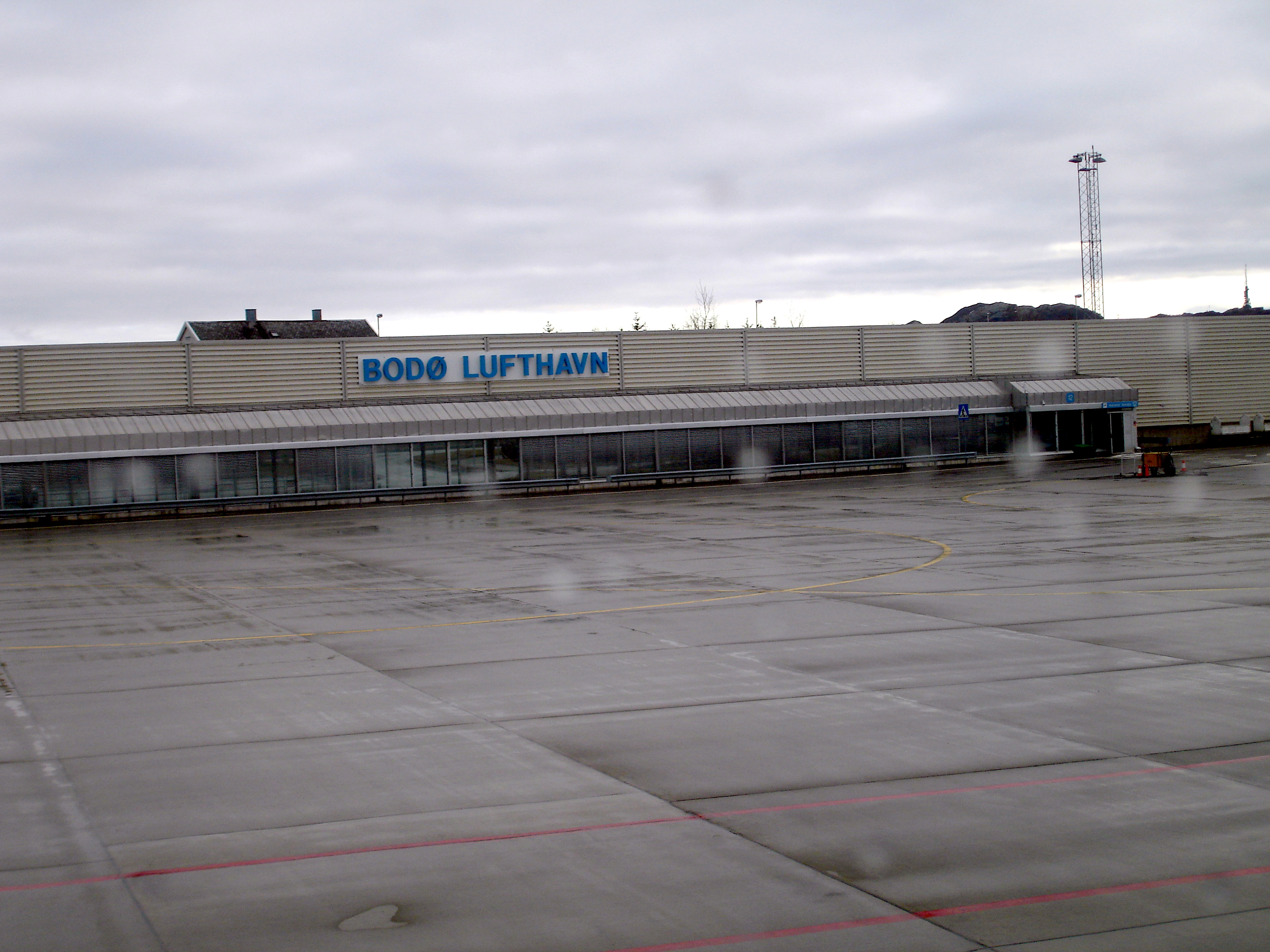
The smaller General Aviation terminal at Bodø

Annual passenger traffic
Year	Passengers	% Change
2025	2,006,386	▲7.6%
2024	1,865,111	▲7.7%
2023	1,731,589	▲5.6%
2022	1,639,469	▲42.4%
2021	1,151,135	▲16.9%
2020	985,014	▼ -47.4%
2019	1,872,649	▲2.6%
2018	1,824,601	▼ -0.4%
2017	1,831,407	▲1.7%
2016	1,801,249	▲3.9%
2015	1,733,330	

== Ground transport ==
The airport is very close to the city centre, about 1.5 km away, and 2.0 km from the railway station. Travel to the airport can be done by local bus, by taxi, or by foot. There are also regional buses from the airport.

== Norwegian Aviation Museum ==
The Norwegian Aviation Museum is located next to the airport in a propeller-shaped building. An aviation centre at the airport was approved by parliament on 31 March 1992, and opened on 15 May 1994. The military part – Luftfartsmuseet (the Aviation Museum) was opened in May 1995. The Norwegian Aviation Museum was formed on 1 January 1998, founded by the government, the local city council of Bodø and the county council of Nordland. The museum is a "national museum" and funded through the national budget.

The museum exhibits several military aircraft including a Lockheed U-2, a Gloster Gladiator and a Supermarine Spitfire. There are also some civilian aircraft on display such as the de Havilland Canada DHC-3 Otter, a Junkers Ju 52/3m on floats, and a Fokker F.28-1000 Fellowship.

== Accidents and incidents ==
- Finnish Beechcraft V35B Bonanza, OH-BBD, disappeared 24 June 1974 in foul weather on its approach to Bodø ENBO. It carried a five-member Saami council and the pilot.
- On 4 December 2003, a Dornier 228 of Kato Airline operating as Flight 603 was struck by lightning, causing a fracture to the control rod that operated the elevator. The aircraft subsequently landed heavily just short of the runway at Bodø and was written off. Both crew members were seriously injured while both passengers sustained slight injuries.
- On 29 September 2004, an asylum-seeker armed with an axe attacked the pilot of Kato Airline flight 605 from Narvik-Framnes, causing the aircraft, a Dornier 228, to go into a dive. The assailant was overpowered by passengers, including Odd Eriksen, later a member of the government (Minister of Commerce), and the aircraft made a safe landing at Bodø.
