= Norwegian Civil Aircraft Register =

Register for Norwegian Civil Aircraft

The Norwegian Civil Aircraft Register (Norwegian: Norges luftfartøyregister) is a judicial register for civil aircraft of Norwegian nationality. The registry is maintained by the Civil Aviation Authority of Norway. They have allowed the Norwegian Air Sport Association to manage ultralight aircraft registrations. All aircraft in the register are issued a five-letter marking, with a LN- prefix, e.g. LN-FOO.

== History ==
The first aircraft registration system in Norway was introduced in 1919. Aircraft were issued a sequential registration number. The aircraft were required to be painted with markings consisting of N, hyphen and the registration number, e.g. N-14. From 1925 this numbering scheme continued, although the certificate of airworthiness were also numbered, using a different numbering scheme.

Norway was allocated the international LN prefix and introduced registration with these in 1931. Aircraft were to use LN followed by a hyphen and three letters. The first aircraft such registered was LGF V-13 Strehla, LN-ABE, on 4 July 1931. Again there arose a small discrepancy in the numbering of the aircraft registration number and the certificate of airworthiness numbers. Some registration numbers were skipped, others used multiple times. The numbering discrepancy was not synchronized until 1966, with number 792.

A special case arose with Scandinavian Airlines System (SAS), which was created as a trilateral flag carrier. Ownership followed the "principle of sevenths", in which Norwegian Air Lines and Danish Air Lines each owned two sevenths and Sweden's Aerotransport owned three sevenths. The same ratio was followed in the registration of aircraft; thus two sevenths of SAS' fleet received Norwegian registrations.

The registration and airworthiness numbers were discontinued after 31 December 1995. Afterwards only letter markings have been issued. The responsibility for maintaining the register was taken over by the Civil Aviation Authority from 1 January 2000, when the agency was created and demerged from the Norwegian Air Traffic and Airport Management.

== Judicial aspects ==
The judicial framework for the register is established through the Act no. 0101 of 11 June 1993 relating to Aviation (Aviation Act), which governs the most central parts of the register. The remaining aspects are regulated through the government direction Forskrift om registrering av luftfartøy m.m.

The Norwegian Civil Aircraft Register is one of nine governmental judicial registers in Norway. The register manages several roles. Firstly, it ascertains the owner of an aircraft, and if different from the owner, the operator. The register can also be used to register any encumbrances on the aircraft. This has an international application, through Norway's ratification of the Cape Town Treaty. In addition, they register issues aircraft markings.

Registration is maintained by the Civil Aviation Administration in Bodø. However, management of ultralight aircraft is maintained by the Norwegian Air Sports Association. The register is digital. Fees apply to registration of aircraft, but not to deletion of entries.

== Markings ==
Aircraft registration markings have five letters. Norwegian aircraft are given the LN- prefix, followed by a three-letter code. Only the letters A through Z are available; the Norwegian letters Æ, Ø and Å cannot be registered. The general principle is that aircraft owners may select any available registration code. Airlines may also reserve series of codes to allow for a consistent marking scheme. Aircraft retain their markings if they change owners or operators within Norway.

Some series are reserved for special classifications of aircraft.

Special series
Markings	Types
LN-C**	Balloons
LN-G**	Sailplanes
LN-O**	Helicopters
LN-Y**	Ultralight aircraft

Due to similarities with emergency callsigns mayday and pan-pan, three markings are not available – LN-PAN, LN-SOS and LN-XXX.

== Bibliography ==
- Hagby, Kay (1998). Fra Nielsen & Winther til Boeing 747 (in Norwegian). Drammen: Hagby. ISBN 8299475201.
- Hall, Åke (2002). Luftens Vikingar – en bok om SAS alla flygplan (in Swedish). Nässjö: Air Historic Research. ISBN 91-973892-3-4.
