= Røst Airport =

Airport in Røst, Norway

Røst Airport Røst lufthavn

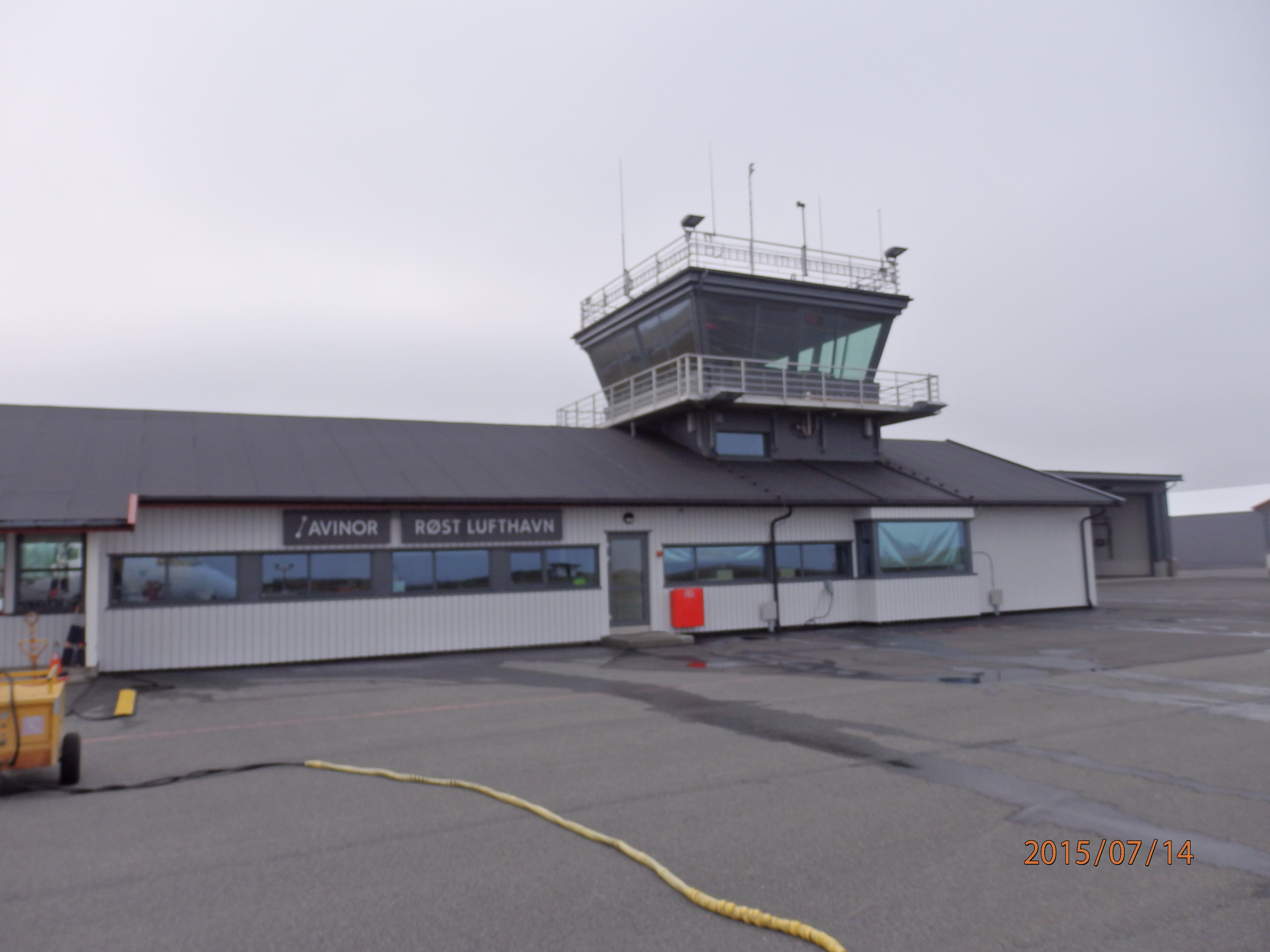
- IATA: RET; ICAO: ENRS

Summary
- Airport type: Public
- Owner/Operator: Avinor
- Serves: Røst, Norway
- Location: Røstlandet, Røst
- Elevation AMSL: 3 m / 10 ft
- Coordinates: 67°31′40″N 12°06′12″E
- Website: avinor.no

Map

Runways
Direction	Length		Surface
Direction	m	ft	Surface
03/21	880	2,887	Asphalt

Statistics (2014)
- Passengers: 9,889
- Aircraft movements: 1,343
- Cargo (tonnes): 2

Røst Airport (Norwegian: Røst lufthavn; IATA: RET, ICAO: ENRS) is a regional airport serving Røst Municipality in Nordland county, Norway. The airport is located on the northern edge of the main island of Røstlandet, just north of the main village of Røstlandet. It is owned and operated by the state-owned Avinor, and the tower is remotely controlled from Bodø.

The airport handled 9,889 passengers in 2014. Services are provided by Widerøe, operating Dash 8-100 aircraft on contract with the Ministry of Transport and Communications to Bodø Airport and Leknes Airport.

Røst was first served using seaplanes from the 1960s, and then by helicopters from 1970. Røst Airport opened on 1 June 1986, initially with Widerøe operating de Havilland Canada Twin Otters. From 2000 to 2001 the service was operated by Guard Air, and from 2003 to 2008 by Kato Air; otherwise Widerøe has flown the route.

== History ==
Services to Røst started in 1965, when Widerøe commenced seaplane services to the island using de Havilland Canada Otters and Noorduyn Norseman aircraft. The routes were operated two to three times per week as a charter service, with subsidies from the municipalities of Værøy and Røst. Helikopter Service flew between Bodø Airport to Røst Municipality and Værøy Municipality (an island community further inland from Røst) with three weekly services from 1973. The helicopters doubled as serving for search and rescue duty; in case they were needed for the latter flights to Værøy and Røst were cancelled. The regional airports in Lofoten and Vesterålen opened in 1972, with the Værøy and Røst service being taken over by Widerøe on 1 September 1973. As they did not want to operate helicopters, they subcontracted the operations to Helilift. The service operated twice per day on weekdays and once per day in the weekends, using two sixteen-seat Sikorsky S-58Ts. Subsidies of 1.9 million Norwegian krone (NOK) was granted for the route in 1973, and the service transported 5,359 passengers (from both Røst and Værøy).

One of the helicopters was bought by Widerøe in December 1976 and the operations were subcontracted to Offshore Helicopters. The second Sikorsky was bought from Helilift in March 1978 and also operated by Offshore Helicopters. Helikopter Service merged with Offshore Helicopters in 1980, and the new Helikopter Service took over the route. They introduced an eleven-seat Bell 212 helicopters from 1 January 1982 because of the high maintenance costs of the S-58Ts. In 1982 the service to both islands handled 7,145 passengers and three tonnes of post and cargo, and made 744 landings. It received subsidies for NOK 4 million.

Plans for an airport with short take-off and landing flights was launched by the government in December 1983. The airport was proposed along with five other regional airport: Fagernes Airport, Leirin; Førde Airport, Bringeland; Mosjøen Airport, Kjærstad; Rørvik Airport, Ryum and Værøy Airport. The plans were passed by Parliament on 10 April 1984 and construction started in 1985. On 22 August 1985 the municipality was granted concession to operate the airport. Værøy and Røst Airports were opened on 1 June 1986, with Røst Airport having cost about NOK 15 million to build.

The Civil Aviation Administration proposed in 1994 closing the airport along with eight other regional airports, because they had high subsidy levels. Røst Airport was nationalized on 1 January 1997, along with 25 other regional airports, and placed under the control of the Norwegian Civil Airport Administration (now Avinor).

=== Service ===
After the airport opened, services started with Widerøe-operated twenty-seat de Havilland Canada DHC-6 Twin Otters. The airline operated two trips Bodø–Røst–Værøy–Bodø on weekdays and one round trip during the weekend. In addition, there were two weekly trips that connected Værøy to Leknes Airport before returning to Bodø. The service was subsidized by the Ministry of Transport and Communications. Widerøe replaced the Twin Otters with 37-seat de Havilland Canada DHC-8-100 Dash 8s in 1995. The route from Bodø to Røst was made subject to public service obligation from 1 April 1997, which was won by the incumbent, after beating Valdresfly and Helikopter Service in the auction. The following contract, valid from 1 April 2000, was awarded to Guard Air, but this company folded in 2001. Helikopter Service operated the route temporarily until Widerøe took it over again the same year.

On 1 April 2003, Kato Air took over the Bodø–Røst route, using Dornier 228 aircraft. The new airline had a troubled start with the passenger numbers dropping by 27 percent. On 4 December, a flight from Røst to Bodø was hit by lightning, and received severe damage during the landing at Bodø. The choice of the operator was criticized by the Røst Municipal Council following the incident, stated that the ministry had prioritized price over safety. The council stated that they did not feel that Kato Air provided the same service as Widerøe and that the aircraft were a safety hazard. Among the complaints were lack of accessibility for disabled people, no cabin pressurization, no weather radar, more expensive tickets, no discounted tickets and no possibility for carry-on baggage. In February 2006, there was a wave of cancellations by Kato Air, due to technical problems with both the airline's aircraft. In June, the airline's pilots started selling tickets themselves at the airport. The company stated that this was because they had declined Widerøe to do this because of higher costs. The Civil Aviation Authority of Norway withdrew Kato Air's concession in 2008 due to lack on maintenance. On an interim basis, the helicopter airline Lufttransport, that operated the route to the nearby island of Værøy, took over the route from 5 September to 29 October, when Widerøe started flying again.

== Facilities ==
Røst Airport is a regional airport owned and operated by Avinor. It serves the island of Røstlandet, the most remote island in the Lofoten archipelago. It has a terminal building with a capacity for 40 passengers per hour. The largest aircraft that can operate at the airport are the Dash 8-100. There is free parking at the airport for 20 vehicles. Taxis can be prebooked. The airport resides at an elevation of 3 meters (9.8 feet) above mean sea level. It has one runway designated 03–21 with an asphalt surface measuring 880 by 30 meters (2,887 ft × 98 ft).

== Airlines and destinations ==
The airport is served twice daily with a de Havilland Canada DHC-8-100 Dash 8 by Widerøe. Flight operate from Bodø Airport via Røst to Svolvær Helle before returning to Bodø. The routes are operated as a public service obligation on contract with the Ministry of Transport and Communications.

Airlines	Destinations
Widerøe	Bodø, Svolvær

== Statistics ==
Annual passenger traffic
Year	Passengers	% Change
2025	11,441	▼ -11.7%
2024	12,954	▲21.3%
2023	10,680	▼ -11.6%
2022	12,087	▲21.9%
2021	9,912	▲2.8%
2020	9,645	▼ -33.9%
2019	14,598	▼ -4.3%
2018	15,260	▼ -2.4%
2017	15,631	▼ -2.5%
2016	16,028	▲8.3%
2015	14,806	
