= Svolvær Airport =

Svolvær Airport, Helle Svolvær lufthavn

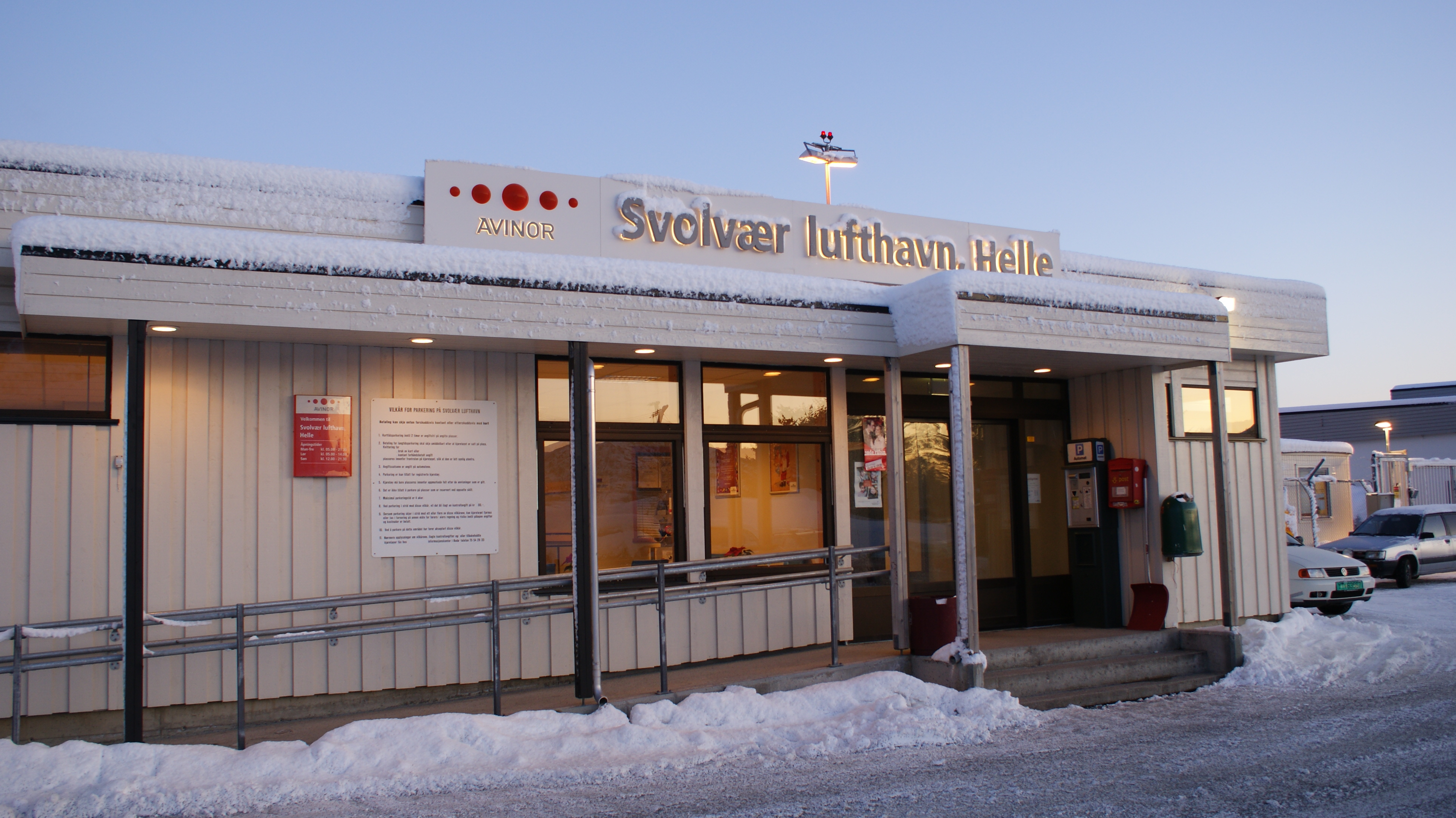
- Svolvær Airport terminal building.
- IATA: SVJ; ICAO: ENSH

Summary
- Airport type: Public
- Operator: Avinor
- Serves: Svolvær
- Location: Helle
- Elevation AMSL: 29 ft (8.8 m)
- Coordinates: 68°14′35.88″N 14°40′09.12″E
- Website: avinor.no

Map
- Location within Norway

Runways
Direction	Length		Surface
Direction	ft	m	Surface
01/19	3,104	946	Asphalt

Statistics (2014)
- Passengers: 74,496
- Aircraft movements: 4,308
- Cargo (tonnes): 13

Svolvær Airport (Norwegian: Svolvær lufthavn; IATA: SVJ, ICAO: ENSH) is a regional airport serving the town of Svolvær in Vågan Municipality (and the Lofoten region surrounding Svolvær) in Nordland county, Norway.

== Service ==
The airport is operated by Avinor. It is served by Widerøe with Dash 8 aircraft connecting the community to Bodø and other communities in Nordland. The services are all on subsidized public service obligation routes administered by the Norwegian Ministry of Transportation and Communication. The airport also has direct flights to Oslo.

In 2014, Svolvær Airport had 74,496 passengers. In 2007, a new road (Lofoten Mainland Connection) opened which allows driving to the Harstad/Narvik Airport, but Svolvær Airport has kept its passenger figures.

== Airlines and destinations ==
Airlines	Destinations
Widerøe	Bodø, Røst, Tromsø; Seasonal: Oslo

== Ground transportation ==
There is no bus service to the airport, but taxis are available. The airport is located at Helle, about 6 kilometres (3.7 mi) east of the town.

== Statistics ==
Annual passenger traffic
Year	Passengers	% Change
2025	118,993	▲14.6%
2024	103,819	▲9.8%
2023	94,543	▲5.1%
2022	89,927	▲35.3%
2021	66,474	▲31.1%
2020	50,721	▼ -46.3%
2019	94,498	▼ -8.7%
2018	103,530	▼ -3.4%
2017	107,144	▲26.9%
2016	84,448	▲3.1%
2015	81,878	

== Future ==
Present airports in black, suggested in blue

Avinor is planning building a new primary airport to serve Lofoten and possibly also Vesterålen. The region wants to be more attractive on the conference market which would create more job opportunities outside the tourist season, and there is a need to adopt airports to modern aircraft types.

Two locations have been put forward, Gimsøya (68°19′10″N 14°9′30″E) and Hadselsanden (68°25′40″N 14°37′30″E). The former could replace Leknes Airport and Svolvær Airport, Helle, the latter could also replace Stokmarknes Airport. As both alternatives imply direct services to Oslo, the leakage to Evenes Airport would be reduced. Gimsøy was the most favoured alternative since Stokmarknes needs ferry access if its airport is replaced, or a future tunnel which seems to expensive, and because Hadselsanden is fairly distant from Leknes (113 kilometers (70 mi)). However weather recordings has shown that Gimsøy, located at the big ocean, is too windy and foggy for an airport. Therefore, the main option now is to extend Leknes, considering that Svolvær airport has no room for extension.

There are plans to build a tunnel along the road E10 which would reduce the road distance from Svolvær to Gimsøy and Leknes by 7 kilometers (4.3 mi) and 6 minutes, probably built after 2030. There has been since 2023 an ongoing project to reduce the road travel time to Evenes by 30 minutes to well below 2 hours, finished 2028.
