= Lofoten Mainland Connection =

Road in Norway

Lofoten Mainland Connection (Norwegian: Lofotens fastlandsforbindelse) or Lofast is a part of European route E10 that connects the Norwegian archipelago of Lofoten to the mainland, giving direct access to Lofoten from the surrounding municipalities.

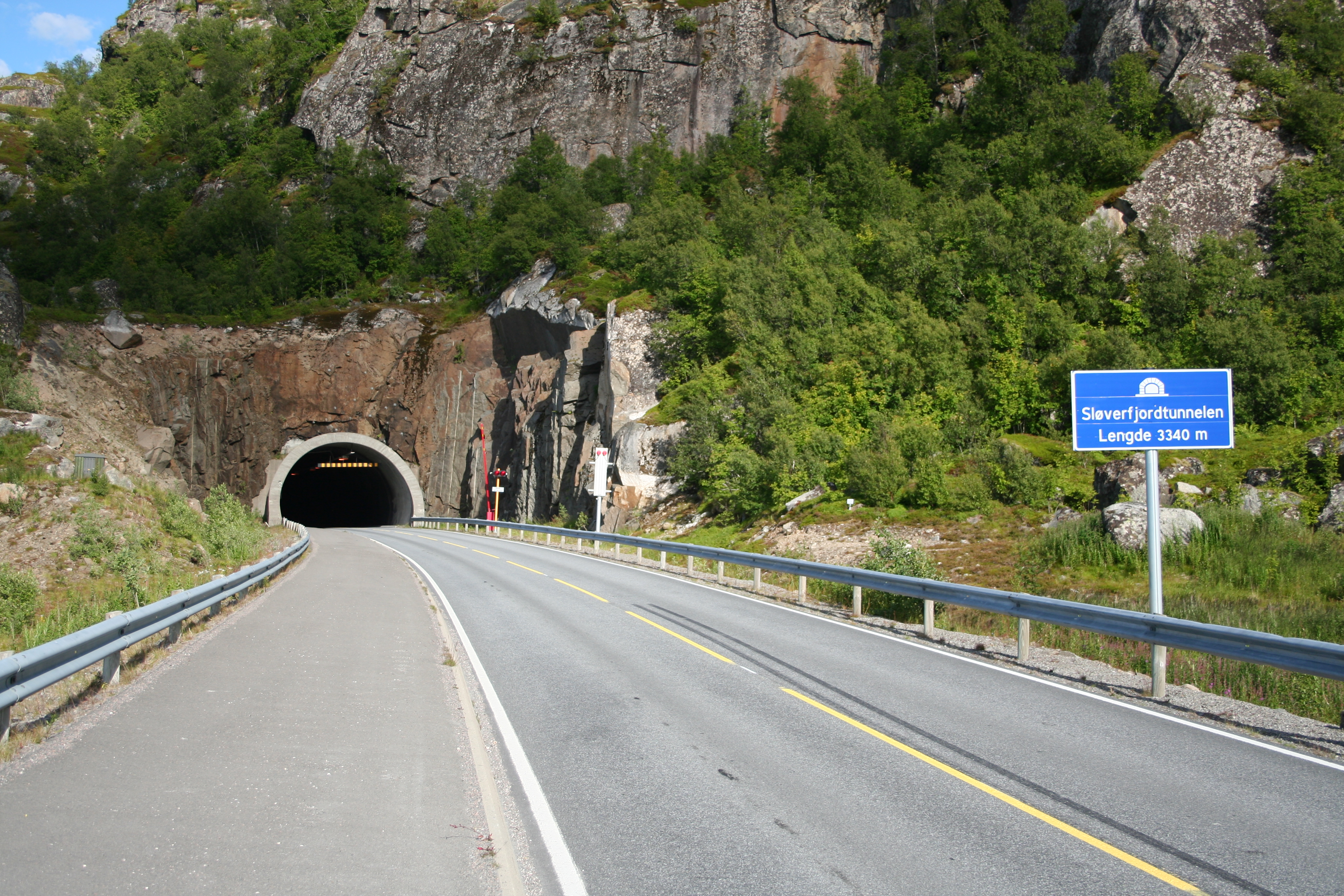
The Sløverfjord subsea tunnel is 3.3 km long.

The construction of this road was started autumn 1993, and temporarily shut down in 1998, when the first part was finished. It started up again in 2003, and Lofast was officially opened December 1, 2007. Actually Lofast connects Lofoten with the older road network on Hinnøya which was already connected to the mainland.

E10 from Lofoten to the mainland formerly went through the Vesterålen archipelago, with the Melbu–Fiskebøl Ferry. This road went through several towns with uneven speed limits. Lofast is a significantly shorter road connection across Hinnøya to the mainland that requires no ferry crossings and allows driving at relatively high speeds. For instance, the bus ride from Harstad/Narvik Airport, Evenes to Svolvær in Lofoten, which used to take 4 hours 15 minutes including a ferry trip (210 km), now takes only 3 hours incl. stops (170 km). This trip can even be as short as just over 2 hours if driven with a car without stops.

All the larger islands in Lofoten are already connected by bridges or undersea tunnels. This means that after the construction of Lofast most of Lofoten is now connected to the mainland of Norway. The Lofast uses several tunnels, the largest is Sørdal Tunnel (6.3 km) and there is also Sløverfjord Tunnel (3.3 km) and five more tunnels and a 700 m long Raftsund Bridge. The final bridge crossing from Hinnøya over to the mainland is with the previously existing Tjeldsund Bridge.

Later has planning started about improving the road from Lofast eastern end at Gullesfjordbotn to near the Harstad/Narvik Airport. This will include multiple mountain tunnels and an undersea tunnel under the Tjeldsundet strait, and shorten the distance by 35 km and the drive time by 30 minutes. This is expected to be finished by 2030.
