= Leknes Airport =

Airport in Vestvågøy, Norway

Leknes Airport Leknes lufthavn

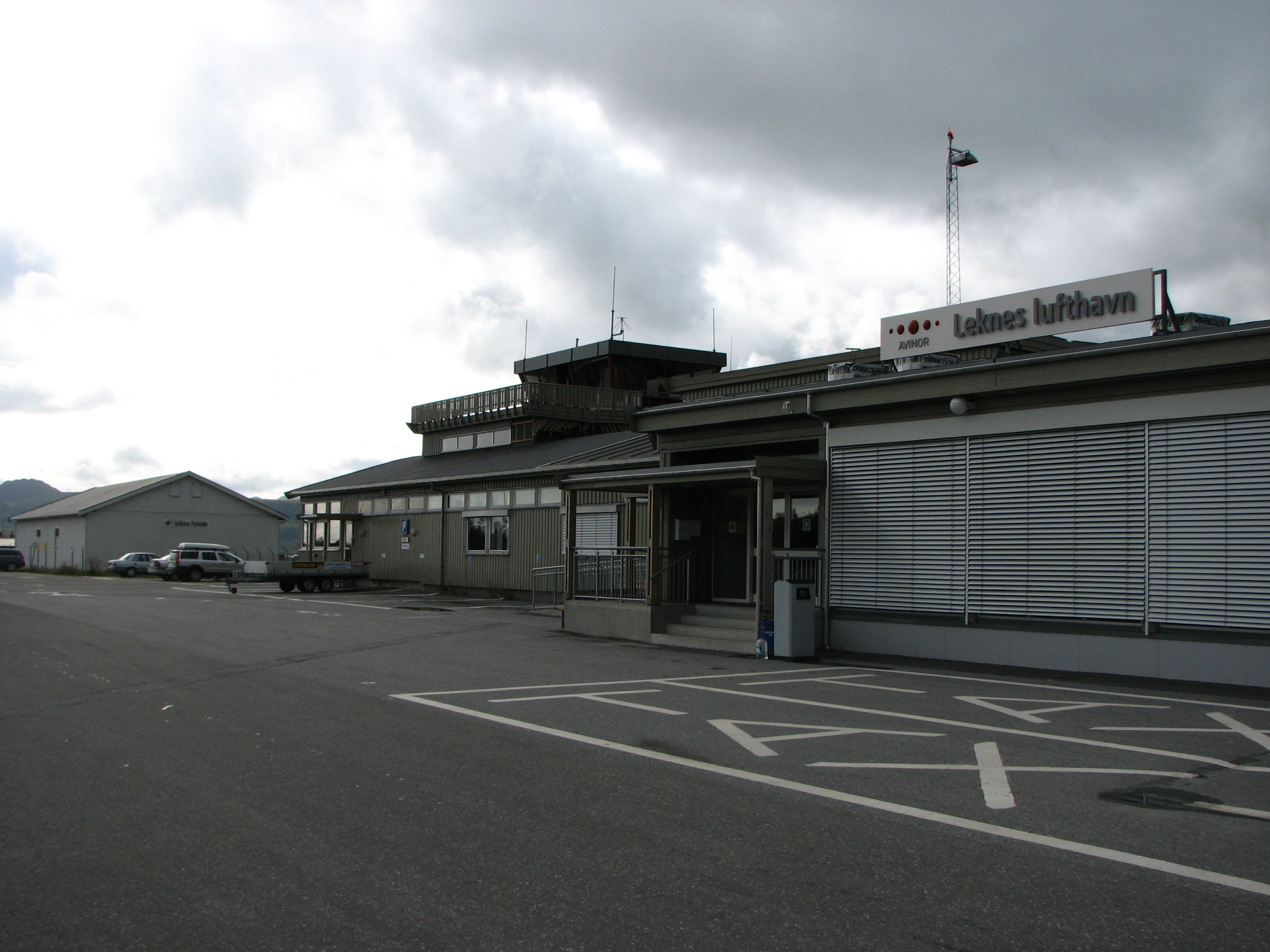
- IATA: LKN; ICAO: ENLK

Summary
- Airport type: Public
- Operator: Avinor
- Location: Leknes
- Elevation AMSL: 24 m / 80 ft
- Coordinates: 68°09′09″N 13°36′34″E
- Website: avinor.no

Map

Runways
Direction	Length		Surface
Direction	m	ft	Surface
02/20	1,071	3,514	Asphalt

Statistics (2014)
- Passengers: 101,757
- Aircraft movements: 5,839
- Cargo (tonnes): 12

Leknes Airport (Norwegian: Leknes lufthavn; IATA: LKN, ICAO: ENLK) is a regional airport serving the town of Leknes and the surrounding areas in the Lofoten archipelago in Nordland county, Norway. The airport is located just outside Leknes in Vestvågøy Municipality. The European route E10 highway passes along the east side of the airport. In 2014, Leknes Airport had 101,757 passengers. It is operated by Avinor.

== Service ==
The airport is served by Widerøe with Dash 8 aircraft connecting the community to Bodø and other communities in Nordland. The routes are operated on public service obligation with the Norwegian Ministry of Transportation and Communication. Flights to Oslo via Bodø take about 3 hours with connecting routes Widerøe/Scandinavian Airlines.

== Airlines and destinations ==
Airlines	Destinations
Widerøe	Bodø, Oslo, Røst, Stokmarknes, Svolvær, Tromsø

== Statistics ==
Annual passenger traffic
Year	Passengers	% Change
2025	164,150	▲22.5%
2024	133,992	▲18.7%
2023	112,837	▲7.6%
2022	104,890	▲27.1%
2021	82,495	▼ -4.1%
2020	86,038	▼ -34.4%
2019	131,105	▼ -2.0%
2018	133,846	▼ -2.1%
2017	136,746	▲20.4%
2016	113,595	▲7.7%
2015	105,470	

== Ground transportation ==
The airport is located approximately 1 kilometre (0.62 mi) from the town center. There are no buses, but taxis are available.

== Future ==
Avinor is planning building a new primary airport to serve Lofoten and possibly also Vesterålen. The region wants to be more attractive on the conference market which would create more job opportunities outside the tourist season, and there is a need to adapt airports to modern aircraft types.

Two locations have been put forward, Gimsøya (68°19′10″N 14°9′30″E) and Hadselsanden (68°25′40″N 14°37′30″E). The former could replace Leknes Airport and Svolvær Airport, the latter could also replace Stokmarknes Airport. As both alternatives imply direct services to Oslo, the leakage to Evenes would be reduced. However weather recordings has shown that Gimsøy, located at the big ocean, is too windy and foggy for an airport.

Therefore, the main option now is to extend the runway and terminal of Leknes airport, considering that Svolvær airport has no room for runway extension. No such project is part of the Norwegian National Transport Plan for 2022–2033.

A large road project, which will reduce the drive time between Svolvær and Evenes by 35 minutes to below two hours, will be built 2023–2028. This might make Harstad-Evenes Airport more attractive than Leknes for travel between Oslo and Svolvær, if Leknes is not extended to full length for jet aircraft.
