= Civil Aviation Authority of Norway =

Norwegian government agency

Civil Aviation Authority of Norway logo

Emblem of former Norwegian Air Traffic and Airport Management

Norwegian Civil Aviation Authority (Norwegian: Luftfartstilsynet) is the Norwegian inspectorate responsible for civil aviation in Norway. It is subordinate to the Norwegian Ministry of Transport and Communications. Its head office is located in Bodø and it has an office in Oslo. Among its responsibilities is maintaining the Norwegian Civil Aircraft Register.

Formerly it was part of the Norwegian Civil Aviation Administration or the Civil Aviation Administration/Norway (NCAA), Luftfartsverket, but this was split into an inspectorate and an airport and air traffic management operator, Avinor.

== Lawsuits ==
A verdict at Oslo District Court, found that employees of the aviation authority had operated recklessly, and the authority was in 2011 sentenced to pay 2.3 million Norwegian kroner to plaintiff Roger Hansen of the Ocas lawsuit (Ocas-saken).)
