= Stokmarknes Airport =

Stokmarknes Airport Stokmarknes lufthavn

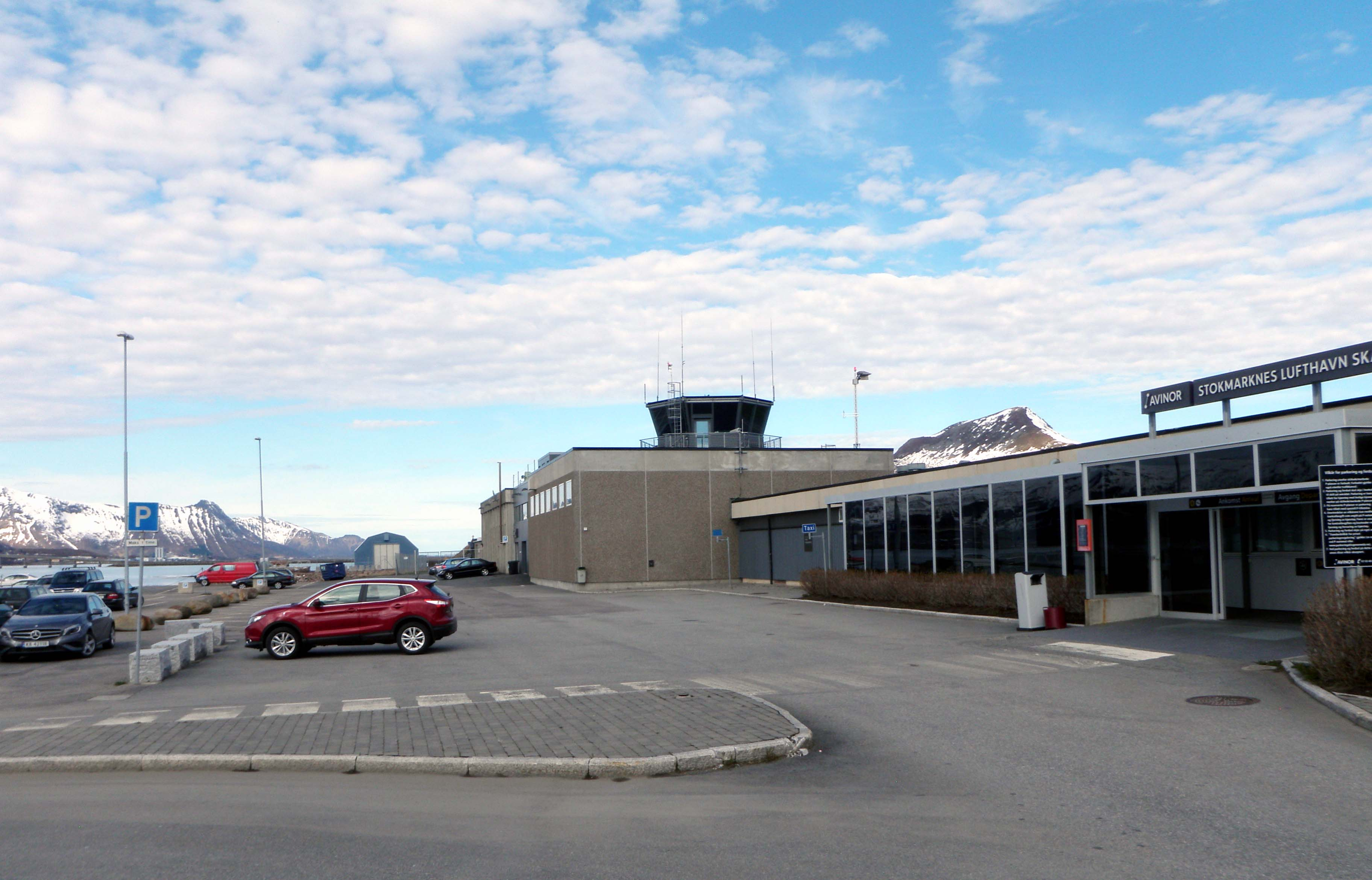
- IATA: SKN; ICAO: ENSK

Summary
- Airport type: Public
- Operator: Avinor
- Serves: Stokmarknes and Sortland
- Location: Skagen
- Elevation AMSL: 13 ft (4.0 m)
- Coordinates: 68°34′51″N 15°01′34″E
- Website: avinor.no

Map
- Location within Nordland Location within Norway

Runways
Direction	Length		Surface
Direction	ft	m	Surface
08/26	3,015	919	Asphalt

Statistics (2016)
- Passengers: 93,782
- Aircraft movements: 6,302
- Cargo (tonnes): N/A

Stokmarknes Airport (Norwegian: Stokmarknes lufthavn; IATA: SKN, ICAO: ENSK) is an airport in Hadsel Municipality in Nordland county, Norway. It is located on the island of Langøya, about 5 kilometres (3.1 mi) northeast of the town of Stokmarknes and about 20 kilometres (12 mi) southwest of the town of Sortland. Widerøe is the only approved scheduled air carrier to operate from the airport, using Canadian-built De Havilland Canada Dash 8 STOL (short take-off and landing) aircraft. Other frequent traffic includes ambulance flights (MEDEVAC) using Beechcraft Super King Airs operated by Babcock Scandinavian Air Ambulance.

== History ==
The airport opened 1 July 1972 as part of a government program of building a series of small airports along the coast. This was a major success and an important step for the population in the area (Vesterålen archipelago), who now could travel to the bigger cities of Norway and the rest of the world in one day, not weeks. Currently owned and operated by Avinor, the airport was managed by the Hadsel municipality for the first 20 years.

== Airlines and destinations ==
Airlines	Destinations
Widerøe	Andenes, Bodø, Tromsø; Seasonal: Oslo

== Statistics ==
Annual passenger traffic
Year	Passengers	% Change
2025	126,986	▲9.7%
2024	115,743	▲0.4%
2023	115,301	▲3.7%
2022	111,177	▲33.2%
2021	83,485	▲51.7%
2020	55,017	▼ -46.6%
2019	103,028	▼ -7.7%
2018	111,588	▼ -7.5%
2017	120,692	▲13.1%
2016	106,727	▼ -0.6%
2015	107,400	

== Extension ==
Work on extending RESA and improving the strip around the runway was completed in 2006. In March 2015, Avinor decided to postpone plans for extending the runway to 1199 meters.
