= List of Widerøe destinations =

Route map within Norway

Widerøe is the third-largest airline of Norway and the largest regional airline in the Nordic countries. They operate a fleet of 41 Bombardier Dash 8 aircraft to forty-three domestic and nine international destinations. Widerøe generates 40 percent of their traffic from public service obligations (PSO) with the Ministry of Transport and Communications. The company had a revenue of 2,500 million Norwegian krone, flew 380 daily flights and served two million passengers in 2012. The Bodø-based company has 1,300 employees.

Widerøe was founded in 1934. From the 1940s Widerøe started flying various seaplane routes for Norwegian Air Lines and later Scandinavian Airlines System (SAS). These routes were commonly flown using Noorduyn Norseman and de Havilland Canada Otter aircraft. From the mid-1960s a network of regional airports was built and Widerøe received the concession to operate the routes. The first four airports opened in Helgeland in 1968, followed by four in Sogn og Fjordane and Sunnmøre in 1971, three in Lofoten and Vesterålen in 1972, five in northern Troms and Finnmark in 1974 and another three by 1977. Originally these were served with the de Havilland Canada Twin Otter, supplemented with the de Havilland Canada Dash 7 from 1981.

Four additional regional airport opened in 1986 and 1987. The following three years Widerøe took over services at four airports from the failing Norving. Norsk Air was bought in 1989, making Sandefjord Airport, Torp a major base. The entire fleet was replaced with the de Havilland Canada Dash 8 between 1993 and 1995. From 1997 all subsidized routes became subject to PSOs, although Widerøe has been able to win most tenders. Except out of Torp, international scheduled flights commenced in 1994 and since Widerøe has provided a small range of international destinations as part of their network. Widerøe took over SAS Commuter's operations in Northern Norway in 2002 and SAS' operations in Western Norway in 2010.

== Destinations ==
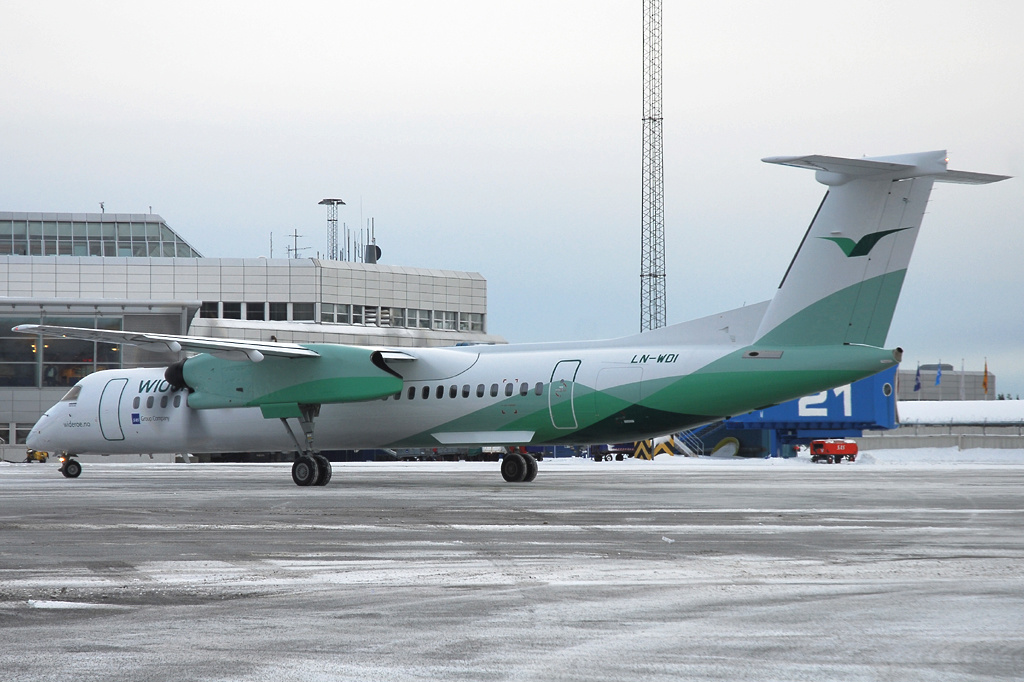
Bombardier Dash 8 Q400 at Bergen Airport, Flesland

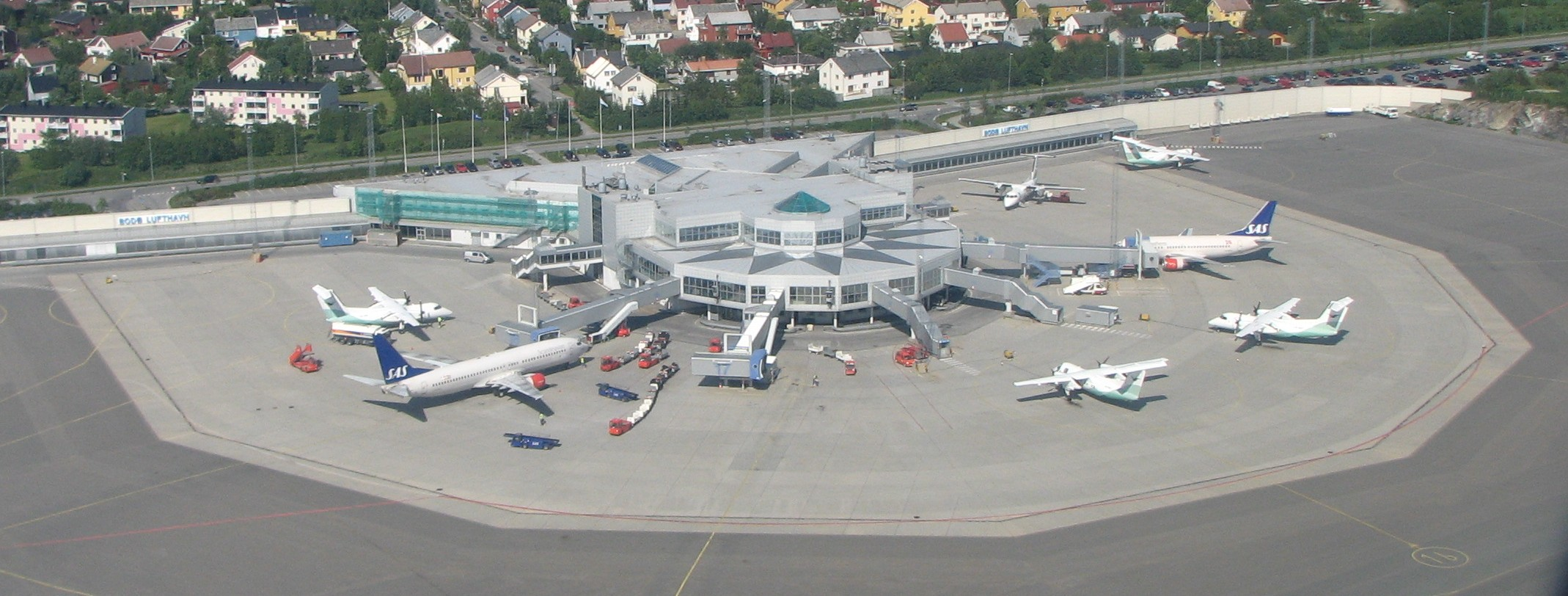
Bodø Airport

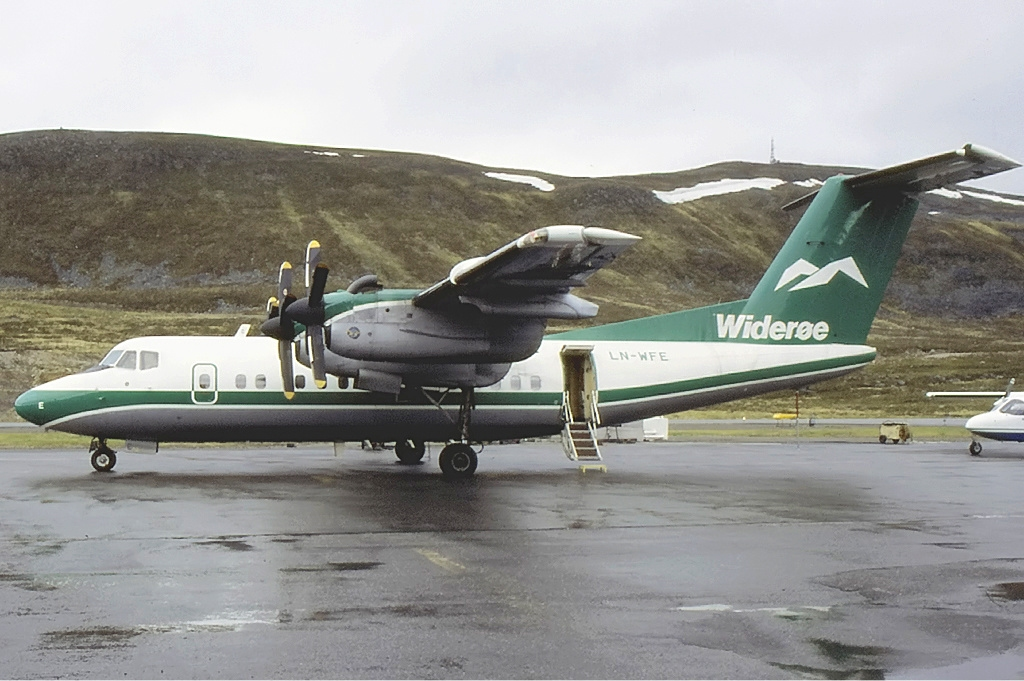
Dash 7 at Hammerfest Airport in 1987

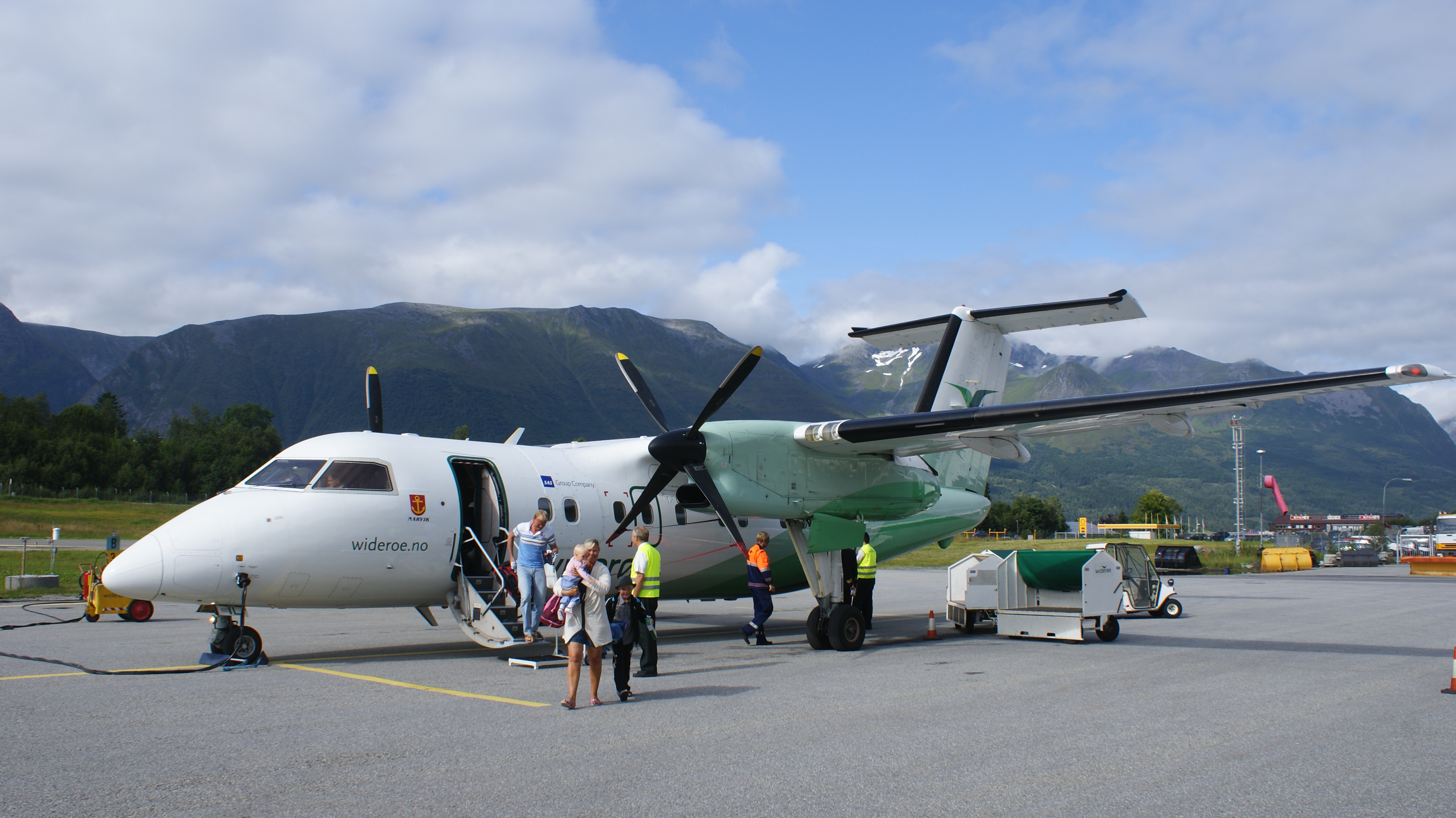
Ørsta–Volda Airport, Hovden

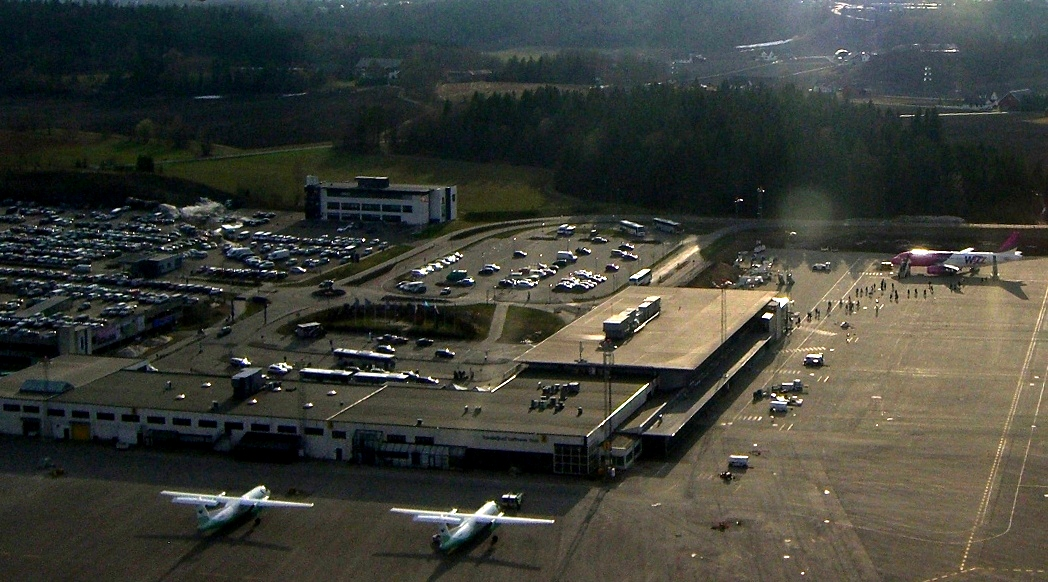
Sandefjord Airport, Torp

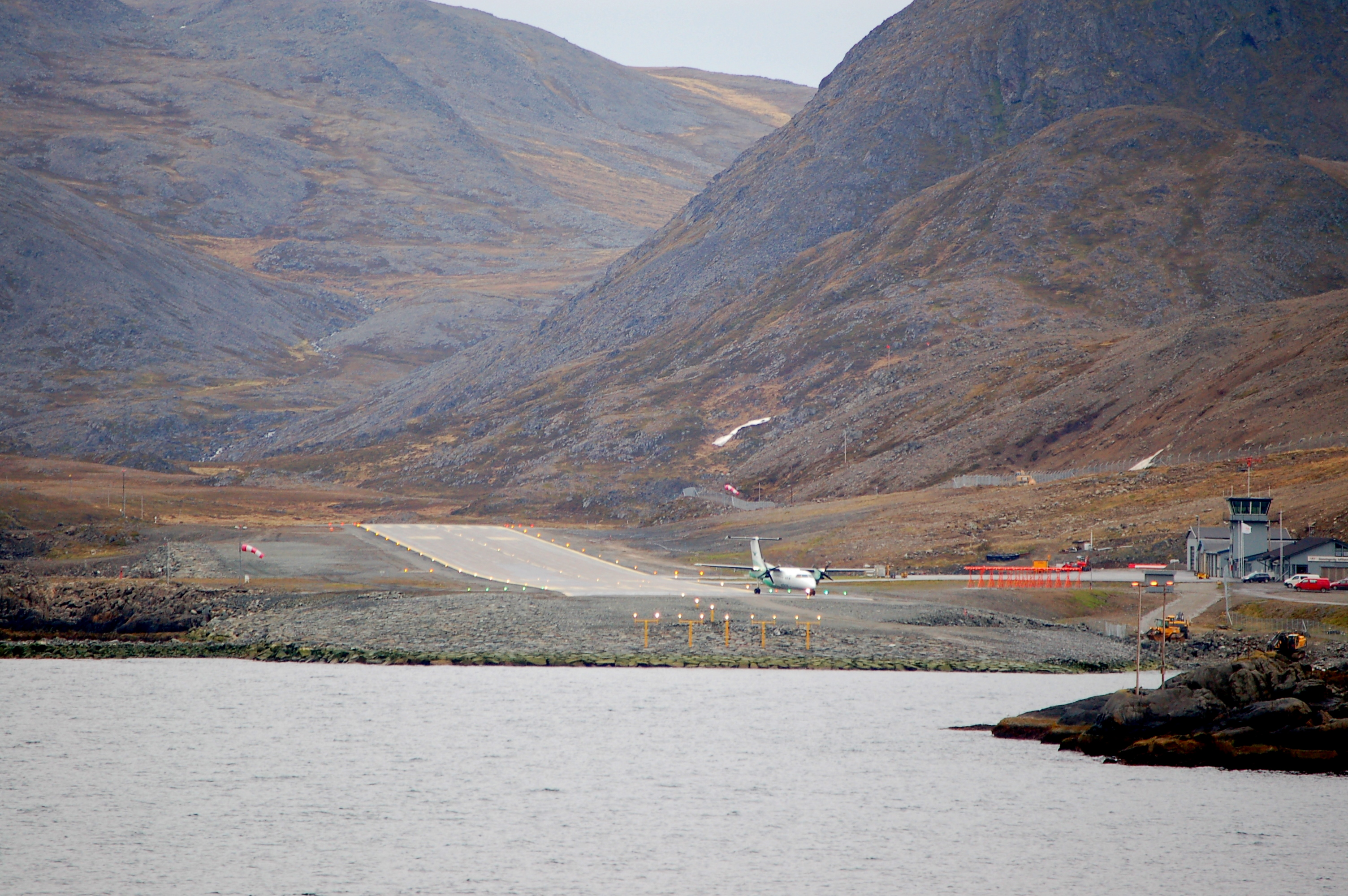
Honningsvåg Airport, Valan

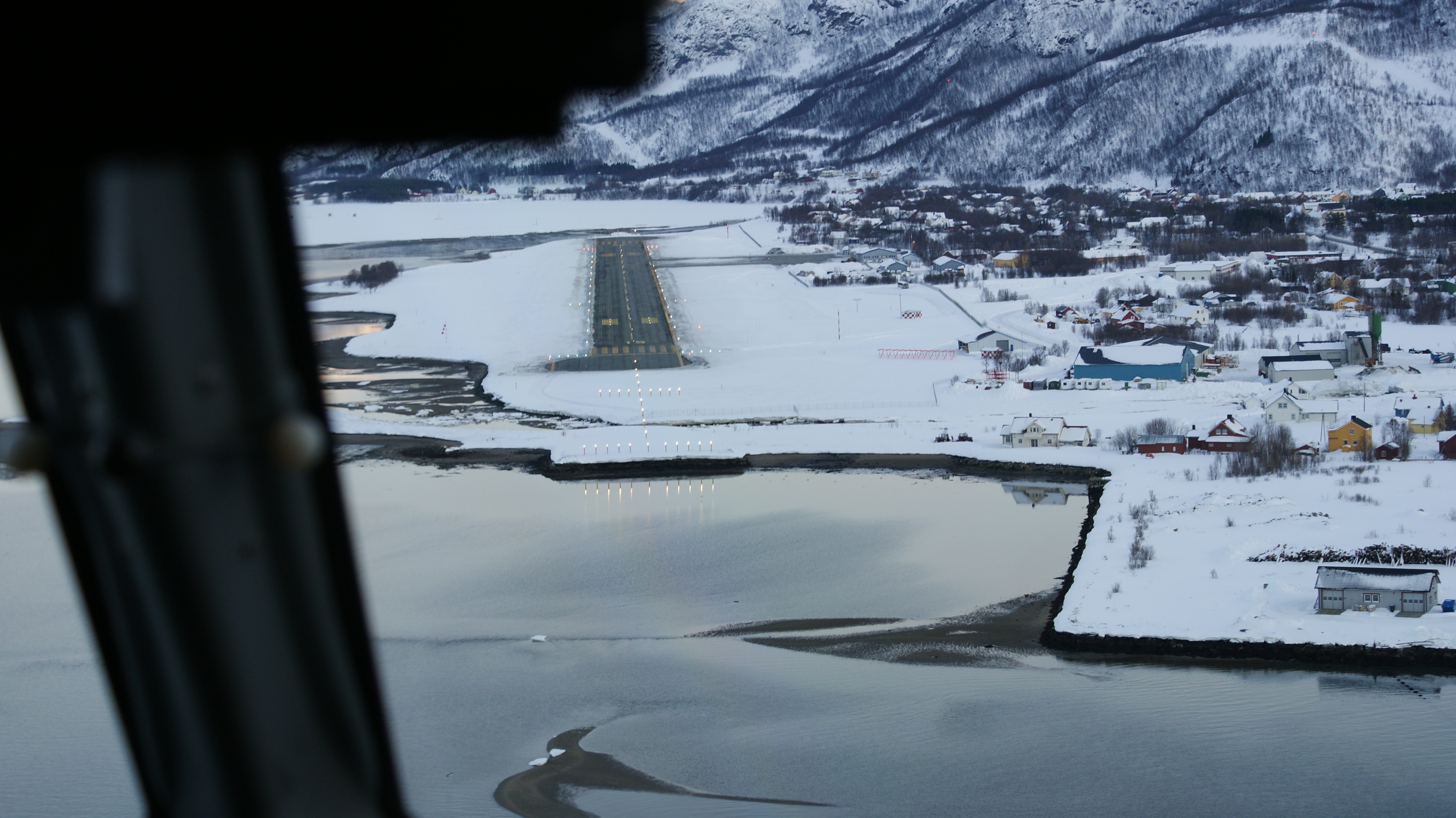
Sørkjosen Airport seen from the cockpit of a Widerøe Dash 8-300

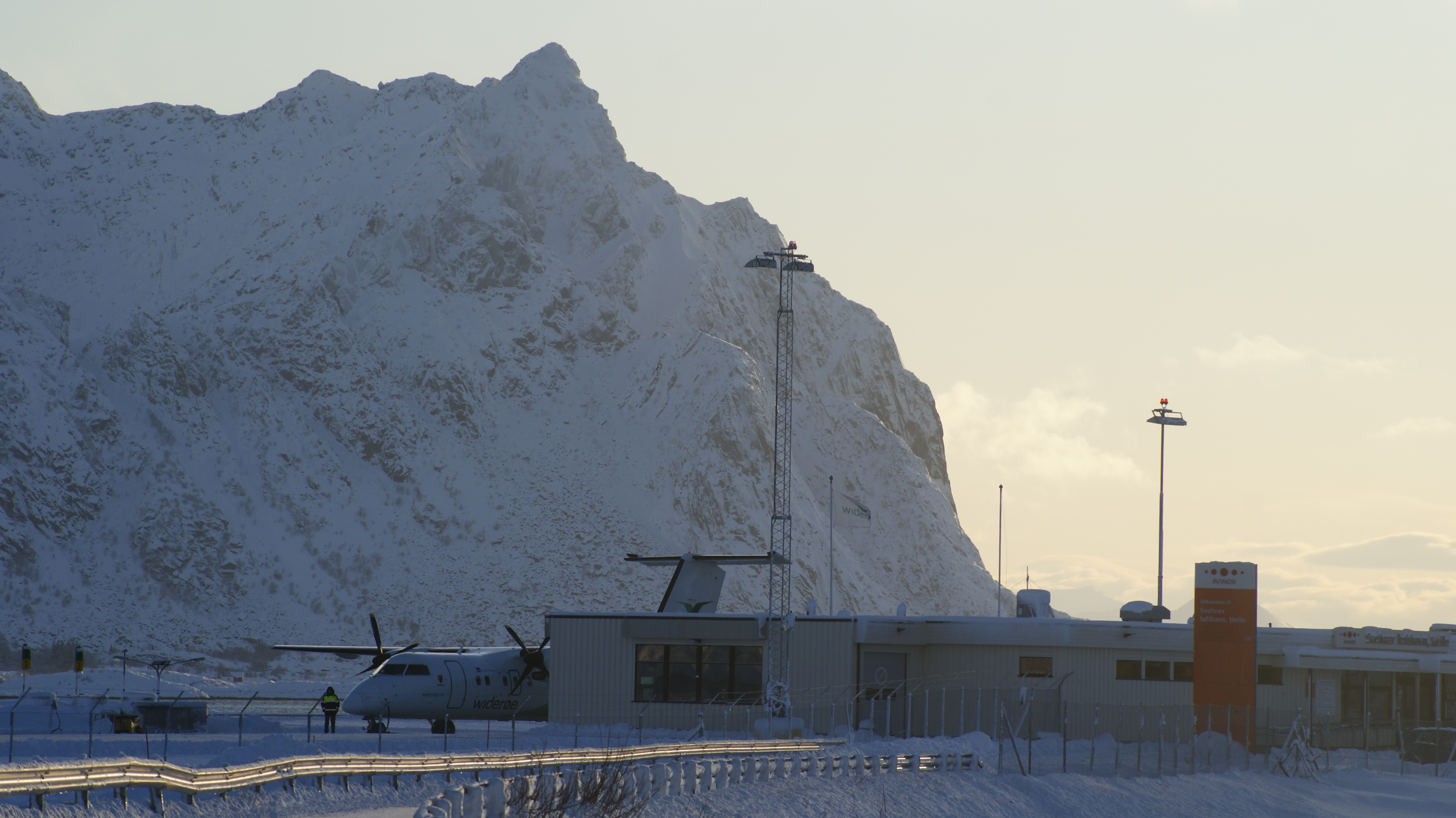
Svolvær Airport, Helle

*	Non-continuous service
	Terminated service
	Future service

List of Widerøe destinations
City	Country	Airport	Begin	End	Ref(s)
Aberdeen	United Kingdom	Aberdeen Airport	1999	—	
Ålesund	Norway	Ålesund Airport, Vigra	1971	—	
Alta	Norway	Alta Airport	1974	—	
Andenes	Norway	Andøya Air Station	—	—	
Bergen	Norway	Bergen Airport, Flesland	1971	—	
Berlin	Germany	Berlin Tempelhof Airport	1997	2001	
Billund	Denmark	Billund Airport	2018	—	
Båtsfjord	Norway	Båtsfjord Airport	1990		
Båtsfjord	Norway	Båtsfjord Airport	—		
Bodø	Norway	Bodø Airport	1968	—	
Brønnøysund	Norway	Brønnøysund Airport, Brønnøy	1968	—	
Berlevåg	Norway	Berlevåg Airport	1974	—	
Copenhagen	Denmark	Copenhagen Airport	1989	—	
Edinburgh	United Kingdom	Edinburgh Airport	2006	2011	
Fagernes	Norway	Fagernes Airport, Leirin	1999	2000	
Florø	Norway	Florø Airport	1971*	—	
Førde	Norway	Førde Airport, Bringeland	1986	—	
Førde	Norway	Førde Airport, Øyrane	1971	1986	
Glasgow	United Kingdom	Glasgow Airport	1997	1999	
Gothenburg	Sweden	Göteborg Landvetter Airport	1996	—	
Hemavan	Sweden	Hemavan Airport	1995	1995	
Hamburg	Germany	Hamburg Airport	2018	—	
Hammerfest	Norway	Hammerfest Airport	1974	—	
Haugesund	Norway	Haugesund Airport, Karmøy	2010*	—	
Honningsvåg	Norway	Honningsvåg Airport, Valan	1977	—	
Harstad/Narvik	Norway	Harstad/Narvik Airport, Evenes	1975*	—	
Hasvik	Norway	Hasvik Airport	1990	—	
Kirkenes	Norway	Kirkenes Airport, Høybuktmoen	1974	—	
Kristiansand	Norway	Kristiansand Airport, Kjevik	1991*	—	
Kristiansund	Norway	Kristiansund Airport, Kvernberget	1971*	—	
Lakselv	Norway	Lakselv Airport, Banak	1974	—	
Leknes	Norway	Leknes Airport	1972	—	
Sumburgh	United Kingdom	Sumburgh Airport	1995*	2005	
Liverpool	United Kingdom	Liverpool John Lennon Airport	2018	—	
London	United Kingdom	Heathrow Airport	2021	—	
London	United Kingdom	London Southend Airport	2020	2021	
London	United Kingdom	London Stansted Airport	1989*	—	
Mehamn	Norway	Mehamn Airport	1974	—	
Mo i Rana	Norway	Mo i Rana Airport, Røssvoll	1968	—	
Mosjøen	Norway	Mosjøen Airport, Kjærstad	1987	—	
Molde	Norway	Molde Airport, Årø	1972*	—	
Munich	Germany	Munich Airport	2018	—	
Murmansk	Russia	Murmansk Airport	1994	2000	
Namsos	Norway	Namsos Airport	1968	—	
Newcastle upon Tyne	United Kingdom	Newcastle International Airport	2006	—	
Ørland/Brekstad	Norway	Ørland Airport	1971	1987	
Ørsta/Volda	Norway	Ørsta–Volda Airport, Hovden	1971	—	
Oslo	Norway	Oslo Airport, Fornebu	1974	1998	
Oslo	Norway	Oslo Airport, Gardermoen	1998	—	
Rønne	Denmark	Bornholm Airport	2007	2010	
Røros	Norway	Røros Airport	2001*	2020	
Rørvik	Norway	Rørvik Airport, Ryum	1988	—	
Røst	Norway	Røst Airport	1986*	—	
Sandane	Norway	Sandane Airport, Anda	1975	—	
Sandefjord	Norway	Sandefjord Airport, Torp	1989	—	
Sandnessjøen	Norway	Sandnessjøen Airport, Stokka	1968	—	
Skien	Norway	Skien Airport, Geiteryggen	1989*	2015	
Sogndal	Norway	Sogndal Airport, Haukåsen	1971	—	
Sørkjosen	Norway	Sørkjosen Airport	1974	—	
Stavanger	Norway	Stavanger Airport, Sola	1989	—	
Stockholm	Sweden	Stockholm-Arlanda Airport	1999	2006	
Stockholm	Sweden	Stockholm-Bromma Airport	2020	—	
Stokmarknes	Norway	Stokmarknes Airport, Skagen	1972	—	
Svolvær	Norway	Svolvær Airport, Helle	1972	—	
Tromsø	Norway	Tromsø Airport, Langnes	1974	—	
Trondheim	Norway	Trondheim Airport, Værnes	1968	—	
Umeå	Sweden	Umeå Airport	1995	1995	
Værøy	Norway	Værøy Airport	1986	1990	
Vadsø	Norway	Vadsø Airport	1974	—	
Vagar	Faroe Islands	Vagar Airport	2021	—	
Vardø	Norway	Vardø Airport, Svartnes	1990	—	
Visby	Sweden	Visby Airport	2004	?	
