= Widerøe =

Regional airline of Norway

Widerøe's Flyveselskap AS

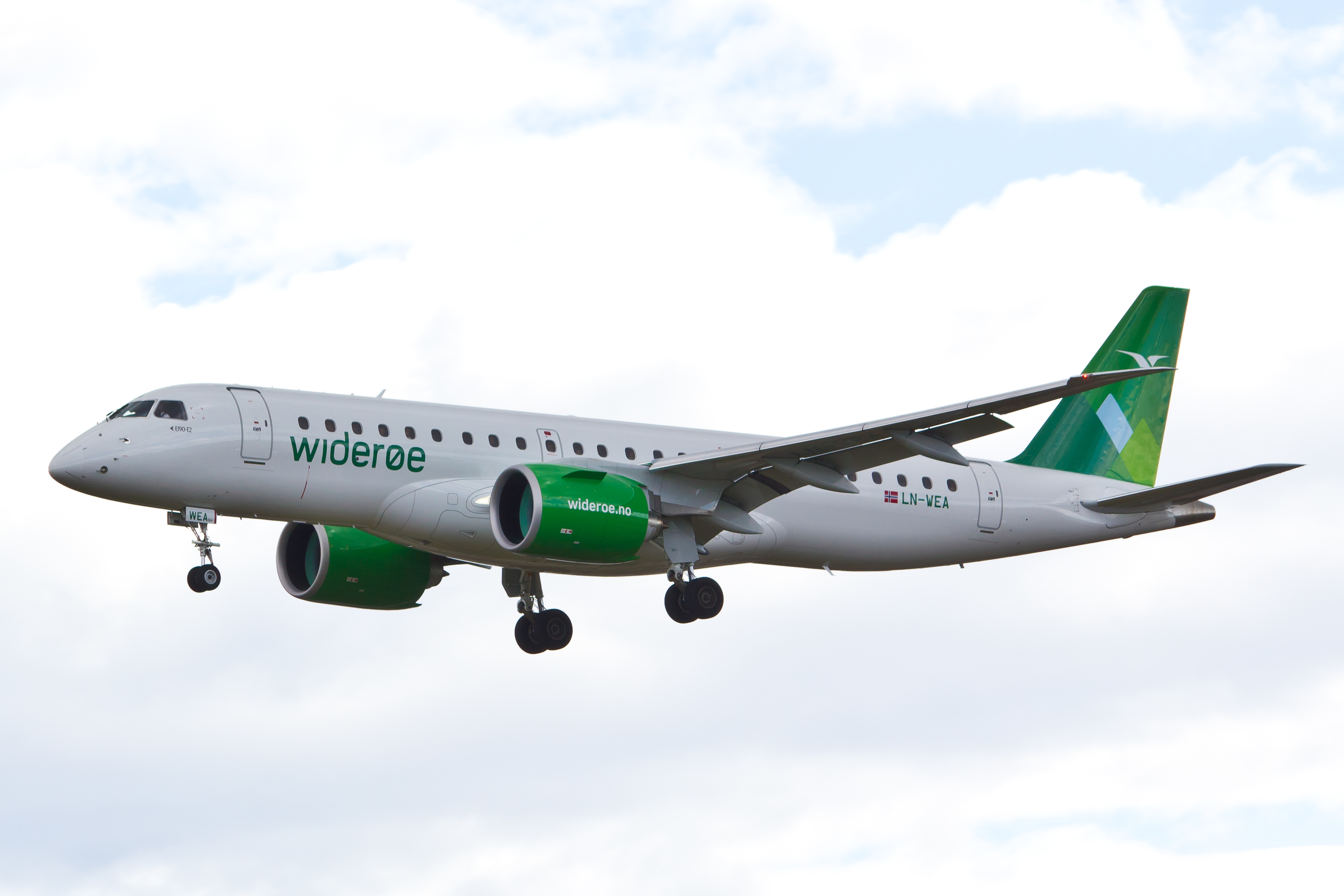
IATA	ICAO	Call sign
WF	WIF	WIDEROE
- Founded: 19 February 1934; 92 years ago
- Operating bases: Bergen; Bodø; Oslo; Sandefjord; Tromsø
- Frequent-flyer program: Norwegian Reward
- Fleet size: 50
- Destinations: 56
- Parent company: Norwegian Air Shuttle
- Headquarters: Bodø, Norway
- Key people: Tore Jenssen (CEO)
- Founder: Viggo Widerøe
- Employees: 3,500
- Website: www.wideroe.no

Widerøe's Flyveselskap AS, trading as Widerøe, is a Norwegian regional airline and the largest regional airline operating in the Nordic countries. The airline operates a fleet of around 50 aircraft, consisting primarily of De Havilland Dash 8 turboprops and a small number of Embraer E190-E2 jets. It serves about 50 destinations, including a domestic network of 41 airports across Norway, with more than 400 departures daily. Approximately half of its routes consist of public service obligation (PSO) routes subsidized by the Norwegian government, connecting smaller communities to primary airports.

Established in 1934 by Viggo Widerøe, the airline initially engaged in general aviation and seaplane operations. During the 1960s and 1970s, Widerøe introduced scheduled flights to a new network of regional STOLports in northern and western Norway. After periods of ownership under the SAS Group and later Torghatten ASA, Widerøe became a subsidiary of Norwegian Air Shuttle following its acquisition in January 2024.

== History ==
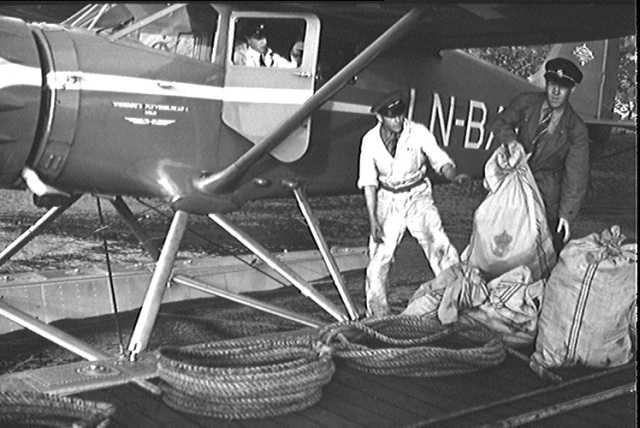
Loading post onto a Stinson Reliant in Oslo in 1936

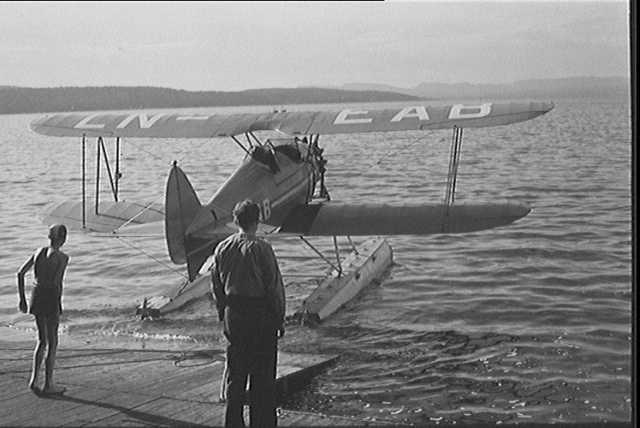
A Waco RNF at Ingierstand in 1937

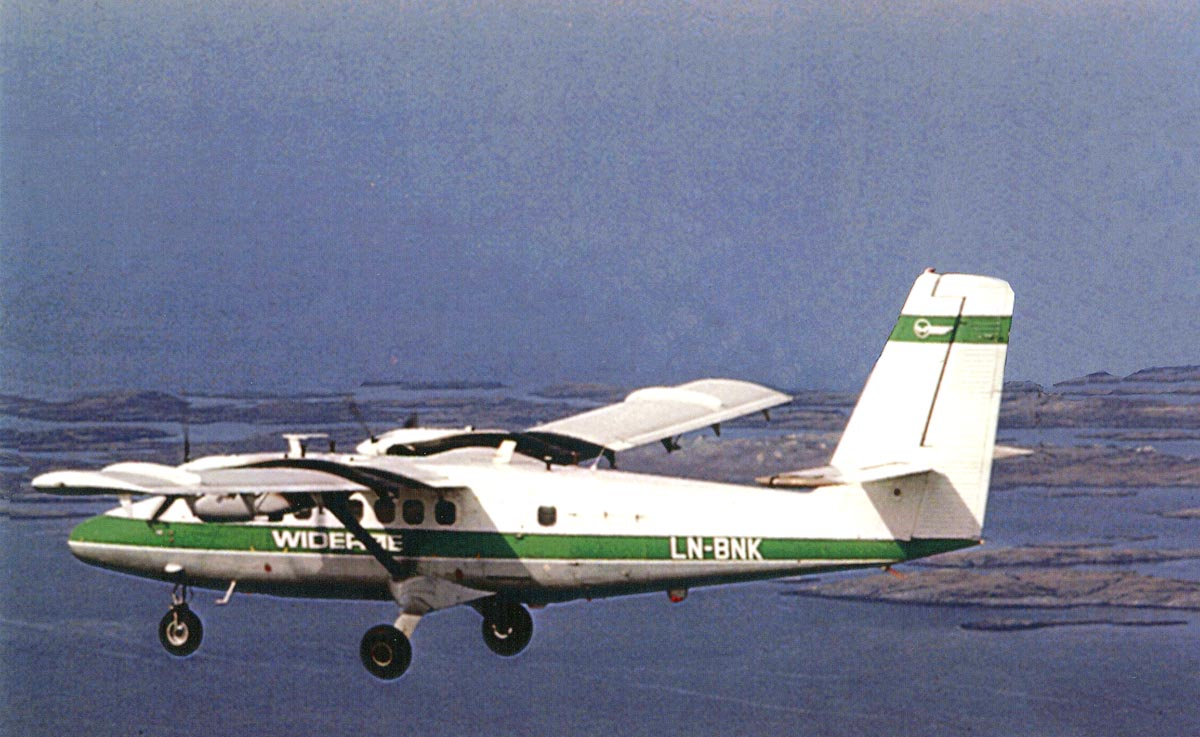
A De Havilland Canada DHC-6 Twin Otter in 1970

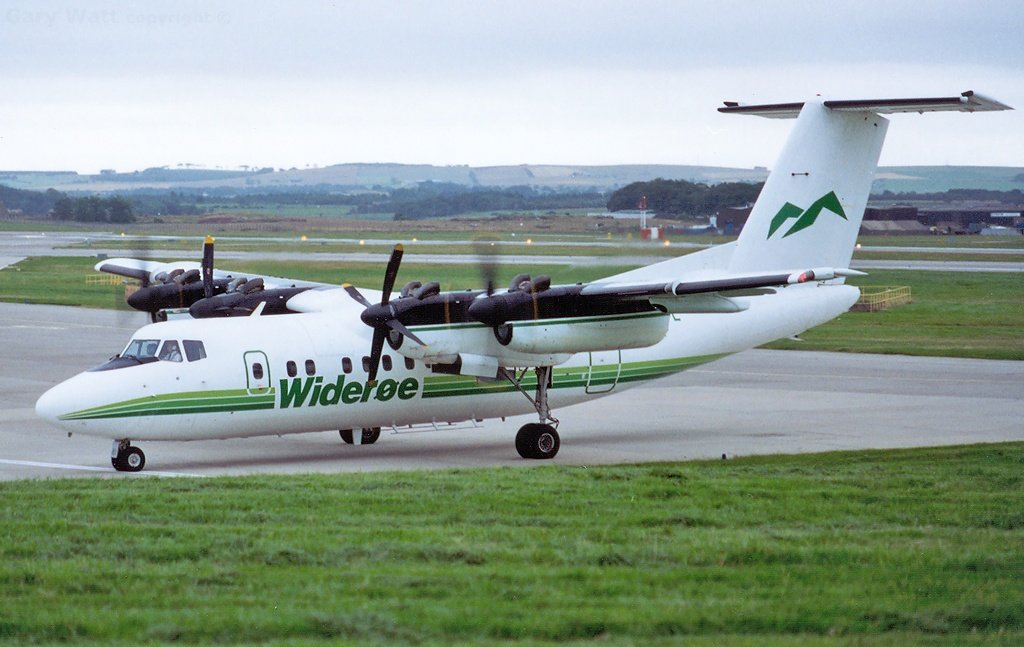
A De Havilland Canada DHC-7 Dash 7 at Aberdeen Airport in 1993

The airline was established in 1934 by Viggo Widerøe, a Norwegian aviator, and was engaged in various general aviation activities in its early days. In 1936, Widerøe started scheduled seaplane flights and, from 1940, also ambulance flights. During the 1940s and 1950s, the airline increased its seaplane routes and established a fleet based on De Havilland Canada DHC-3 Otter and Noorduyn Norseman aircraft. From 1968, Widerøe started flying to STOLports in northern and western Norway using DHC-6 Twin Otters, and later also with Dash 7 aircraft. In 1989, Widerøe bought Norsk Air and started services from Sandefjord.

Widerøe was established on the foundations of two small aircraft operators. The first was the company Lotsberg & Skappel. The other was Widerøe & Bjørneby, which was founded by Viggo Widerøe and Halvor Bjørneby. During the winter, they stationed aircraft at mountain resorts and made revenue from flying skiers into the wilderness. Aerial advertising flights were introduced, in which a company or product name was painted on an aircraft's fuselage, with a neon-light version underneath, and leaflets dropped mid-flight.

On 19 February 1934, Widerøe's Flyveselskap A/S was founded by Viggo Widerøe, Einar Isdahl, and Arild Widerøe. In 1935, the company started in the cartography business. In 1937, the company made 44 flights along the coast of Antarctica, covering 4,000 kilometres (2,500 mi) of coast at least 50 kilometres (31 mi) inland. These flights were ordered by Lars Christensen for cartography. During 1938, the company's Bogstad workshop and Birger Hønningstad started a joint venture in which Widerøe built Hønningstad Norge aircraft.

Following the outbreak of World War II, all pilots were conscripted into the military and there was a ban on civilian aviation. In 1940, the company started air ambulance flights for the military. Following the German invasion of Norway, many of Widerøe's pilots and aircraft were flown to Mjøsa where they served as part of the defence. All civilian aircraft were grounded during the occupation, and German authorities demanded that magnetos and propellers be handed in. The workshop at Bogstad was kept busy with the production of ambulance sleds for the German military. In secret, the company also started building the Hønningstad C-5 Polar ambulance aircraft at Bogstad.

After the liberation of Norway in 1945, there was still a flight ban, and the employees at Bogstad were hired by the Royal Norwegian Air Force at Oslo Airport, Fornebu. The company received permission to fly from 2 February 1946. In 1947, Forenede Industrier bought the majority of the company. Viggo Widerøe was again hired as managing director.

In 1948, the company merged with Narvik-based Polarfly, and changed its name to Widerøe's Flyveselskap & Polarfly A/S. The following year, the company began an aerial photography operation. In 1953, the company chose to differentiate and started production of emergency rafts; refrigerated garages in aluminium; and thermoelements for industry. In 1954, the company received a subcontract from Scandinavian Airlines System (SAS), the successor of DNL, to operate a seaplane route from Tromsø via Alta, Hammerfest, and Kirkenes to Vadsø. For this route, the company bought its first De Havilland Canada DHC-3 Otter. On 1 July 1958, the company changed its name back to Widerøe's Flyveselskap A/S.

In 1969, Per Bergsland replaced Viggo Widerøe as CEO. In 1970, the company was split in two: the aerial photography division was sold to competitor Fjellanger, and the new company Fjellanger Widerøe was created. Scheduled services remained with Widerøe. The airline's last seaplane was decommissioned in 1971. In April 1980, Widerøe started an international service on behalf of SAS.

During the 1990s, Widerøe replaced all its aircraft with Dash 8 aircraft; in the 2000s it was bought by the SAS Group and took over SAS Commuter's operations in northern Norway. In 2010, Widerøe took over regional SAS services in western Norway. In 2013, SAS Group sold 80% of the shares to WF Holding, an investment company controlled by Torghatten ASA, and in June 2016 the remaining 20% of the shares were also transferred to WF Holding, ending SAS ownership of Widerøe. The airline remained a close regional partner of SAS until 2023. In July 2023, Norwegian Air Shuttle announced a deal to acquire Widerøe for 1.125 billion kr (US$104 million), which was finalised in January 2024.

Public service obligation services to regional airports make up slightly less than half of Widerøe's operations. The remaining services are to primary airports in northern Norway, and services from Sandefjord and Bergen to other primary airports, and some international services from Oslo, Sandefjord, Kristiansand, Stavanger, Bergen, and Trondheim. Widerøe's operations are focused on point-to-point transit, although the airline essentially feeds medium-haul and international airlines. Widerøe has interlining agreements with other airlines.

== Destinations ==
Widerøe has been awarded public service obligation contracts by the Ministry of Transport and Communications to connect regional airports to primary airports. Twenty-five such airports were served in a contract running from 1 April 2009 to 31 March 2012, with the company having lost the bid for services to three. The services connect smaller communities and towns to regional centers and to primary airports that provide onwards service with jet aircraft.

Eight airports in Finnmark county and one in Troms county are connected to Tromsø Airport, with a limited number of services also connecting to two of the three primary airports in Finnmark—Alta and Kirkenes. Between Tromsø and Bodø, Widerøe serves six airports, of which two connect to Tromsø and all to Bodø. South of Bodø, there are six airports in Helgeland and Namdalen, which are all connected to Bodø and Trondheim Airport, Værnes. In Sogn og Fjordane and Sunnmøre, Widerøe connects four airports to Oslo Airport, Gardermoen and Bergen Airport, Flesland.

Widerøe's main domestic routes between primary airports are from its base at Sandefjord Airport, Torp. Services are provided up to five times per day to Trondheim, Stavanger and Bergen, as well as seasonal services to Bodø and Tromsø. In Northern Norway, Widerøe operates some services connecting primary airports, including the links from Tromsø to Alta, Hammerfest, Kirkenes and Vadsø Airport, and connecting Harstad/Narvik Airport, Evenes to Tromsø, Bodø and Trondheim.

International services are provided to and from five Norwegian airports to seven foreign airports in Sweden, Denmark and the United Kingdom. From Sandefjord and Trondheim, Widerøe flies Copenhagen Airport. From Oslo, Widerøe operates four daily services to Göteborg Landvetter Airport, as well as summer routes to Visby Airport and Bornholm Airport. From Bergen and Stavanger, Widerøe serves Aberdeen Airport. From Bergen Widerøe flies to Liverpool John Lennon Airport and London Heathrow and from Stavanger; Newcastle Airport.

In 2010, Widerøe took over regional routes previously operated by SAS in Western Norway; these connect Kristiansand and Kristiansund Airport, Kvernberget to Stavanger and Bergen, and Haugesund and Molde to Bergen. These routes will replace the SAS Fokker 50 aircraft with -300 and Q400 aircraft.

In 2016, the airline was awarded a five-year contract by the Norwegian Ministry of Transport and Communications to operate 13 of Norway's Public Service Obligation routes and started operating the routes in April 2017.

=== Codeshare agreements ===
Widerøe has codeshare agreements with the following airlines (as of May 2026):

- Air France
- Finnair
- KLM
- Lufthansa

== Fleet ==
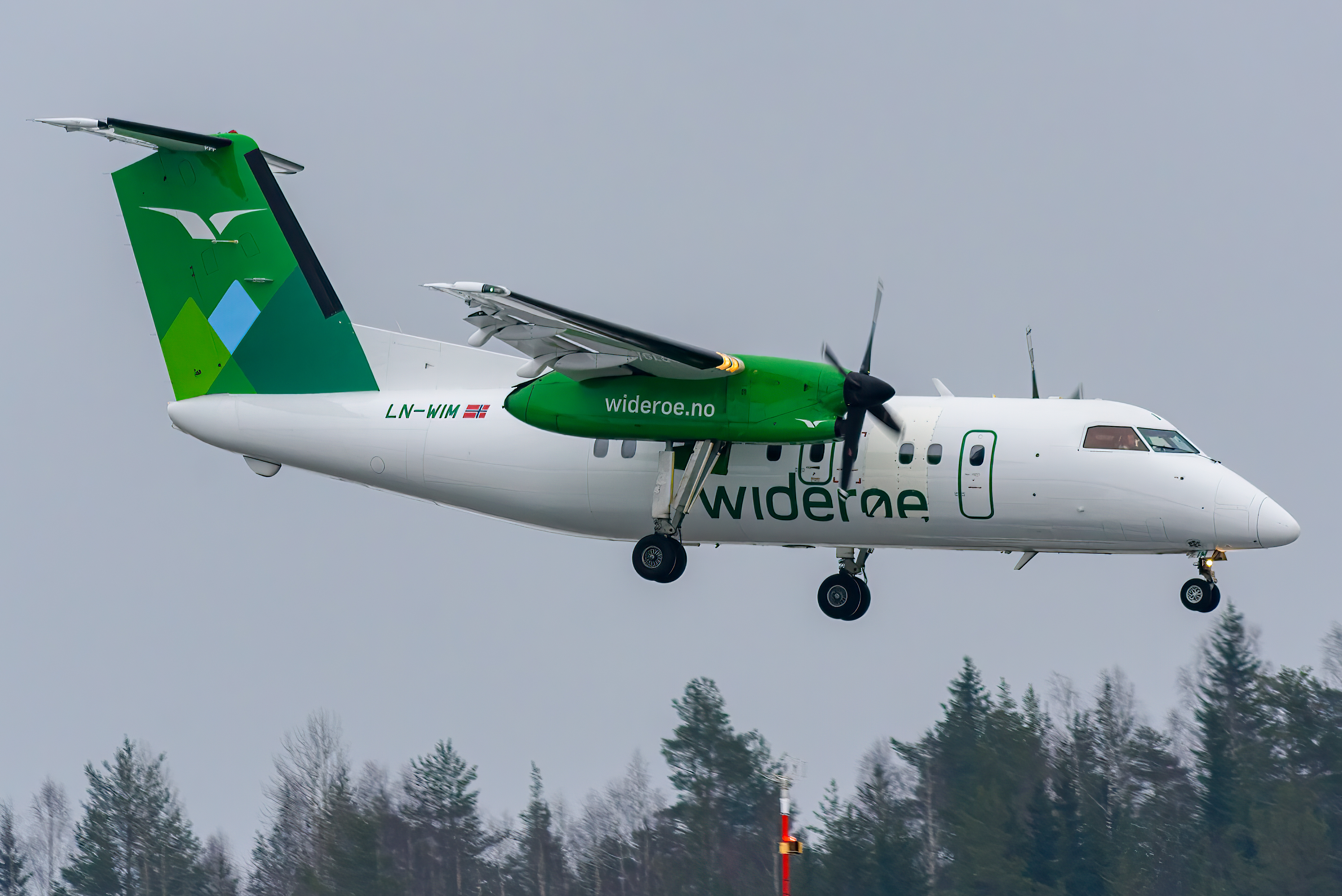
Widerøe Dash 8-100

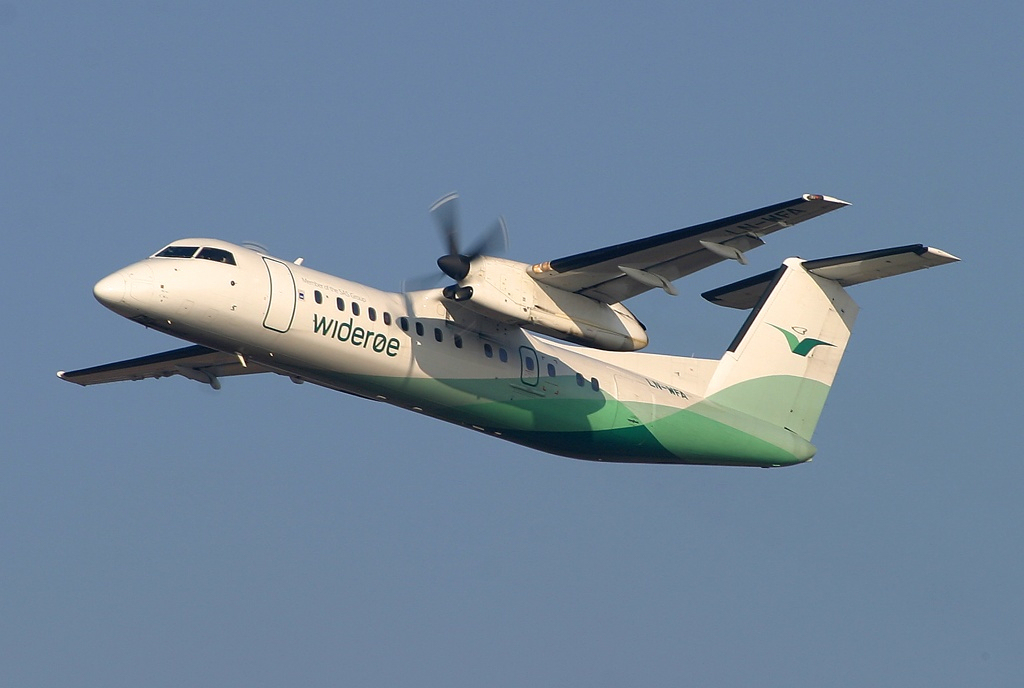
Widerøe Dash 8-300

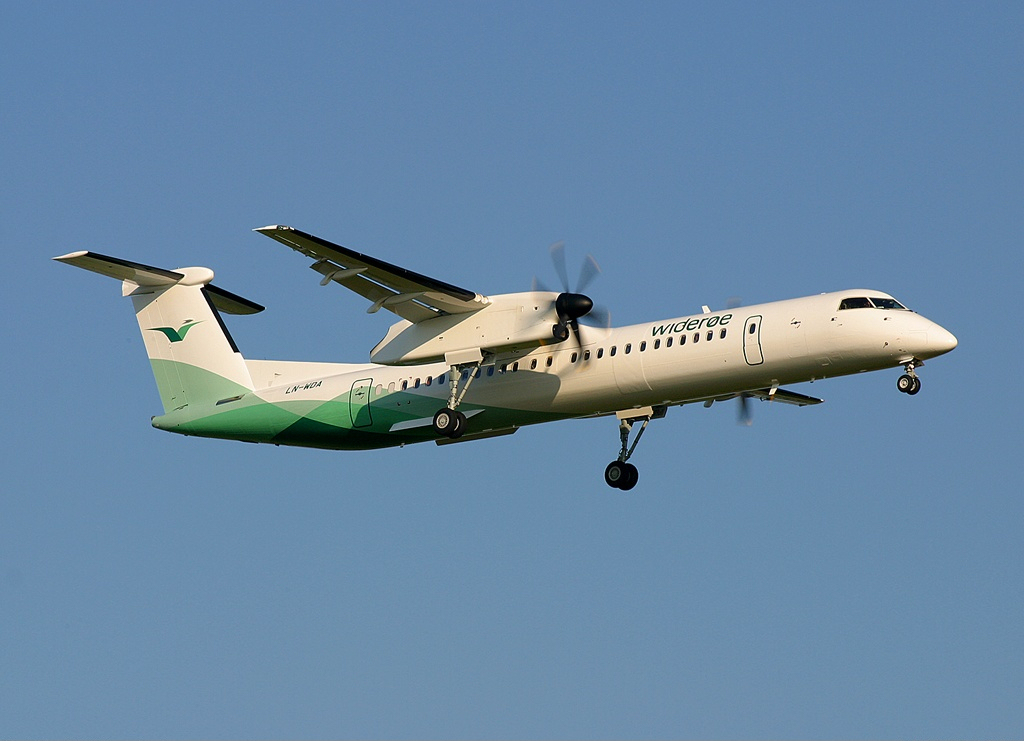
Widerøe Dash 8-400

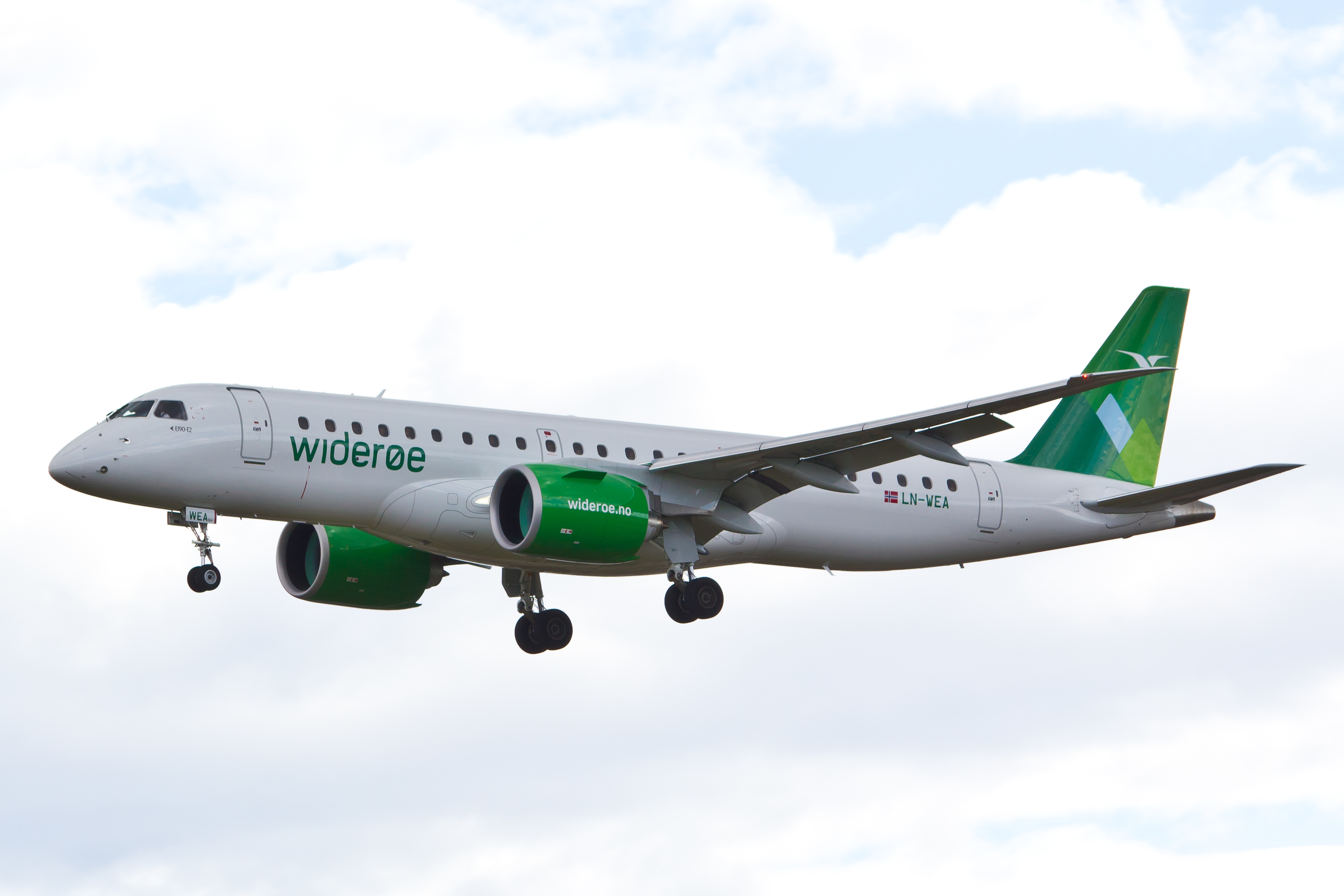
Widerøe Embraer E190-E2

=== Current fleet ===
As of August 2025, Widerøe operates the following aircraft:

Widerøe fleet
Aircraft	In service	Orders	Passengers	Notes
De Havilland Canada Dash 8-100	22	—	39	
De Havilland Canada Dash 8-200	4	—	39	
De Havilland Canada Dash 8-300	3	—	50	
De Havilland Canada Dash 8-400	18	—	78	Former Scandinavian Airlines aircraft
Embraer E190-E2	3	—	110	Launch customer.
Embraer E195-E2	—	2	TBD	Deliveries from Q1 2028.
Total	50	—		

=== Fleet development ===
Between 2000 and 2018, the airline operated exclusively De Havilland Canada/Bombardier Dash 8 aircraft. As of 2018, Widerøe was the world's largest operator of the Dash 8-100 series, after Piedmont Airlines retired their fleet. As of 2013, Widerøe is the first and only airline in the world to operate every single variant of the Dash 8 simultaneously, and is one of the few airlines to ever operate all variants of the Dash 8, as well as the older DHC-6 Twin Otter and Dash 7.

In January 2017, Widerøe announced it had signed a contract with Embraer for up to 15 new Embraer E190-E2 jets, with firm orders for three E190-E2 aircraft and purchase rights on 12 more jets from the Embraer E2 family. The airline is the first operator of the E190-E2 aircraft. The aircraft is Widerøe's first jet aircraft, after previously operating an all-turboprop fleet. In April 2018, Wideroe received its first Embraer E190-E2. The delivery was the first E2 aircraft to be delivered to an airline. It was handed over to Wideroe by Embraer in a large ceremony, with both Embraer and Wideroe staff as well as media present. Its first revenue flight occurred on 24 April 2018.

The Dash 8-100, Dash 8-200 and Dash 8-300 can operate on the many short runway airports in Norway, on which Widerøe is the main operator. Widerøe was the launch customer of Dash 8-100 extended service program. The program extends the economic life of the turboprop by 100% to 160,000 flight cycles. Widerøe plans to replace most of its Dash-8 aircraft by 2030.

== Service ==
Norwegian Reward frequent flyer points can be earned on all international routes and certain commercial domestic routes. Points can be redeemed on international routes and domestic non PSO routes.

== Incidents and accidents ==
- On 5 March 1964, a Douglas DC-3 caught fire before takeoff at Oslo Airport, Fornebu. All 18 occupants survived, but the aircraft was written off.
- On 28 March 1968, an Otter seaplane crashed at Rossfjordstraumen. There were no fatalities, but the aircraft was written off.
- On 11 March 1982, Widerøe Flight 933, operated by a Twin Otter registered LN-BNK, crashed into the Barents Sea near Gamvik, en route from Berlevåg Airport to Mehamn Airport. All investigations have concluded that the crash resulted from the structural failure of the aircraft's tail caused by severe clear-air turbulence. However, there has been significant controversy surrounding this, as claims have been made that the aircraft collided with a Harrier jump jet of the British Royal Air Force flying outside its designated operations area during a NATO exercise.
- On 6 May 1988, Widerøe Flight 710, operated by a Dash 7, crashed near Brønnøysund, killing all 36 passengers on board in the worst-ever Dash 7 accident. The accident occurred when the aircraft, on approach from Namsos Airport, descended from 1500 ft to 550 ft too early in the landing procedure, colliding with the mountain Torghatten.
- On 12 April 1990, Widerøe Flight 839, operated by a Twin Otter, crashed into the sea one minute after take-off from Værøy Airport, killing all five on board. The crash was caused by strong and unpredictable wind gusts during take-off, which had exceeded the aircraft's structural limits and created a break-up of its rudder, rendering it uncontrollable. The airport was closed down after the accident and replaced by Værøy Heliport.
- On 27 October 1993, Widerøe Flight 744, operated by a Twin Otter, crashed while approaching Namsos Airport, Høknesøra en route from Trondheim Airport, Værnes, killing the crew and 4 passengers. Having descended from 1,100 feet (340 m), the aircraft was supposed to stabilize at an altitude of 500 feet (150 m) but instead continued to descend, until it crashed into a ridge 6 kilometres (3.7 mi) from the airport.
- On 14 June 2001, the starboard main undercarriage of a Dash 8-100 aircraft collapsed on landing at Båtsfjord Airport after a flight from Alta Airport, resulting in substantial damage to the aircraft. No injuries were reported to the three crew and 24 passengers on board. The aircraft, LN-WIS, was written off.
- On 1 May 2005, a Dash 8-100 registered LN-WIK made a hard landing at Hammerfest Airport. Just before landing the wind speed veered and increased, creating a tailwind. The increase in the descent rate was compensated but was insufficient, and the aircraft touched down on the right main landing gear, with the leg failing and the aircraft sliding on its belly. The aircraft was written off and Widerøe was criticized for permitting landings under high winds and gusts. The Norwegian Civil Aviation Authority imposed stricter wind regulations on the airport.
- On 15 September 2010, Dash 8-100 LN-WIF made an emergency landing at Sandnessjøen Airport, Stokka. Just before landing, the aircraft was hit by a strong gust of wind and the starboard landing gear collapsed upon landing. There were 3 passengers and 4 crew aboard, all were evacuated safely.
- On 7 December 2017, Dash 8-100 LN-WID crashed into a towing truck during a storm at Bodø Airport. Just after landing, the aircraft requested a towing truck to tow them to the gate due to heavy wind and slippery surface. The truck was taken by the wind and hit the propeller. There were no injuries amongst the passengers and crew.
