= Widerøe Flight 839 =

1990 aviation accident in Norway

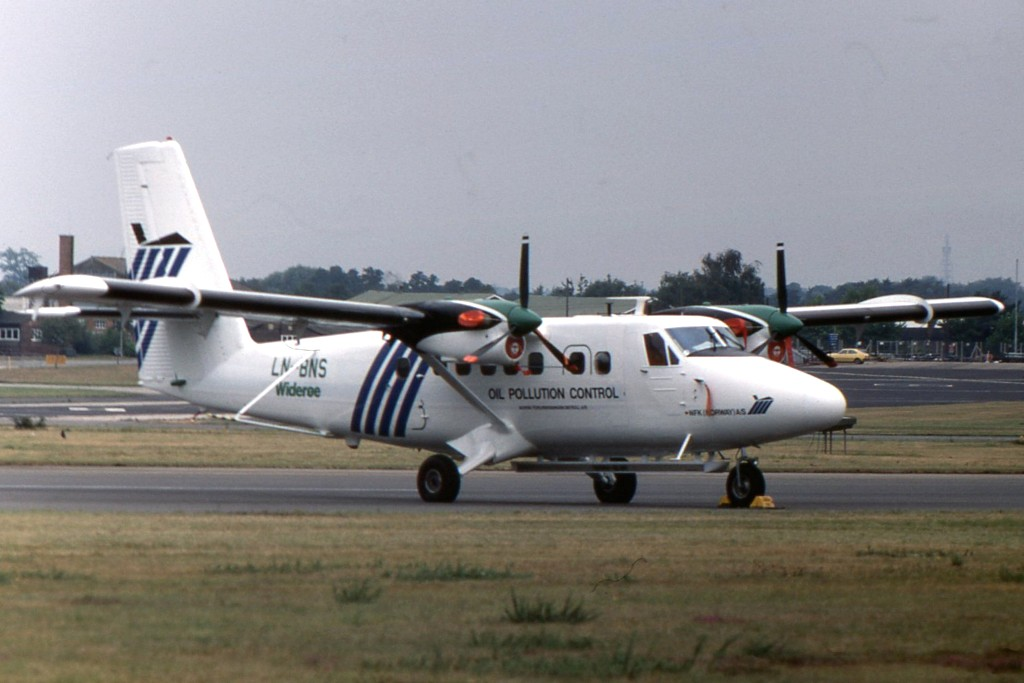
- LN-BNS, the aircraft involved in the accident, seen in 1984 with a previous livery

Accident
- Date: 12 April 1990
- Summary: Structural failure due to pilot taking off in above-tolerance winds, unsafe airport location
- Site: Værøy Airport, Værøy, Norway; 67°41′N 012°40′E

Aircraft
- Aircraft type: De Havilland Canada DHC-6 Twin Otter
- Operator: Widerøe
- Registration: LN-BNS
- Flight origin: Værøy Airport
- Destination: Bodø Airport
- Occupants: 5
- Passengers: 3
- Crew: 2
- Fatalities: 5
- Survivors: 0

Widerøe Flight 839, also known as the Værøy Accident (Norwegian: Værøy-ulykken), was a de Havilland Canada Twin Otter that crashed shortly after takeoff from Værøy Airport in Værøy Municipality in Lofoten, Norway. The accident occurred on 12 April 1990 at 14:44, killing all five people on board. The cause of the accident was strong winds that exceeded the structure's tolerance, causing the tail rudder and tailplane to crack and the aircraft to become uncontrollable. Impact occurred 63 seconds after takeoff and 8 seconds after the crack. The aircraft crashed into the water and a search was conducted for several days to locate the wreckage.

Uneven and strong winds had given the airport low regularity, and prior to takeoff, wind speeds of 57 knots (29 m/s; 106 km/h) had been recorded. As a result of the accident, the airport was permanently closed and replaced by Værøy Heliport. The incident was investigated by the Norwegian Accident Investigation Board, which published its conclusions in 1991, including a finding that the pilot should not have landed with the amounts of wind that were reported, and definitively should not have taken off with winds above tolerance levels. Three years later, a new investigation was conducted, after an engineer had stated that the cause of the accident could have been fatigue instead. The second investigation came to the same conclusion as the first, and all the parties involved have since supported the causes stated in the initial report.

== Background ==
=== Aircraft ===
The aircraft involved in the accident was a de Havilland Canada DHC-6-300 Twin Otter. Registered LN-BNS with serial number 536, it was delivered to Widerøe on 27 April 1977. It was insured with Norsk Flyforsikringspool. At the time of the accident, LN-BNS had flown a total of 58,709 cycles, equivalent to operating for 27,304 hours.

=== Occupants ===
The crew consisted of 40-year-old Captain Idar Nils Persen and 31-year-old First Officer Arnt Vidar Grønneflåta.

Captain Persen was hired by Widerøe as a first officer in December 1982 and was promoted to captain in February 1989. He had a total of almost 5,500 flight hours, including nearly 1,300 as pilot in command. First Officer Grønneflåta was hired by Widerøe in June 1989 and had a total of 1,370 flight hours, 350 of which were as a commander pilot. Prior to his employment with the airline, he had been a flight instructor since April 1988.

The passengers were Stig Myrvoll, 25; Frank Bakkeli, 27; and Runa Dagny Søraa, 23.

== Accident ==
Widerøe Flight 839 was a scheduled flight from Værøy Airport to Bodø Airport operated by a de Havilland Canada DHC-6-300 Twin Otter. The aircraft left Bodø Airport at 13:36 as Flight 838 to Røst Airport, where it landed at 14:04. It continued to Værøy as Flight 839, leaving Røst at 14:14. During this flight the crew received information that the wind at the east end of the runway was from 270°, varying from 18 to 26 knots (9.3 to 13.4 m/s; 33 to 48 km/h) — a moderate gale. When the plane landed at 14:30, the tower had stated that the wind was from 270° and max 23 knots (43 km/h). The crew commented on the wind after landing and stated that the wind blew from all directions. At Værøy Airport, three passengers disembarked, two passengers boarded, and the plane fueled. There was also a passenger in transit from Røst to Bodø, so the total ridership was three passengers, plus the two pilots. Take-off weight was 4,548.5 kilograms (10,028 lb), including 640 kg (1,410 lb) of fuel.

The aircraft taxied to runway 25. During the departure briefing, the captain decided not to follow the company's standard procedure and have a climb at 320° instead of 280°. Maximum measured wind had been recorded at 57 knots (29 m/s; 106 km/h) while the aircraft had been parked. The aircraft asked for clearance at 14:42:10; this was granted, and the air control informed that the wind at the west end was between 210° and 290°, varying from 18 to 34 knots (9.3 to 17.5 m/s; 33 to 63 km/h). The eastern wind was not communicated to the aircraft, but was 270°, varying from 20 to 40 knots (10 to 21 m/s; 37 to 74 km/h). The take-off started at 14:42:43 and the aircraft was airborne after having passed half the runway. Witnesses described that the aircraft after take-off climbed quickly, but then started falling, and then climbed quickly again. It then entered clouds west of the airport. During climb, the captain wanted to keep the flaps at 10°, contradictory to standard procedure that involved decreasing the flaps. At 14:43:09, a rattling sound was registered on the cockpit voice recorder (CVR). Thirty-five seconds later, sounds from unsynchronized propellers were registered. The first officer indicated that the flight was in difficulty. Eight seconds later, at 14:43:52, the CVR stopped recording. At 14:43:54, the control tower at Værøy registered a distress signal, that lasted four seconds, followed by a loud bang. The aircraft was then repeatedly called by radio. At 14:50, Bodø Air Traffic Control Center was contacted.

The Joint Rescue Coordination Centre of Northern Norway in Bodø dispatched two helicopters and two ships, but one helicopter and one ship had to return due to bad weather. At 16:45, parts of the aircraft were found 3.5 nautical miles (6.5 km) northwest of Værøy Airport. After the weather improved, one rescue ship, four fishing vessels and one Westland Sea King were used to find the wreck. On 13 April, twelve ships and two helicopters were being used, and several parts from the wreck were found. This allowed the search crew to use divers to search for the wreck. The aircraft was found on 15 April, 2,300 metres (7,500 ft) from the airport. Eighty percent of the wreck was found within an area of 300 by 400 m (980 by 1,310 ft) and at about 10 m (33 ft) depth. All occupants died immediately upon impact, and the bodies of the passengers and first officer were recovered; the captain's body was never found.

== Investigation ==
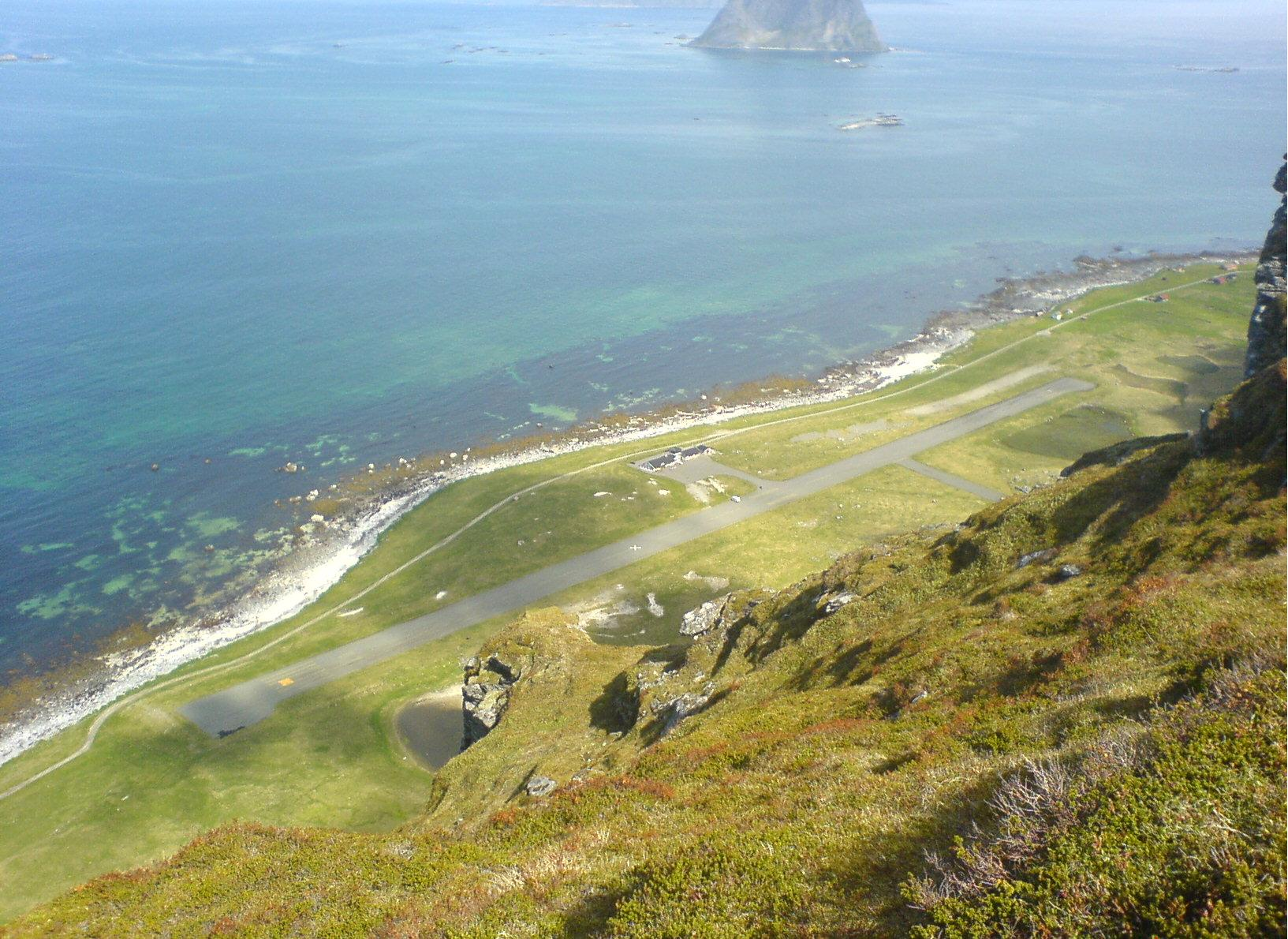
Værøy Airport was closed following the accident

The runway at Værøy Airport ran east-to-west and parallel to a mountain to the south that is about 500 m (1,600 ft) tall. Prior to construction, Widerøe had performed test flights in the area, and these had concluded with unacceptable wind conditions, particularly from the south over the mountain. From 31 October 1988, Widerøe introduced self-imposed restrictions on landing at Værøy. Aircraft were not allowed to land or take off if the wind came from 090°–240° (though south) if the wind speed exceeded 20 knots (10 m/s; 37 km/h), including gusts. Additional restrictions were introduced following an incident on 18 January 1989; these were again modified on 1 November 1989. Flight 839 took off within the permitted limits of these restrictions. However, Twin Otters were not to operate on the ground during winds that exceeded 50 knots (26 m/s; 93 km/h), and since the aircraft started taxiing following a report of wind speeds of 57 knots (29 m/s; 106 km/h), this was a breach of procedure. The wind also changed direction immediately after take-off.

The aircraft had not had any mechanical or technical errors or problems prior to take-off. The turbulence and wind shear caused a crack in either the tail rudder, the tailplane, or both. This was caused by strong winds alternating on both sides of the structure, due to shifting winds. These structural failures caused the aircraft to crash. Out of the 63 seconds from take-off to impact, the aircraft was under control for the first 55 seconds; only during the last 8 seconds did the crew lose control over the aircraft.

=== Cause ===
The Accident Investigation Board Norway stated in its report that the crew should not have landed with the amounts of wind that were reported, and that they definitively should not have taken off. However, since the wind came from the west, which by pilots was reported to cause fewer problems than from other directions, they may have decided to ignore the wind exceeding the permitted values. In particular, the Accident Investigation Board criticized the choice of taxiing in 57 knots (106 km/h), 7 knots (13 km/h) above the permitted wind speed for ground operation and far over the permitted levels for take-off from the airport. The board commented that although it was common to cancel flights to Værøy, no flights had been canceled after the plane had landed, instead being canceled prior to landing. The board commented that the flight being the last before Easter, it may have influenced the pilots' sense of duty towards getting the passengers to their destinations. This may have been aggravated by the very low regularity that was at Værøy. The board also commented that pilots did not trust the wind data they received, since they often experienced it to be incorrect and that the wind could vary considerably within the airport. While the plane was at the ground, it had been raining. Pilots at Værøy often experienced that weather was better between rain showers, and there were indications that the captain wanted to take-off before the next rain shower hit.

The Accident Investigation Board concluded:

The cause of the accident is that the plane during climb was subject to wind that exceeded the plane's construction criteria. This caused a crack in the tail rudder/tailplane causing the plane to become uncontrollable."

== Aftermath ==
=== New airport ===
Værøy Airport had opened on 1 July 1986 as part of the regional airport network in Northern Norway. Prior to this, Værøy and Røst had been served by helicopters using a heliport; that had replaced previous services with seaplanes. All services to the airport were suspended immediately after the incident. On 7 May, Widerøe stated that they would not use Værøy Airport, and that they would decline the concession to operate to Værøy if the island community did not receive a new airport. They commented that the restrictions caused by the wind had forced the airline to terminate up to half the departures. The chairman of the Widerøe's Pilots' Union, Cpt. Helge Høvik, stated the same day that the airline might have to lower the number of calls at some other regional airports, namely Mosjøen Airport, Kjærstad, Mo i Rana Airport, Røssvold, Sandnessjøen Airport, Stokka and Sandane Airport, Anda. Høvik stated that he felt that many of the airports were located in the wrong place, for instance at the bottom of valleys, on top of hills and between mountains. Widerøe stated that there was not a safety problem at any other regional airports.

The report from the Accident Investigation Board was highly critical to the Norwegian Civil Aviation Administration, stating that the airport should never have been built where it was and that it was "clearly unsuitable for regular traffic". It stated that the administration had overlooked comments from meteorologists and test flights in the area that had concluded that the wind conditions in the area were not suitable for an airport. The commission that wrote the report and conducted the investigation stated that the Civil Aviation Administration had not proceeded correctly while planning the airport—they had chosen Nordlandet early as a location and ignored negative comments. After the Norwegian Meteorological Institute had made a favorable report about the weather in the area, the administration had failed to conduct the necessary test flights to test the wind conditions, since this was not determined in the initial recommendation. The commission also commented that the safety division had been critical to the localization of the airport but had withdrawn their disputes following pressure from higher ranks in the administration. The commission also criticized the Civil Aviation Administration for not conducting investigations following the reports of low regularity and the incidents in 1988 and 1989.

No aircraft has ever taken off from Værøy Airport after the accident, except in June 1992, when a Cessna 172 brought 3 skydivers from Bodø Skydiving Club (Bodø Fallskjermklubb) to the island, accompanied by a Piper Cherokee 140 from Bodø Flyklubb and an experimental plane. The Cessna made 2 landings and take-offs and dropped the skydivers over the runway at approx. 8000 feet. The Piper and experimental craft made at least one landing and take-off each, during a public show held close to the airport. In 1992, the Norwegian Ministry of Transport and Communications decided to permanently close the airport, after it had been temporarily closed since the accident for two years. In 1995, Værøy Heliport was opened further south on the island, and Helikopter Service was awarded the public service obligation to operate the route. The helicopter service sometimes uses the closed airport as a reserve airport during bad weather.

=== Second investigation ===
In an article published in the newspaper Fremover (Narvik, Norway), in May 1994, the English aviation engineer Hugh Tyrer stated that the cause of the accident was probably due to fatigue in the end piece of the transfer mechanism to the elevator. The end piece was in such a state that it would have failed sooner or later in ordinary use. Following this discovery in the wreck, Widerøe had grounded all their Twin Otters and checked these pieces, but without finding any other defect parts. de Havilland Canada had also sent an alert to all operators of the Twin Otter to check the component and had canceled the contract with the subcontractor. On 800 operating Twin Otters, 86 end pieces were replaced shortly after the accident, although none had fatigue similar to that of LN-BNS. The commission's chair, Ragnar Rygnestad, stated that they had not considered the end piece to be part of the cause of the accident, and that they therefore had not stress-tested it or the elevator to see what forces were needed to cause a crack. Rygnestad stated that the board knew about the fatigue. He also said that he had no problems with the opening of a new inquiry. Widerøe stated that they trusted the report from the Accident Investigation Board.

Member of parliament, Inge Myrvoll, and president of the Norwegian Airline Pilots Association, Cpt. Peter Helland, both stated that the Accident Investigation Board should make a new inquiry about the accident. Cpt. Helland stated that the report's credibility was weakened due to the influence de Havilland Canada had during the process. On 10 June, the commission reopened the case, after having held meetings with Tyrer. The commission stated that there was disagreement as to if the tail rudder and tail plane or the end piece had cracked first, which would be crucial in determining the cause of the accident. Among the inquiries would be to re-investigate the tape of cockpit sound with new technology. The Accident Investigation Board used the National Aerospace Laboratory in the Netherlands to conduct tests on the end pieces. The report from the National Aerospace Laboratory was published on 23 March 1995, and supported the conclusion in the commission's original report. The journalist Oddvar Kristoffersen in Fremover won the SKUP Award for 1994 for his work related to uncovering the controversy. The pilots' union in Widerøe was initially critical of the report, but by July it stated that it supported the conclusion. In addition, Det Norske Veritas withdrew its critical comments concerning the commission. With this, all officially involved parties supported the report.

== In popular culture ==
The crash was featured in season 26, episode 2 of the Canadian documentary series Mayday, also known as Air Crash Investigation, titled "Norwegian Nightmare".
