= Værøy Airport =

Former Airport in Værøy, Norway

Værøy Airport Værøy lufthavn
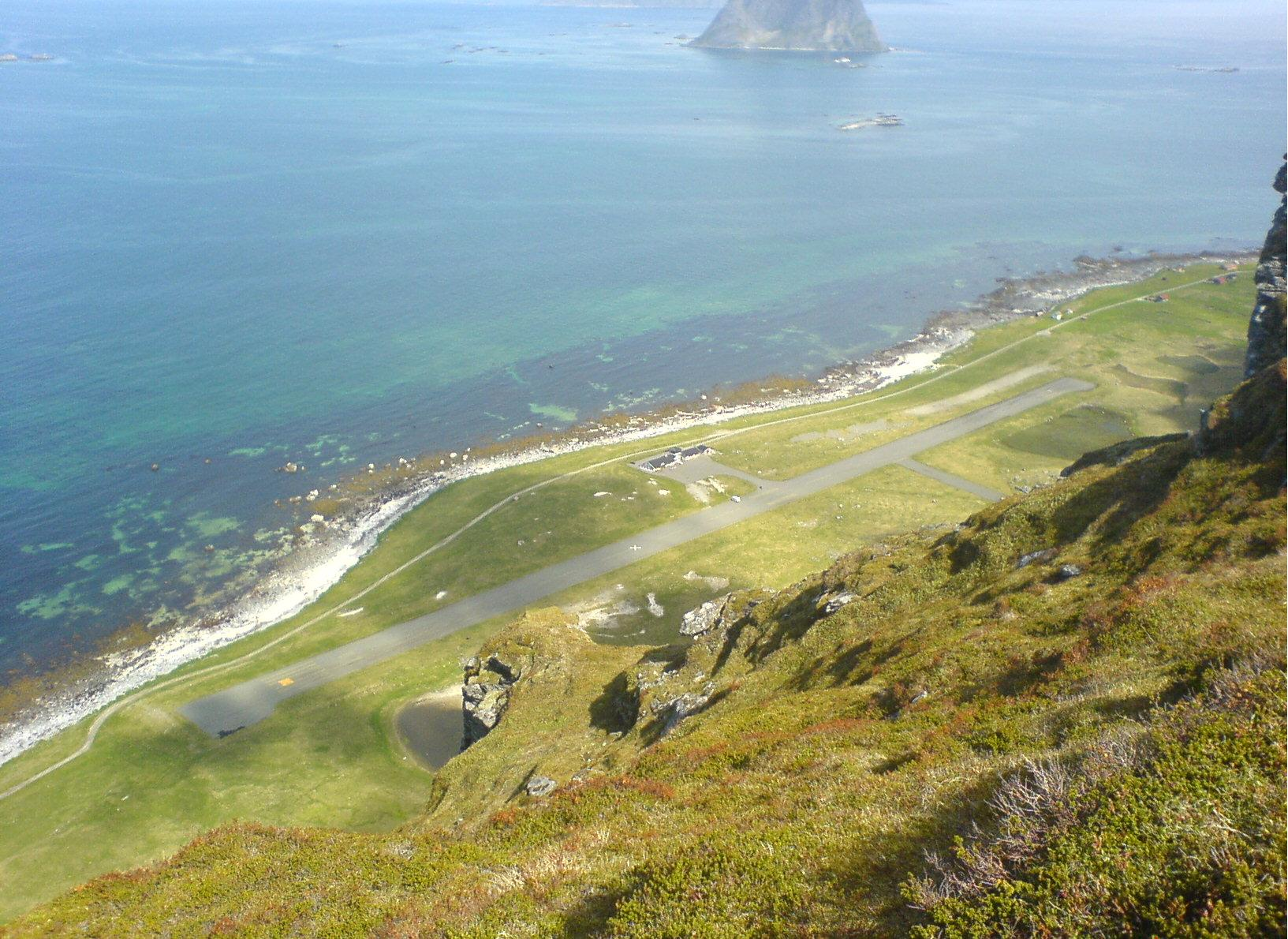
- IATA: VRY; ICAO: ENVY

Summary
- Airport type: Defunct
- Owner/Operator: Municipality of Værøy
- Serves: Værøy, Norway
- Location: Nordland, Værøya
- Opened: 1986
- Closed: 1990
- Elevation AMSL: 11 m (36 ft)
- Coordinates: 67°41′18″N 012°40′54″E

Map
- Location within Norway

Runways
Direction	Length		Surface
Direction	m	ft	Surface
07/25	800	2,625	Asphalt

Værøy Airport (Norwegian: Værøy lufthavn; IATA: VRY, ICAO: ENVY) was a regional airport located just southwest of the village of Nordland on the island of Værøya in Værøy Municipality in Nordland county, Norway. Operated between 1986 and 1990, it had an 800-by-30-meter (2,625 by 98 ft) asphalt runway aligned 07–25. The airport was owned and operated by the Værøy Municipality. It was served by Widerøe, who operated de Havilland Canada DHC-6 Twin Otter aircraft to the town of Bodø and the nearby island of Røstlandet. After a fatal accident in 1990, the airport was shut down.

Widerøe commenced seaplane operations to Værøy from 1965; five years later the first helicopter services were introduced. Planning of an airport started in the late 1960s, but unfavorable weather conditions prolonged finding a suitable location. The decision to build the airport was taken in 1984, construction began the following year and the airport opened on 1 June 1986. The fatal Widerøe Flight 839 accident took place on 12 April 1990, in which heavy wind caused structural failure of a Twin Otter. The airport has been closed since; helicopter services commenced in 1993 and Værøy Heliport opened in 1997.

== History ==
=== Early aviation ===
The first aircraft to land in Værøy was a Noorduyn Norseman of the Royal Norwegian Air Force in 1948. Services to Værøy started in 1965, when Widerøe commenced sea plane services to the island using de Havilland Canada DHC-3 Otters and Norseman aircraft. The routes were operated two to three times per week as a charter service, with subsidies from the municipalities of Værøy and Røst. At Værøy the airline parked the aircraft in Sørlandsvågen and rowed passengers to and from land with a rowboat. Ragnar Johansen's Cessna was a frequent operator to Værøy for charter services.

Helikopter Service flew between Bodø Airport to Værøy and Røst—the island community further out from Værøy—with three weekly services from 1973. The helicopters doubled as serving for search and rescue duty; in case they were needed for the latter flights to Værøy and Røst were cancelled. The regional airports in Lofoten and Vesterålen opened in 1972, with the Værøy and Røst service being taken over by Widerøe on 1 September 1973. As they did not want to operate helicopters, they subcontracted the operations to Helilift. The service operated twice per day on weekdays and once per day in the weekends, using two sixteen-seat Sikorsky S-58Ts. Subsidies of 1.9 million Norwegian krone (NOK) was granted for the route in 1973, and the service transported 5,359 passengers (from both Røst and Værøy). At Værøy the helicopters landed at Hanna Bakken-jordet in Sørland.

One of the helicopters was bought by Widerøe in December 1976 and the operations were subcontracted to Offshore Helicopters. The second Sikorsky was bought from Helilift in March 1978 and also operated by Offshore Helicopters. Helikopter Service merged with Offshore Helicopters in 1980, and the new Helikopter Service took over the route. They introduced an eleven-seat Bell 212 helicopters from 1 January 1982 because of the high maintenance costs of the S-58Ts. In 1982 the service to both islands handled 7,145 passengers and three tonnes of post and cargo, and made 744 landings. It received subsidies for NOK 4 million.

=== Establishment ===
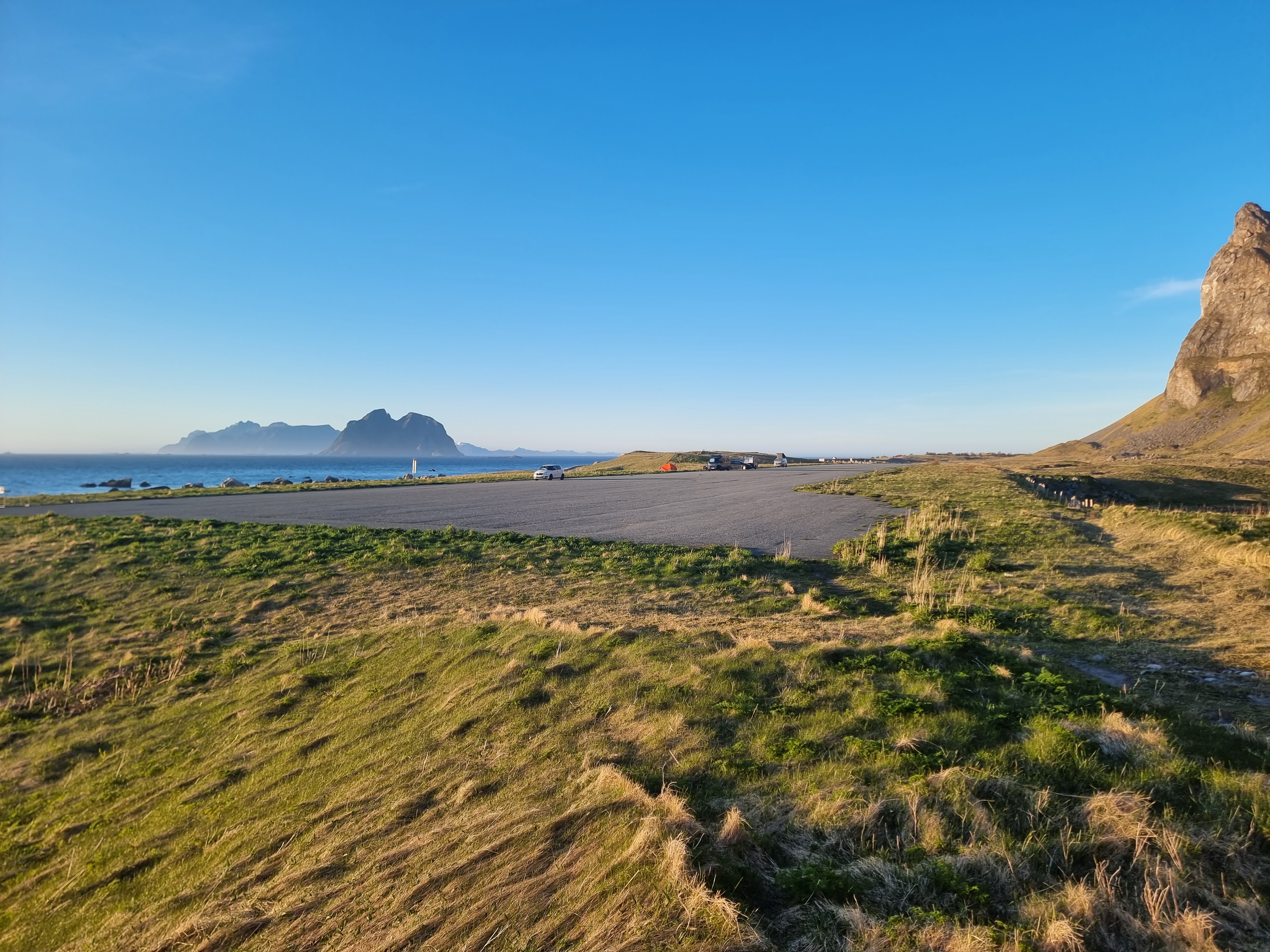
Contemporary view of the runway, looking east

The first proposals for an airport on Værøya were launched by the government in the late 1960s. A 1968 meteorological report concluded that the island was highly susceptible for strong winds, dominantly from the west, which could cause problems for air traffic. Three locations were considered: Kvalnes, Røssnesvågen og Nordlandet. The Norwegian Meteorological Institute concluded in 1973 that Nordlandet was the most suitable location in terms of weather, but test flights showed otherwise. Nordlandet was the cheapest alternative. Estimates showed that the regularity at an airport would be significantly lower than at the existing heliport. This caused local politicians to wish to keep the existing service, but pressure from Røst caused Værøy politicians to support an airport. After initial protests against Nordlandet as a site, Mayor Asmund Berg accepted the location on 3 May 1984. There had not been conducted sufficient test flights to establish the wind conditions above the airport caused by Teisthammeren, a mountain next to the airport. Widerøe was opposed to the location of the airport.

Planning of the airport ran parallel with five other regional airports: Fagernes Airport, Leirin; Førde Airport, Bringeland; Mosjøen Airport, Kjærstad; Rørvik Airport, Ryum and Røst Airport. Construction was approved by the Parliament of Norway on 10 April 1984 and construction began in 1985. The municipality was granted concession to operate the airport on 22 August 1985. Værøy and Røst Airports were opened on 1 June 1986, after 15 million kr had been spent on constructing Værøy Airport.

=== Operational history ===
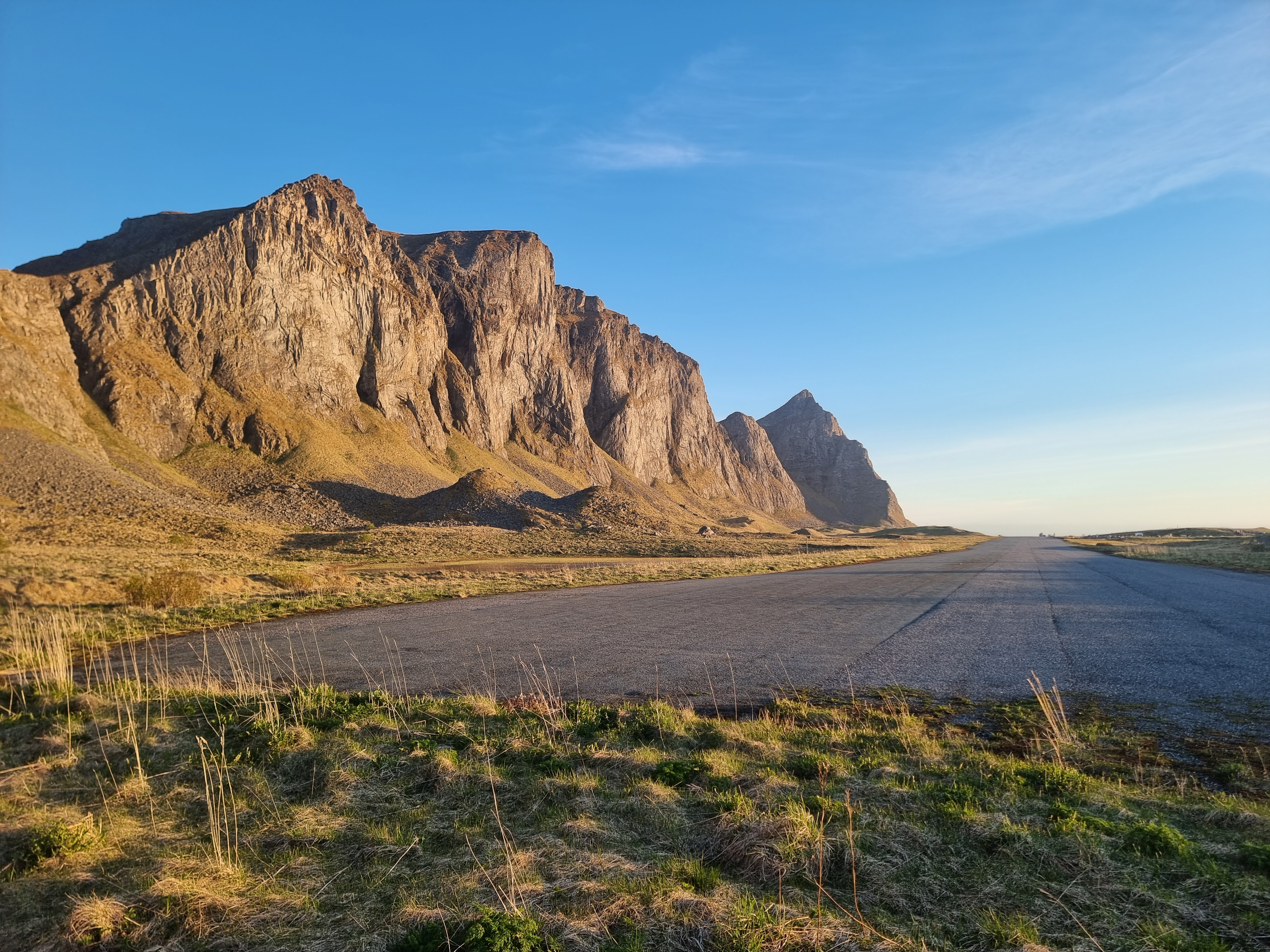
The runway, looking west, showing the mountains just south of the runway

Værøy Airport was plagued by bad wind conditions and low regularity. The airport had the highest number of cancellations in the country, with 31 of 609 flights canceled in the first eleven months of operation. During some periods, regularity was as low as 50%. The navigational aids were moved in 1989 to increase safety, more runway lights were installed and an anemometer was installed on the mountain, costing 1 million kr. Widerøe introduced self-imposed restrictions on landing at Værøy from 31 October 1988. Aircraft were not allowed to land or take off if the wind came from 090°–240° (through south) if the wind speed exceeded 20 knots (10 m/s; 37 km/h; 23 mph), including gusts. Additional restriction were introduced following an incident on 18 January 1989. These were again modified on 1 November 1989.

On 12 April 1990, Widerøe Flight 839 crashed one minute after take-off, killing all five on board. The cause of the accident was the turbulence and high wind speeds around the airport. The airport was immediately closed after the incident; no public flights have taken off from the airport after Flight 839. Private flights still use the airport on occasion. The Ministry of Transport and Communications decided on 17 January 1992 to permanently close the airport, after it had been temporarily closed since the accident. This made Værøy Airport the civilian airport in Europe to have operated the shortest time. Helicopter Service resumed helicopter flights on 1 January 1993. Construction of a new heliport started in 1996 and Værøy Heliport opened on 15 February 1997. The old airport was in 2000 bought by a private individual who converted the terminal building into a private dwelling and used the control tower for a small-scale chocolate factory. The chocolate factory burned down on 8 October 2015, and the owner announced that the factory would be permanently moved to another location.

== Facilities ==
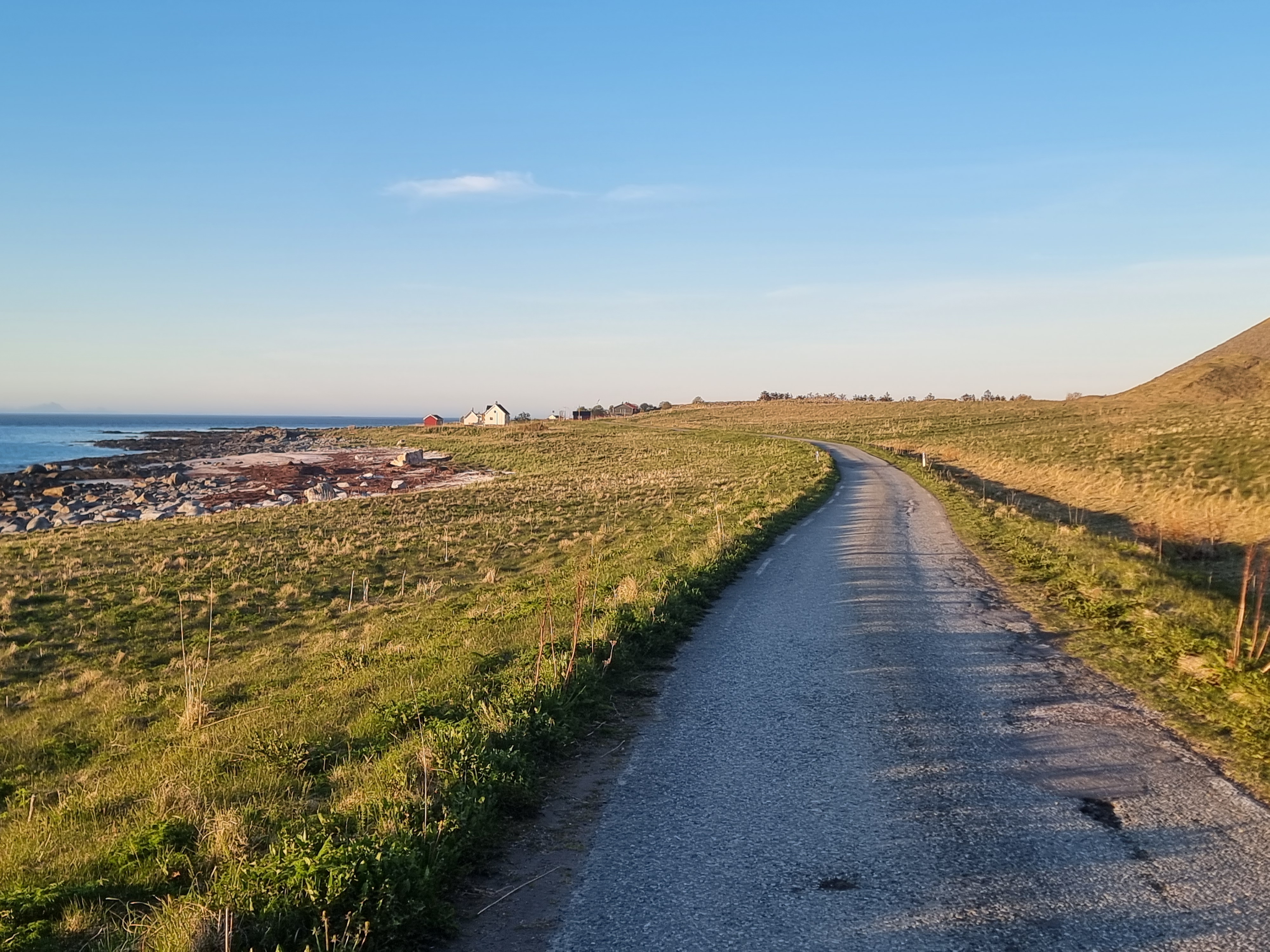
Nordlandsveien, the road to the airport

The airport is located at Nordland on the north side of the island of Værøya. It is located on level section of land; just south of the runway is the 465-meter (1,526 ft) tall mountain Teisthammeren. The asphalt runway measured 800 by 30 meters (2,625 by 98 ft) and was aligned 07–25. The terminal building had a café and was connected to the rest of the island with a dirt road.

== Airlines and destinations ==
On present days, there is no scheduled flights to/from the airport. But the airport was served by Widerøe using de Havilland Canada DHC-6 Twin Otter in the past. The airline operated two trips Bodø–Røst–Værøy–Bodø on weekdays and one round trip during the weekend. In addition, there were two weekly trips that connected Værøy to Leknes Airport before returning to Bodø. The service was subsidized by the Ministry of Transport and Communications.

== Accidents and incidents ==
On 18 January 1989, a Widerøe Twin Otter operating as Flight 836 became uncontrollable due to turbulence during final approach to Værøy. Control was regained when there was 80 meters (260 ft) height above the sea. This incident caused the airport to be temporarily closed.

On 12 April 1990, Widerøe Flight 839 crashed one minute after take-off, killing all five on board. The accident was caused by high wind speeds that exceeded the plane's structural tolerance, causing the tail rudder and vertical stabilizer to crack, and the plane to crash in the sea after eight seconds.
