= FlyViking =

Norwegian airline based in Lyngseidet

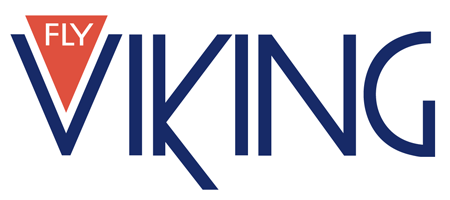
IATA	ICAO	Call sign
VF	FVK	BALDER
- Founded: 2016
- Commenced operations: 27 March 2017
- Ceased operations: 12 January 2018
- Hubs: Tromsø-Langnes
- Fleet size: 3
- Destinations: 11
- Parent company: Viking Air Norway AS
- Headquarters: Lyngseidet, Troms, Norway
- Key people: Ola Olsen (chairman), Heine Richardsen (CEO), Ola O.K Giæver (founder)
- Website: flyviking.no

FlyViking AS was a short-lived, Norwegian regional airline with head office in Lyngseidet, Troms and based in Tromsø. FlyViking operated regional flights in the northern parts of Norway.

== History ==
FlyViking was founded in 1989 as Lofotfly. It was renamed Fly Taxi Nord in 2000 and operated Piper PA-31 aircraft, on both cargo- and passenger air charter flights. In November 2015, Ola O.K Giæver Jr., a former employee of Norwegian airline Widerøe, bought the airline and later renamed it FlyViking.

In 2016 FlyViking lost the tender competition on a five-year contract by the Norwegian Ministry of Transport and Communications to operate 13 of Norway's Public Service Obligation routes starting in April 2017. FlyViking and Danish Air Transport lost the tender round, while Widerøe won all of the 13 PSO routes. On February 14, 2017, FlyViking was awarded a new air operator's certificate (AOC) from the Civil Aviation Authority of Norway, the new AOC allowing FlyViking to transport more than 20 passengers on each flight. The airline operated its first scheduled service on 27 March 2017 from Tromsø to Hammerfest and Bodø using a Bombardier Dash 8-100.

On 29 December 2017, FlyViking announced it would cease all operations on 12 January 2018 due to its financial situation. All northern routes were closed that day. While the route between Ørland and Oslo are operated by Danish Air Transport/DOT LT for a new virtual airline created by parent firm Viking Air Norway AS. All flights out of Tromsø have been taken over by its competitor, Widerøe.

== Destinations ==
The airline operated to the following destinations within Norway:

City	Airport	Notes	Ref
Alta	Alta Airport		
Bodø	Bodø Airport		
Hammerfest	Hammerfest Airport		
Harstad/Narvik	Harstad/Narvik Airport, Evenes		
Kirkenes	Kirkenes Airport		
Oslo	Oslo Airport, Gardermoen		
Stokmarknes	Stokmarknes Airport		
Tromsø	Tromsø Airport	Main base	
Trondheim	Trondheim Airport, Værnes		
Vadsø	Vadsø Airport		
Ørland	Ørland Airport	Base	

== Fleet ==
As of January 2018 FlyViking operates the following aircraft:

FlyViking fleet
Aircraft	In Service	Orders	Passengers	Notes
Dash 8-100 & Q100	3	1	39	4th aircraft was never delivered
Total	3	1		
