= Air Leap =

Swedish/Norwegian virtual airline

Air Leap (Sweden)
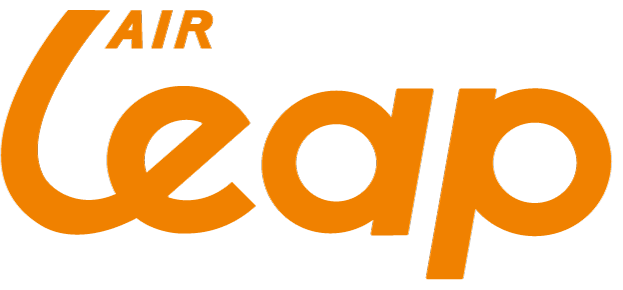
IATA	ICAO	Call sign
FL	LPA	LEAP
- Founded: 2018
- Commenced operations: 2018
- Ceased operations: 24 January 2022
- Hubs: Stockholm-Arlanda; Stockholm-Bromma
- Focus cities: Oslo; Visby
- Fleet size: 6
- Destinations: 13
- Headquarters: Stockholm
- Key people: Jon Melkersson (CEO)
- Website: www.airleap.se

Air Leap (Norway) (Virtual airline)
- Founded: 2018 (as Next Move)
- Headquarters: Oslo
- Key people: Heine Richardsen (CEO)
- Website: www.airleap.no

Air Leap was the trading name of the Norwegian Virtual airline Air Leap AS and the Swedish airline Air Leap Aviation AB.

== History ==
Air Leap was founded by the same owners as the airline FlyViking. After FlyViking ceased operations in January 2018, the virtual airline Next Move was founded in March 2018 to continue operating the Ørland - Oslo Gardermoen route. Next Move was renamed Air Leap after the company bought parts of the bankrupt Swedish airline Nextjet. The parts of Nextjet became the Swedish Air Leap, but lacked an Air operator's certificate (AOC) to operate the Swedish routes, which is why all flights in the beginning were operated by Denmark's Danish Air Transport (DAT), the Estonian NyxAir and the Dutch AIS Airlines, among others.

On 11 June 2018 flights were resumed in Sweden. On 19 October 2018, the Swedish Transport Agency awarded Air Leap Air Operator Certificate (AOC) and registered the company as the official operator of three Saab 340Bs. The first flight under new AOC took place on 21 October 2018 from Stockholm-Arlanda to Mariehamn.

On 24 January 2022, the company suspended operations and filed for reorganization, citing financial issues as a result of a lack of government aid from the COVID-19 pandemic.

== Destinations ==
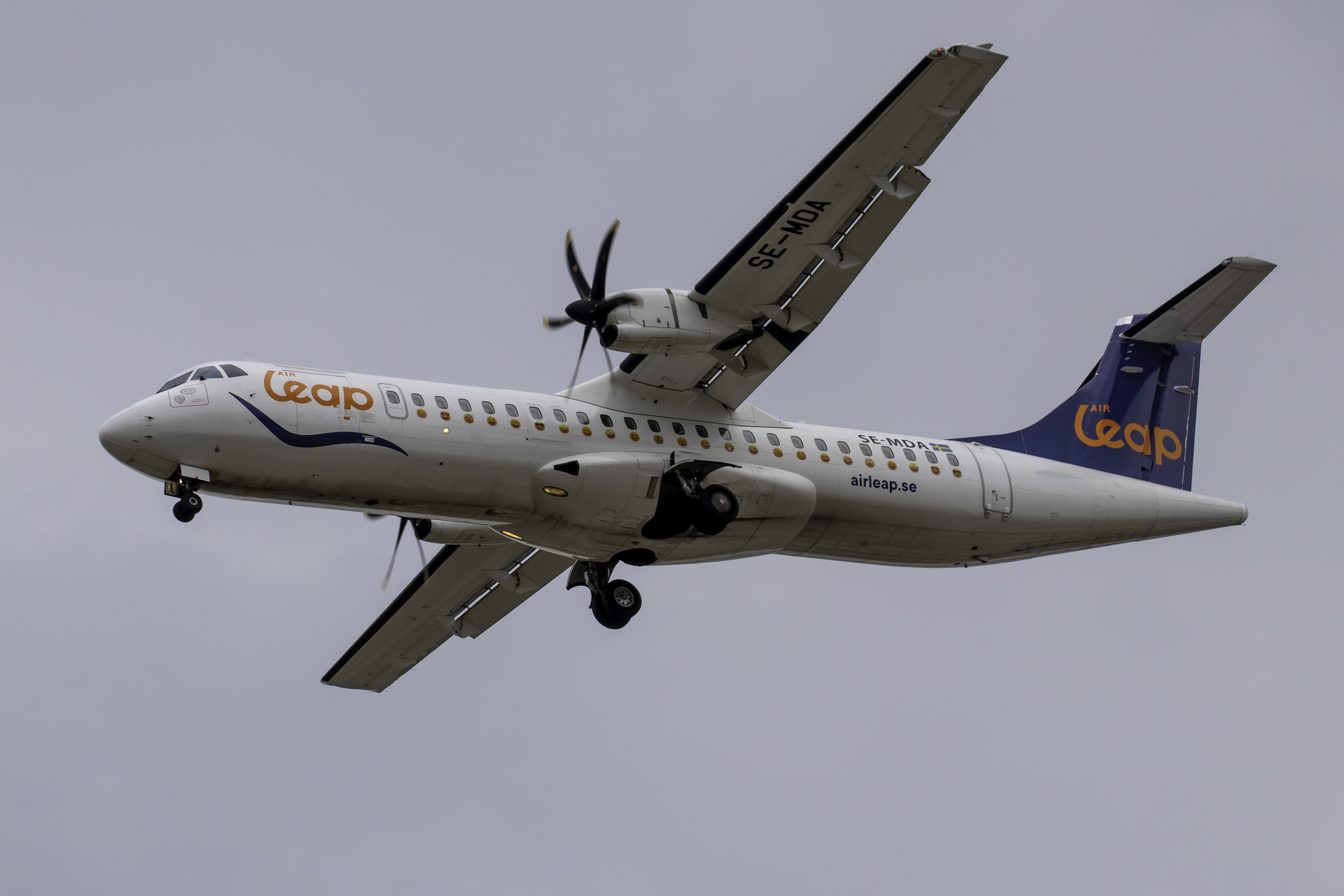
Air Leap ATR 72-500

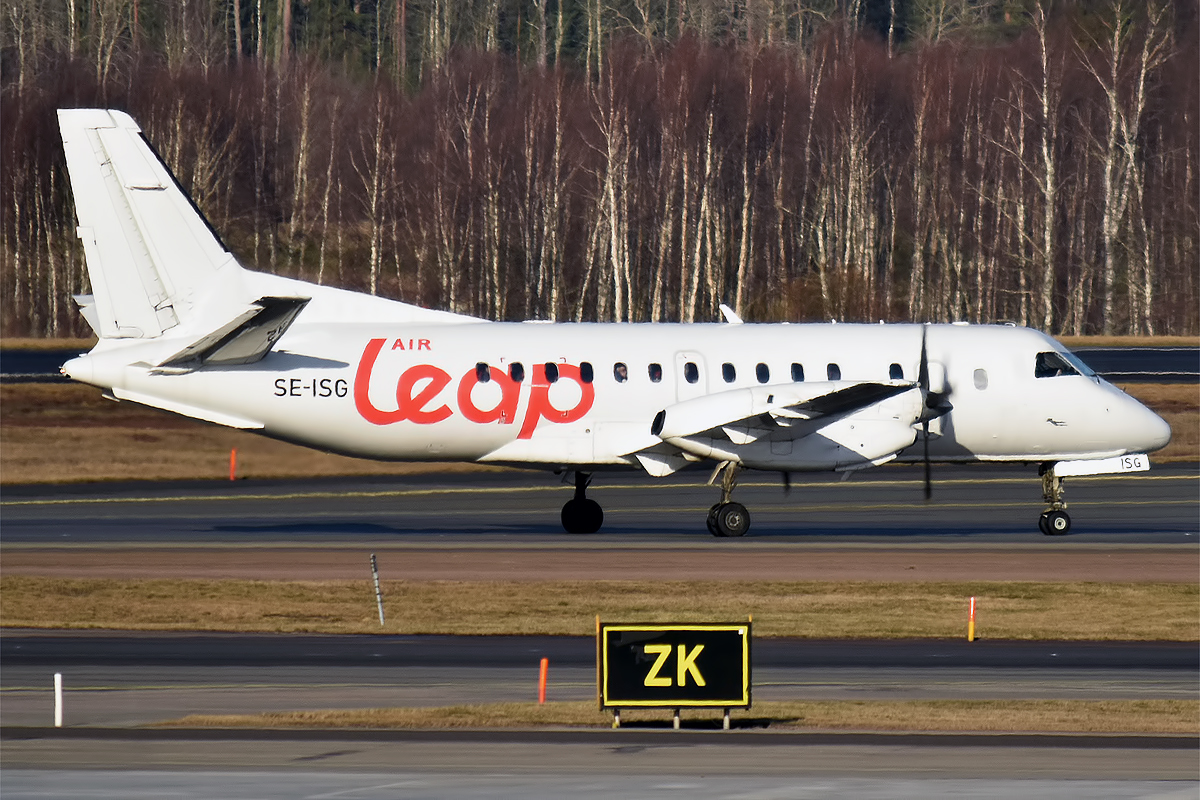
Air Leap Saab 340B

This is a list of destinations operated by Air Leap:

Country	City	Airport	Notes	Refs
Åland	Mariehamn	Mariehamn Airport		
Finland	Turku	Turku Airport		
Norway	Oslo	Oslo Airport, Gardermoen		
Norway	Ørland	Ørland Airport		
Norway	Røros	Røros Airport		
Sweden	Ängelholm	Ängelholm–Helsingborg Airport	Terminated	
Sweden	Gothenburg	Göteborg Landvetter Airport	Terminated	
Sweden	Halmstad	Halmstad Airport		
Sweden	Jönköping	Jönköping Airport	Terminated	
Sweden	Karlstad	Karlstad Airport	Terminated	
Sweden	Malmö	Malmö Airport	Terminated	
Sweden	Örnsköldsvik	Örnsköldsvik Airport		
Sweden	Ronneby	Ronneby Airport	Terminated	
Sweden	Stockholm	Stockholm Arlanda Airport	Base	
Sweden	Stockholm	Stockholm Bromma Airport	Base; Terminated	
Sweden	Sundsvall	Sundsvall–Timrå Airport	Terminated	
Sweden	Visby	Visby Airport	Base	

== Fleet ==
As of January 2022, prior to the suspension of all operations, the Air Leap fleet consists of the following aircraft:

Air Leap (Sweden) fleet
Aircraft	In service	Orders	Passengers	Notes
ATR72-500	1	—	72	
Saab 340B	4	—	33-34	
Total	5	—		
