= Coast Air =

Norwegian airline (1988–2008)

IATA	ICAO	Call sign
BX	CST	COAST CENTER
- Founded: 1988
- Ceased operations: 2008
- Hubs: Haugesund Airport, Karmøy
- Fleet size: 9
- Destinations: 11
- Parent company: TS Industri Invest
- Headquarters: Karmøy, Norway
- Key people: Trygve Seglem (owner)
- Website: en.coastair.no

Coast Air AS was a regional airline based at Haugesund Airport, Karmøy in Norway. It was Norway's fourth largest airline and operated domestic services within Norway, in addition to international services. Routes were concentrated along the West Coast, as well as some public service obligation contracts in Southern Norway. The company had a fleet of de Havilland Canada Twin Otter aircraft, later replaced with Jetstream 31s and ATR 42s.

The company was founded on the remains of Coast Aero Center, which operated from 1975 to 1988. Coast Air started flying de Havilland Canada Twin Otter aircraft from Haugesund to Oslo Airport, Fornebu and Bergen Airport, Flesland. In 1990, service from Fagernes Airport, Leirin was also introduced, a route that lasted until 1997. Following the deregulation of aviation in Norway in 1994, Coast Air started several regional routes, replacing its fleet with Jetstream 31 aircraft. From 2000, Coast Air also served Florø Airport on public service obligation with the Ministry of Transport, using ATR 42 aircraft. In 2003, it lost the Florø contract, but regained the Fagernes route. From 1999, Coast Air started competing direct with the larger airlines on main routes, and introduced new regional and international services. From then on, the company continuously lost money. From 2004, it wet-leased aircraft to Vildanden, but the contract was canceled the following year. Following attempts to start new international route, Coast Air filed for bankruptcy in 2008.

== History ==
=== Coast Aero Center ===
Coast Aero Center started operations in 1975 from Haugesund Airport. The company was a local mechanical and small-plane operator until 1984, when it started to apply for concessions to perform regional airline services in Norway. The company was owned and run by Asbjørn Utne.

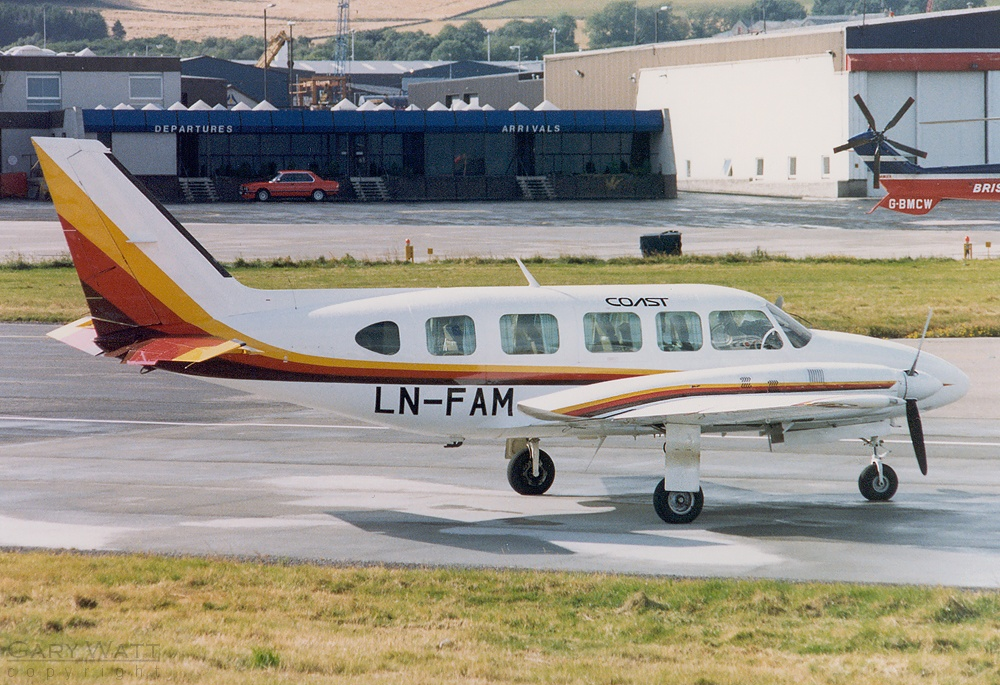
Coast Aero Center Piper PA-31 Navajo at Aberdeen Airport in 1986

Following the 1984 decision by Scandinavian Airlines System to discontinue their route from Haugesund to Aberdeen in the United Kingdom, Coast Aero Center applied for the concession. They would use a 15-seat Embraer Bandeirante that would be bought used for NOK 7.5 million. Coast Aero Center started their service on 20 August 1986, but it turned out to be unprofitable, and was terminated in April 1987.

In October 1984, Coast Aero Center, along with Norving and Fonnafly, applied for concession for the routes from Stord Airport, Sørstokken to Oslo, Bergen, and Stavanger. Coast Air was successful at receiving the concession, and service started on 12 August 1986 with a ten-seater Beechcraft Super King 200. In August, the company also received concession to fly from Stord via Skien Airport, Geiteryggen to Oslo. By March 1987, traffic had increased so much that the company instead put a larger, 20-seater Twin Otter aircraft into service. Additional concessions to fly to Haugesund were also granted the same year, as were direct services to Oslo, making the stops in Skien unnecessary.

In 1985, the company joined the joint venture Commuter Service, along with the other regional airlines Mørefly, based in Ålesund, Trønderfly, based in Trondheim, and Norsk Flytjeneste, based in Sandefjord. The goal was to coordinate the services, and grow through newer, smaller routes. On 20 June 1986, Coast Aero Center was awarded the concession for flying from Stavanger to Geilo Airport, Dagali until 1991. The airline put into service a Beechcraft Super King 200. The ridership from Geilo turned out to be too low, and both Coast Aero Center and Norving terminated their routes. In 1986, the revenue was NOK 14 million and the company had 24 employees. That year, they chose to connect to the PNR/Smart booking system. In 1988, the company also bid for operating parts of the Norwegian Air Ambulance.

The company was thrown into financial distress on 7 February 1988, when Den norske Creditbank (DnC) announced that they would not issue more credit. At the time the company had nine daily routes and 35 employees. All services were immediately suspended. It had a debt of NOK 23 million, of which DnC demanded NOK 13 million paid by 10 February; the bank later gave the company three weeks to find the capital. On 17 February, a proposal for refinancing was made, where the hangars were sold to the local municipalities, who would also make a guarantee for NOK 2 million. DnC would delete part of the debt, and additional capital would be granted from Kosmos-owned Norsk Air. This was not sufficient, and on 29 April Coast Aero Center filed for bankruptcy. Asbjørn Utne had to file for personal bankruptcy.

=== Reestablishment ===
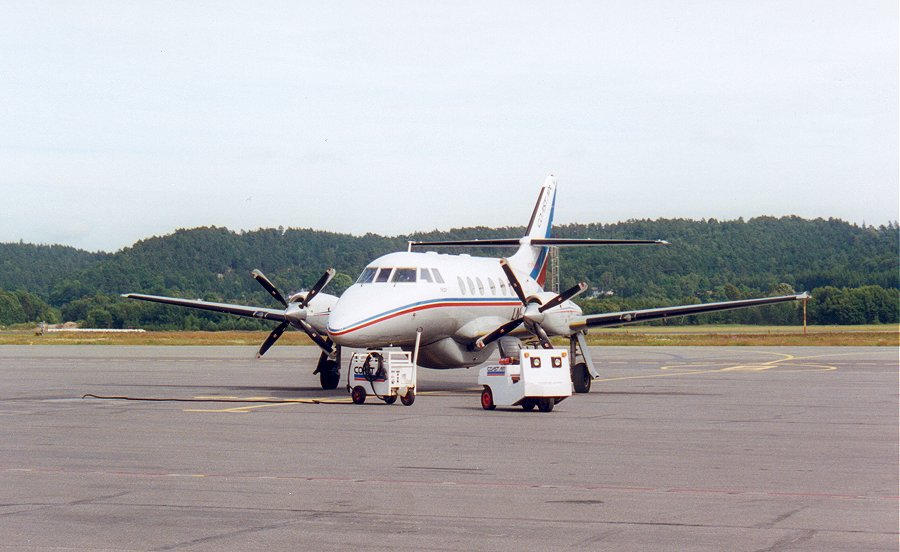
Jetstream 31 at Kristiansand Airport, Kjevik in 1999

Following the bankruptcy, the estate was purchased by Coast Air. In 1989, the new company received a one-year concession to operate from Haugesund to Bergen and Stavanger, and from Geilo to Oslo and Stavanger. The company used de Havilland Canada Twin Otter aircraft. The following year, Coast Air also received the concession for operating the subsidized routes to the newly opened Fagernes Airport, Leirin. Six companies bid for the route, but only Coast Air and Widerøe were deemed qualified; Coast Air could operate for NOK 2 million annually less than Widerøe, and therefore received the concession. Operation started on 3 September 1990, with the concession valid until 24 October 1993. In 1991, Coast Air flew 5,000 passengers to and from Fagernes Airport. With a NOK 6.8 million subsidy, it was the most expensive subsidized route per passenger in the country. This was largely due to a 20% cabin load. In August 1991, Coast Air received concession until 1993 for the route Haugesund–Bergen, but the Haugesund–Stavanger route was canceled. In March 1992, Coast Air was denied a concession to operate from Stord to Stavanger; instead, the concession was granted to Air Stord. Coast Air started flying from Skien Airport in 1993, with a route to Bergen.

On 1 April 1994, the Norwegian airline market was deregulated. Airlines no longer needed to apply for concession from the government, but could fly any route they wanted to. For the first time, several airlines could establish themselves on the same route. The exception was the state-subsidized regional routes, that would become subject to public service obligations (PSO) from 1 April 1997. Following the deregulation, Coast Air introduced a route from Bergen to Kristiansand Airport, Kjevik with a Jetstream 31. From 1995, the airline was forced to pay much higher fees to the Norwegian Civil Aviation Administration, following the decision that all commercial plans, also those under 5.7 tonnes (5.6 long tons; 6.3 short tons), should pay flight fees. In October, Coast Air was close to buying Air Stord, but the company was instead sold to Aker. In 1995, two new Jetstream 31 aircraft were delivered, and the Twin Otter aircraft were transferred to the new route between Stord and Stavanger. A third Jetstream was delivered the following year, and the Twin Otter was taken out of service.

=== Public service obligations ===
The state-subsidized regional airline contracts were made subject to PSO in 1996. In a trial tender for the Fagernes route. Five domestic airlines bid, and Teddy Air won. Their bid was NOK 23.7 million, 15% lower than the former subsidy for Coast Air. In the main tender, the Ministry of Transport and Communications issued seven packages, of which Coast Air chose to bid for two—to the airports in Namdal and Helgeland, and to Andøya Airport, Andenes. All seven packages were won by the incumbent operator Widerøe. The new tenders took effect on 1 April 1997, and lasted three years.

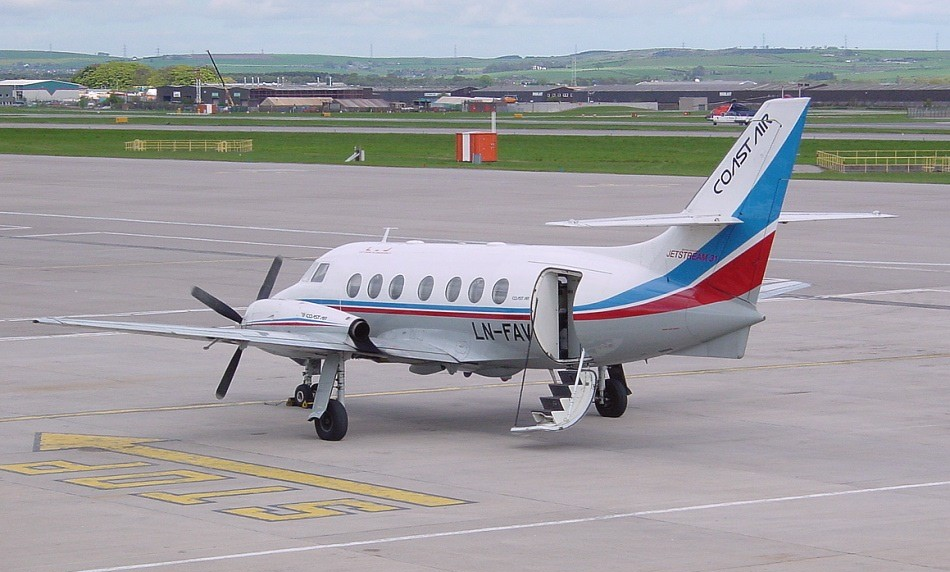
Jetstream 31 in 2001

Coast Air's first PSO contract was awarded in September 1999, on the route from Florø Airport to Oslo and Bergen. This required that the company put into service two 46-seat ATR 42–300 aircraft. It also caused a problem for Widerøe, who had their technical base for Western Norway at Florø. The company received NOK 51 million annually, from 1 April 2000 to 31 March 2003; this resulted in there no longer being in intermediate stops from Florø to Bergen and Oslo. Color Air flew four or five daily trips to both Bergen and Oslo. The bid was about NOK 100 million lower than from Widerøe. Saga Petroleum, who used Florø Airport as a helicopter base to fly their workers to offshore oil platforms, was critical to the use of the ATR 42 aircraft; while they were suitable for Florø, that has a 1,200 m (3,900 ft) runway, the planes would not be able to land at other airports in Sogn og Fjordane. In cases of bad weather, the oil company would now have to bus their passengers from Bergen and Ålesund, instead of much closer airports, such as Førde Airport, Bringeland. In February 2000, Coast Air was hit by a strike regarding which of the pilots were to be recertified to fly the larger ATR 42 aircraft. The pilots insisted that seniority be used for selection, while management wanted to be able to choose themselves. Management also wanted to secure that all personnel that were recertified signed a three-year working contract with the company. Not until mid-March was the strike settled, after a compromise had been reached.

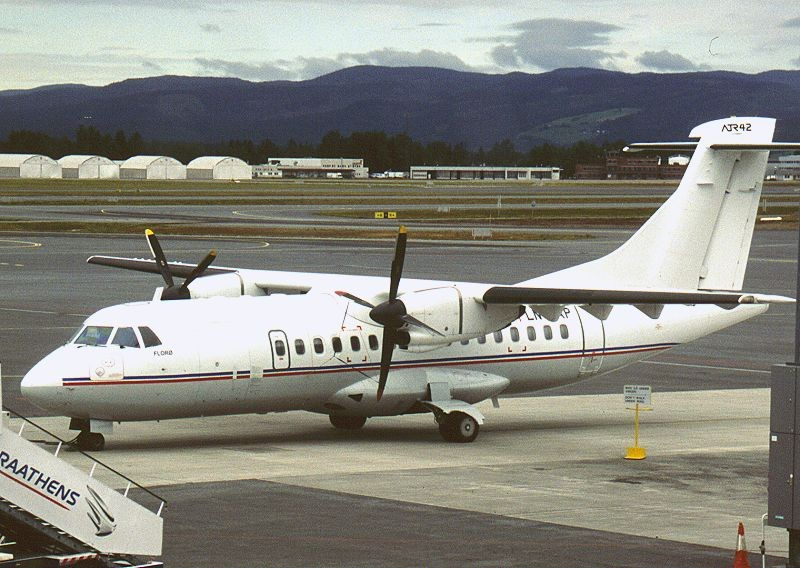
Coast Air ATR-42 at Oslo Airport, Gardermoen in 2000

In January 2000, Braathens decided that it would terminate its service from Oslo to Røros Airport, as well as reducing the number of flights between Haugesund and Bergen. Coast Air therefore announced it would increase the number of departures between Haugesund and Bergen, and at the same time was willing to fly to Røros if a state subsidy was granted. The contract to Røros was however won by Danish Air Transport (DAT), who bid NOK 500,000 per month, NOK 64,000 less than Coast Air.

The demand for air travel dropped in 2001, and only 85,000 passengers flew with Coast Air to Florø, instead of the estimated 100,000, making the entire operation a loss for the company. Despite this, Coast Air leased a third ATR 42 aircraft in February 2002. But cancellations continued to rise, and in November the company's subsidies from the ministry were reduced due to lack of performance. In December 2001, Guard Air was forced to terminate all operations, and a new PSO tender was made for the services to Fagernes. Along with Arctic Air, Widerøe and DAT, Coast Air made a bid. The contract was won by Arctic Air. With the next round of PSO contracts, valid from 1 April 2003 through 31 March 2006, Coast Air lost the Florø contract to DAT, but succeeded at winning the contract for Fagernes for NOK 10 million per year.

Following the 2005 announcement of the PSO contracts from 1 April 2006 to 31 March 2009, Coast Air was awarded three contracts. In addition to retaining the Fagernes route, it also received the concession for the Røros and Andenes routes. The three routes gave NOK 35 million in annual subsidies. Røros and Andenes would be served by ATR 42-aircraft, while Jetstreams would be used to Fagernes. From 30 January 2007, the company also started flying from Røros to Trondheim twice a week. From 1 April 2007, Coast Air canceled their flights to Andenes. Since the operations were separated from the rest of the network, it was not possible to fly profitably. Widerøe subsequently took over the route. During July 2007, Coast Air introduced the smaller Jetstream aircraft on the routes to Røros.

=== Financial problems ===
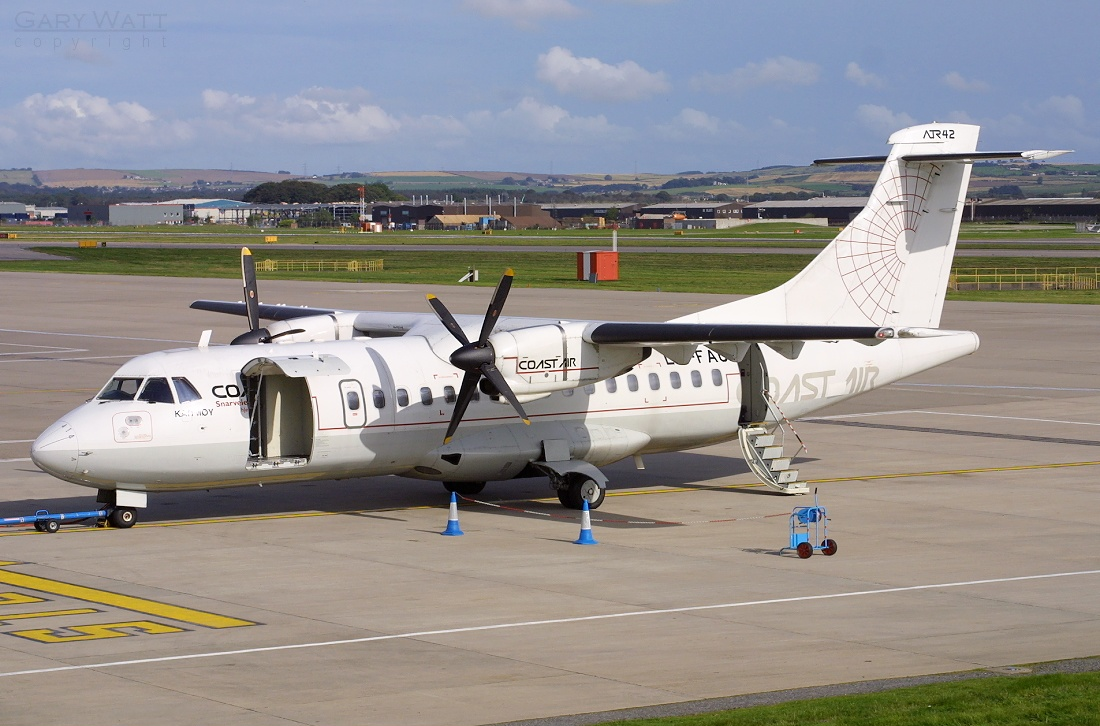
ATR-42 at Aberdeen Airport in 2002

Following the loss of the Fagernes route, Coast Air relocated its services to the Bergen–Skien and the Haugesund–Aberdeen route in 1997. After Air Stord filed for bankruptcy in February 1999, Coast Air and Teddy Air both started flights from the airport to Oslo. Coast Air also expanded Kristiansand as a hub, with additional routes to Stavanger, Haugesund and Gothenburg in Sweden. In January 2000, the company announced that it was not making any money on the Kristiansand routes, and immediately terminated all four services. Coast air carried 50,000 passengers in 1999.

After having made small profits ten years in a row until 1998, Coast Air had a loss of NOK 18.6 million and a revenue of NOK 40.5 million in 1999. To increase liquidity, the company sold two of its four Jetstream 31 aircraft. The establishment in the PSO market was expensive for Coast Air, and the airline lost NOK 9.7 million in 2000. To counteract, the company's owners chose to perform a private placement of NOK 7.5 million. By April 2001, the liquidity problems in Coast Air were so severe that the employees threatened to file for bankruptcy. Coast Air chose to terminate the Haugesund–Aberdeen route, and replace it with a service between Bergen and Aberdeen. With the Scandinavian Airlines System take-over of Braathens in May, Coast Air became the largest airline in the country not owned by the SAS Group. In 2003, the company chose to reintroduce the route between Stavanger and Geilo. Following Ryanair's establishment of a route from Haugesund to London-Stansted in 2003, Coast Air won the contract for ground services in competition with SAS Ground Services.

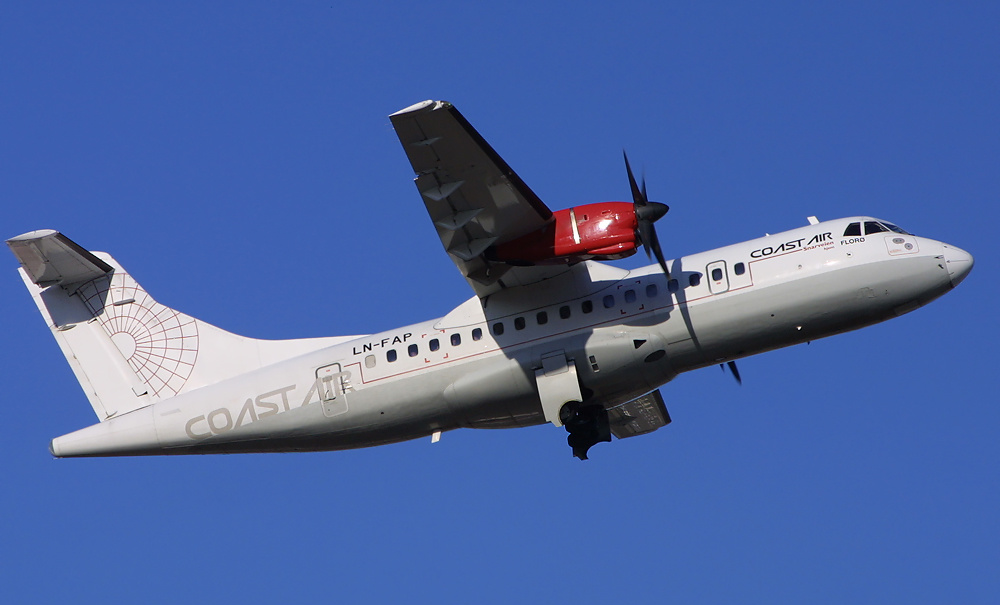
ATR-42

With the freeing up of aircraft after the 2003 PSO contract losses, Coast Air introduced and additional daily flight to Aberdeen. However, this was countered by Widerøe, who also started flying the route with Bombardier Dash 8-Q400 aircraft. Coast Air also introduced three daily flights from Stord to Oslo. On 5 May, the company started flights between Kristiansund Airport, Kvernberget and Trondheim Airport, Værnes, after having received a NOK 150,000 subsidy from the Municipality of Kristiansund for marketing the route. The competition to Aberdeen proved to be too fierce, and Coast Air terminated operations in December. In September, the company ended in court with the labor union, regarding whether the company had promised them a fifth week of holiday in earlier negotiations; the company lost the court case.

On 2 June 2003, Coast Air started its first head-on competition with Scandinavian Airlines. Using the ATR planes, Coast Air started with two daily round services between Haugesund and Oslo Airport, Gardermoen. By September, Coast Air increased to three daily round trips, and reduced prices to NOK 500. From 9 October, Scandinavian Airlines reduced their prices by 22% on the route. On 16 February, Coast Air also started competing with Braathens and Widerøe on the route between Stavanger and Bergen, marketing it as a low-fare service and ticket prices as low as NOK 199. The Haugesund–Oslo route cost Coast Air NOK 11 million in 2003. In March 2004, Coast Air was forced to close the Stord to Oslo route, after several reductions in frequency during the past year. To create more inertia on the Bergen–Stavanger route, Coast Air also started a cooperation with DAT, where the latter flew an extra daily round trip. Following the losses of the Haugesund–Oslo and Bergen–Stavanger routes, they were terminated in May 2004. In December, the Norwegian Competition Authority started investigating Scandinavian Airlines for illegal price dumping on the Oslo–Haugesund route. The authority suspected that SAS had illegally cross-subsidized the route to fend off the competition, and announced the company would be fined NOK 20 million. The case ended in Oslo District Court, where Scandinavian Airlines was found not guilty. Though initially appealed by the authority, the matter was settled out-of-court in December 2007, in which the airline agreed that they had broken the law, but that since it happened just after the act came into power, they would not have to pay the fine.

=== Vildanden ===
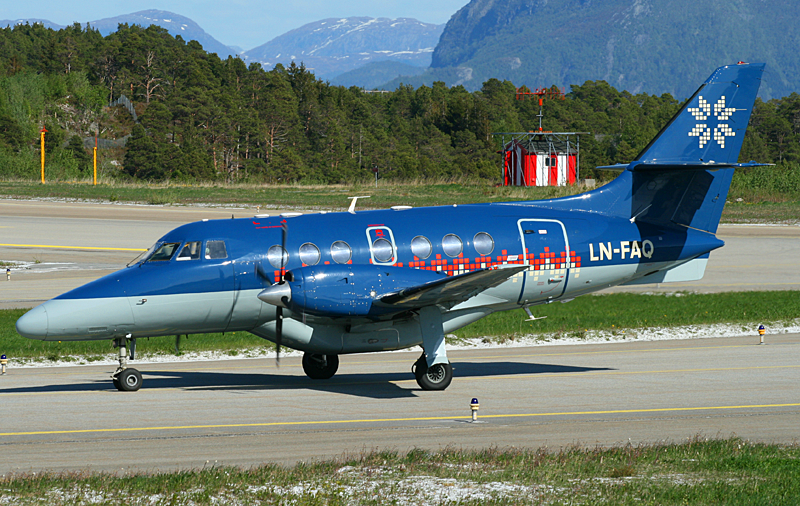
A Coast Air Jetstream 31 at Kristiansund Airport, Kvernberget

On 23 November 2004, eighteen local investors founded the airline Vildanden to start scheduled flights from Skien Airport, Geiteryggen. For a long period, there had been a public debate about closing the airport. It was decided to operate the company as a virtual airline, and wet lease operations from other companies. In October 2004, a contract was signed with Coast Air, who would operate a Jetstream 31 aircraft between Skien and Bergen. Coast Air also bought 20% of Vildanden. Skien Airport had then been closed since 2002, following the increased domestic and international traffic from near-by Sandefjord Airport, Torp.

Initial service would have 16 weekly departures to Bergen Airport, Flesland. The main targeted market segment was the offshore petroleum industry, and the departure times were designed to meet helicopter routes to offshore installations. The company estimated that one quarter of travelers would be people commuting to the North Sea. Norsk Hydro, who have a lot of employees in the Grenland area, stated that they could not start using Vildanden because they had an agreement to use SAS Braathens' services from Sandefjord. The first scheduled service flew on 24 January 2005, carrying eight passenger.

On 19 April, a new Jetstream 32 aircraft was taken into service. This allowed capacity to increase from 12 to 19 passengers, and at the same time travel time was reduced from 47 to 39 minutes. By September, the most popular departures were being fully booked, and Vildanden asked Coast Air for a larger aircraft, with about 30 seats. In addition to allowing more passengers, larger planes would give higher comfort, and allow a more flexible ticket pricing scheme. An agreement with Danish Air Transport (DAT) to operate an ATR 42, with a capacity of 48 seats, was signed by Vildanden in mid October.

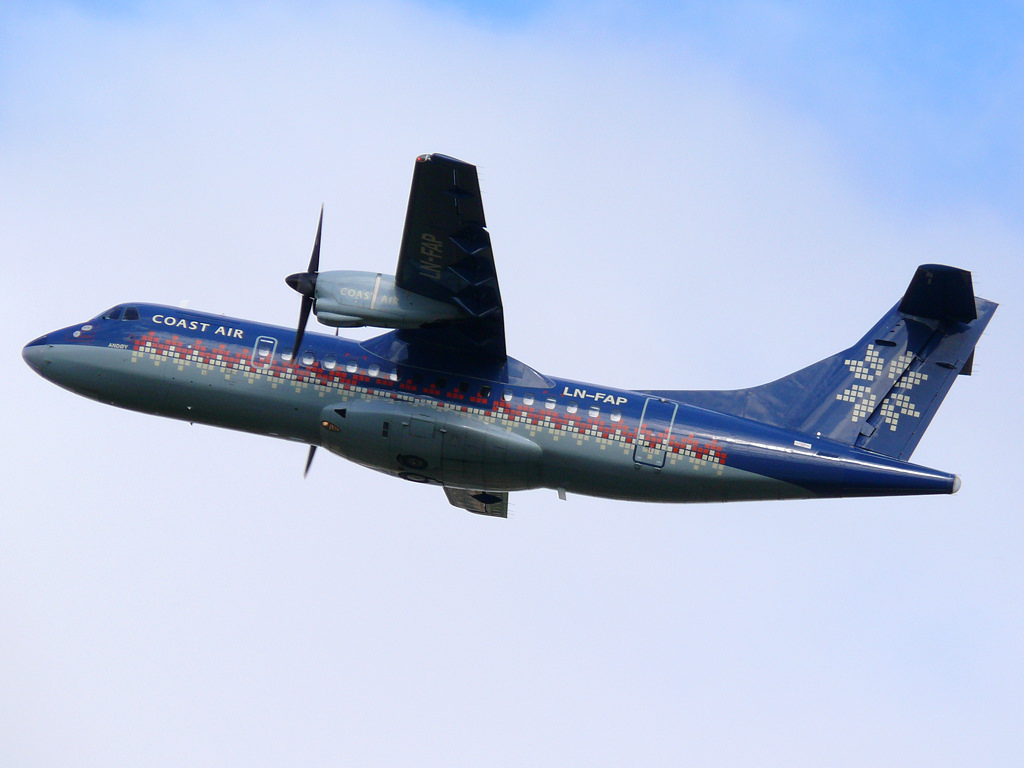
Coast Air ATR 42 LN-FAP

To be able to breach the agreement with Coast Air—who still had a wet leasing contract, but were not able to put into operation a larger aircraft—the company Skien Lufttransport AS was created, and it purchased all the revenue and passenger rights from Vildanden. At the same time, it became the legal counterpart for DAT. The new aircraft was put into service on 31 October, branded with the Vildanden logo. Coast Air chose to continue operating the route between Bergen and Skien in their own name, and used the same aircraft and slot times. At Skien Airport, the Vildanden passengers were given the choice between Coast Air and Vildanden, and all nineteen chose Vildanden. On the return flight, three passengers chose each airline. Both aircraft flew to Skien, but due to heavy rain, only the aircraft from DAT was able to land. The passengers who had taken the Coast Air aircraft were instead forced to land at Sandefjord Airport.

The following day, Coast Air terminated their flights, but stated that they still had an agreement with Vildanden. Skien Lufttransport on their hand stated that Vildanden was now a sleeping company, and that contract therefore was terminated. Both companies considered the incident a legal matter. In December, the two companies settled out of court.

=== Bankruptcy ===
Until 2004, Coast Air was owned by the holding company Kystfly AS (Norwegian for "Coast Air"), which was again owned by four people: Trygve Seglem through TS Invest, Harry Aase through Aase Invest, Asbjørn Utne and the Hystad family through Karmsund Maritime Invest. From 2001 to 2003, NOK 35 million were given in private placements to the company, but in February 2004, the Hystad family chose to withdraw from the corporation. At the time the company had 78 employees. By April the company was on the verge of bankruptcy, but private placements by Seglem and Aase meant the company could continue operating. However, the entire ATR 42-fleet would be sold, and Coast Air was to change focus to the wet-leasing market with the Jetstream 31 aircraft.

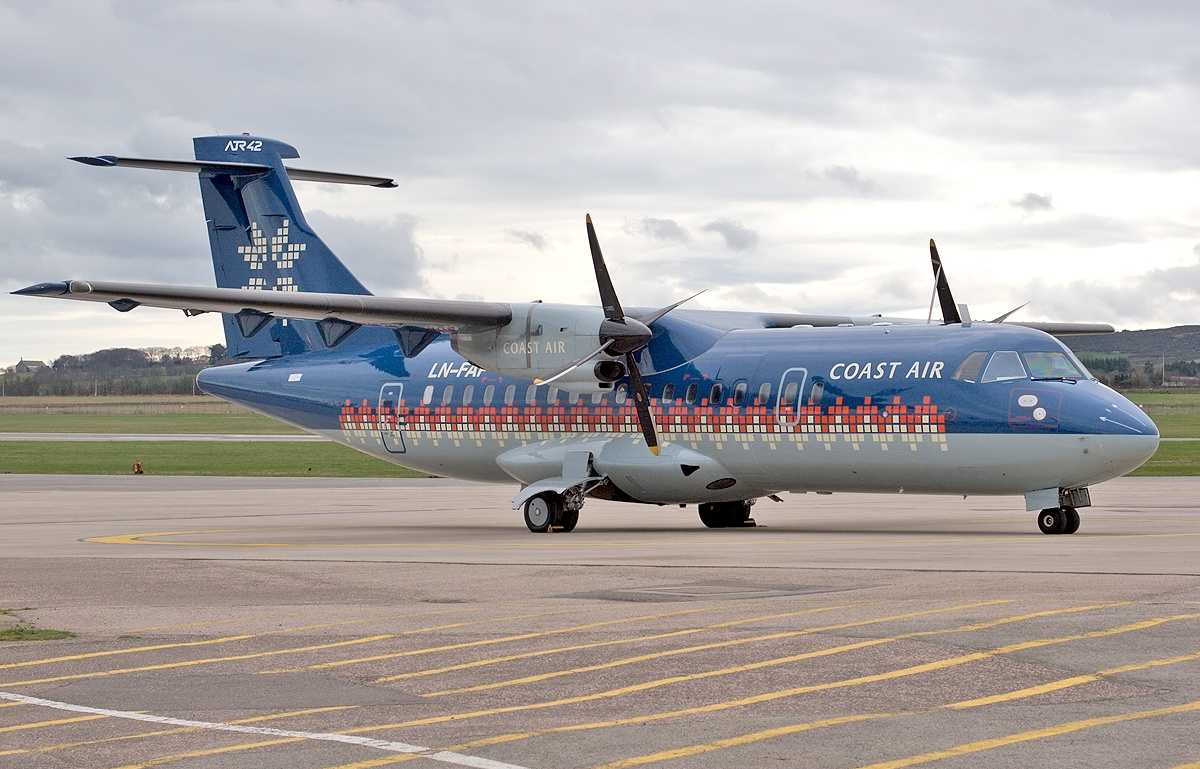
Coast Air ATR 42 at Aberdeen Airport

In August 2004, Seglem bought the entire company from the partners. After the reorganization, the company made a small profit in the last quarter of 2004. However, for the whole 2004, the company lost NOK 17.6 million. In September, Coast Air started flying the Stord–Oslo route again, using the ATR planes, following the termination by Golden Air. On 19 November, Coast Air also started a route between Stord, Haugesund and Sandefjord once per week. In 2005, the company also introduced a flight between Haugesund and Molde Airport, Årø. In February 2006, the company started flying twice a day from Sandefjord to Stockholm using the Jetstream aircraft. With increased traffic and the new PSO contracts, Coast Air received a third ATR 42 aircraft in April. Restructurization led to Coast Air dropping ground services, and from 1 May 2007, SAS Ground Services handled Coast Air's planes at Haugesund. The company also introduced in-flight breakfast on all ATR 42-flights. In addition, it started with two daily round trips from Haugesund to Copenhagen Airport in Denmark. The airline also introduced a business lounge for passengers traveling in Super Economy class. In November, another route was opened with two weekly round services from Stord to Gdańsk in Poland.

On 23 January 2008, the board of Coast Air filed for bankruptcy. High costs made the owner Seglem lose faith in future profits. The company had lost more than NOK 100 million since 2001. It was Norway's fourth largest airline at the time. The company lost NOK 30 million in 2007, and Seglem was stated that he was tired of covering the losses of the company. He also felt that the agreement the company had with the pilots gave less working hours compared to the competitors Norwegian Air Shuttle and Danish Air Transport, and the lack of understanding from the pilots made him give up. Half the 95 employees in the company were pilots. All the aircraft were owned by the mother company Kystfly, and there were no values in the estate. DAT offered to purchase the three ATR 42 aircraft, and hire part of the crew who lost their jobs as a consequence of the bankruptcy.

Widerøe announced that it would take up the routes from Haugesund to Copenhagen. After an extraordinary PSO tender, Widerøe was awarded the flights to Røros, while Air Norway was awarded the flights to Fagernes. With the fall of Coast Air, Stord Airport was without any scheduled routes and income, and lost NOK 350,000 per month until a new service was in place. The routes to Stord were taken over by Sun Air of Scandinavia, who operate Dornier 328 aircraft on franchise from British Airways.

== Destinations ==
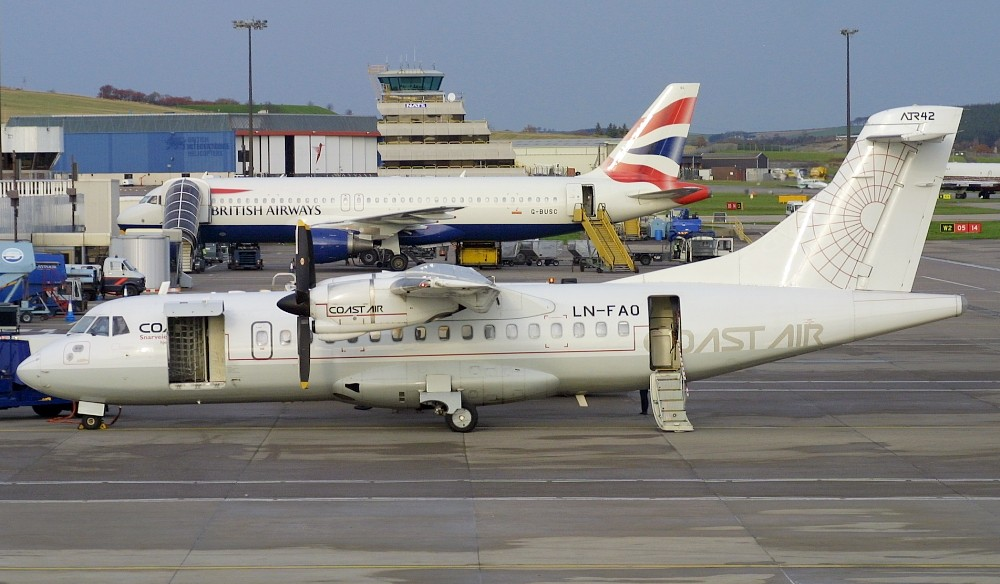
Coast Air ATR-42 at Aberdeen Airport, with a British Airways Airbus A320 in the background

As of January 2008, Coast Air operated to the following destinations

Coast Air destinations
City	Country	Airport	IATA	ICAO
Aberdeen	United Kingdom	Aberdeen Airport	ABZ	EGPD
Bergen	Norway	Bergen Airport, Flesland	BGO	ENBR
Copenhagen	Denmark	Copenhagen Airport	CPH	EKCH
Fagernes	Norway	Fagernes Airport, Leirin	VBD	ENFG
Haugesund	Norway	Haugesund Airport, Karmøy	HAU	ENHD
Molde	Norway	Molde Airport, Årø	MOL	ENML
Oslo	Norway	Oslo Airport, Gardermoen	OSL	ENGM
Røros	Norway	Røros Airport	RRS	ENRO
Sandefjord	Norway	Sandefjord Airport, Torp	TRF	ENTO
Stord	Norway	Stord Airport, Sørstokken	SPR	ENSO
Trondheim	Norway	Trondheim Airport, Værnes	TRD	ENVA
Gdańsk	Poland	Gdańsk Lech Wałęsa Airport	GDN	EPGD
