= Røros Airport =

Røros Airport Røros lufthavn
- IATA: RRS; ICAO: ENRO

Summary
- Airport type: Civil
- Operator: Avinor
- Serves: Røros Municipality, Norway
- Location: Røros
- Elevation AMSL: 626 m / 2,053 ft
- Coordinates: 62°34′42″N 11°20′32″E
- Website: avinor.no

Map

Runways
Direction	Length		Surface
Direction	m	ft	Surface
13/31	1,740	5,643	Asphalt

Statistics (2014)
- Passengers: 21,575
- Aircraft movements: 2,768
- Cargo (tonnes): 0

Røros Airport (Norwegian: Røros lufthavn; IATA: RRS, ICAO: ENRO) is a regional airport located 2 kilometers (1.2 mi) from the town of Røros in Trøndelag county, Norway. The asphalt runway has the physical dimensions 1,740 by 40 meters (5,710 by 130 ft) and is aligned 14/32. Scheduled services are provided to Oslo by Widerøe. The main general aviation user is Rørosfly, a pilot school, and the aviation club Røros Flyklubb.

Plans for an airport started in 1954 and the same year a provisional 900 meters (3,000 ft) runway was built. Scheduled services with Braathens SAFE commenced in 1957, when a 1,180-meter (3,870 ft) runway was completed. Upgrades from de Havilland Heron to Fokker F27 Friendship aircraft caused Braathens to abandon the airport until 1963, when the current asphalt runway was opened. Braathens remained at Røros until 2001, when Widerøe took over. Based on public service obligations, the routes have variously been operated by Widerøe, Danish Air Transport, Coast Air, Air Leap and Danu Oro Transportas.

== History ==
The initiative to build an airport in Røros was taken by a group of individuals in 1954, with Olav Bergersen as the most enthusiastic. They contacted Braathens SAFE and asked if they were interested in operating flights out of the town. The airline had recently gained the right to fly between Oslo Airport, Fornebu and Trondheim Airport, Værnes, and was therefore asked if they would be interested in making a stop-over for some of their services in Røros. Ludvig G. Braathen had been traveling around Norway and encouraging municipalities to build regional airports, stating that he wanted more but smaller airports than the central authorities were planning. He succeeded at having similar airports built in Hamar and Notodden.

Røros Flyklubb was founded on 7 October 1955. They followed up on Bergersen's initiative and made formal contacts with the Norwegian Aero Club and the Civil Aviation Administration (CAA). The latter inspected the town on 16 November, concluding that the locality was suitable for an east–west runway. Also the Royal Norwegian Air Force showed interest, primarily to use as an emergency airfield. The centerline of the runway was decided upon on 14 February 1956, after which a cost estimate was calculated at 455,000 Norwegian krone (NOK), excluding buildings, for a 1,300-meter (4,300 ft) runway.

The airport was incorporated as Bergstadens Flyplass A/L on 2 July 1956. Funding was secured through the sale of shares. Construction began the following day, even though sufficient funding had yet to be secured. The military provided five trucks, while the rest of the work was contracted. Two weeks later, on 17 July, the first landing took place with a Piper Super Cub. Sufficient work completed by August, allowing an air show to be carried out on 1 and 2 August to raise capital to continue construction. By mid-September a 900-by-40-meter (2,950 by 130 ft) gravel runway was completed and approved by inspections of the CAA and Braathens.

The second stage of construction saw the extension of the runway to 1,180 by 40 meters (3,870 by 130 ft). It also saw the construction of a terminal consisting of an expedition building measuring 8 by 4 meters (26 by 13 ft), with an upper story used as a control tower, measuring 2.5 by 2.5 meters (8 ft 2 in by 8 ft 2 in). It cost 15,000 kr and lacked such amenities as water. Telephone lines were installed by Norway Telecom and Royal Dutch Shell built a 12-cubic-meter (420 cu ft) fuel tank.

The airport received its technical approval on 18 July 1957 and opened the following day. Services were provided daily by Braathens using their 15-passenger de Havilland Heron aircraft to both Trondheim and Oslo. Because Braathens was soon to retire its Herons, the runway was extended to 1,300 meters (4,300 ft) the following year. By then the construction costs had risen to NOK 486,000.

With the introduction of the 44-passenger Fokker F27 Friendship in 1958, the runway at Røros became substandard. Braathens therefore terminated its routes to Røros, as they also were forced to do in Notodden and Hamar. Two upgrades were needed. First the runway was extended to 1,600 meters (5,200 ft) and then it received asphalt. This was not completed until 1963, when Braathens resumed its route. By 1967 the runway had been further extended to 1,720 meters (5,640 ft). A new combined terminal building and control tower was also built. An aerodrome flight information service and radio beacon became operational in 1972, allowing for instrument flight rules at the airport.

The Friendships remained in use on the route until the 1977, when they were retired and replaced with the Boeing 737-200, with more than twice the capacity. This created an overcapacity on the route and Braathens and the local community started cooperating to increase demand through marketing Røros as a cultural, heritage and conference destination. Rørosfly was established at Røros Airport in 1985. It operated as a general aviation company, with particular focus on aviation schooling. A new terminal building was completed in 1987 and opened on 27 August. Braathens replaced its -200s with the newer Boeing 737-500 in the early 1990s.

Throughout its history at the airport, Braathens SAFE never made any profits on the route. For this the aircraft were too large. Prior to 1994 the airlines received concessions to operate the various routes. This were granted based on that some routes were profitable while other would operate at a loss. From 1 April 1994 the airline market in Norway was deregulated, and Braathens was no longer obliged to operate to Røros. The authorities announced that they would introduce a public service obligation (PSO) auction, financed through a 10 kr fee which would be charged on all domestic routes. Braathens and Scandinavian Airlines System agreed to waiver the fee in exchange for still operating their unprofitable routes.

Røros Airport had a peak patronage in 1996, with more than 30,000 passengers. The airport was taken over by the CAA (later renamed Avinor) in 1998. Starting in 1998 Braathens experienced a period of harsh financial performance. To cut costs, the airline therefore on 2 January 2001 terminated all its unprofitable routes, including to Røros. As a temporary solution, Danish Air Transport flew the route until 31 July, after bidding NOK 500,000 per month. A public tender was issued, and Widerøe won the contract to operate from 1 August. Ground handling at the airport was taken over by Røros Flyservice. Patronage in the last year of Braathens operations was 27,000 passengers. By 2002 this had dropped to about 8,000. The main reasons were more inconvenient flight times, smaller capacity and higher prices, caused by the contractual obligations in the PSO agreement. In particular the number of course and conference passengers dropped to near null.

Coast Air won the next contract and took over flights from 1 April 2006 using the ATR 42 aircraft. On The board of Coast Air filed for bankruptcy on 23 January 2008. The Ministry of Transport and Communications attempted to find a replacement for Coast Air, contacting six different airlines. Widerøe, Air Norway, and Danish Air Transport expressed interest to resume operations on the route to Oslo, with Widerøe being awarded a temporary contract and starting operations on 4 February 2008.

Danu Oro Transportas began operating a permanent service from 1 April 2009 until Widerøe won back the contract for the route 1 December 2012. During winters of 2010 to 2012, Skyways operated two weekly round trips to Stockholm-Arlanda Airport, using Fokker 50 aircraft, serving ski resorts in the Funäsdalen area.

== Facilities ==
Røros features an asphalt runway with physical dimensions 1,740 by 40 meters (5,710 by 130 ft). The runway safety area measures 2,100 by 300 meters (6,890 by 980 ft). The runway has a declared take-off run available of 1,640 meters (5,380 ft) and a landing distance available of 1,580 meters (5,180 ft). The runway is aligned 14/32 and is equipped with instrument landing system category I. It is situated at an elevation of 626 meters (2,054 ft).

There is a simple terminal building and tower. There is paid parking, a taxi stand and rental cars at the terminal. The airport is situated 2 kilometers (1.2 mi) west of the town center; there is no public transit between the airport and the town.

== Airlines and destinations ==
This airport was left with no scheduled flights after Air Leap ceased operations on January 24, 2022. From 28. January 2022 the Norwegian airline Widerøe operates the Oslo route on behalf of the Norwegian government. On 31 March 2024, Widerøe will operate the last flight on behalf of the Norwegian government and, from 1 April 2024, the Danish airline DAT will be the new operator of the PSO-route between Oslo and Røros.

Rørosfly was a flight school company based at the airport, operating a fleet of five aircraft. The aviation club Røros Flyklubb is also based at the airport. They own a Cessna 172SP.

Airlines	Destinations
DAT	Oslo

== Statistics ==
Røros airport had 21,575 passengers in 2014. The airport served 2,768 aircraft movements and handled 2 kilograms of cargo. Rørosfly is responsible for about three-quarters of the aircraft movements.

Annual passenger traffic
Year	Passengers	% Change
2025	18,505	▲1.7%
2024	18,190	▲2.4%
2023	17,770	▲27.4%
2022	13,950	▲124.0%
2021	6,227	▼ -59.9%
2020	15,532	▼ -40.8%
2019	26,256	▲7.9%
2018	24,341	▼ -0.5%
2017	24,473	▲16.3%
2016	21,042	▲2.9%
2015	20,456	

== Bibliography ==
- Tjomsland, Audun; Wilsberg, Kjell (1995). Braathens SAFE 50 år: Mot alle odds (in Norwegian). Oslo. ISBN 82-990400-1-9.
