= Fagernes Airport, Leirin =

Airport in Nord-Aurdal, Norway

Fagernes Airport, Leirin Fagernes lufthavn, Leirin
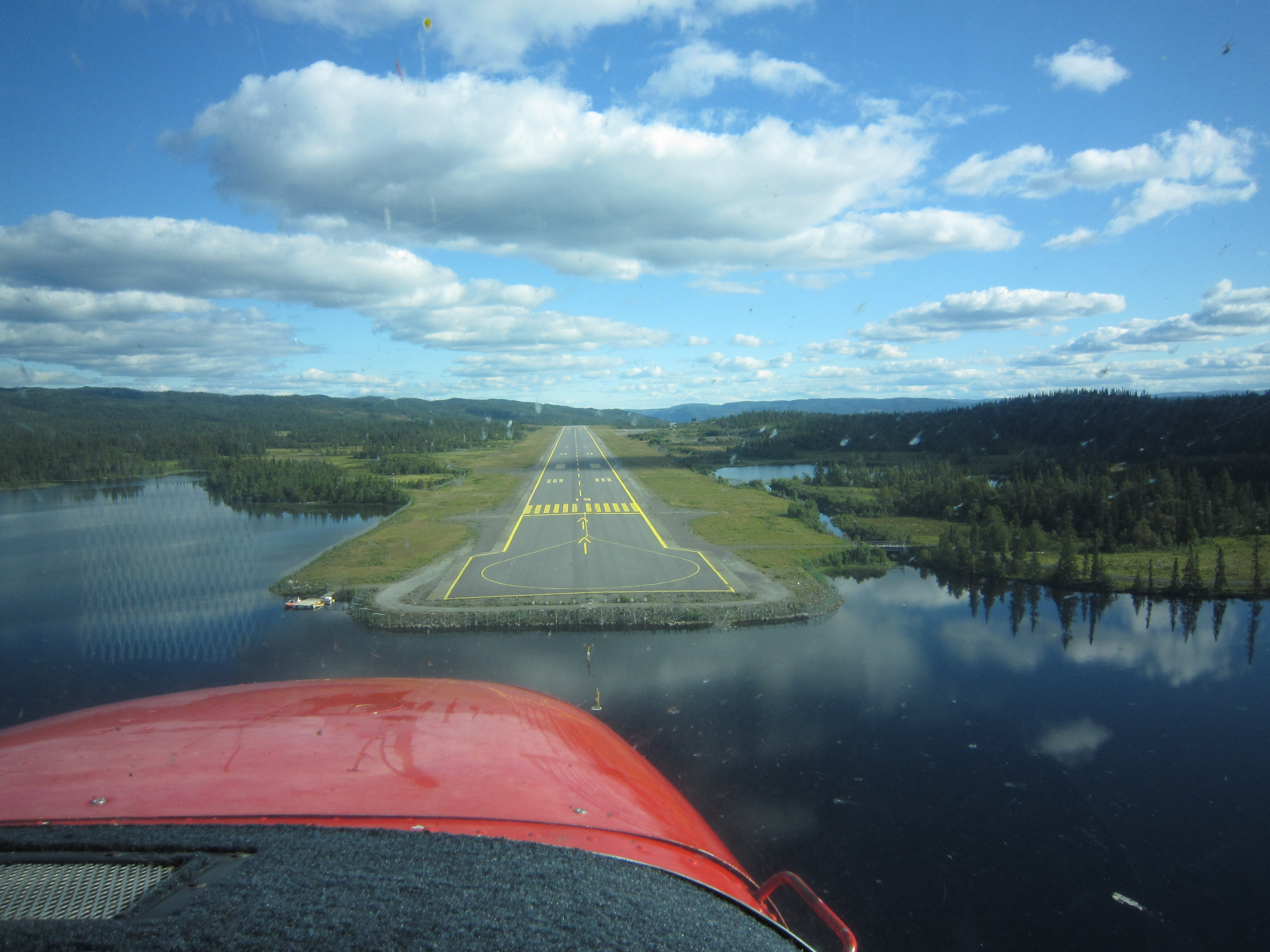
- IATA: none; ICAO: ENFG

Summary
- Airport type: Non Public
- Serves: Fagernes, Norway
- Location: Fagernes, Nord-Aurdal, Innlandet
- Elevation AMSL: 822 m (2,697 ft)
- Coordinates: 61°00′56″N 009°17′17″E

Map
- Location within Norway

Runways
Direction	Length		Surface
Direction	m	ft	Surface
15/33	2,049	6,722	Asphalt

Statistics (2017)
- Passengers: 1,818
- Aircraft movements: 114
- Cargo (tonnes): 0
- Source: Norwegian AIP at Avinor; Statistics from Avinor

Fagernes Airport, Leirin (Norwegian: Fagernes lufthavn, Leirin; ICAO: ENFG) is a general aviation airport in the town of Fagernes in Nord-Aurdal Municipality, Innlandet county, Norway. It has been an airport for passenger flights, serving Fagernes and the surrounding valleys of Valdres, Hallingdal and Gudbrandsdal in Southern Norway, 190 kilometres (120 mi) from Oslo. Opened in 1987, it was owned and operated by state-owned Avinor. The airport is located 822 metres (2,697 ft) above sea level, and has a 2,049-metre (6,722 ft) runway. It did provide a regional service for the local population to Oslo, subsidized by the Ministry of Transport, as well as charter services during winter serving the nearby ski resorts. In 2014, the airport had 6,393 passengers. The driving time Fagernes–Oslo, around 2½ hours, has made flights to Oslo unattractive; most passengers used the Oslo route for transfers. It has also been used for other destinations. The road has also been improved compared to how it was in 1987.

The airport was originally planned as a conventional regional airport, but during its construction it was redesigned to accommodate larger jet aircraft. Originally owned by six local municipalities, it was taken over by the state in 1996. Norsk Air started operations in 1987, but terminated them the following year. Coast Air introduced state-subsidized services in 1990, and continued until the contract was won by Teddy Air in 1996. From 2000 the airport was served by Guard Air, but following their bankruptcy in 2001, services were taken over by Widerøe for six months, when Arctic Air won a one-year contract. Coast Air resumed the service from 2003 to 2008, when they went bankrupt. Air Norway then operated services for one year, pending DOT LT's take over in 2009.

== Facilities ==
Fagernes was an international airport with a 1,800-square-metre (19,000 sq ft) terminal building which includes immigration and customs clearing facilities, a cafeteria, duty-free store and several car rentals. Parking is free, and there was a shuttle service to Fagernes town center which coordinates with all scheduled services to Oslo. The airport was closed on Saturdays. The asphalt paved runway is 2,049 by 45 metres (6,722 ft × 148 ft), without a taxiway. The apron has standings for three A320/737-size jets, which allows charter aircraft up to the size of Airbus A321 and Boeing 757 to use the airport.

== History ==
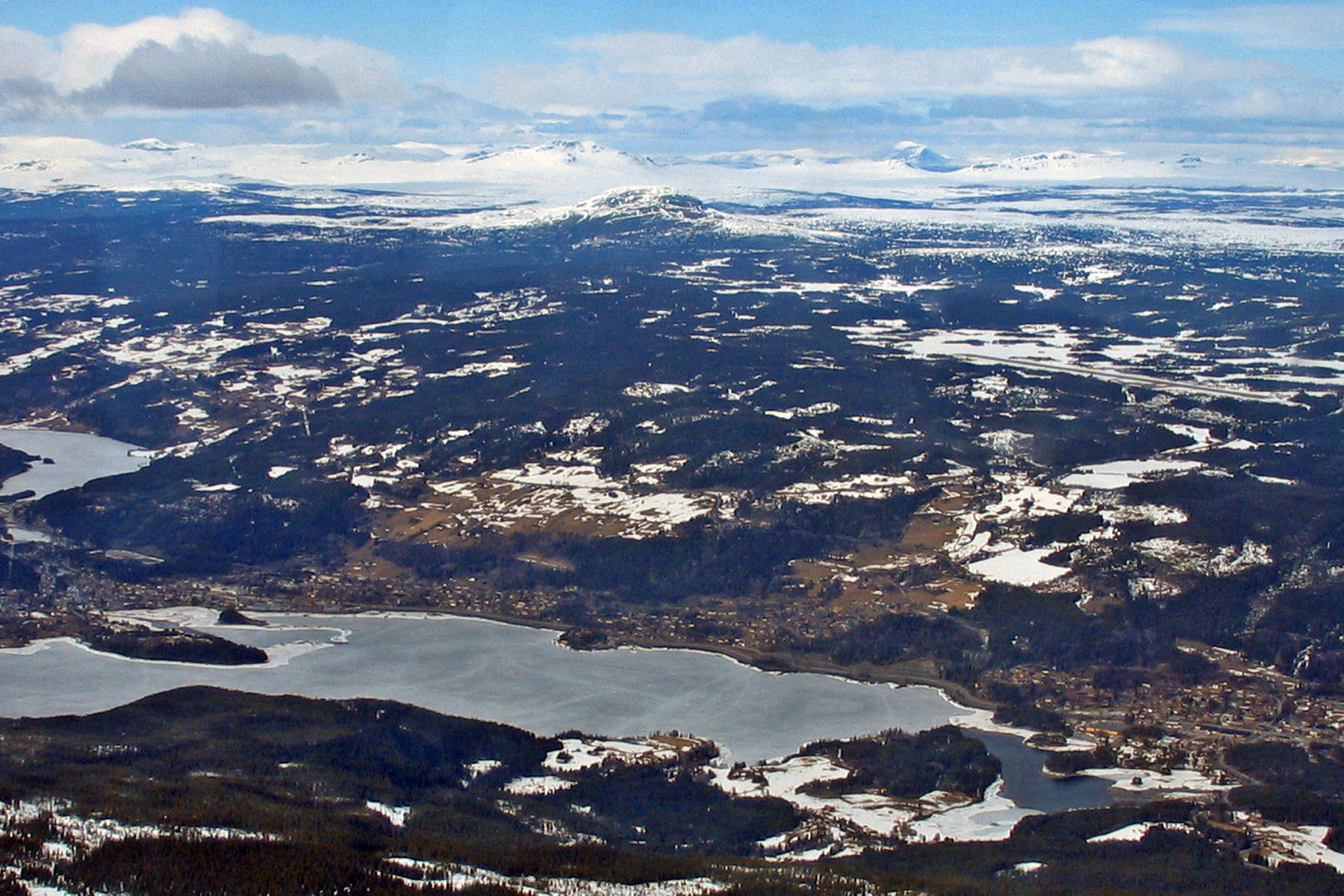
Aerial view of the airport

Plans for an airport at Fagernes were initiated in 1975, and approved by Parliament in 1984, along with three other regional airports, at Rørvik, Mosjøen and Førde Airport, Bringeland. Construction started in 1985, but plans were changed in 1986, when local authorities decided to build a longer runway to allow charter flights. The nearby Geilo Airport, Dagali, a two-hour drive away, had already made a similar decision, and was in the process of extending its own runway. The airport opened on 31 October 1987. The state had initially paid 60% of the NOK 29.3 million investments for the 800-metre (2,600 ft) version of the airport, and the rest was financed by municipal and county grants. The increased cost of building a longer runway was estimated at NOK 59 million, financed by loans and municipal grants, plus a NOK 10 million investment from Dansk Folkeferie. The airport was owned by Valdres Lufthavn A/S, a privately held limited company with six municipalities as its principal shareholders. Following the airport's establishment, the Norwegian State Railways' Valdres Line was closed in 1989.

By 1988, building costs had increased from NOK 88 to 131 million. The municipalities had co-signed for a foreign loan, and were forced to pay NOK 3.5 million annually just in interest, in addition to the operating cost of the airport; these were aggravated by not only the loss of the sole scheduled service, but also considerably less charter traffic than estimated. In 1990, the airport company was forced to refinance, and NOK 61 of 85 million in dept was refinanced, and the obligations transferred from the airport company to the municipalities and the county. However, by 1991, passenger numbers were above 20,000, three quarters coming from charter traffic. On 1 January 1996, Fagernes Airport was nationalized, along with 25 other regional airports, and put under the control of the Norwegian Airport Authority (now Avinor). Following the closure of Geilo Airport, Dagali in 2003, Fagernes experienced an increase in charter traffic.

=== Operators ===
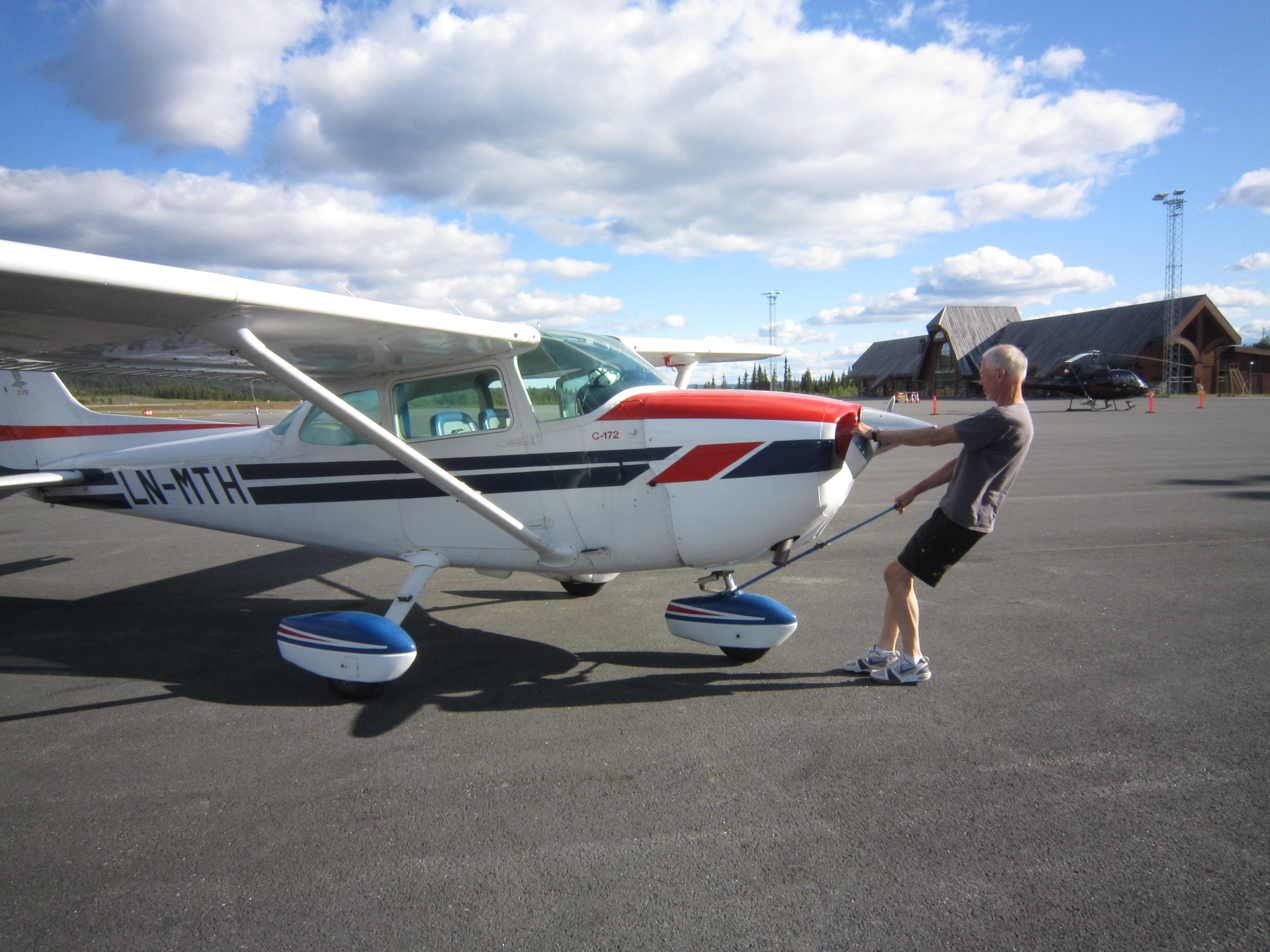
Cessna 172 at the airport

Norsk Air started a route from Fagernes to Oslo Airport, Fornebu, and Bergen Airport, Flesland, on 4 November 1987, using Embraer EMB 120 Brasilia aircraft. The route turned out to be unprofitable, and was terminated on 1 June 1988, after the company had lost NOK 5 million. About 4,500 passengers were using the airport each year, compared to the 120,000 carried annually by the Valdresekpressen coach service on the 190 kilometres (120 mi) to Oslo. Local politicians contacted Widerøe to discuss the possibility of introducing scheduled services, but the airline stated that it would only fly if it was granted subsidies.

An agreement for the provision of subsidies on services to Oslo and Bergen was not reached with the Ministry of Transport until 1990. The state agreed to provide NOK 4.5 million, with the municipalities providing another NOK 2.6 million, and Oppland County Municipality NOK 2 million. The county and municipalities were allowed to reduce their subsidies in the event that passenger numbers increased. Although initially planned to be introduced in January 1990, Widerøe later dropped out, and the contract was awarded to Coast Air, who began operating on 3 September 1990, using a de Havilland Canada Twin Otter aircraft. The deal was the most expensive subsidy for regional aviation in the country; while the national average was NOK 156, the Fagernes route cost the authorities NOK 2,000 per passenger.

Coast Air continued to provide a service until 1 August 1996, when Fagernes became a trial for the use of public service obligations for regional aviation in Norway. The first contract was won by Teddy Air, to serve both Oslo and Bergen. The contract agreed a subsidy of NOK 23.7 million for three years, 15% less than Coast Air had been receiving. Teddy Air operated until 1 August 1999, when Widerøe took over using de Havilland Canada Dash 8-100 aircraft. At the same time, the route from Fagernes to Bergen was dropped from the schedule. Widerøe's contract lasted only eight months, until 1 April 2000, when Guard Air, who bid NOK 6.93 million per year, won the tender, and started flying with Dornier 228 aircraft. On 8 October 2001, Guard Air filed for bankruptcy, and the ministry signed an intermediate contract with Widerøe to fly the route. The subsequent tender was won by Arctic Air, who continued operation until 31 March 2003, using Dornier 228 aircraft.

From 1 April 2003, the contract was taken over by Coast Air, who put Jetstream 31 aircraft into use. The same company won the contract again in 2006. Following Coast Air's bankruptcy on 23 January 2008, the route was taken over by Air Norway on 4 February, after an extraordinary tender, using Fairchild Metroliner aircraft. From 1 April 2009, the service was provided by DOT LT, who operated Saab 340 aircraft. The services were subsidized by the Norwegian Ministry of Transport and Communications, based on three-year public service obligation tenders.

=== Closure ===
In March 2016 the route to Oslo was closed down. The operator was Air Norway at this time. This leaves charter flights as the only traffic, and big uncertainty whether the airport should be closed down or not. The road travel time to Oslo Airport is around 2 hours 30 minutes, which is planned to be shortened by 15 minutes by 2025 (motorway Oslo–Hønefoss).

As of May 2018, there are no scheduled or charter services operated at Fagernes Airport. Charter services were provided during the winter season, serving the wide range of ski resorts in the area, especially Hemsedal, Geilo and Beitostølen. During the winter of 2010/11 and 2011/12, weekly services were provided by Thomas Cook Airlines using an Airbus A320, on behalf of the British tour operator Neilson, serving London Gatwick - Fagernes on Sundays in the period of December - April. From winter 2013/2014 to winter 2017/2018, Thomson Airways did operate London Gatwick - Fagernes using a Boeing 737-800, last charter service to Fagernes was on January 25, 2018.

The airport was closed down for commercial air traffic on 1 July 2018. It continues to be usable for general aviation.

== Airlines and destinations ==
There is no scheduled or tourist charter traffic.
