= Geilo Airport, Dagali =

Airport in Hol, Norway

Geilo Airport, Dagali Geilo lufthavn, Dagali
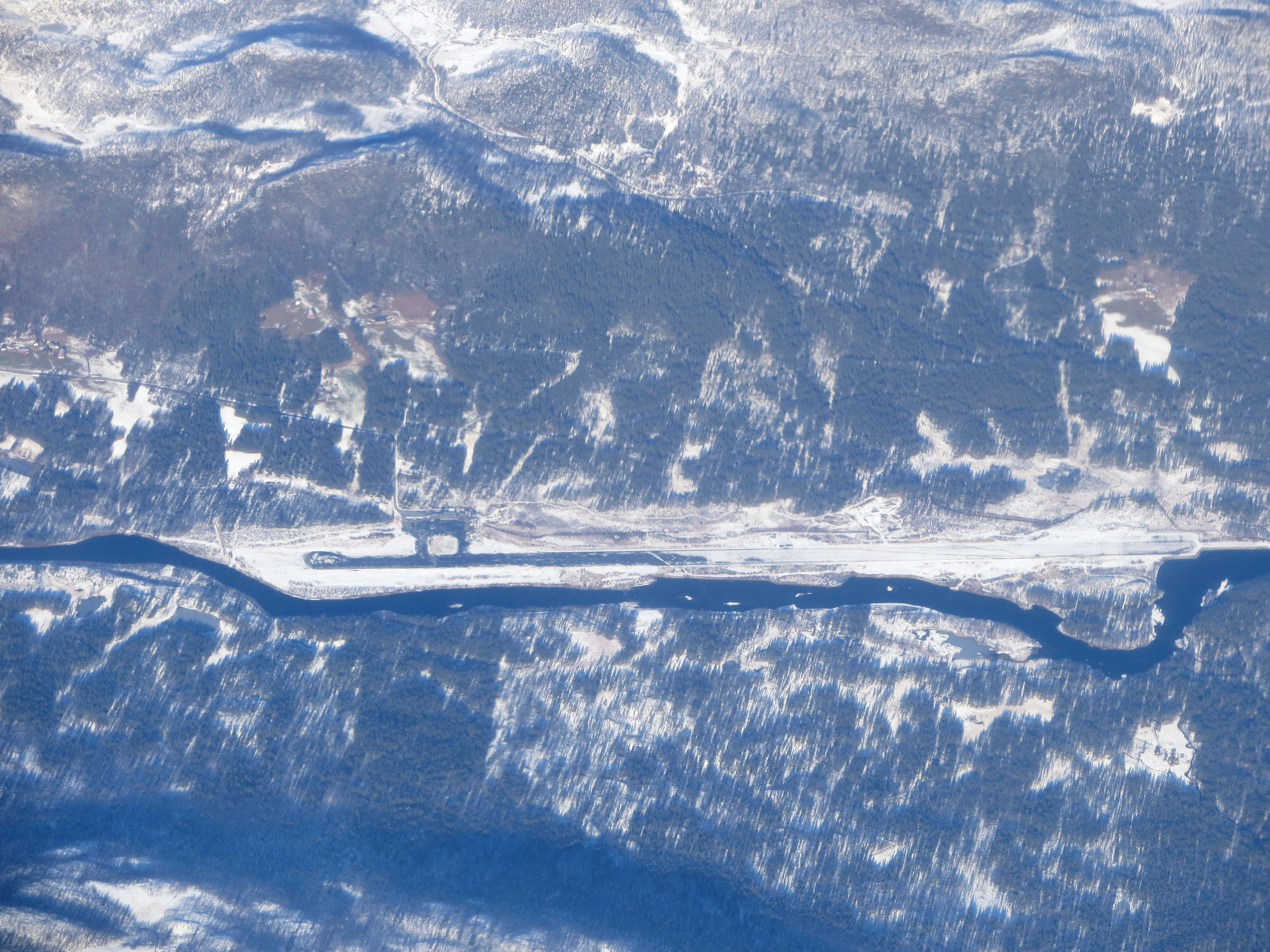
- IATA: none; ICAO: ENDI

Summary
- Airport type: Private
- Owner: Hol Municipality and Nore og Uvdal Municipality
- Operator: Geilo Lufthavn Dagali AS
- Serves: Geilo
- Location: Dagali, Hol Municipality, Norway
- Elevation AMSL: 2,618 ft (798 m)
- Coordinates: 60°25′00″N 008°30′46″E
- Website: www.geilolufthavn.no

Map
- Location within Norway

Runways
Direction	Length		Surface
Direction	m	ft	Surface
08/26	1,800	5,905	Asphalt

Statistics (2002)
- Passengers: 8,870

Geilo Airport, Dagali (Norwegian: Geilo flyplass, Dagali; formerly Geilo lufthavn, Dagali; ICAO: ENDI) is a private airport located at Dagali in Hol Municipality in Buskerud county, Norway. It was previously a public airport that was both a regional airport and served international tourist charter airlines serving the nearby ski resorts centered on Geilo. The airport opened in 1985, but failed commercially and was eventually closed in 2003.

Originally featuring a 1,300-meter (4,300 ft) runway, it was extended to 1,800 meters (5,900 ft) in 1988. Now it is limited to 850 meters (2,790 ft) which can still be used for private aircraft. The airport has been converted to a go cart track, though there is still some general aviation at the airport. The commercial services have been moved to Fagernes Airport, Leirin, which opened in 1987. The airport is owned and operated by a company that is jointly owned by Hol Municipality and Nore og Uvdal Municipality.

== History ==
Geilo Airport was opened in 1985 as a regional airport. On 20 June 1986, Coast Aero Center was awarded the concession for flying from Stavanger to Geilo Airport, Dagali until 1991. The airline used a Beechcraft 200 Super King Air on the service. At the same time, Norving started operations to Oslo. The ridership from Geilo turned out to be insufficient to make a profit, and both Coast Aero Center and Norving terminated their routes. Widerøe and Norsk Air said there was not enough ridership for them to be interested. In 1989, Coast Air received a one-year concession to operate from Geilo to Oslo and Stavanger. The company used de Havilland Canada DHC-6 Twin Otter aircraft. The service was soon limited to two round trips each week.

Construction of a runway expansion from 1,300 to 1,800 metres (4,300 to 5,900 ft) was started in 1988, allowing the airport to be served by jet aircraft in international charter traffic. The 15.3 million Norwegian krone (NOK) investment was financed through a municipal and county-guaranteed loan. Since 1984, the owners had hoped that the airport would become part of a state financing scheme that secured both guarantees for the operation of the airport, as well as subsidies to scheduled traffic. Geilo never received such status, unlike the nearby Fagernes Airport, Leirin which opened in 1987. By 1992, the mayors of Hol and Nore og Uvdal, the municipalities who owned the airport, admitted that it had been a mistake to build the airport. There were less than 1,000 passengers annually, and the scheduled traffic with Coast Air cost the municipalities NOK 1 million per year. In addition came the operating deficit of the airport itself. The company Norcharter had been created by Hol and Nore og Uvdal, along with private investors, but it failed to increase ridership, despite spending NOK 8 million on marketing the region and the airport.

Twenty-six municipally owned airports were taken over by the Norwegian Civil Aviation Administration (now Avinor) on 1 January 1996. Geilo Airport was not among these, but received a NOK 1.5 million annual grant from the state. Following Norway's entry into the Schengen Agreement in 2000, more money had to be invested in the airport to rebuild it to meet immigration requirements. The airport set a new record with 8,870 passengers in 2002. From 1 June 2003, a new company, Geilo Lufthavn Drift A/S, made an agreement to take over operations of the airport. But the airport was temporally closed from April to September, and the new company chose to not reopen the airport afterward. The airport has since been turned into a go cart track, but private aircraft can use 850 by 20 meters (2,789 by 66 ft) of the runway.

== Incidents and accidents ==
- On 25 April 1992, the pilot and passenger of a Cessna 172, en route from Molde Airport, Årø to Geilo, were killed when the aircraft crashed two kilometers east of Dagali.
- On 18 October 1992, a Piper PA-24 Comanche crashed after losing motor power at 2,300 metres (7,500 ft) altitude. The plane became a total wreck, but the pilot managed to get out after the emergency landing with only a few scratches.
- On 19 March 1993, a Beechcraft Super King Air from Trønderfly crashed 4.3 kilometres (2.7 mi) from the airport while attempting to land. Three people were killed in the accident.
