= Air Norway =

Norwegian regional airline (2003–2017)

| IATA | ICAO | Call sign |
|---|---|---|
| M3 | NFA | NORTH FLYING |
- Founded: 2003
- Commenced operations: 23 May 2003
- Ceased operations: 2017
- Hubs: Ørland Airport
- Focus cities: Oslo Airport, Gardermoen
- Fleet size: 1
- Destinations: 3
- Parent company: Nordic Air (40%); Municipality of Ørland (40%); North Flying (20%)
- Headquarters: Ørland Municipality
- Key people: Snorre Hvitsand (managing director); Audun H Møller (Operation Manager); Per Kyllingstad (chair)
- Website: www.airnorway.no

Air Norway AS was a regional airline with its head office in the town of Brekstad, a town in Ørland Municipality in Sør-Trøndelag county, Norway. It operated seven round trips a week from its hub at Ørland Airport to Oslo Airport, Gardermoen, and a single, weekly round trip from Oslo to Aalborg Airport, Denmark, using a wet lease Fairchild Metro aircraft from North Flying. The airline was founded in 2003. Following the bankruptcy of Coast Air in January 2008, the airline stepped in and was serving Fagernes Airport, Leirin with two daily flights to Oslo, and one daily flight to Trondheim Airport, but these were terminated in 2009.

== Operations ==
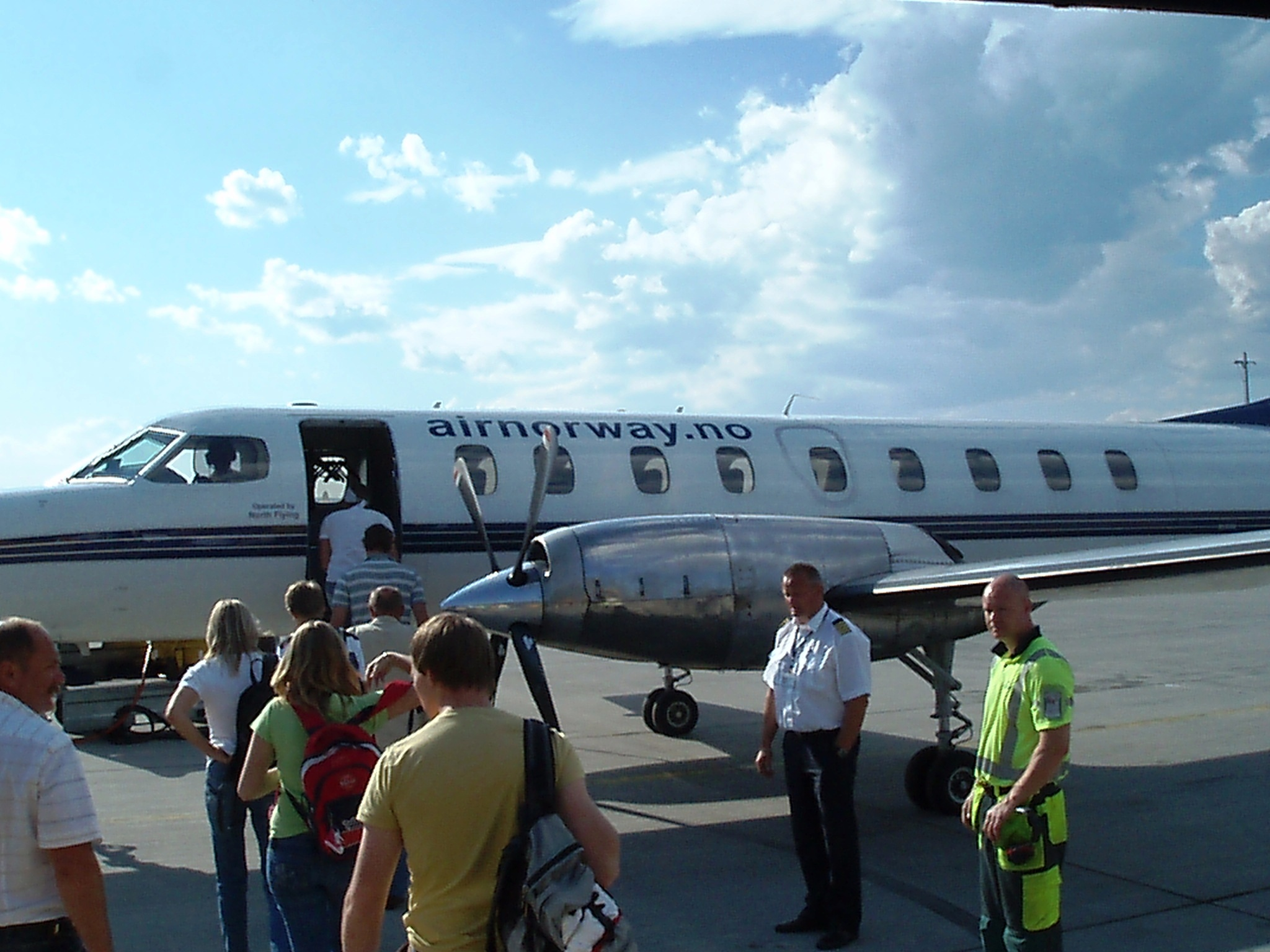
Air Norway Fairchild Metro

The airline was owned 40% by Nordic Air, 40% by the Municipality of Ørland and 20% by North Flying. All operations were flown by North Flying, who operate a 19-seat Fairchild Metro 23 in Air Norway livery. The municipality subsidised the route with NOK 1 million per year. The company had a managing director in a 20% position, plus one person who coordinated booking on an hourly basis. In 2008, the airline had a revenue of NOK 16 million and made NOK 800,000 in profit. Ørland Airport is the civilian section of the military Ørland Main Air Station. Traditionally, the main customer group for Air Norway was military personnel.

Air Norway was forced to temporarily suspend operations in 2017 due to runway repair work at Ørland Airport, its main base. Services were resumed in September 2017 before terminating again in October 2017.

== Destinations ==
The airline operated seven weekly round trips from Ørland to Oslo, with weekday flights leaving Ørland at 7:40 and returning from Oslo at 18:00. No flights were made on Saturdays, but there were two round trips to Oslo on Friday, and to Ørland on Sunday. A single, weekly round trip was made to Aalborg from Oslo, leaving on Friday evening and returning Sunday afternoon.

| City | Country | IATA | ICAO | Airport | Begin | End | Ref |
|---|---|---|---|---|---|---|---|
| Aalborg | Denmark | AAL | EKYT | Aalborg Airport | 2004 | 6 October 2017 | |
| Fagernes | Norway | VDB | ENFG | Fagernes Airport, Leirin | 2008 | 1 April 2009 | |
| Oslo | Norway | OSL | ENGM | Oslo Airport, Gardermoen | 2002 | 6 October 2017 | |
| Trondheim | Norway | TRD | ENVA | Trondheim Airport, Værnes | 2008 | 2009 | |
| Ørland/Brekstad | Norway | OLA | ENOL | Ørland Airport | 2003 | 6 October 2017 | |

== History ==
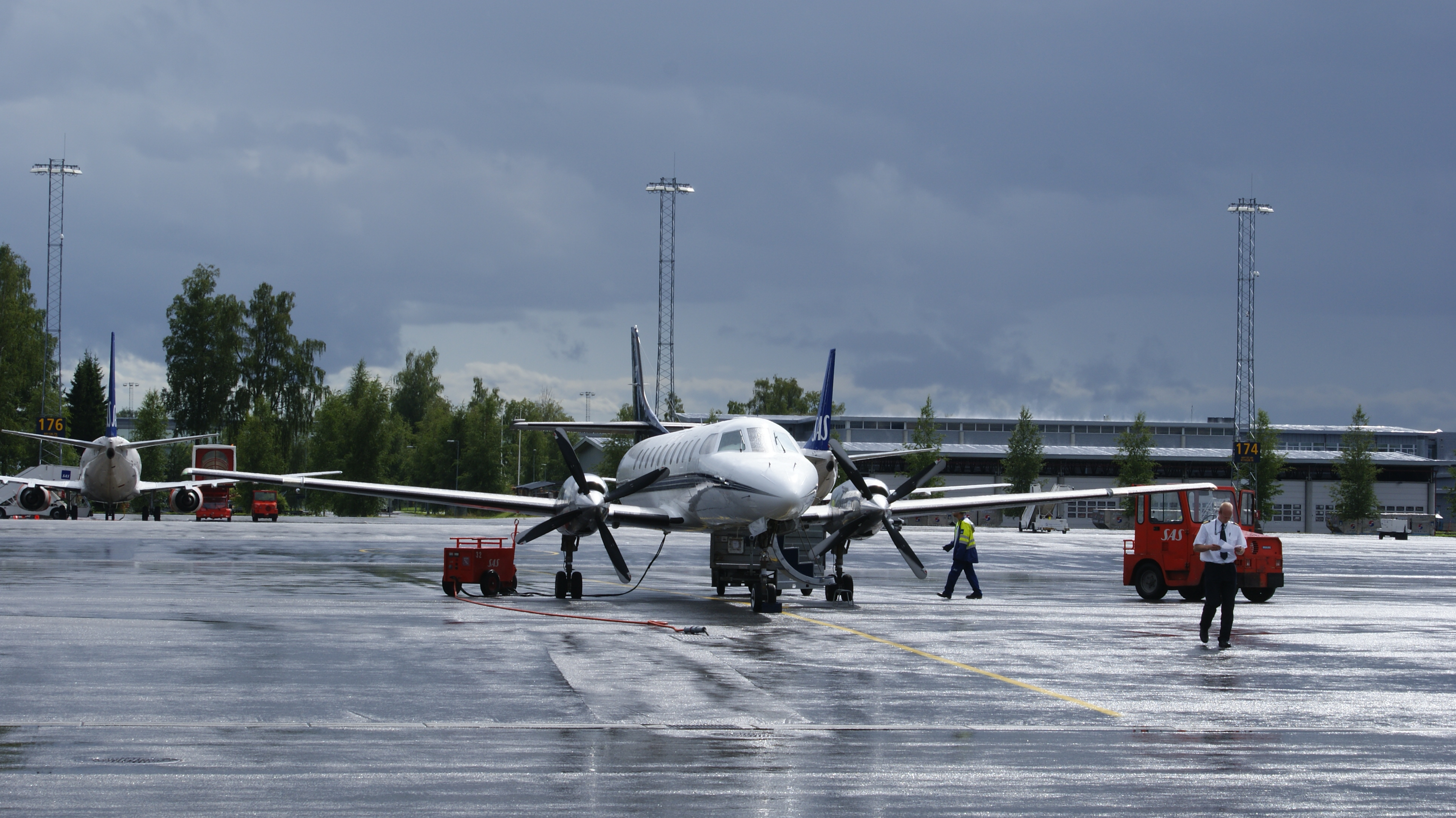
Air Norway Fairchild Metroliner at Oslo Airport, Gardermoen

Air Norway was founded in 2003 by Gunnar Hagsveen. Scheduled services from Ørland to Oslo commenced on 23 May 2003. The company had originally planned to also operate aircraft between Ørland and Bodø Airport, to two main air stations of the Norwegian Air Force, but these plans were abandoned. Just after the route commenced, the owner became seriously ill, and marketing and sales efforts were neglected, causing a less-than-predicted cabin load. Hagsveen died on 26 December, and his heirs encouraged local businesses to purchase shares in the company. Air Norway commenced weekly flights from Oslo to Aalborg Airport in Denmark from 31 January 2004. In February 2004, the company received a loan for NOK 650,000 from the municipality to operate pay off other debt. At the same time, the airline was sold to Sven Rosenvinge.

By 2005, the airline was still losing money. On 21 February, the Municipality of Ørland bought shares for NOK 1 million, while North Flying bought the remaining half of the company. Mayor Hallgeir Grøntvedt (Center Party) stated that while it was a risky investment for a municipality with limited budget, the airline was of great strategic importance for Ørland and Fosen. When the European Union introduced new security rules for airports from 1 January 2005, Ørland Airport was exempt, because of the small size of the aircraft. By April, the airport had received notice that 100% security control would still have to be introduced, costing the municipality 465,000 kr per year. At the same time, Air Norway was still losing money, and applied to the municipality to not be charged landing fees at the airport. When this was granted, it saved the company NOK 540,000 per year. In July, Air Norway transported its 10,000th passenger and signed a new contract with the Air Force, which was responsible for more than half the ridership. In November, the administration of the airline was moved from Drammen to Ørland and Fosen Næringshage. Snorre Hvitsand was then hired as managing director.

In 2006, the company experienced a 40% passenger growth, and from 6 September, Air Norway also introduced services on Wednesday. The same year, the municipality started a NOK 1.8 million upgrade to the airport. When it opened on 3 September 2007, it became an international airport and allowed transit for passengers to Aalborg, plus increased security and a general renovation of the terminal building from 1978.

Following the bankruptcy of Coast Air in January 2008, Air Norway and North Flying were awarded an interim contract to operate the route from Fagernes to Oslo, with subsidies from the Norwegian Ministry of Transport and Communications. At the same time, the airline started a route from Fagernes to Trondheim Airport, Værnes. In March, they won the public service obligation (PSO) contract, granting them the route until 31 March 2009. During the first half of 2008, ridership at Fagernes Airport was reduced by 27.3%, compared with the first half of the previous year. From 1 April 2009, the Fagernes PSO contract was lost to DOT LT, and Air Norway terminated those routes.

In 2009, Air Norway lost 1,300 passengers after the Norwegian Air Force decided to not permit their employees to travel from Ørland, but instead have to take cheaper flights from Trondheim, located about a two-hour drive away. The reduction in ridership, along with a strengthening of the Danish krone in relation to the Norwegian, caused Air Norway to lose NOK 100,000 by August 2009. The mayor of Ørland stated at that he was working to make the route receive state grants as a PSO. In February 2010, the municipality granted NOK 62,500 for Air Norway to run a television commercial during the semi-final of Melodi Grand Prix.
