= GuardAir =

Norwegian airline, 1992–2001

IATA	ICAO	Call sign
FB	JAP	Guard-Air
- Founded: 1992
- Ceased operations: 2 April 2001
- Operating bases: Bodø Airport; Sandefjord Airport, Torp; Skien Airport, Geiteryggen
- Fleet size: 4 (2001)
- Destinations: 8 (2001)
- Headquarters: Sandefjord

GuardAir AS was a Norwegian airline which operated between 1992 and 2001. Based at Sandefjord Airport, Torp, it operated four Dornier 228s and served eight scheduled destinations in 2001.

The airline was established with a Cessna 210 to search for stolen vehicles. After merging with Wing-Tech in 1997, the airline procured a Dornier 228 and started flying newspapers. Its first scheduled service connected Skien with Oslo, but lasted only year after the October 1998 start-up. The airline then flew flights from Sandefjord to Ålesund, Kristiansund and an international route to Gothenburg. GuardAir won a government contract to fly to Røst and Fagernes from 2000. Finally the airline established a route from Trondheim to Ålesund and Kristiansund. The airline lost an accumulated 30 million kr and filed for bankruptcy on 2 April 2001.

== History ==
The airline was founded in 1992 by Einar Rønnestad, initially operating out of Sandefjord Airport, Torp. GuardAir started with a Cessna 210 that it operated for the insurance company Storebrand to find stolen cars and boats. The company bought a Piper PA-31 Navajo in 1995. It merged with Wing-Tech in 1997, making Bjørn Wasler a co-owner. An important contract was signed with the newspapers Aftenposten, Bergens Tidende and Stavanger Aftenblad to fly them each night. This was done with a triangular services from Oslo Airport, Gardermoen to Bergen Airport, Flesland and Stavanger Airport, Sola before returning to Oslo. This route led to the procurement of a Dornier 228 in September 1997. Soon a second Dornier was needed for the traffic.

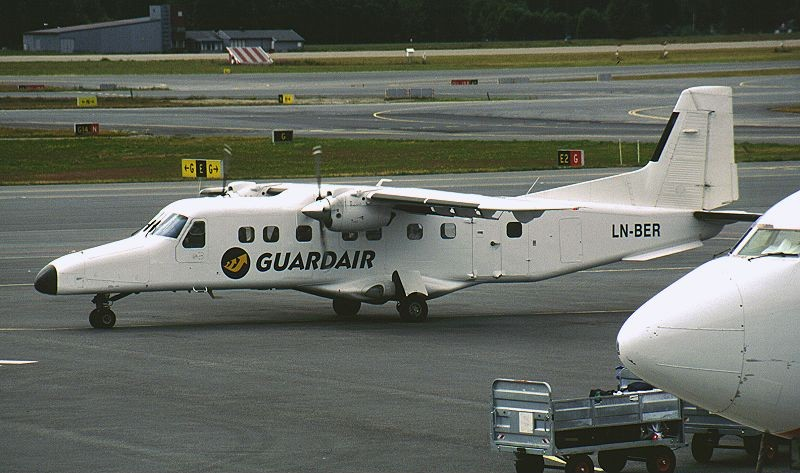
Guardair Dornier 228 at Oslo Airport, Gardermoen in 2000

By 1998 the Bergen-based shipping owner Bjarne Rieber had bought a third of the airline. Oslo's main airport was moved from Fornebu to Gardermoen on 8 October 1998. This caused the driving time to the main airport from among other places Grenland to increase by about an hour. GuardAir was one of two airlines which believed that the distance was sufficient to allow for a feeder air route out of Skien Airport, Geiterygen. Both GuardAir and Teddy Air launched their services on 25 October, with GuardAir flying three round trips daily with a Dornier 228. Teddy Air operated an Embraer 110 and had nearly the same departure times. Within a month Teddy Air had withdrawn from the Oslo route.

Starting in 1999 also introduced scheduled flights out of Sandefjord. This consisted of a triangular route to Ålesund Airport, Vigra and Kristiansund Airport, Kvernberget, as well as an international service to Göteborg Landvetter Airport. Stein Matre bought part of the company in 2000, and decided to bid for some of the public service obligations that were being auctioned away by the Ministry of Transport and Communications. The company was awarded two routes, from Bodø Airport to Røst Airport, and from Oslo Airport, Gardermoen to Fagernes Airport, Leirin, taking effect from 1 April 2000. The Røst route resulted in the company having to establish a base at Røst Airport. Starting in November 2000, GuardAir started flights from Trondheim Airport, Værnes to Kristiansund and Ålesund, with one daily service.

By 2001 the airline was operating four Dornier 228s. The rapid expansion caused increasing financial problems for the airline. Few of the routes were profitable, and especially the Gothenburg route ran with a heavy loss. It was therefore terminated in early 2001. The new base at Bodø Airport and leasing of additional aircraft also added to the financial strain. By March the airline stated that it needed to refinance of 20 million kroner or carry out a merger. The company filed for bankruptcy on 2 April 2001 after the company had lost 30 million kroner.

== Destinations ==
The following destinations were served by GuardAir as scheduled services.

Kato Airline destinations
Location	Airport	Start	End	Ref(s)
Ålesund	Ålesund Airport, Vigra	1999	2001	
Bodø	Bodø Airport	2000	2001	
Fagernes	Fagernes Airport, Leirin	2000	2001	
Gothenburg	Göteborg Landvetter Airport	2000	2001	
Kristiansund	Kristiansund Airport, Kvernberget	1999	2001	
Oslo	Oslo Airport, Gardermoen	1998	1999	
Røst	Røst Airport	2000	2001	
Sandefjord	Sandefjord Airport, Torp	1999	2001	
Skien	Skien Airport, Geiteryggen	1998	1999	
Trondheim	Trondheim Airport, Værnes	2000	2001	

== Bibliography ==
- Hagby, Kay (1998). Fra Nielsen & Winther til Boeing 747 (in Norwegian). Drammen: Hagby. ISBN 8299475201.
- Tjomsland, Audun (2005). Høyt spill om Torp (in Norwegian). Sandefjord: Tjomsland Media. p. 216. ISBN 82-997212-0-2.
