= Ørland Airport =

Ørland Airport Ørland lufthavn
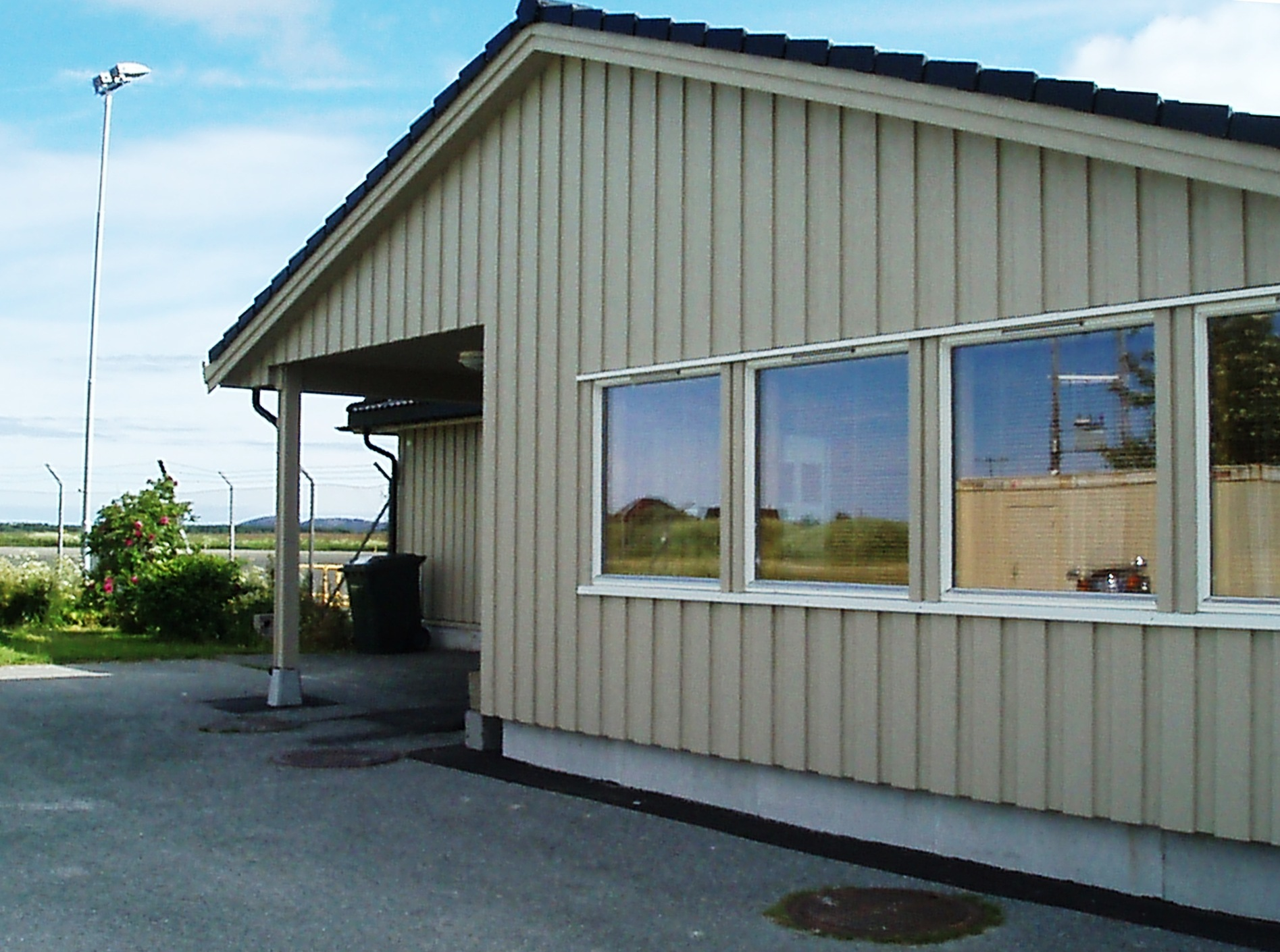
- IATA: OLA; ICAO: ENOL

Summary
- Airport type: Joint (public and military)
- Owner: Royal Norwegian Air Force
- Operator: Ørland Municipality
- Serves: Ørland Municipality, Norway
- Location: Brekstad, Ørland Municipality
- Elevation AMSL: 9 m (30 ft)
- Coordinates: 63°41′57″N 009°36′14″E
- Website: Official website

Map
- Location within Norway

Runways
Direction	Length		Surface
Direction	m	ft	Surface
15/33	3,278	8,904	Asphalt

Statistics (2014)
- Passengers: 5,546
- Aircraft movements: 1,462
- Cargo (tonnes): 0

Ørland Airport (Norwegian: Ørland lufthavn; IATA: OLA, ICAO: ENOL), also known as Ørland Airport, Brekstad (Ørland lufthavn, Brekstad) is the civilian sector of the Ørland Main Air Station. It is located 1.5 km (0.8 NM) northwest of the town of Brekstad, in Ørland Municipality in Trøndelag county, Norway. The civilian sector is municipal, although the runway, air traffic control and rescue services are operated by the Royal Norwegian Air Force.

The airport terminal, which has a capacity for 50 simultaneous passengers, was built in 1978 and renovated in 2007. It is served by Air Norway, operated by North Flying, with a daily round trip to Oslo and a weekly service to Aalborg. Ørland is the main airport for the district of Fosen, and it is located close enough to the city of Trondheim that Ryanair has considered it as a secondary airport. A car ferry must be used to reach the airport from Trondheim. The airport served 5,546 passengers in 2014.

== History ==
Planning of an airfield at Ørland was started in January 1941 and the decision was announced by the Wehrmacht on 22 April 1941. Within ten days work on expropriation for 45 landowners started. The airport was planned to have a 1,600 by 120 meters (5,250 by 390 ft) runway, although this had been lengthened to 2,000 meters (6,600 ft) by the time the runway was completed in late 1941. The runway was aligned roughly east–west at 228.4 degrees and made of wood. Construction of a second, 1,600 by 50 meters (5,250 by 160 ft) concrete runway commenced in 1942. This work took much longer time and was not completed until mid 1944. This runway is part of the northern end of the current runway. A third runway was also planned, but no more than some leveling had been completed by the end of the war in April 1945.

Within days the airport had been taken over by the Royal Air Force. The air station was officially taken over by the RNoAF on 2 November 1945. Funding to upgrade the airport were dropped in 1946, but the air force continued to work with expansion proposals. Ørland saw a limited amount of civilian traffic. The first route was established by Trøndelag Flyveselskap in 1949, which operated a route to Trondheim Airport, Lade using a three-seat Auster. The route was quickly terminated.

The decision to upgrade the airport was taken in 1950, following the decision that Norway would receive the F-84 Thunderjet through the Marshall Plan. They required a much longer runway than the existing de Havilland Vampires and the air force wanted to have one airport with sufficient runway length for them in each of its regions. For Central Norway the air force therefore decided to upgrade Ørland's main runway to 2,700 by 50 meters (8,860 by 160 ft). Construction started in April 1952 and was completed in June 1952. Work then started on the parallel 2,600-by-25-meter (8,530 by 82 ft) runway, which was completed in November. The initial investment program for the airport concluded in July 1954 with the completion of a fire station. The air force and its 332 Squadron started using the airport on 31 May 1954.

During the early 1950s, Widerøe and Polarfly would occasionally use the airfield for air ambulance services. Scandinavian Airlines System received permission on 3 March 1953 to use Ørlandet as an alternative airfield for its route to Northern Norway; the permission was expanded to also include their North Pole route to Los Angeles. In the course of ten years this resulted in six or seven landings. From 1958 to 1962 a direct cargo route with crabs and fish was established between Ørlandet and Stockholm, using a Lockheed Model 18 Lodestar.

Braathens SAFE introduced a summer scheduled service from Ørland to Trondheim Airport, Værnes in 1967, but there were not sufficient passengers to reintroduce it the following year. The Værnes route was reopened by Widerøe in 1971. A small cabin was at first used as a passenger terminal, but a larger terminal building was completed in 1978. This resulted in the airport's historical peak level of service, with four daily services. An early morning and late evening flight were provided to Værnes, where there was possibilities to transfer to north- and south-bound flights. Two more services were provided by flights which connected to the airports in Helgeland and Western Norway. The military enforced strict restrictions on civilian traffic until 1985, when the airport received national airport status.

This resulted in a further expansion of the civilian section, especially the size of the apron. During mid-1986 the runway at Værnes was to be replaced and Ørland was used as a substitute. At the same time Ørland Municipality hoped to establish a heliport at Ørland to serve oil fields in Haltenbanken, but this was instead located to Kristiansund Airport, Kvernberget. Widerøe had throughout the 1980s been reducing its activity at Ørland and terminated its last flights in 1987. Norving chose to start four daily services, but they were forced to close them later the same year. The municipality started a push to establish a new airline at the airport. Valdresfly established a route to Værnes in 1994, but was forced to close the following year. With the opening of Oslo Airport, Gardermoen in 1998, both Valdresfly and Heli-Trans wanted to fly the route, and the municipality chose Heli-Trans. The route started on 15 April 1998, but was closed in October.

In 2001, low-cost carrier Ryanair announced that they were considering to open a route from Ørland to London. Ryanair stated that the fees charged at Trondheim Airport, Værnes was too high for them, and the municipality stated that they were willing to stretch themselves far on low landing fees to attract Ryanair. Ryanair was already serving the Oslo area from Sandefjord Airport, Torp, which is a military air station which has been converted to a low-cost airport. If started, they initially planned daily flights to London Stansted Airport. In September 2002, the municipality and Ryanair signed an agreement, which, if activated, would start Ryanair flights to Brekstad. However, because the airport had insufficient infrastructure, a new terminal building would need to be built. Investments were estimated at NOK 17 million and public transport to the airport would be provided using fast ferries. In March 2003, Ryanair announced that they would not start services to Ørland. Mayor Knut Morten Ring (Labor) stated that the municipality would continue to plan a new terminal, and would, if necessary, built a temporary terminal to attract the airlines.

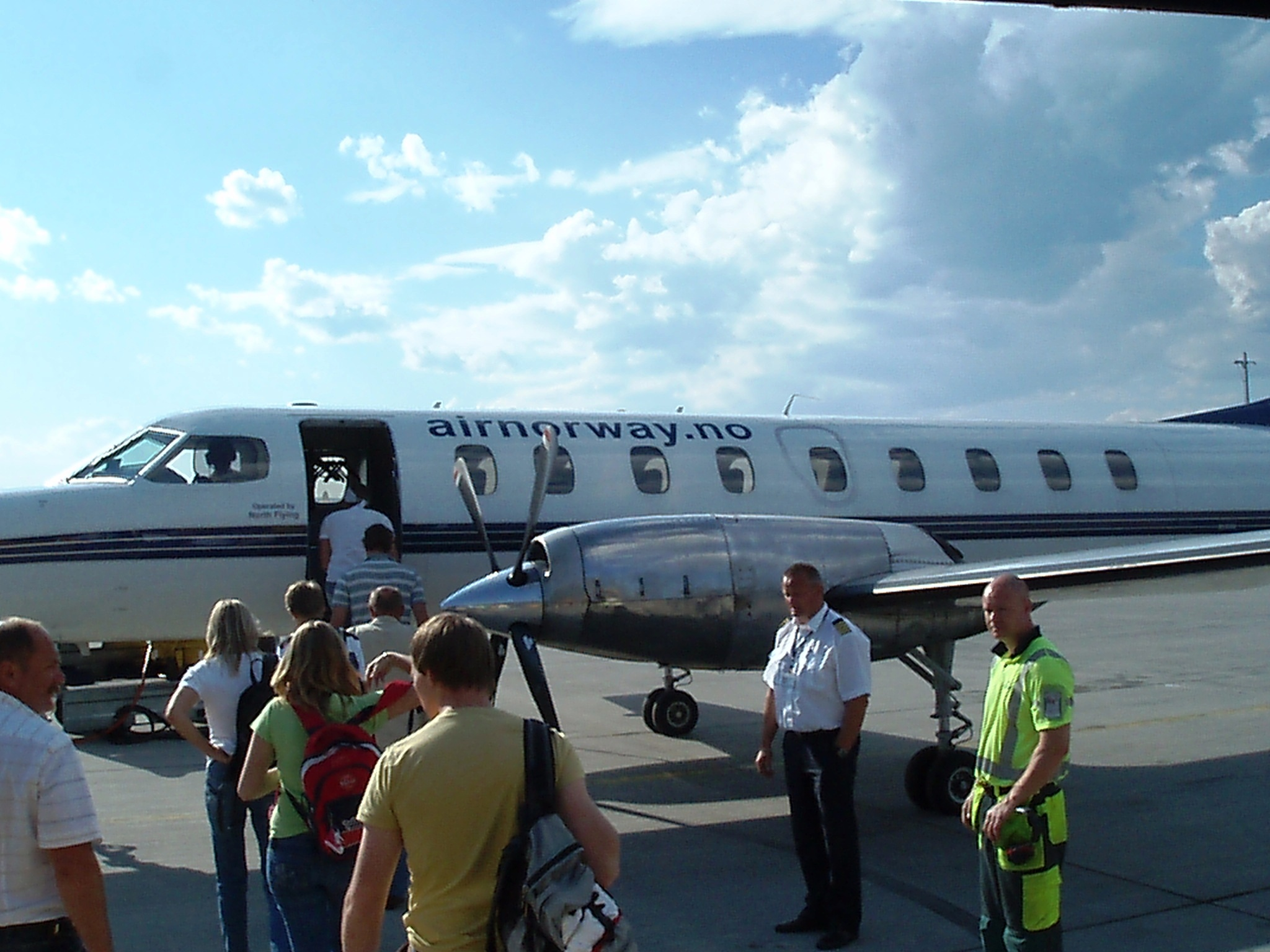
Passengers boarding an Air Norway Fairchild Metro at Ørland Airport

Air Norway commenced scheduled services from Brekstad to Oslo on 23 May 2003. From 31 January 2004, they included a weekly service to Aalborg. In 2004, the Russian airline Aeroflot was considering flying fish from Ørland to Japan, but the plans were rejected by the Norwegian Air Force. In 2006, Air Norway experienced a 40% passenger growth, and from 6 September, they also introduced services on Wednesday.

When the European Union introduced new security rules for airports from 1 January 2005, Brekstad Airport was exempt, because of the small size of the aircraft. By April, the airport had received notice that 100% security control would still have to be introduced, costing the municipality 465,000 kr per year. At the same time, Air Norway was still losing money, and applied to the municipality to not be charged landing fees at the airport. On 3 September 2007, the terminal was renovated for NOK 1.8 million. It received a segregation of arriving and departing passengers, 100% security control and a general renovation of the building, although the capacity was not increased. In 2009, Air Norway lost 1,300 passengers after the Norwegian Air Force decided to not permit their employees to travel from Brekstad, but instead have to take cheaper flights from Trondheim, located about two hours drive away. The reduction in ridership, along with a strengthening of the Danish krone in relation to the Norwegian, caused Air Norway to have lost NOK 100,000 by August 2009. The mayor of Ørland stated at that he was working to make the route receive state grants as a public service obligation.

After Ørland Airport was left with no scheduled flights as Air Leap ceased operations to Oslo on January 24, 2022, DAT Danish Air Transport started a domestic service to Harstad/Narvik once a week commencing July 5, 2022.

DAT Danish Air Transport had their first flight on the new Oslo route on the 1st. March.

== Airlines and destinations ==
The following airlines operate regular scheduled and charter flights at Ørland Airport:

Airlines	Destinations
DAT	Harstad/Narvik, Oslo, Stord

== Facilities ==
The airport resides at an elevation of 28 feet (9 m) above mean sea level. It has one runway designated 15/33 with an asphalt surface measuring 2,714 by 45 metres (8,904 ft × 148 ft). The terminal has a capacity for up to 50 people per flight. Ørland is an international airport with customs and border controls. Six people work at the airport, including three security personnel and three ground handling personnel. The operation costs the municipality NOK 680,000 per year, although Air Norway is exempt from paying any airport taxes.

The airport is located a few minutes drive (5 kilometres (3.1 mi)) outside Brekstad. It is 55 minutes by fast ferry from Brekstad to Trondheim, and two hours drive, 106 kilometres (66 mi), including a ferry. By fast ferry, Brekstad is two and a half hours from Kristiansund, and about one hours drive from Orkanger. The airport is a reserve for Trondheim Airport, Værnes, and international carriers such as KLM land at Ørland when the Trondheim Airport in Værnes has to close.

== Bibliography ==
- Hovd, Rune (2004). Ørland hovedflystasjon: Okkupasjon – Kald krig – Ny tid – Lokalsamfunn (in Norwegian). Ørland: Ørland Main Air Station.
