= DAT LT =

Lithuanian airline

IATA	ICAO	Call sign
R6	DNU	DANU
- Founded: 2003 as DOT LT
- Operating bases: Kaunas
- Fleet size: 6
- Parent company: DAT
- Headquarters: Karmėlava, Lithuania
- Website: dat.dk

DAT LT, formerly named DOT LT, is a Danish-owned Lithuanian airline, that offers worldwide ACMI services using a small fleet of passenger aircraft. It is a subsidiary of Danish DAT.

== History ==
The airline was established and started operations in 2003 as Danu Oro Transportas with assistance from its majority shareholder DAT Danish Air Transport. On 13 April 2006, it was rebranded as DOT LT, and in 2019 as DAT LT. The company had 60 employees as of February 2010 and is a member of the European Regions Airline Association. and IATA from 2024.

== Destinations ==
DAT LT no longer operate scheduled services. The fleet is leased out and operate scheduled flights on behalf of DAT. Following scheduled services was operated under DOT LT brand and codes.

Country	City	Airport	Notes	Refs
Denmark	Billund	Billund Airport	Terminated	
Lithuania	Kaunas	Kaunas Airport	Terminated	
Lithuania	Palanga	Palanga International Airport	Terminated	
Norway	Fagernes	Fagernes Airport, Leirin	Terminated	
Norway	Oslo	Oslo Airport, Gardermoen	Terminated	
Norway	Røros	Røros Airport	Terminated	

== Fleet ==
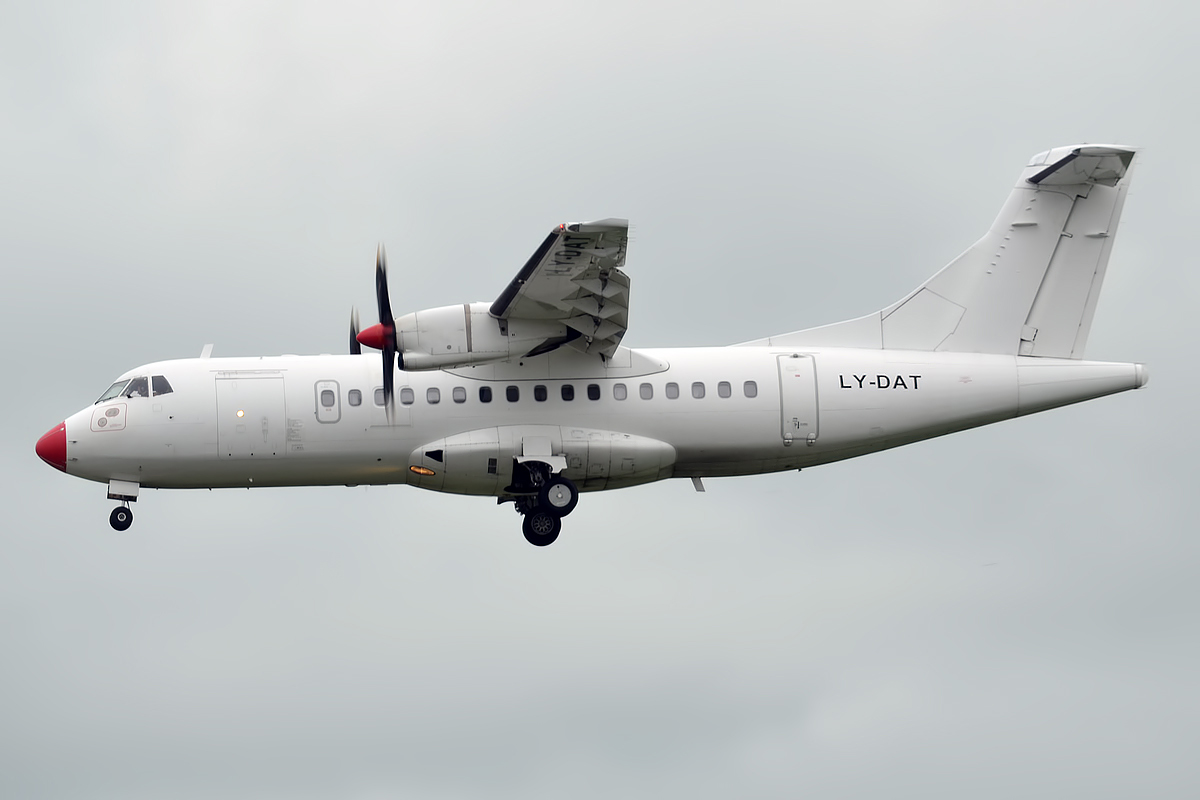
DAT LT ATR 42-500

=== Current fleet ===
As of January 2025, the DAT LT fleet consists of the following aircraft:

Aircraft	In service	Orders	Passengers	Notes
Airbus A320-200	5	—	180	
Airbus A321-200	1	—	194	
ATR 72-600	2	—	72	
ATR 72-500	2	—	70	
ATR 72-200	4	—	68	
ATR 42-500	4	—	48	
ATR 42-300	4	—	48	
Total	22	—		

=== Former fleet ===
The airline previously operated the following aircraft types (as of August 2017):

- ATR 42-300
- ATR 72-200
- Saab 340A

== Incidents ==
- On 8 August 2010, a DOT LT ATR 42-300 (registered LY-DOT) that was parked at Pori Airport in Finland was hit by a small tornado and lifted into the air. The aircraft was damaged beyond economical repair when it slammed back onto the ground.
