= DAT (airline) =

Danish airline

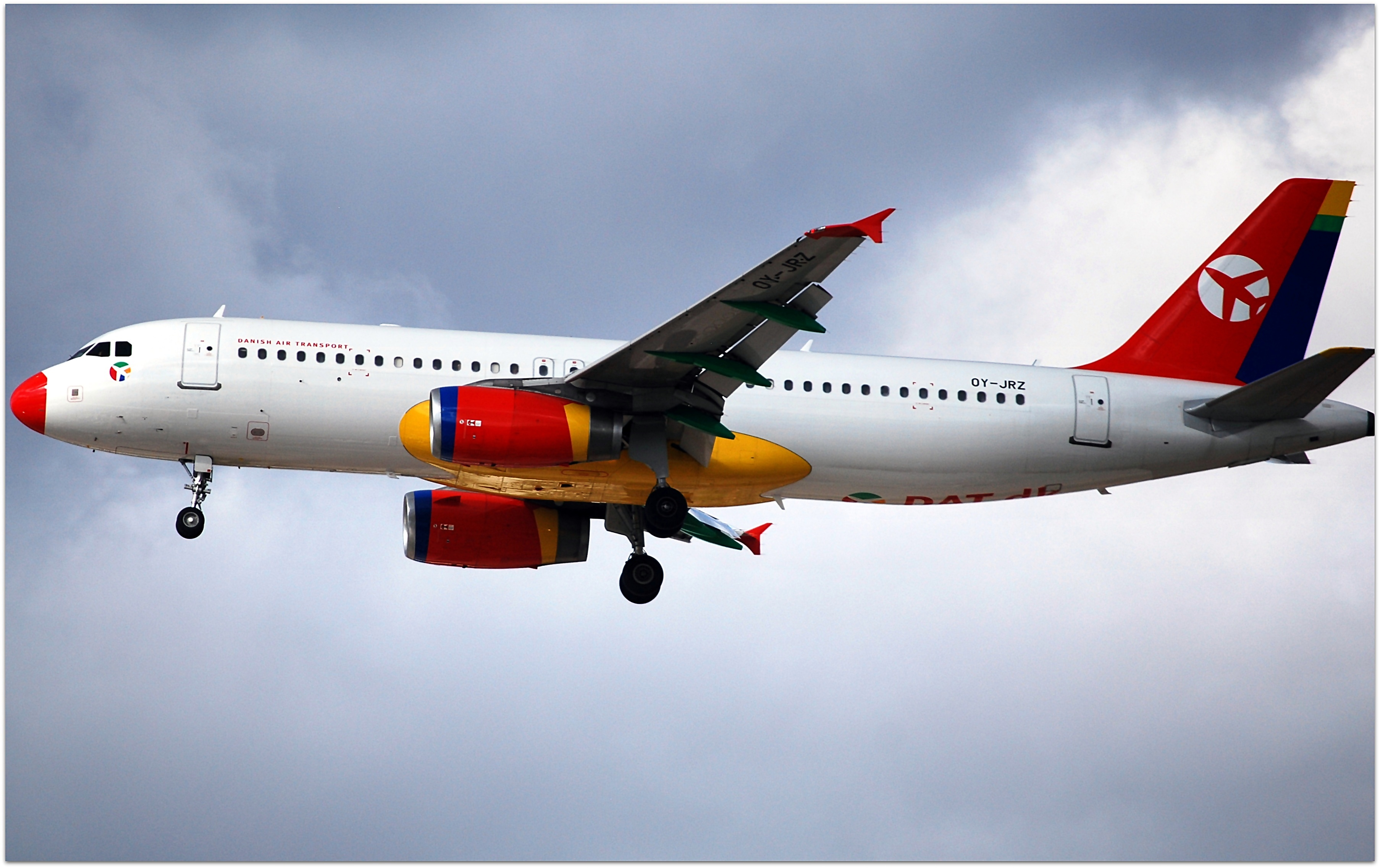
- Airbus A320-200
IATA	ICAO	Call sign
DX	DTR	DANISH
- Founded: 1989
- AOC #: DK.AOC.043
- Hubs: Copenhagen Airport
- Focus cities: Bornholm Airport
- Subsidiaries: DAT LT; Nordic Regional Airlines (60%)
- Fleet size: 23
- Destinations: 27
- Headquarters: Vamdrup, Denmark
- Key people: Jesper Rungholm, President
- Website: dat.dk

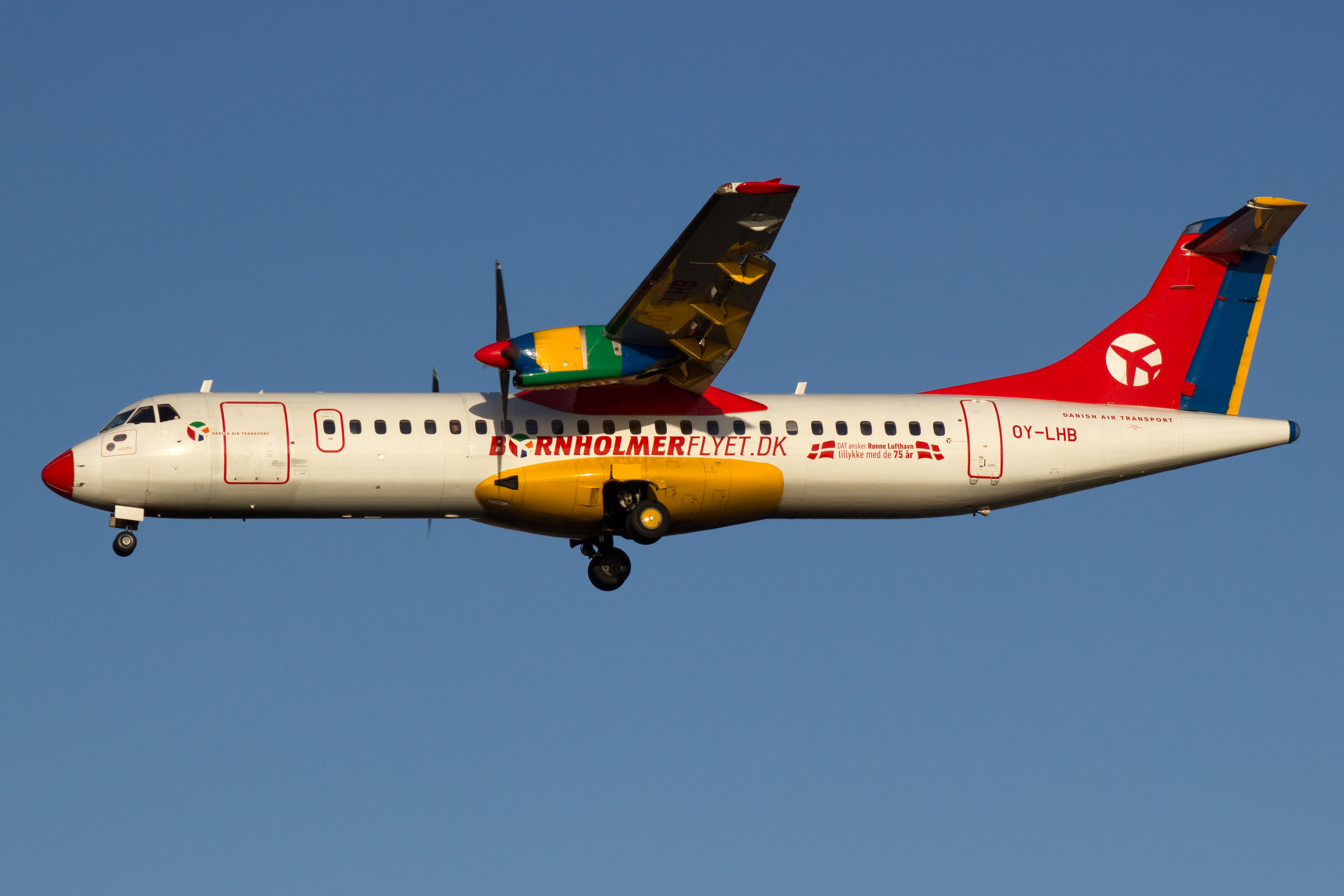
ATR 72-200

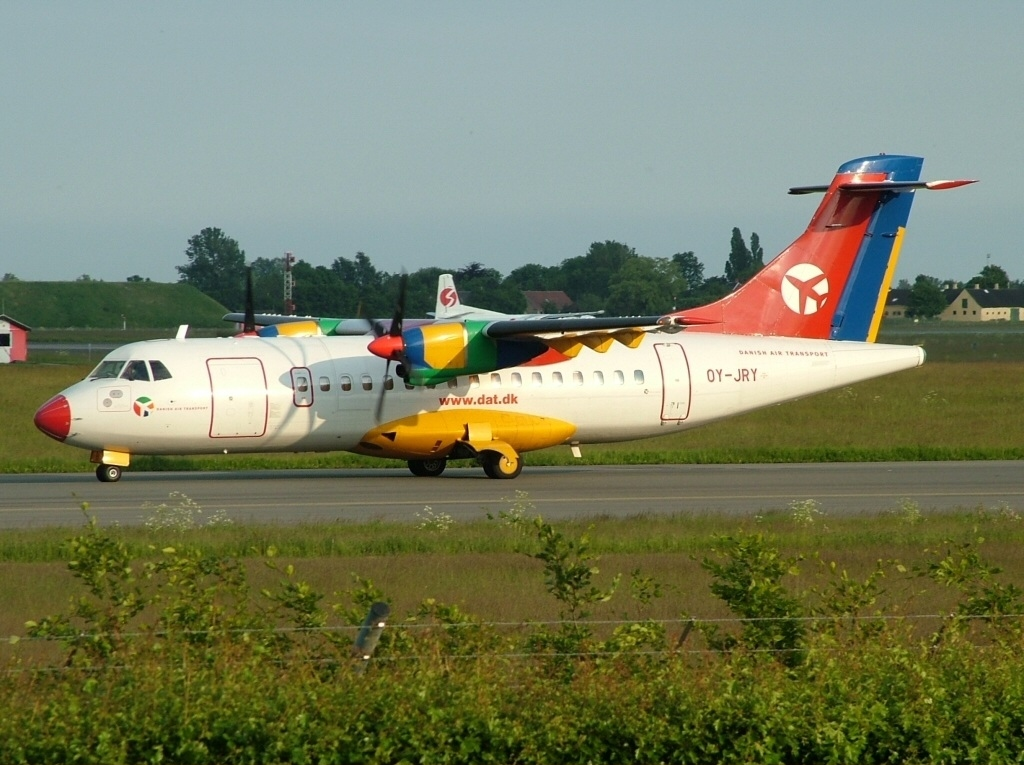
ATR 42-300

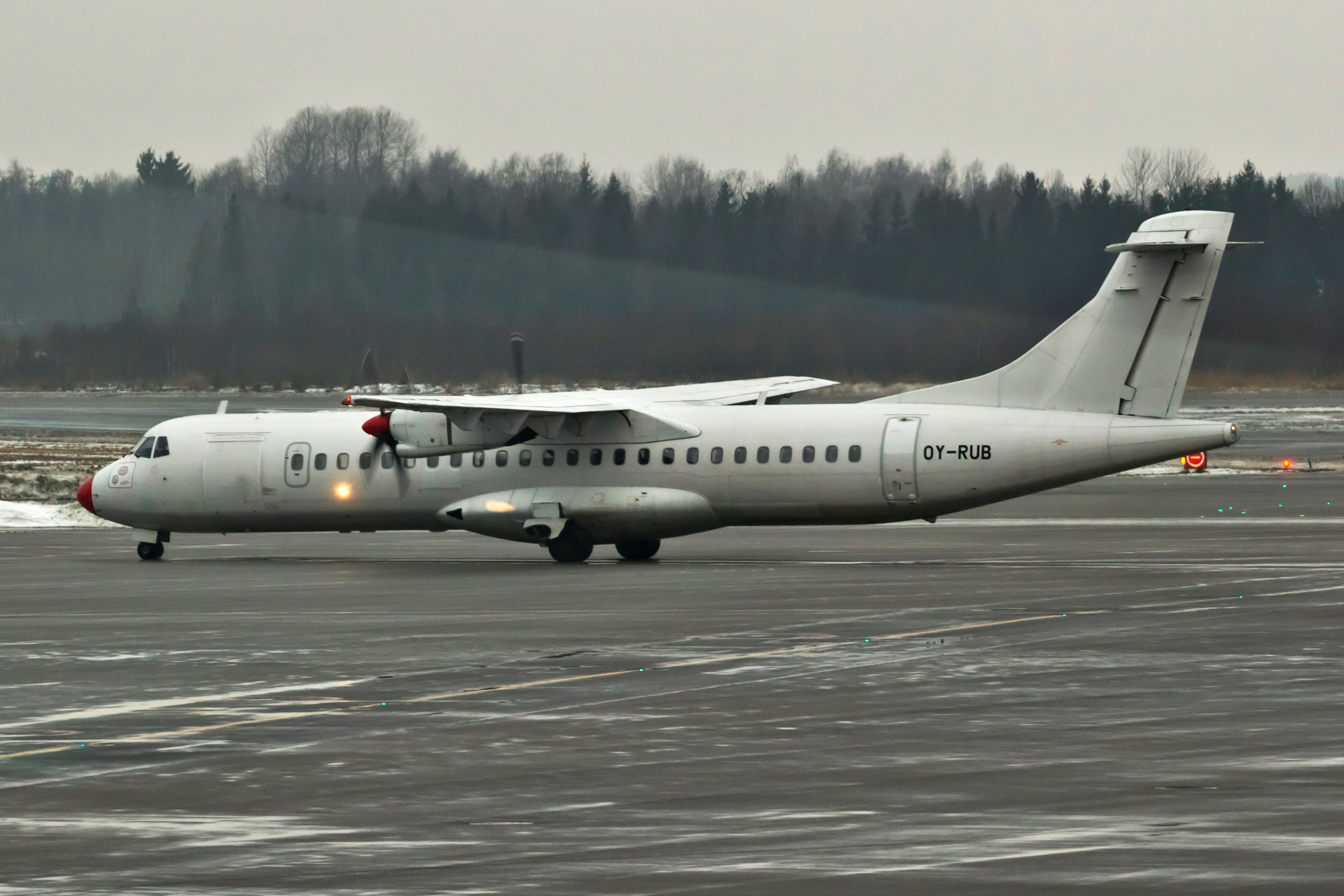
ATR 72-200 operated in Italy wearing an all-white livery

DAT A/S, formerly named Danish Air Transport, is a Danish airline headquartered in Vamdrup, Kolding Municipality, operating scheduled and chartered passenger flights mainly from airports in Denmark, Norway, Italy and Germany.

== History ==
The airline was founded as Danish Air Transport in 1989 and started operations in that same year, initially as a cargo airline. Soon special flights like the transport of live horses or supplies for the Paris Dakar Rally in Africa were carried out, too. Passenger charter flights were added in 1994, with the subsequent launch of scheduled services on 18 November, 1996.

Since 2003, DAT also owns DAT LT which operates under its own Lithuanian AOC. Prior to 2020, the airline changed its legal name and brand from Danish Air Transport to the abbreviated DAT.

In September 2021, DAT removed their one remaining McDonnell Douglas MD-83 which was the last aircraft of its type operated in Europe.

Currently, the airline only operates flights to Scandinavia and European countries including Italy and Germany.

== Operations in Italy ==
Since July 1, 2018, DAT has been responsible, under a public service obligation, for scheduled air services from and to the Sicilian islands of Pantelleria and Lampedusa. These services are operated under Voli di Sicilia brand. The contract, initially valid until June 30, 2021, was subsequently extended until March 31, 2026.

From June 28, 2019, until September 8, 2019, DAT operated a direct twice-weekly Catania-Olbia flight with an ATR 72-200 twin-engined aircraft. Finally, starting November 3, 2025, it was entrusted with the flights from Ancona to Rome Fiumicino and Milan Linate airports. These flights are operated under Voli delle Marche brand.

== Destinations ==
This is a list of destinations operated by DAT (passenger flights) as of March 2026:

Country	City	Airport	Notes
Austria
Austria	Linz	Linz Airport	
Denmark
Denmark	Aalborg	Aalborg Airport	
Denmark	Billund	Billund Airport	
Denmark	Bornholm	Bornholm Airport	Base
Denmark	Copenhagen	Copenhagen Airport	
Germany
Germany	Berlin	Berlin Brandenburg Airport	
Germany	Frankfurt	Frankfurt Airport	
Germany	Hamburg	Hamburg Airport	
Germany	Saarbrücken	Saarbrücken Airport	Base
Italy
Italy	Ancona	Marche Airport	Base
Italy	Catania	Catania–Fontanarossa Airport	
Italy	Lampedusa	Lampedusa Airport	
Italy	Milan	Milan Linate Airport	
Italy	Palermo	Palermo Airport	Base
Italy	Pantelleria	Pantelleria Airport	
Italy	Rome	Rome Fiumicino Airport	
Italy	Trapani	Trapani–Birgi Airport	
Norway
Norway	Evenes	Harstad/Narvik Airport	
Norway	Florø	Florø Airport	
Norway	Ørland	Ørland Airport	
Norway	Oslo	Oslo Airport, Gardermoen	Base
Norway	Røros	Røros Airport	
Norway	Stord	Stord Airport	

=== Codeshare agreements ===
DAT has codeshare agreements with the following airlines:

- Lufthansa

=== Interline agreements ===
DAT has interline agreements with the following airlines:

- Air Greenland
- Emirates
- Finnair
- ITA Airways
- Qatar Airways
- Scandinavian Airlines
- Widerøe

== Fleet ==
As of January 2025, the DAT fleet consists of the following aircraft:

Aircraft	In service	Orders	Passengers	Notes
Airbus A320-200	5	—	180	
Airbus A321-200	1	—	198	
ATR 42-300	4	—	46	
ATR 42-500	5	—	48	
ATR 42-500	5	—	50	
ATR 72-200	4	—	66	
ATR 72-200	4	—	70	
ATR 72-600	4	—	72	
Total	23	—		

=== Retired fleet ===
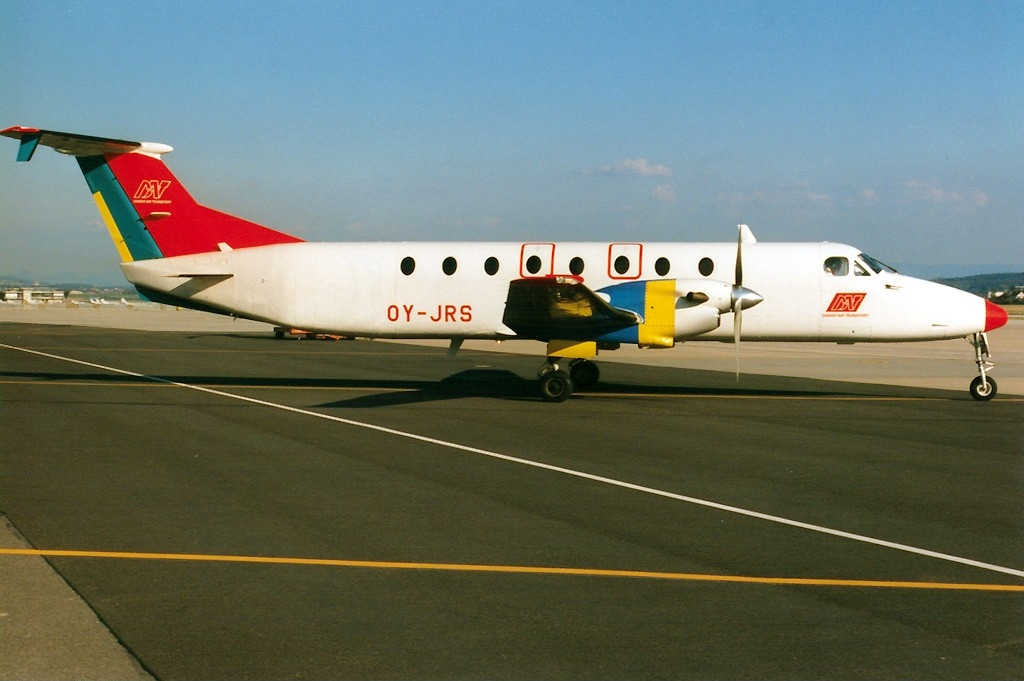
Beech 1900C

Aircraft	Total	Introduced	Retired	Notes
Beech 1900C				
Dash 8	3	2011	2014	
McDonnell Douglas MD-82	3	2018	2021	
McDonnell Douglas MD-83	1	2010	2021	
McDonnell Douglas MD-87	1	2009	2015	
Total	8	—		
