= Værnes Air Station =

Værnes Air Station Værnes flystasjon
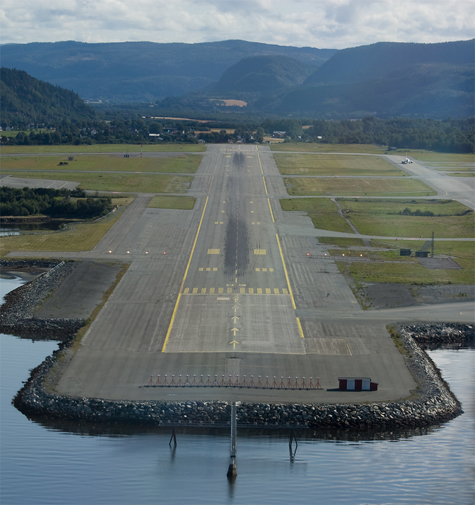
- IATA: TRD; ICAO: ENVA

Summary
- Airport type: Joint
- Operator: Royal Norwegian Air Force
- Location: Stjørdal, Norway
- Elevation AMSL: 17 m / 56 ft
- Coordinates: 63°27′27″N 010°55′27″E
- Website: Official website
- Interactive map of Værnes Air Station

Runways
Direction	Length		Surface
Direction	m	ft	Surface
09/27	2,759	9,052	Asphalt
14/32	1,472	4,829	Asphalt/concrete
~~18/36~~	~~1,275~~	~~4,183~~	~~Concrete~~
- Source: Norwegian AIP at Eurocontrol

Værnes Air Station (/ˈvɛəɹnɛs/) (Norwegian: Værnes flystasjon) is an air station of the Royal Norwegian Air Force located in Stjørdal Municipality in Trøndelag county, Norway. It is co-located with Trondheim Airport, Værnes, which is owned and operated by Avinor. As an air station, the aerodrome is primarily used for the Marine Corps Preposition Program Norway, which involves the United States armed forces stationing equipment at Værnes and other facilities in the Trondheim region of central Norway. The Værnes military installations contain place for up to six aircraft of the size of a C-5 Galaxy and barracks to house 1,200 soldiers. It also serves the Home Guard, including its training center and the headquarters of the Trøndelag District (HV-12). Formerly, the air force's pilot school was located at Værnes.

== Facilities ==
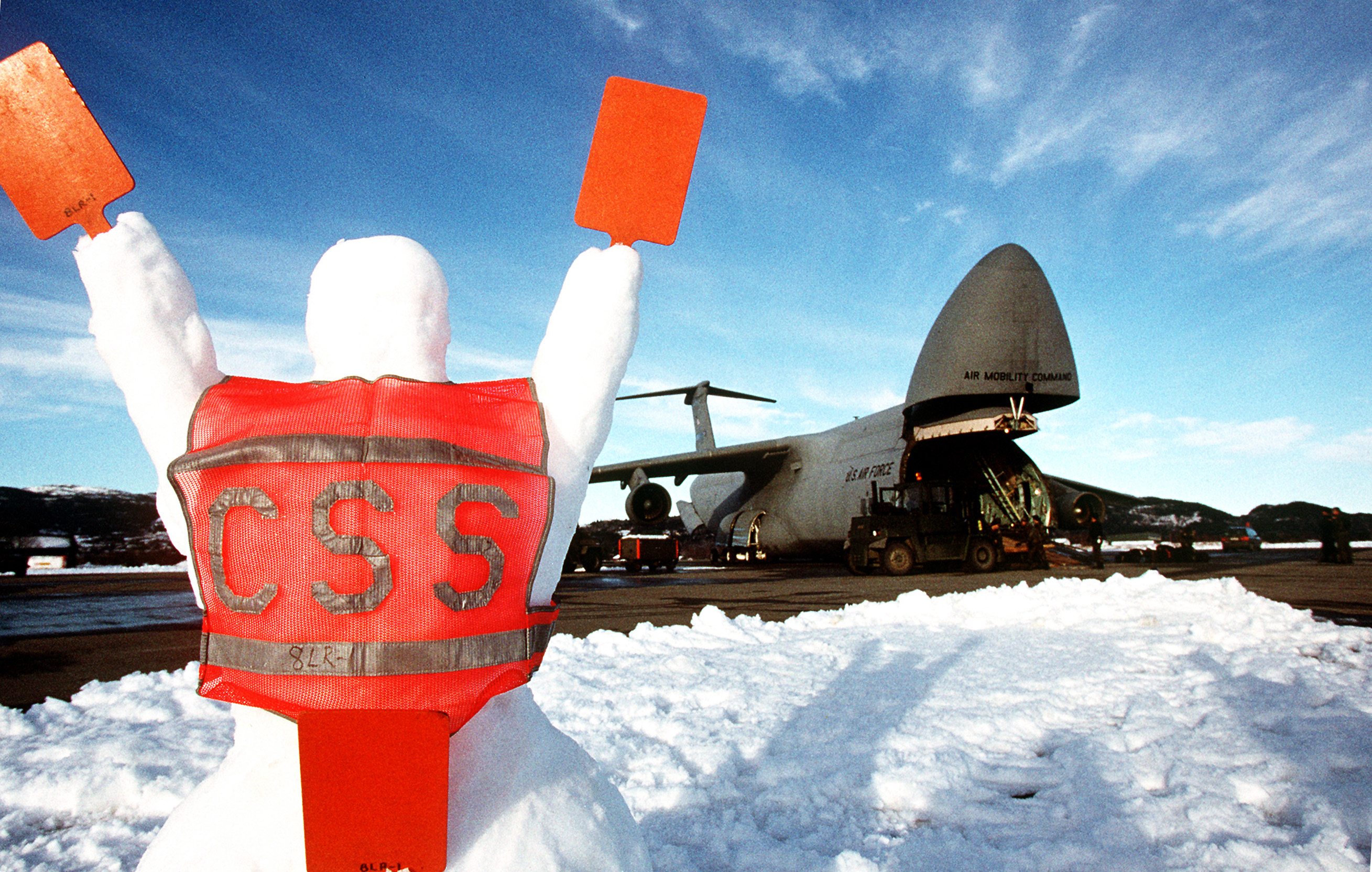
A United States Air Force C-5 Galaxy unloading cargo at Værnes Air Station

Værnes Air Station is one of two air stations in Central Norway, the other being Ørland Main Air Station. There are no aircraft permanently stationed at Værnes, but the station serves the Home Guard, including its training center and the headquarters of the Trøndelag District (HV-12). Most of the military installations are located on the north side of the runway, although some are also located on the south side, to the east of the civilian terminal. Værnes also serves as a storage base for the United States armed forces as part of the Marine Corps Prepositioning Program-Norway. The military owns the runways and taxiways, but these are operated by Avinor. Three to four hundred military aircraft are handled at the air station each year. The military installations contain place for up to six aircraft of the size of a C-5 Galaxy and barracks to house 1,200 soldiers. The Ring Road connects the northern and southern installations and passes past the main runway on the east side.

The main runway is 2,759 metres (9,052 ft) long, and runs east–west at 09/27. It is 45 metres (148 ft) wide, plus shoulders of 7.5 metres (25 ft) on each side. The runway is equipped with instrument landing system category 1. The main radar, a combined primary and secondary, is placed at Vennafjell, 9 nautical miles (17 km; 10 mi) south of the airport. Other radars are located at Kopparen, Tronfjell and Gråkallen. The taxiway runs the parallel the full length of the main runway. It is 23 metres (75 ft) wide, with 7.5 metres (25 ft) wide shoulders on each side. The center-distance between the runway and taxiway is 184 metres (604 ft), allowing simultaneous use by code E aircraft (such as a Boeing 747). Værnes has a theoretical capacity of 40 air movements per hour, with a registered capacity of 25.

The airport also has a diagonal runway, which runs 14/32, roughly northwest–southeast. It is 1,035 metres (3,396 ft) long, plus end section of 293 metres (961 ft) on Runway 14 and 126 metres (413 ft) on Runway 32. The runway is closed for traffic, in part because of bad asphalt quality.

== History ==
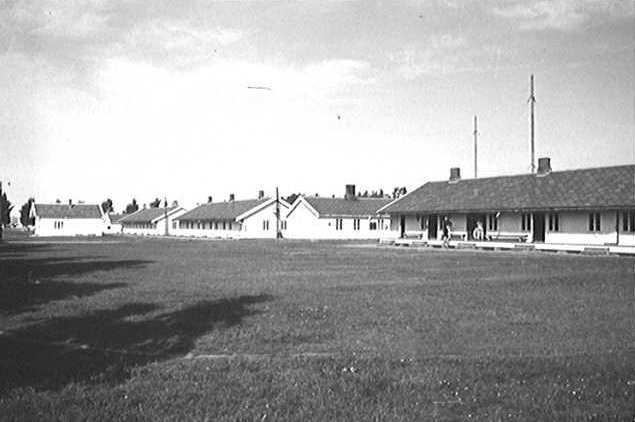
Værnes in 1936

Værnes is first recorded in the 10th century as the seat for one of eight chieftains of Trøndelag. The first military activity in the area was as a base for leidang. After the Viking Age, the farm at Værnes was taken over by the king and became the seat of the vogt. From 1671, the farm was owned by a series of military officers and public servants. In 1887, the farm was bought by the Royal Norwegian Army and converted to a camp. The first aircraft to use Værnes was a military Farman MF.7 Longhorn, which took off on 26 March 1914. It was part of the plan to establish the Norwegian Army Air Service, for which Værnes was chosen as the initial station for Central Norway. Radio equipment was installed in 1919 and the first hangar was built in 1920. By 1922 the grass field serving as runway has become insufficient for newer planes, both in terms of length and level, but this was not performed until 1925. In 1927, parliament passed legislation to move the division to Rinnleiret from 1930, but this was later annulled. With the delivery of Fokker aircraft in 1930, the runway was again upgraded and extended.

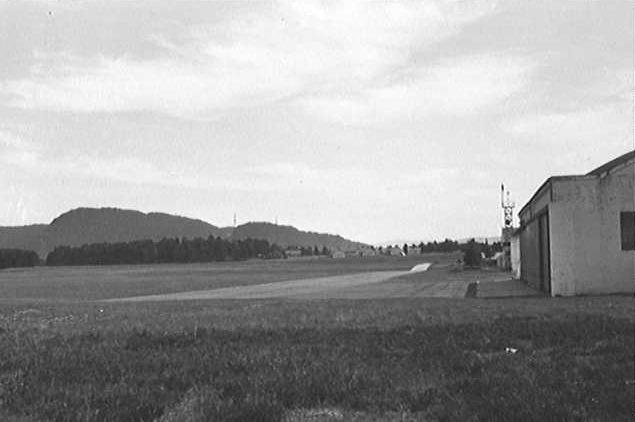
Værnes in 1936

Værnes was surrendered to Luftwaffe on 9 April 1940, during the German occupation of Norway. On 24 April, 350 civilians started construction at Værnes, and within a few days 2,000 people were hired. On 28 April, a new 800 metres (2,600 ft) wooden runway was completed. The expansion was part of the plans for Festung Norwegen and was used as a bomber base for attacks on Northern Norway, and by May there were 200 aircraft stationed at Værnes. During the war, particularly in April 1940, the airport was subject to several bombings from the Royal Air Force. In June, work was started to clear the forests near the airport, and graves from the Viking Age were found. Construction was halted for several weeks while German and Norwegian archaeologists conducted research. In July, work started on building concrete runways, and by 1942 all three runways were finished. The east–west was made 1,620 metres (5,310 ft) long, the north–south was made 1,300 metres (4,300 ft) while the northwest–southeast was made 1,275 metres (4,183 ft) long. A number of taxiways were also constructed. A branch line of the railway was built to the hangars. By 1945, Luftwaffe had built about 100 buildings at Værnes. The land expropriated was estimated at between 1.6 and 3.0 square kilometres (0.62 and 1.16 sq mi). The Germans had also finished the control tower that had been under construction in 1940.

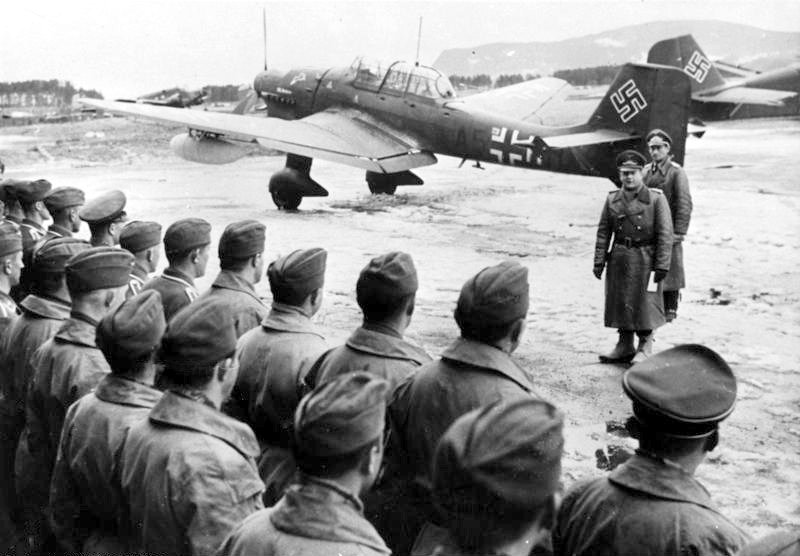
Erhard Milch visits Luftwaffe troops on 23 April 1940

After the war ended, the airport was initial taken over by the Royal Air Force, but they soon withdrew leaving the Norwegian military in charge. After the war, former S.O.E and later main battle unit RAF 138 Squadron was posted as attached to 130 wing to Vaernes between 27-August-1945 and 7-October-1945. Numerous squadrons, including 332, 331 and 337 were stationed at Værnes in the post-war years. In 1952 the pilot school was moved to Værnes, but in 1954 Ørland Main Air Station became the main air force base in Central Norway, and the majority of the armed air forces (with the exception of the school) moved to Ørland.

After World War II, there was only general aviation at Værnes, organized by Værnes flyklubb and NTH flyklubb. From 1 August 1946 to 31 July 1947, there were 1,221 take-offs from Værnes, mostly during the summer. During parts of 1946 and 1947, the airport was used as a pasture for sheep. The first scheduled service was introduced with a Douglas DC-3 operated to Oslo by DNL during the winter of 1947–48. While there were many customers initially, the lack of sufficient de-icing caused low regularity and fewer customers through the season. The route was not reopened the following year.

The air traffic control at Værnes was established in 1946, after the air force had sent personnel to the United Kingdom for training. The Telecommunications Administration took over the responsibility for the radio installations, and the responsibility for the meteorological services became the responsibility of the Norwegian Meteorological Institute. Trondheim Air Traffic Control Center was also established to monitor all air space over Central Norway. In 1955, a glass dome was built on to the control tower, giving a much better view of the airfield.

Prior to World War II, Heimdal south of Trondheim had been proposed as a location for the primary airport for Trondheim. Construction had started with drainage and ground works, but this work was interrupted by the war. Because of the large investments made in Værnes by Luftwaffe, a commission was established in 1947 to look into if Værnes or Lade instead should be selected. The commission was unanimous in recommending Værnes, highlighting that the airport was of a sufficient size to handle all civilian and military needs in the foreseeable future, and emphasized the proximity to the railway and highway. However, the commission recommended that Heimdal and Lade be kept as possibilities for future expansion. When the issue was discussed in parliament, several members of the Standing Committee on Transport and Communications complained about the long distance to Trondheim, but the low investment needs (stipulated to NOK 1.3 million for necessary navigation and air control investments) convinced parliament, who passed legislation in favor of Værnes on 10 June 1952.

In 1956, NATO approved the plans for Værnes to be financed through its infrastructure investment plan, after rejecting proposals for Heimdal. The costs were estimated at NOK 27.4 million and would allow the runway to be extended to support jet aircraft. Such an extension had already been done at Ørland Main Air Station, but NATO wanted to have two military air station of such dimensions in Central Norway. The east–west runway was to be extended to 2,400 metres (7,900 ft); initial proposals had called for the extension to occur on the east side, but the Ministry of Defence instead wanted the expansion of the fjord side to reduce expropriation costs. This called for a complex civil engineering program, as the railway and highway would have to pass under the runway in tunnels and an artificial island would have to be built in the fjord.

In 1957, parliament started a new process to consider Heimdal as the primary airport, in part because the airlines and the Civil Aviation Administration stated that they felt Værnes was insufficient. However, higher costs—due to bad ground conditions and existing infrastructure at Værnes, valuated at NOK 150 million—caused parliament to support Værnes. Construction commenced in January 1959, with the work subcontracted to Selmer. First the artificial peninsula was built, then the delta of the Stjørdal River was moved, before a tunnel was built around the highway and railway. Finally, the runway could be built on top, and construction completed on 21 October 1961. In 1963, the airport had 115,000 passengers, increasing to 195,000 the following year. That year, SAS started using the Sud Aviation Caravelle jet aircraft on their route.

== Civilian ==
Trondheim Airport, Værnes (IATA: TRD, ICAO: ENVA) is an international airport which shares runways, taxiways, air control, and other joint functions with Værnes Air Station. It is operated by the state-owned Avinor. In 2009, the airport had 3,424,965 passengers and 54,686 air movements, making it the fourth-busiest in the country. The airport has two terminals: Terminal A dates from 1994 and is used for domestic traffic, while Terminal B is the renovated former main terminal from 1982 and is used for international traffic. The airport features an integrated train station and an airport hotel.

The main airlines at the airport are Scandinavian Airlines (SAS), Norwegian Air Shuttle, and Widerøe, all of whom have Værnes as a focus city. The main route is the service to Oslo, which is the tenth-busiest route in Europe, and it is operated by all three of the main airlines. In addition to Oslo, all three fly to Bergen, Bodø, and Tromsø. SAS and Norwegian also have some international services mainly to the Canary Islands and Spain, while Widerøe flies only domestic routes from Vaernes, flying to fourteen airports within Norway. SAS services primarily use the Airbus A320, Norwegian services use the Boeing 737, and Widerøe services use the Bombardier Dash 8 and the Embraer E190-E2. Other services include two daily international flights to Amsterdam provided by KLM, and one daily international flight to Helsinki by Finnair. The airport also provides charter services, mainly to the Canary Islands.
