= Blount Island Command =

Subordinate command of the United States Marine Corps Logistics Command

Coordinates: 30.4065°N 81.5214°W

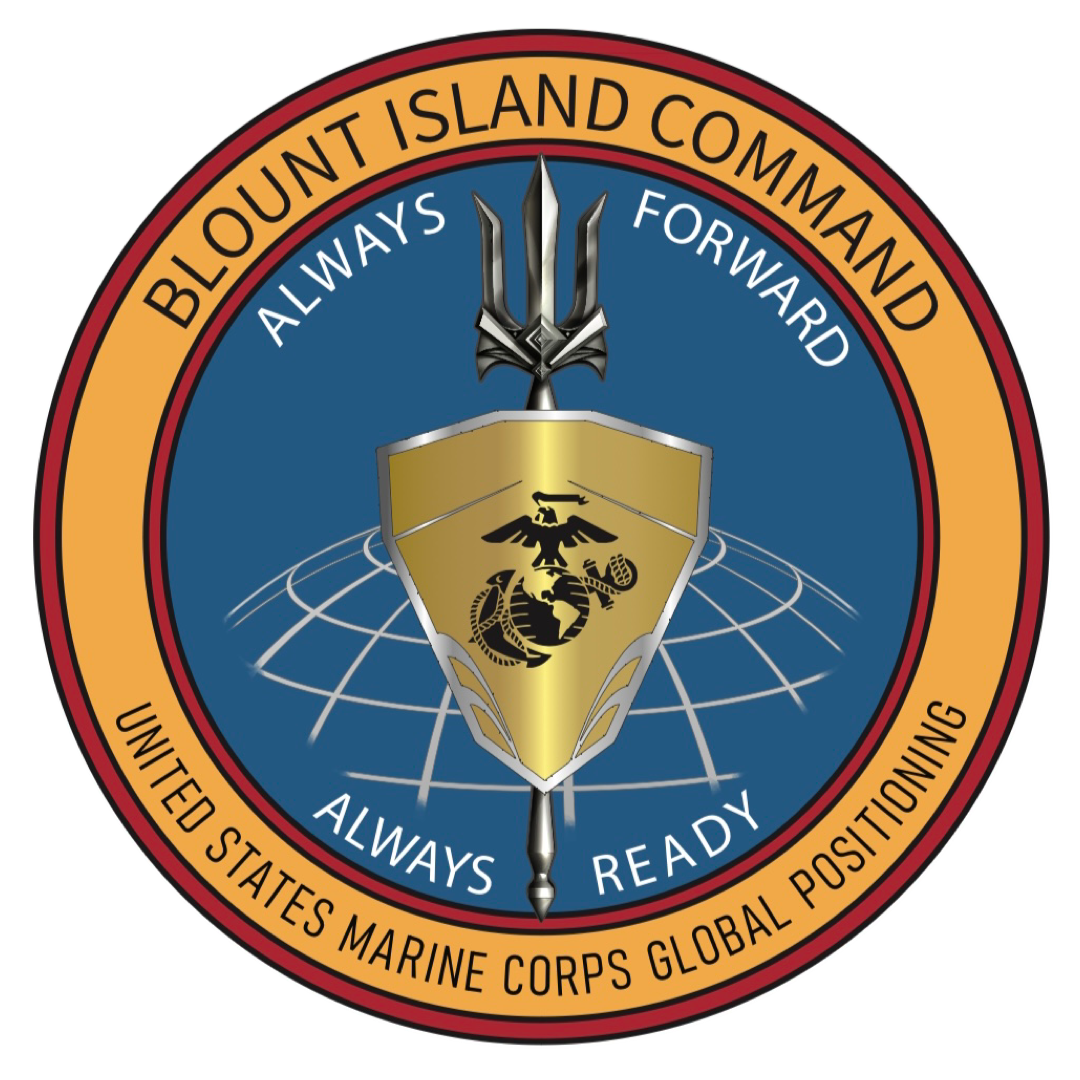
- Other name: BICmd
- Commanding Officer: Colonel David A. Merles
- Command Senior Enlisted Advisor: Sgt Maj Shonor D. Burton
- Dates active: 1986 - Present
- Country: United States of America
- Allegiance: United States Marine Corps
- Headquarters: Marine Corps Logistics Command
- Active regions: Jacksonville, Florida and Worldwide locations

Blount Island Command is a Marine Corps support facility located in Jacksonville, Florida.

== History ==
In 1977, President Jimmy Carter signed the directive that created the Rapid Deployment Joint Task Force. By 1980, the Marine Corps had seven Military Sealift Command chartered vessels that could carry supplies where needed. These dedicated ships were loaded in Wilmington, North Carolina in July 1980 and became fully operational in 1981. Equipment and ship maintenance for them was conducted in Okinawa and Subic Bay Naval Base in the Philippines.

That same year, planning began for a permanent support force. 13 ships were organized into three squadrons and strategically located to support global coverage. The new program became operational between 1984 and 1986.

Maritime Prepositioning Ships Squadron-1 (MPSRON-1) became operational in 1984 on the U.S. East Coast, supporting the 6th Marine Amphibious Brigade (MAB) (all MABs changed to MEBs in the late 1980s), and was relocated following Operation Desert Storm to the Mediterranean Sea to establish a forward presence in the European theater. MPSRON-2 replaced the NTPF ships in the Indian Ocean (Diego Garcia) in 1985 and continued to support 7th MAB based at Camp Pendleton, California. The first two squadrons were loaded at Wilmington, North Carolina (1984-85). MPSRON-3 was established in the Pacific Ocean (Guam and Tinian) in 1986 supporting 1st MAB based in Hawaii. The third squadron was loaded at Panama City, Florida (1986). The ammunition for all three squadrons was loaded at the Military Ocean Terminal, Sunny Point, North Carolina.

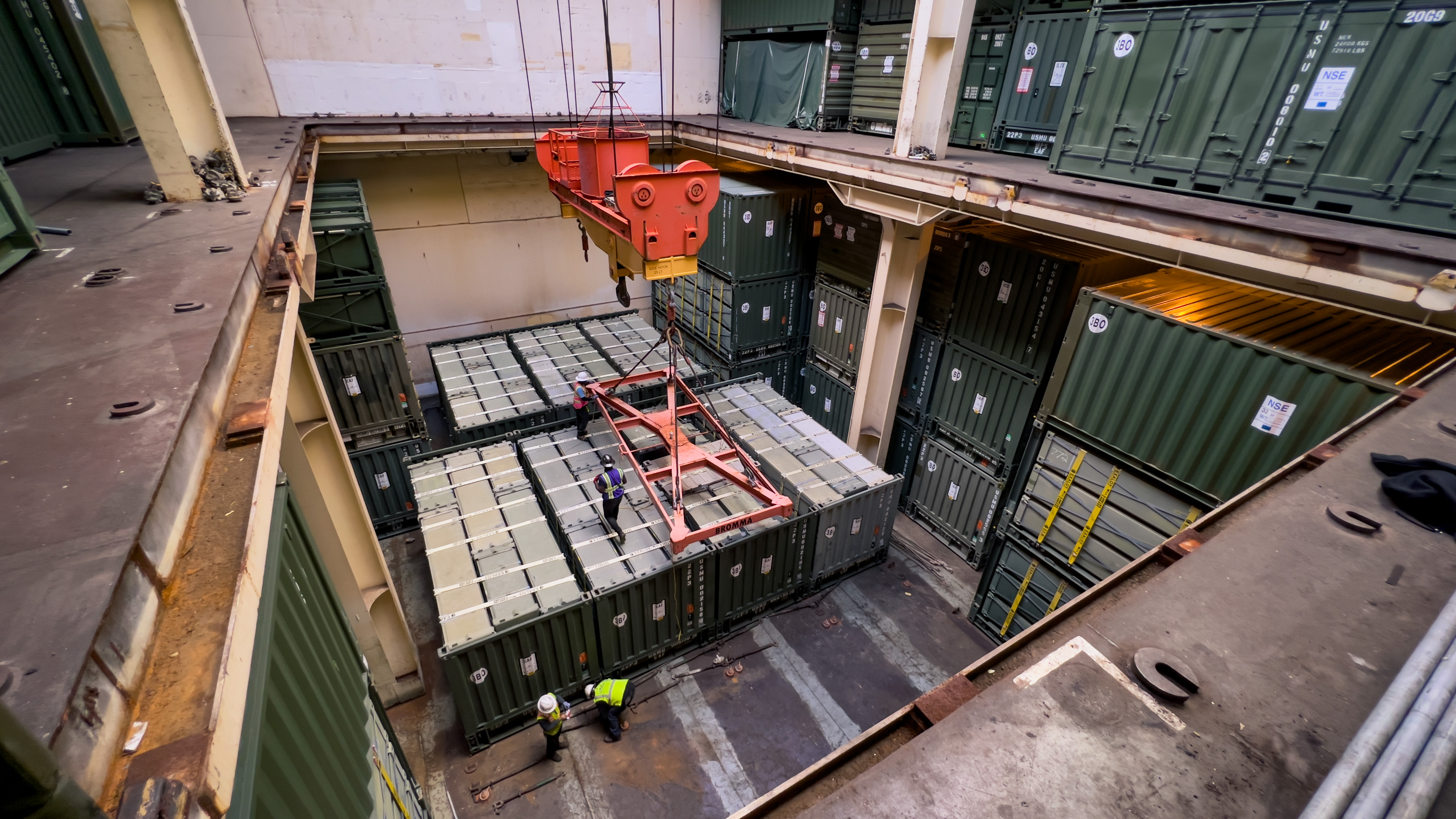
MPF Ship being offloaded at MCSF-BI

Operation Desert Shield/Desert Storm validated the MPF concept when the MPF supported the establishment of the first self-sustaining, operationally capable force in northern Saudi Arabia. The first battalion of the 7th MEB occupied its defensive positions within four days of the MPS arrival. The first nine MPF ships from MPSRON-2 and MPSRON-3 offloaded in August 1990 and provided equipment and 30 days sustainment for two-thirds of the Marine Corps forces ashore, as well as supporting United States Army forces. The ships of MPSRON-1 offloaded in December 1990.

In June 1991, MPF assets were employed as part of Operation Fiery Vigil to assist the Republic of the Philippines when Mount Pinatubo erupted, burying whole cities and forcing the evacuation of Clark Air Base. Also, from December 1992 through May 1993, four MPS, reconstituted in Al Jubayl, supported Marines conducting peacekeeping and humanitarian assistance operations in Somalia during Operation Restore Hope (ORH). In January 2003, 11 of the then 15 MPF ships were offloaded in support of Operation Iraqi Freedom (OIF) and reconstituted between July and November 2003. In February 2004, selected equipment and supplies from MPSRON-2 were used in support of OIF-II.

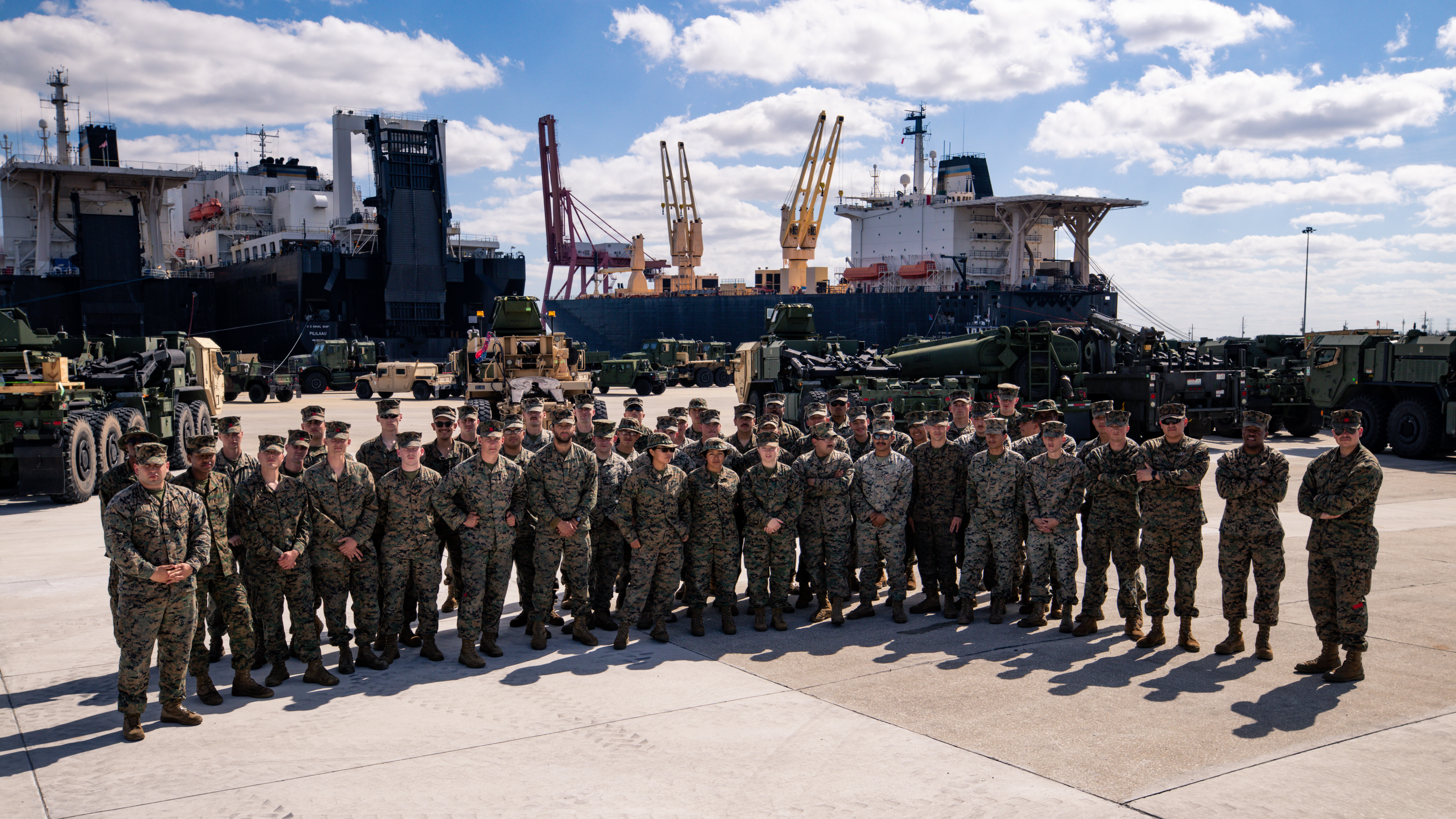
MPF-EX23

The key to successful employment of a Marine Air Ground Task Force (MAGTF) that falls in on the Maritime Prepositioning Ships (MPS) Program or Marine Corps Prepositioning Program – Norway (MCPP-N) equipment is the availability and readiness of the prepositioned equipment and supplies. BICmd works closely with the supported expeditionary force commander to exceed ISO 9001 goals of 98% attainment, 98% readiness, and 98% data accuracy of the prepositioned combat capability sets. BICmd's focus will always be on the combat readiness, visibility, and attainment of prepositioned equipment and supplies.

== Property leased ==
In 1986, the Marine Corps established the Biennial Maintenance Command (BMC) at Blount Island, Jacksonville, Florida on 262 acres (1.06 km^{2}) leased from Gate Maritime Properties (GMP) for $11M per year. In 1989, Blount Island Command was established as a subordinate command to Marine Corps Logistics Base Albany, Georgia.

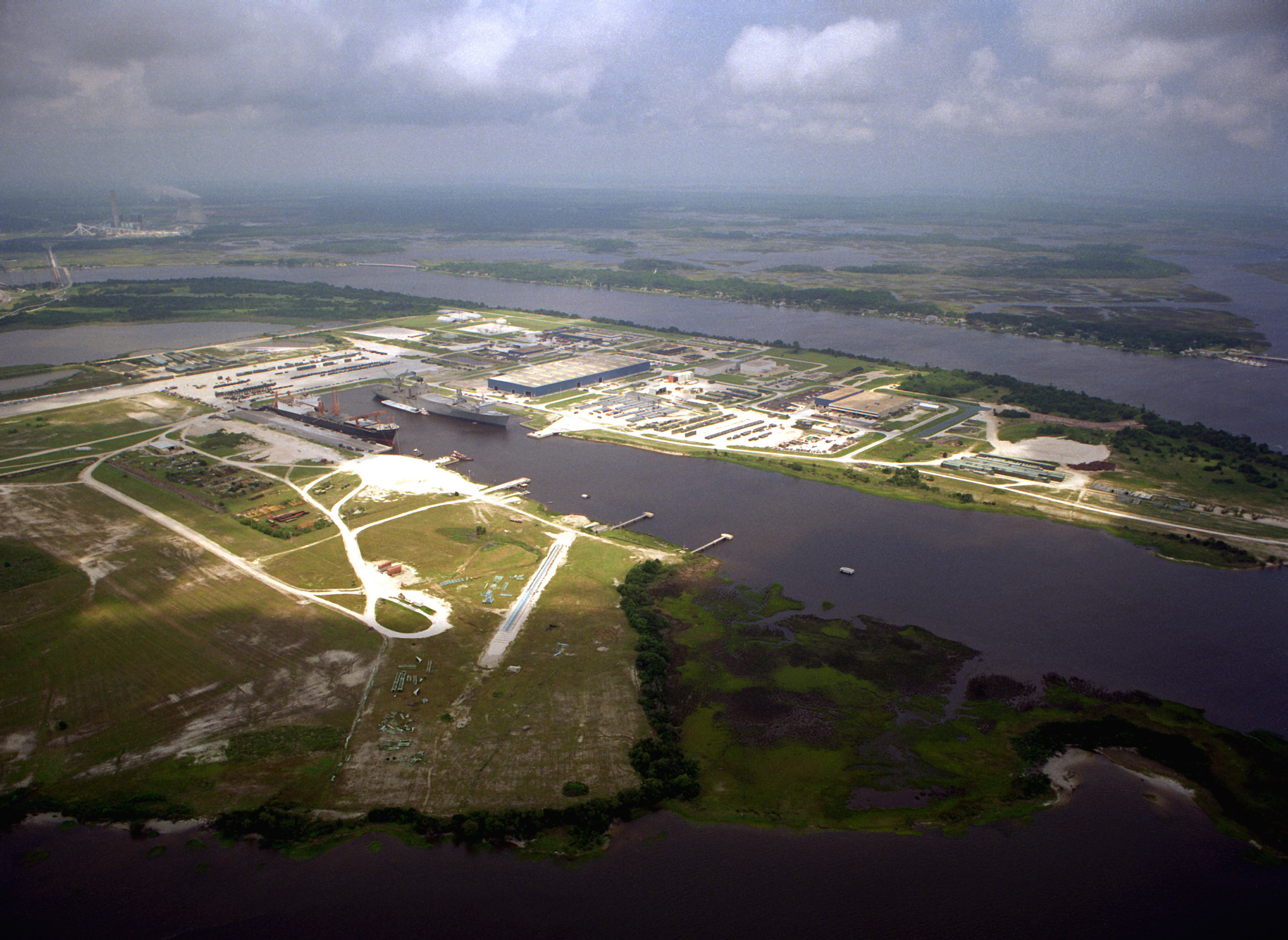
Overhead picture of BICmd, taken in 1994

=== Property purchased ===
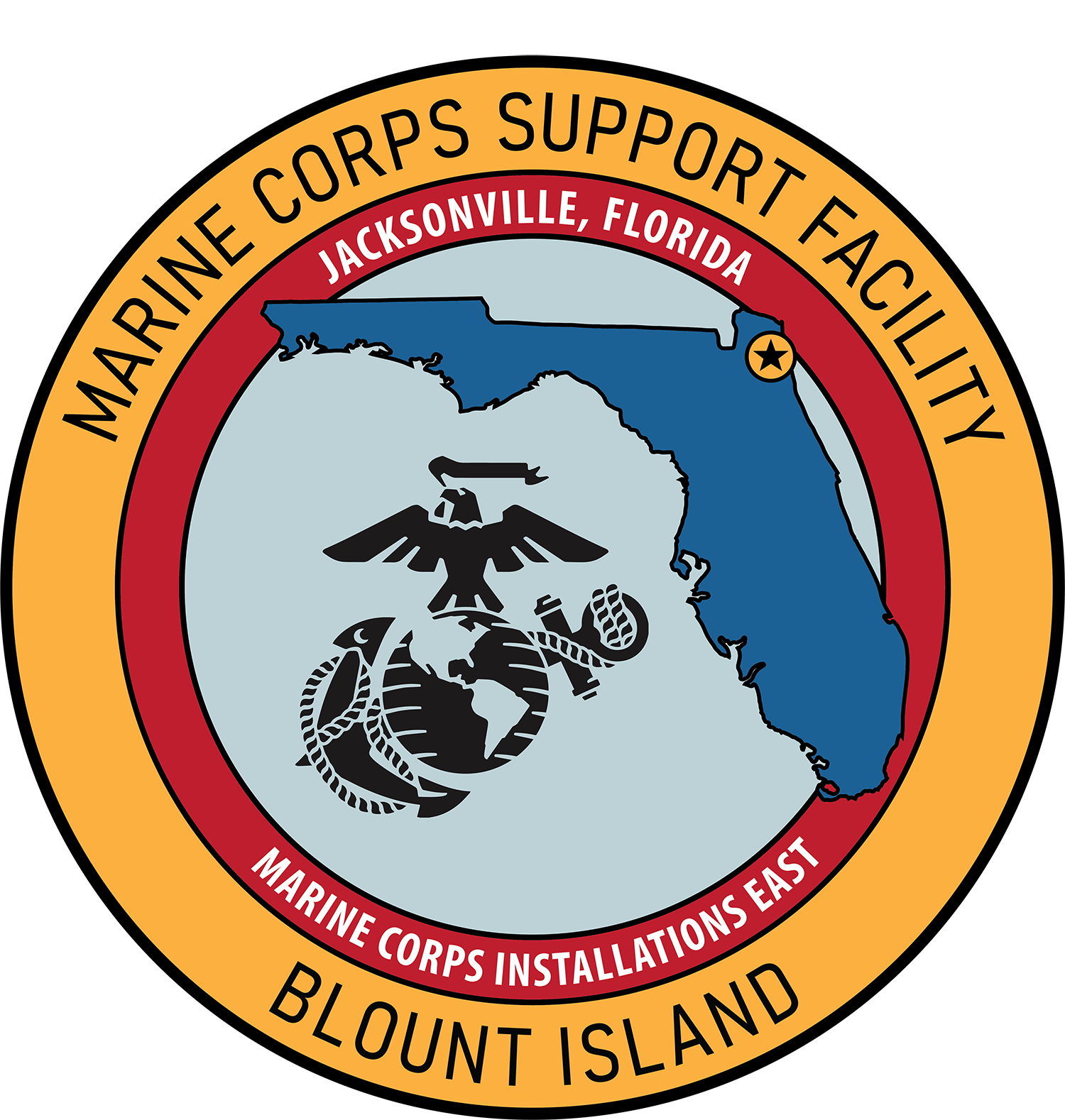
MCSF Logo

The lease between GMP and the Marine Corps was due to end in 2004, and in 2000, the Corps stated their intentions to purchase the property when the lease expired. The Marine Corps budget included $115.7 million for the acquisition, but extended negotiations did not result in an agreement. GMP contended that the land was worth between $160 million and $200 million, so in August 2004, the Marine Corps seized 1,100 acres (4.5 km^{2}) on Blount Island (GMP's entire Blount Island holdings) by eminent domain and initially paid $101 million. When land is seized by eminent domain for uses that benefit the public, the government is required to pay landowners "just compensation", so GMP asked for a jury to decide the land's value. On November 14, 2005, a jury determined that the government must pay $160 million for the parcel.MCSF-BI was officially activated as the host installation command for BICmd on 21 November 2006. The installation is a subordinate command of the Marine Corps Installations East, which is located at Camp Lejeune, North Carolina.

== Industrial Logistics Operation ==
Blount Island Command is now operationally under the command of the Marine Corps Logistics Command (MARCORLOGCOM). MARCORLOGCOM is located at Marine Corps Logistics Base in Albany, Georgia. BICmd manages Marine Corps Contractor Logistics Support (CLS) programs.

BICmd's functional responsibilities for military forces include:

- Field level maintenance of all Marine Corps' maritime prepositioned equipment and supplies
- Oversight of the Marine Corps Prepositioning Program in Norway

Blount Island Command's location offers a number of strategic advantages such as:

- A private marine slipway with 5 large vessel berths. These berths are located only 8 miles from Naval Station Mayport (NS Mayport) and the St. Johns River's outlet to the Atlantic Ocean
- Close proximity (about 218 miles) to Marine Corps Logistics Base Albany in Georgia
- Convenient access to the Navy's industrial support facilities at Naval Station Mayport (NS Mayport) and Naval Air Station Jacksonville (NAS Jacksonville)
- BICmd has more than 33 acres of equipment / materiel staging area (located adjacent to the 1,000-foot pier and maintenance area on the St Johns River
- BICmd has an overflow staging and maintenance area that can support the loading or off-loading of Maritime Prepositioning Ships (MPS)

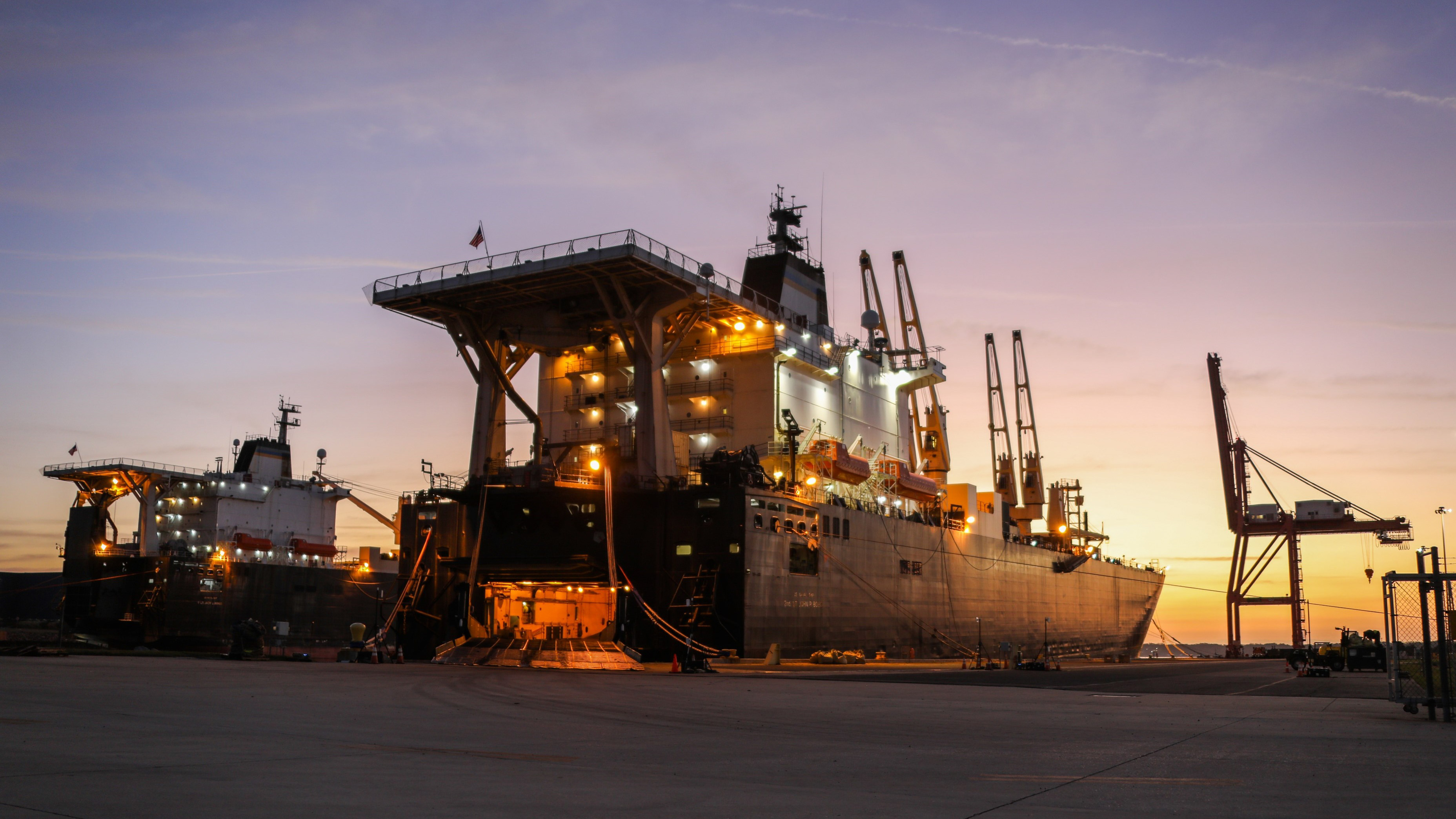
MPF Ship

Approximately once every 42 months, the MSC Maritime Prepositioning Ships (MPS) must go into dry dock for inspection and maintenance. The Marine Corps uses this time to access the ships' equipment which is then inspected, maintained, and then tested. Combat equipment for the ship are also repaired and painted as required. Vehicle and equipment modifications and upgrades are installed (or replaced) during this time. BICmd's government workforce of approximately 250 military and civilian employees (GS). Work with roughly 1,000 civilian contractors (CTR) to produce high quality, reliable combat capability sets for operational use by the Fleet Marine Force (FMF).

== Operation ==
Marine Corps Support Facility Blount Island (MCSF-BI) is among the latest US bases built. It was built for maintenance operations to the maritime ships.

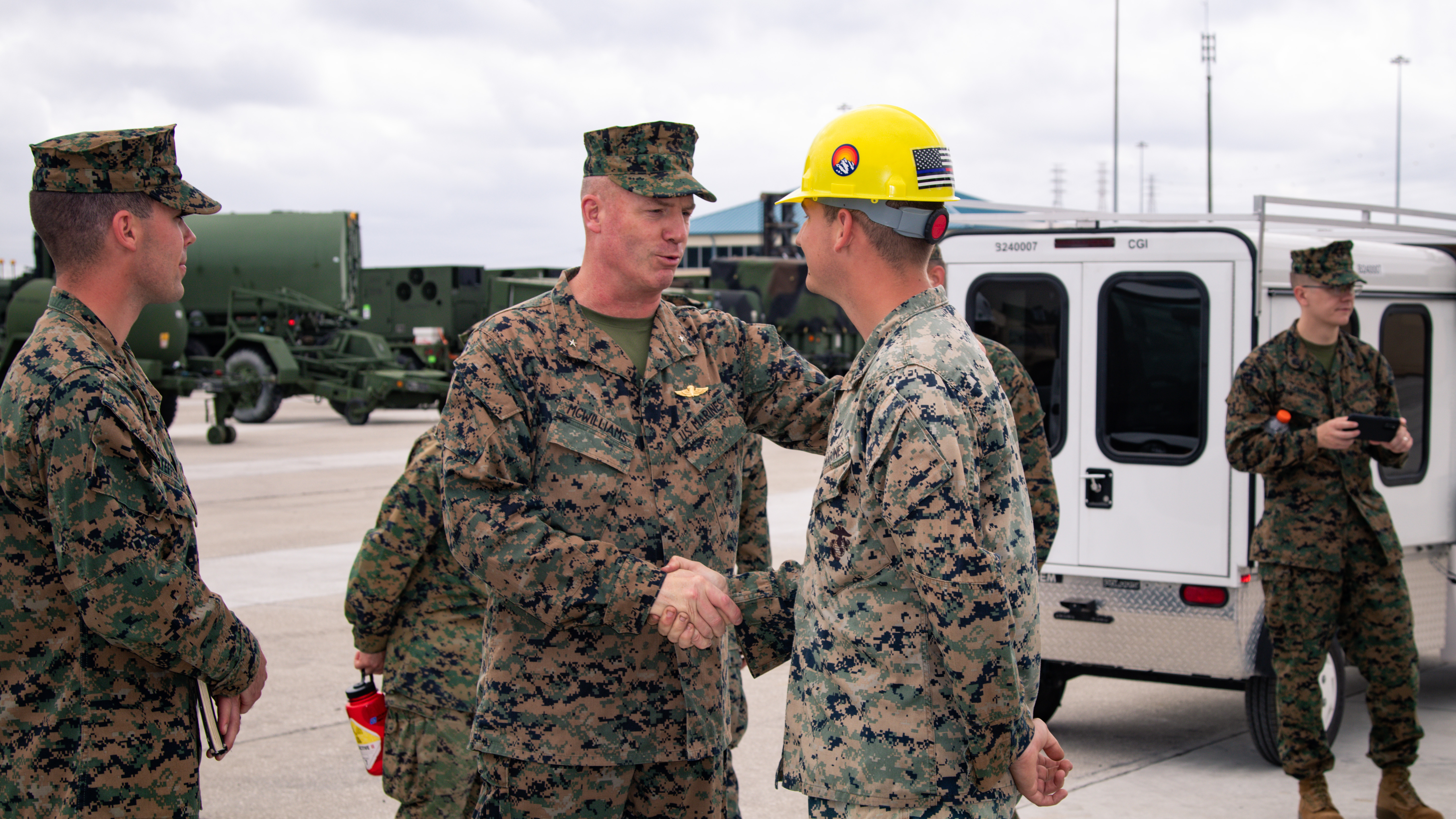
Marines at BICmd

The base is responsible for the planning, coordination and execution of logistics procedures of the MPF. The ships are used in various operations. They are loaded and sent to the ocean, where they wait for their destination. Each operation may have a military or a humanitarian purpose. All this work is handled by over 1000 civilians, led by 250 military troops. Once an operation is complete, the ship gets back to the base, is loaded again and heads back to the ocean for new orders. It is a continuous cycle.

== Mission ==
Blount Island Command (BICmd) provides technical assistance to Marine Air-Ground Task Force (MAGTF) commanders for all aspects of planning, deployment, arrival and assembly, and reconstitution of prepositioned assets. Directly supporting power projection during global crises.

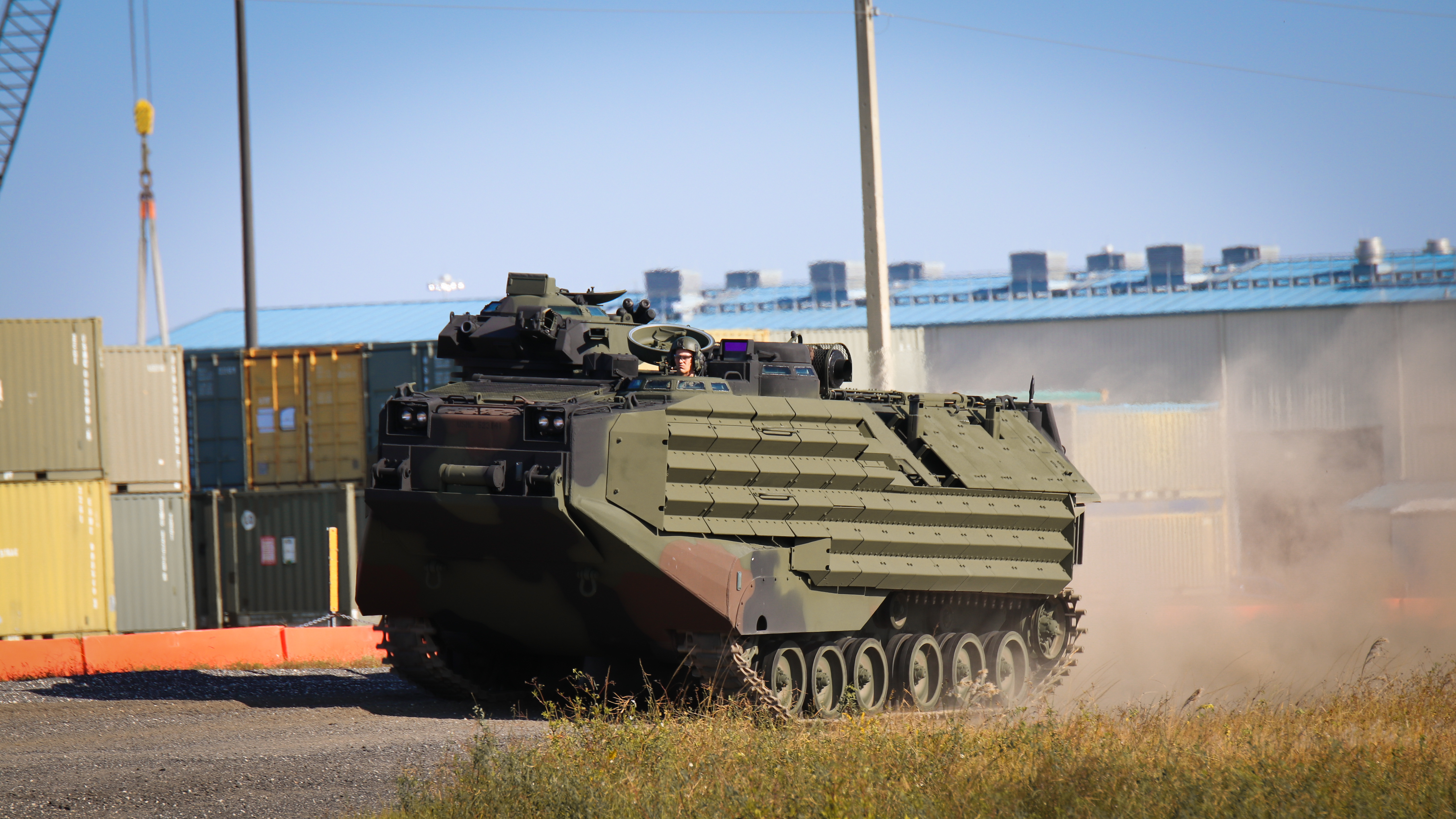
Equipment being tested at BICmd

Located in Jacksonville, Florida, aboard Marine Corps Support Facility Blount Island (MCSF-BI), this industrial base and a robust local Navy support infrastructure provides an advantage not readily available to other sites. The MPF consists of two Maritime Prepositioning Ship Squadrons that carry the combat equipment and sustainment to support up to two Marine Expeditionary Brigades of roughly 18,000 Marines and Sailors each. BICmd also manages the Marine Corps Prepositioning Program-Norway and is involved with ongoing efforts to develop a Global Positioning Network.

== United States Marine Corps Prepositioning ==
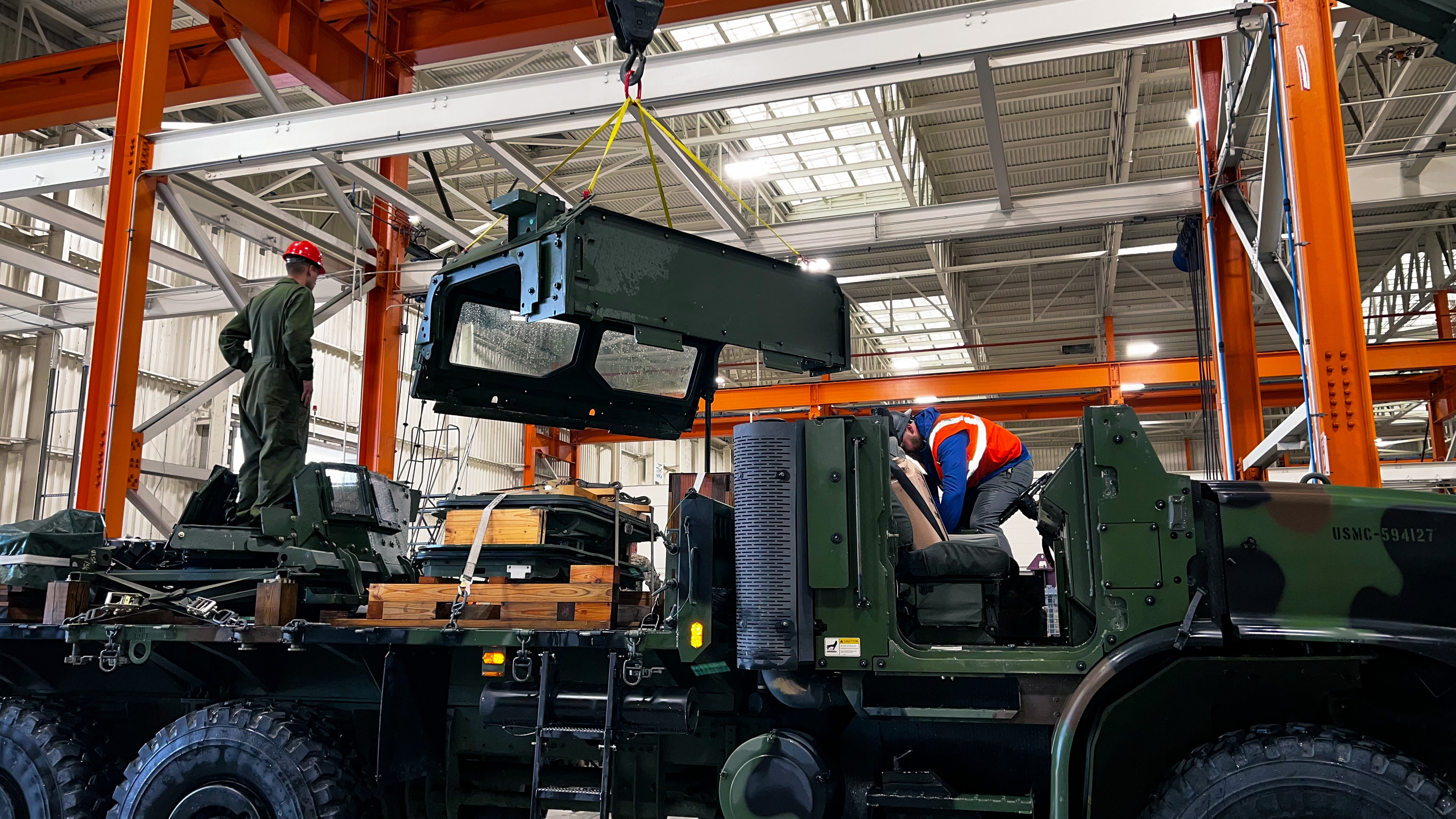
Equipment being worked on at BICmd

== Gallery ==
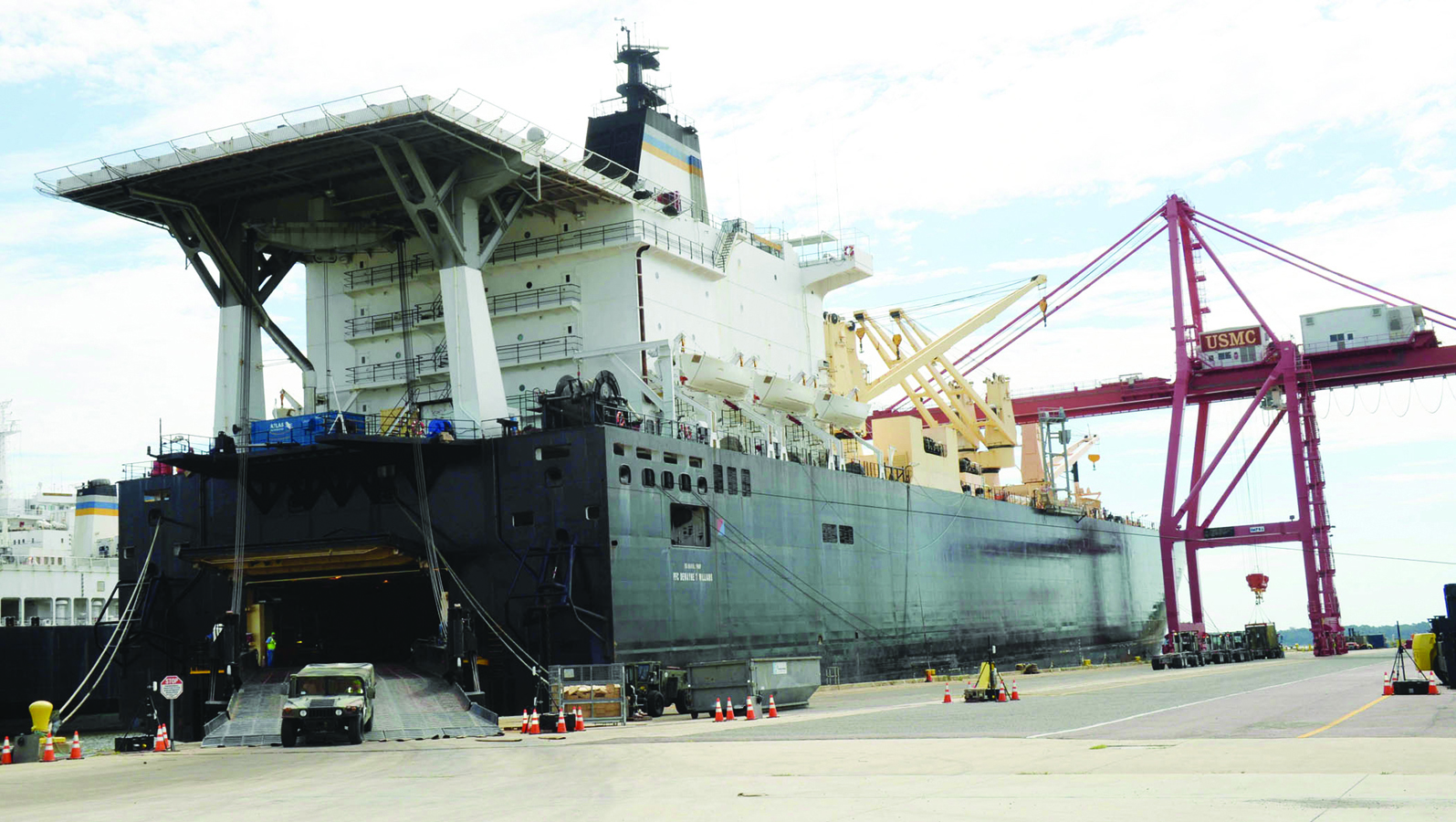
USNS PFC Dewayne T. Williams (T-AK-3009) unloading cargo

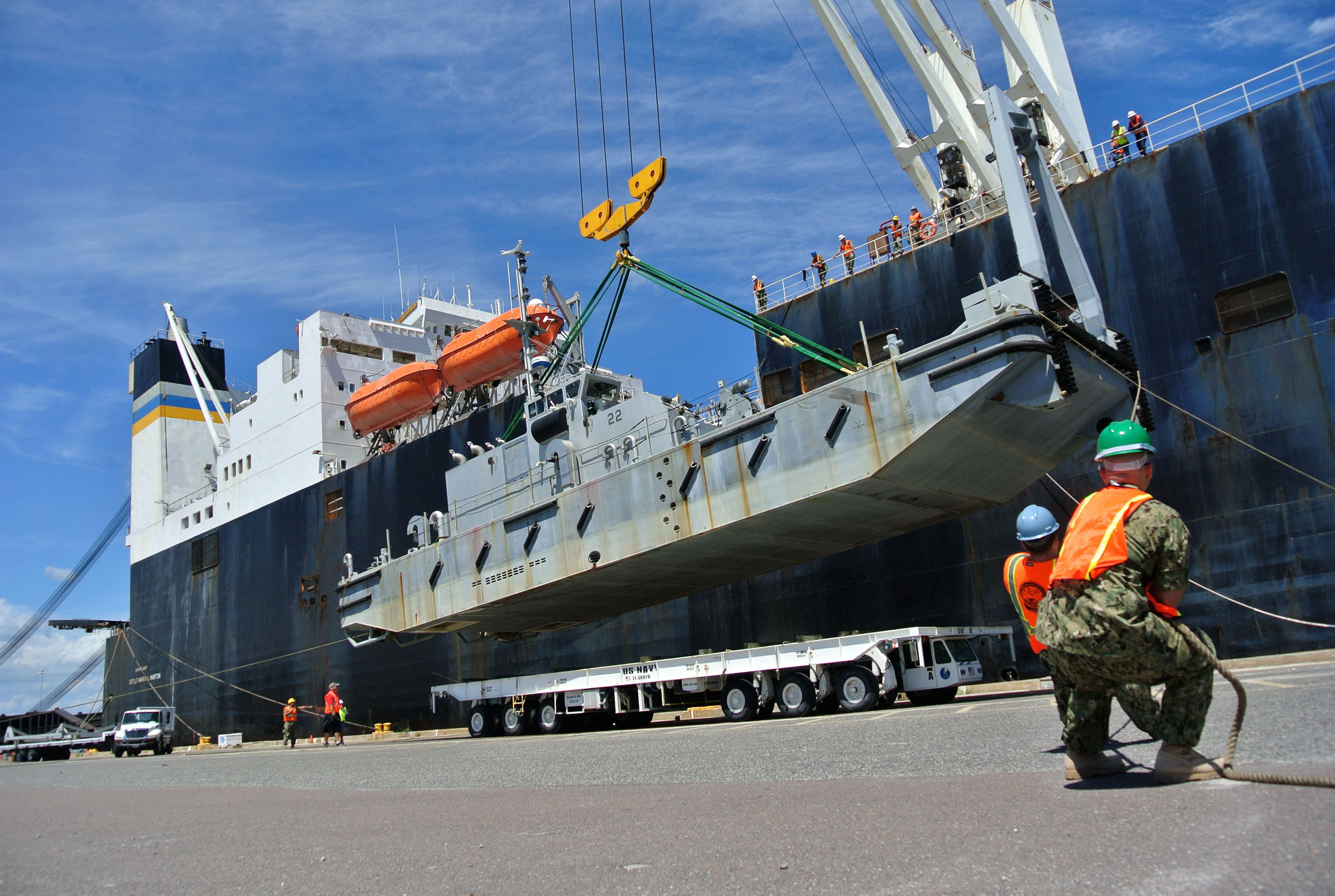
USNS 1st Lt Harry L. Martin (T-AK 3015) unloading cargo

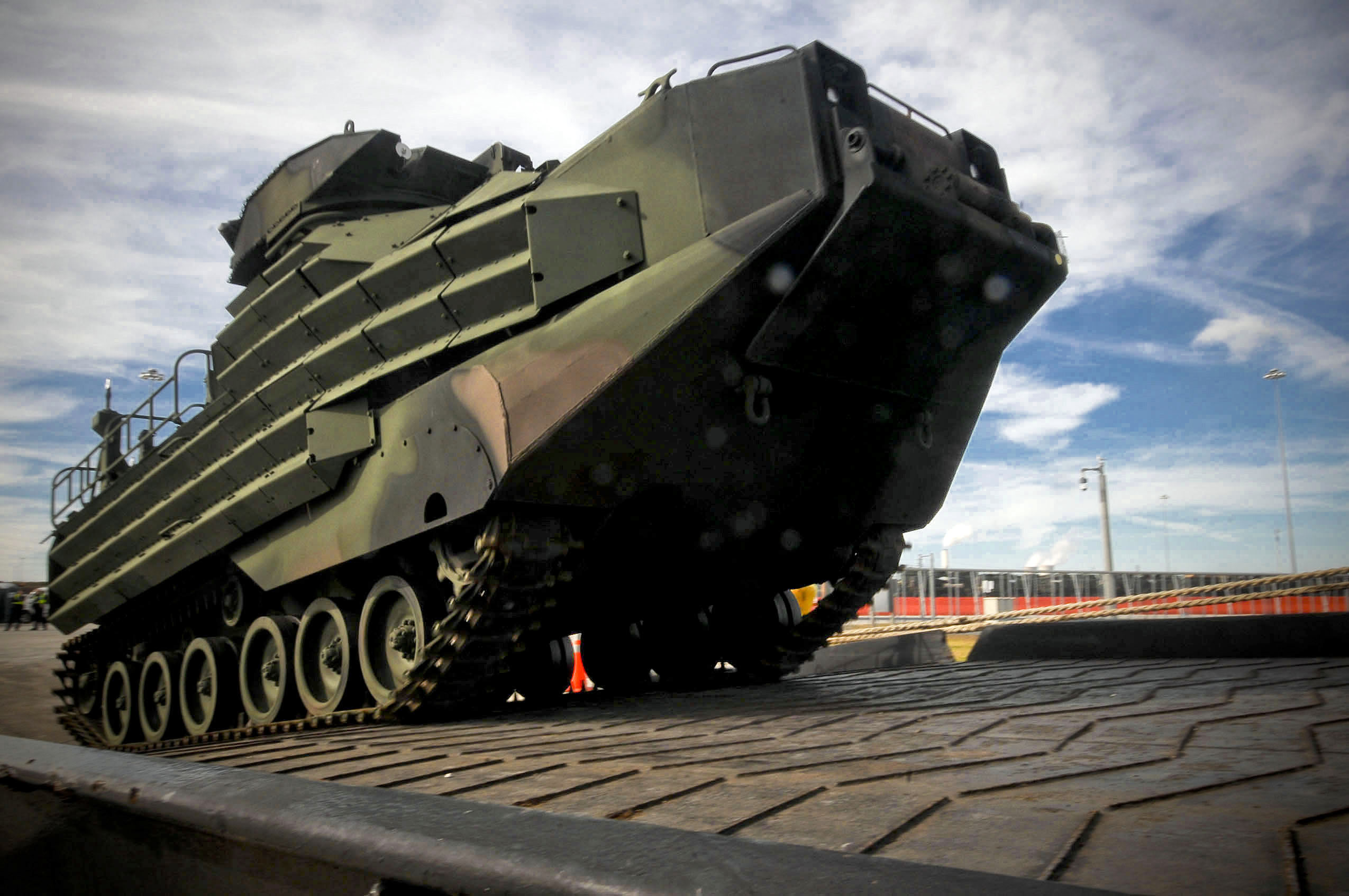
USNS 1st Lt. Jack Lummus (T-AK-3011) receives cargo for Operation Unified Response due to the 2010 Haiti earthquake.

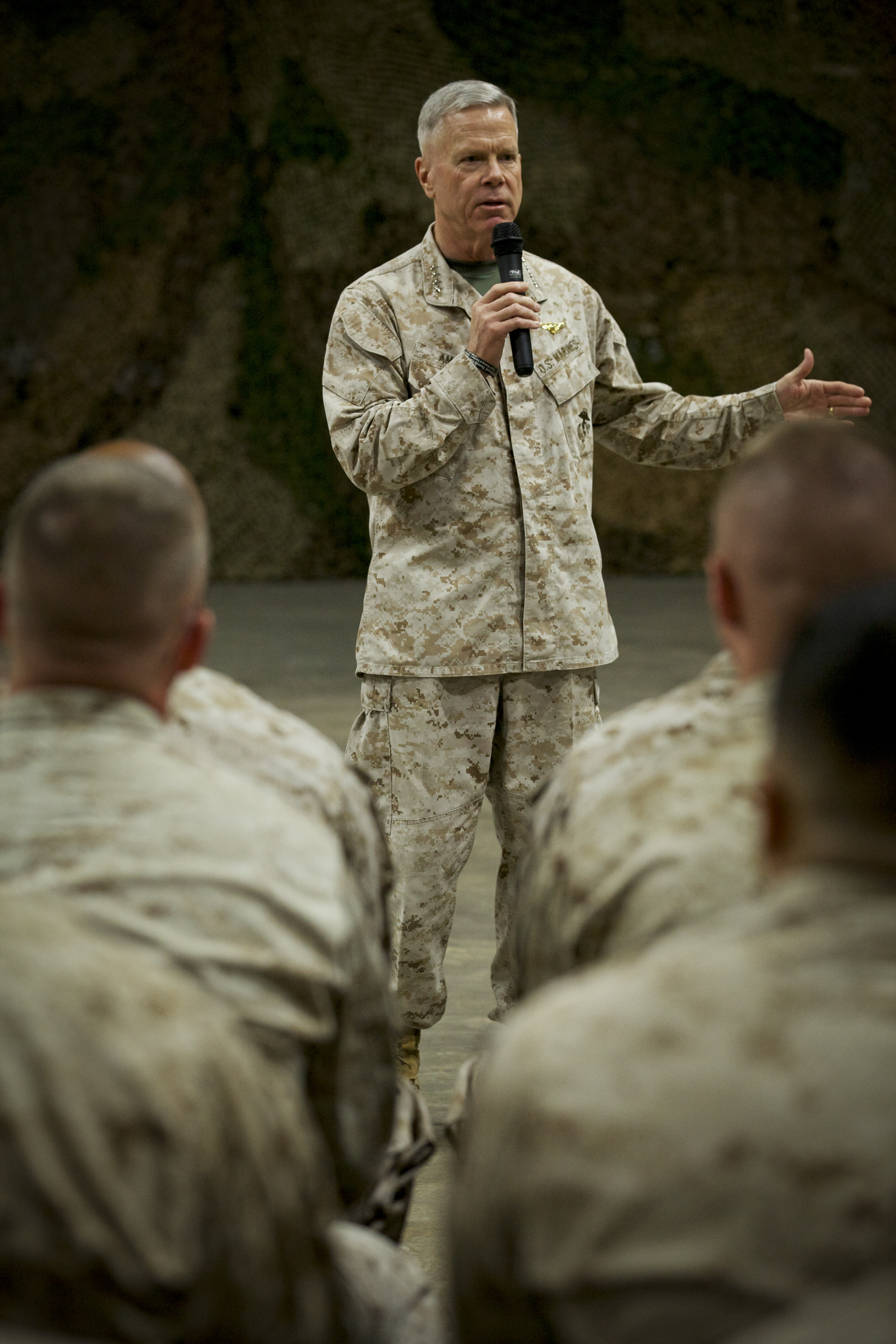
Former Commandant of the Marine Corps General James F. Amos addresses Marines and Department of Defense employees at Blount Island Command.

== See also ==
- List of United States Marine Corps installations
