= Marine Corps Prepositioning Program-Norway =

US military stockpiles program in Norway

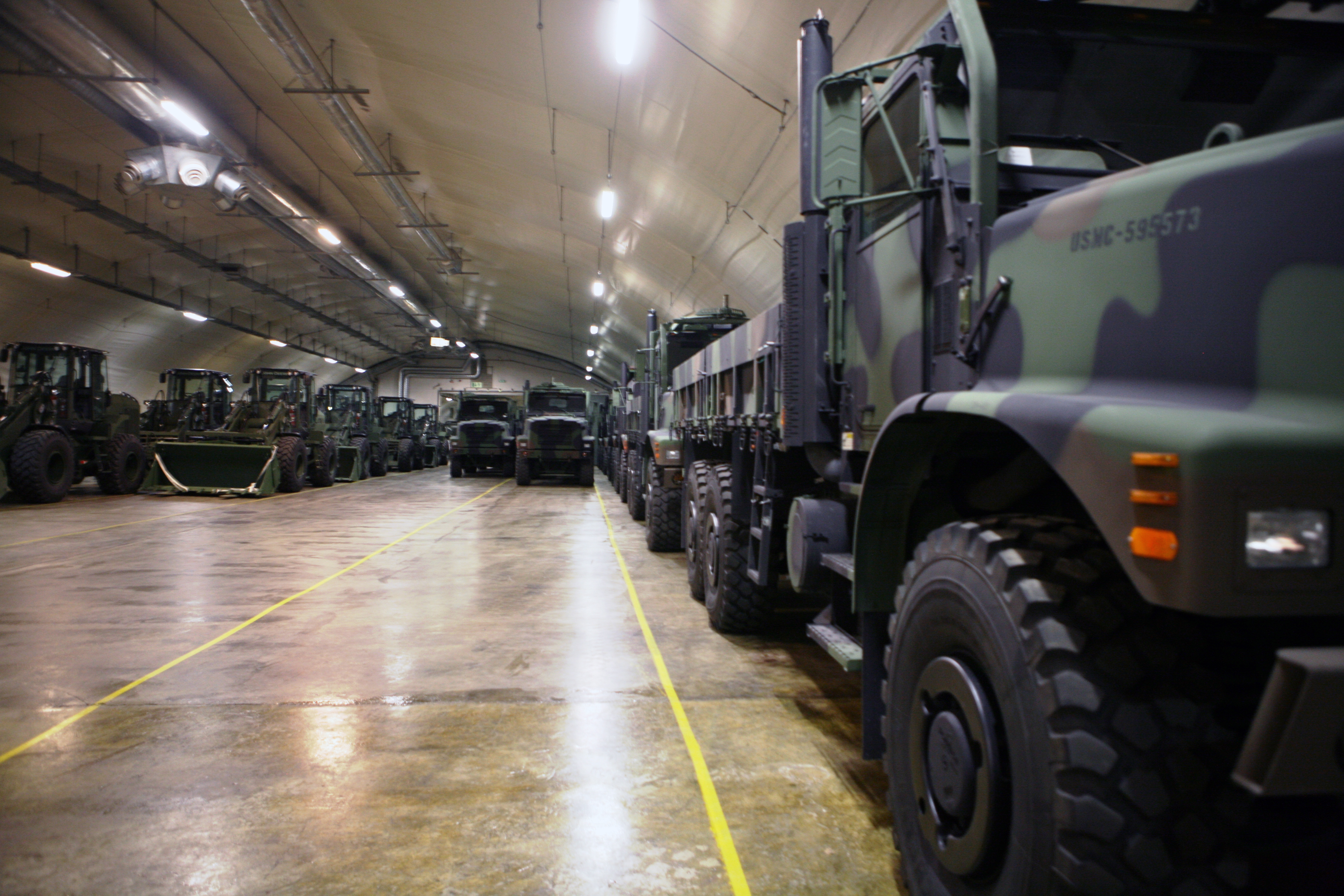
United States Marine Corps front loaders and 7-ton trucks in the Frigard supply cave during 2012

Stockpiles of United States Marine Corps weapons, vehicles, ammunition and other equipment have been located in Norway since 1982 as part of what is currently designated the Marine Corps Prepositioning Program-Norway (MCPP-N). This material is stored in a network of climate-controlled caves and buildings near the city of Trondheim, and is drawn upon as part of worldwide US military operations. Norway has met most of the costs of the MCPP-N since the 1990s, and the sites are mainly staffed by Norwegians.

== History ==
The US military began storing equipment in Norway during 1982 after a memorandum of understanding was signed between the two countries that year. This initiative was initially designated the Norway Air-Landed Marine Expeditionary Brigade Program, and aimed to allow NATO forces in the region to be more quickly reinforced. The first storage cave commenced operations in 1982, and all of the facilities were completed by 1988.

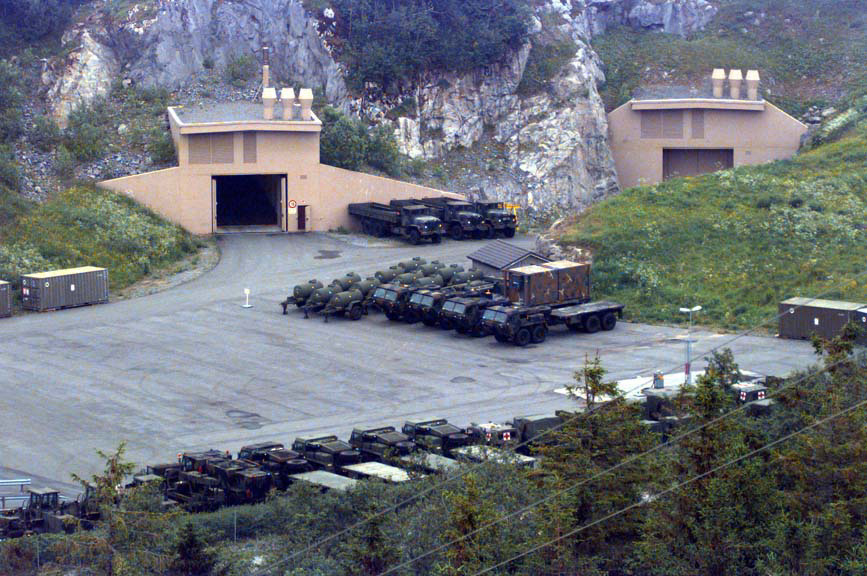
An entrance to the storage caves at Bjugn Municipality in mid-90's

Following the end of the Cold War, the US Government considered closing the stockpiles. However, they remained after the Norwegian Government agreed to meet the cost of maintaining them during the 1990s. The facilities are used to support worldwide US military operations, and most of the equipment stored in Norway was sent to the Middle East for use in the 2003 Iraq War. The stockpiles began to be rebuilt following 2005.

A new memorandum of understanding setting out how the MCPP-N is administered was signed in 2005. Under this agreement, Norway provides physical infrastructure, transport assets, security personnel and maintains most of the equipment stored in the sites. US military personnel maintain some items due to security restrictions.

In 2012 the equipment located in Norway began to be modernised to meet the standards of a contemporary Marine Air-Ground Task Force. The amount of equipment located in the country was also increased from 2014 due to tensions with Russia. As of 2015, the MCPP-N equipment was stored at eight sites near Trondheim. Of these, three held ground vehicles, another three were used to store ammunition and two contained aviation-related equipment. At this time the program was managed by the Blount Island Command, which also oversees the Marines' ship-based prepositioning programs. In 2016 it was reported that the facilities were staffed by 100 Norwegian and American personnel.

Reports of the amount of equipment stored in Norway differ. In 2015 DefenseNews reported that the US facilities in Norway had enough supplies to sustain a Marine Expeditionary Brigade (MEB) in combat for 30 days. An unclassified United States Marine Corps handbook issued that year stated that the "primary focus" of the MCPP-N is to support a Marine Air-Ground Task Force (MAGTF) "built around a command element, an infantry battalion task force, a composite aviation squadron, and a logistics element". The handbook stated that the facilities could support several forces simultaneously, with "sets" of equipment being available for different tasks, and that the equipment could be used to "augment" that of a Marine Expeditionary Brigade. In 2020 the United States Marine Corps website stated that "Currently, MCPP-N can provide munitions to support a MEB for up to 30 days, and ground equipment to support a MAGTF built around an infantry battalion task force, combat logistics battalion, and composite aviation squadron. Additionally, MCPP-N is postured to be the Marine Corps’ preeminent cold weather and mountaineering equipment set, providing cold weather, unique items to deploying MAGTFs, to include arctic tents, skis, snowshoes, and ice chains for tactical vehicles".

== Facilities ==
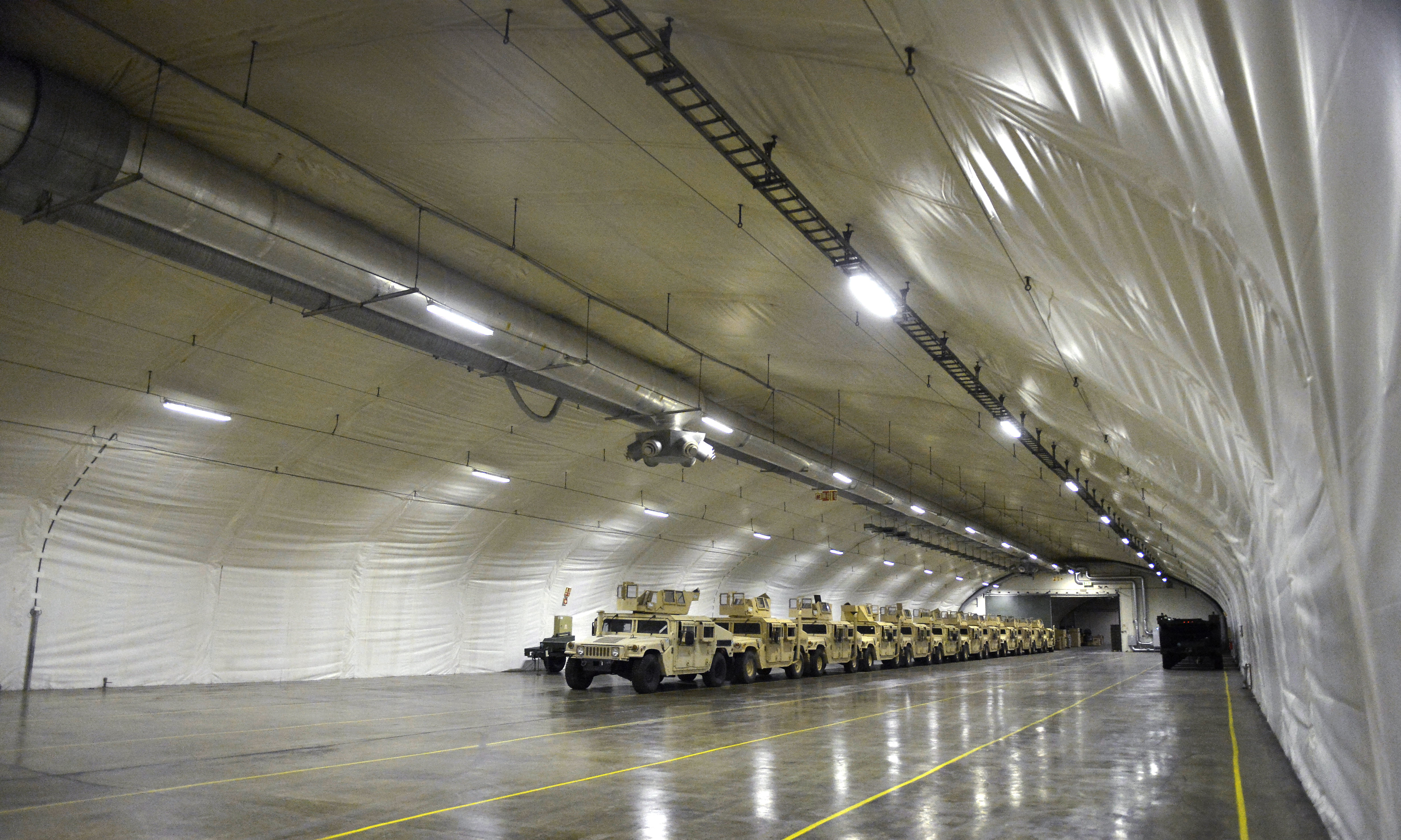
Vehicles inside one of the storage caves in 2015

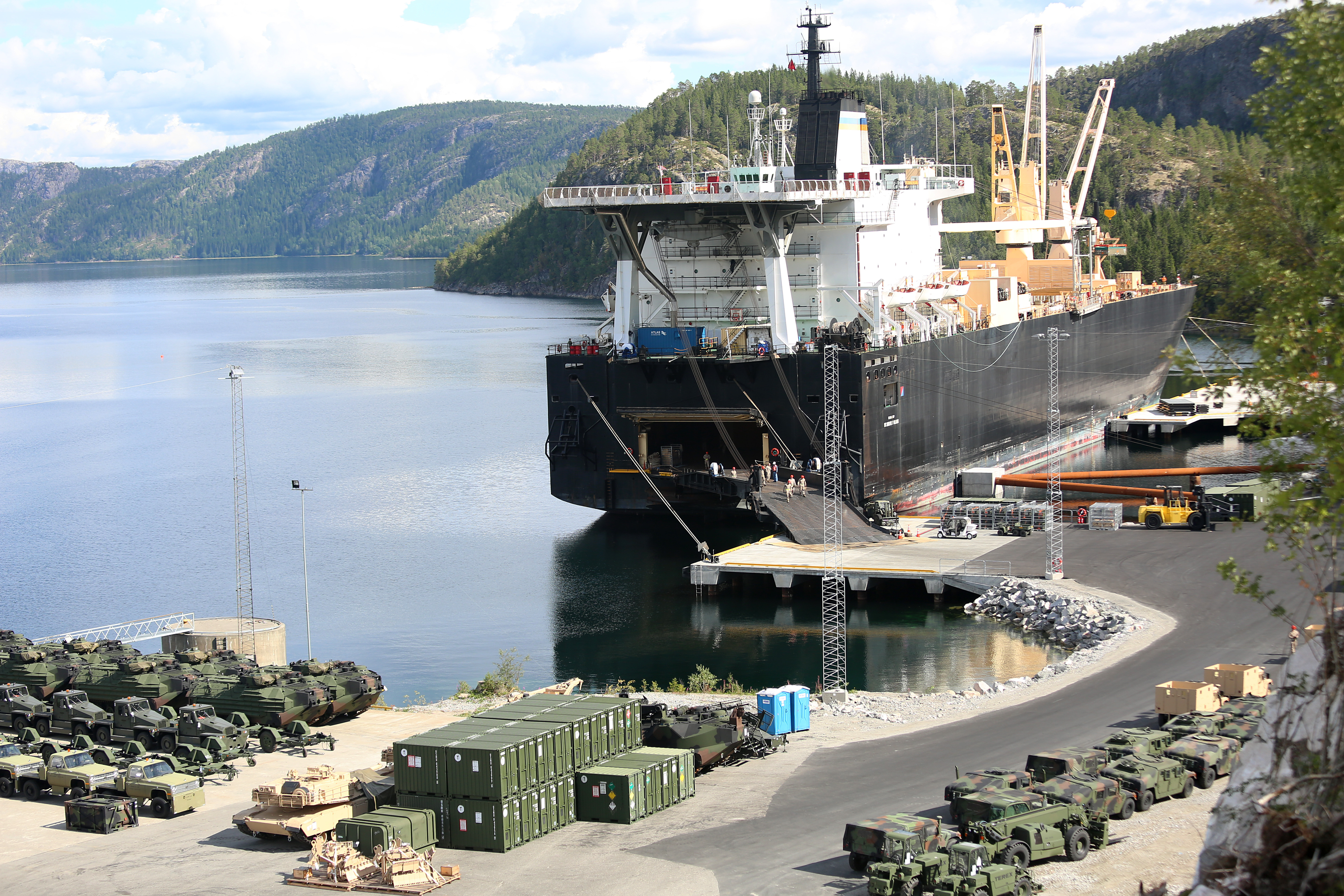
Vehicles and equipment being offloaded in 2014 as part of the modernization of the materiel stored in Norway

According to an unclassified United States Marine Corps handbook, the Marine Corps Prepositioning Program-Norway included the following facilities in 2015. At this time the two aviation reception sites were located in above-ground buildings, and the other sites were in caves.

Facility	Equipment stored	Storage space (net square feet)
Frigaard	Ground equipment & supplies	192,577
Tromsdal	Ground equipment & supplies	218,281
Bjugn	Ground equipment & supplies	118,941
Værnes Garrison	Rotary wing aviation reception site	57,079
Ørland Main Air Station	Fixed-wing aviation reception site	19,768
Hammernesodden	Ground munitions	19,142
Hammerkammen	Ground munitions	20,164
Kalvaa	Air & ground munitions	27,169
