= North Weald Airfield =

Airport in North Weald, Essex, England

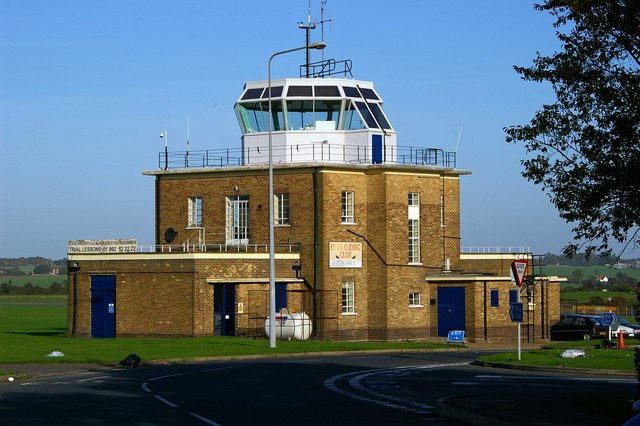
- The control tower at North Weald
- IATA: none; ICAO: EGSX

Summary
- Airport type: Public/unlicensed
- Owner: Epping Forest District Council
- Operator: Epping Forest District Council
- Location: North Weald
- Elevation AMSL: 321 ft (98 m)
- Coordinates: 51°43′18″N 000°09′15″E
- Website: North Weald Airfield

Map
- Location in Essex

Runways
Direction	Length		Surface
Direction	ft	m	Surface
02/20 Main	6,171	1,881	Asphalt/concrete
02/20 Grass	963	294	Grass
- Sources: Epping Forest District Council

North Weald Airfield (ICAO: EGSX) is an operational general aviation aerodrome, in the civil parish of North Weald Bassett in Epping Forest, Essex, England. It was an important fighter station during the Battle of Britain, when it was known as the RAF Station RAF North Weald. It is the home of North Weald Airfield Museum. It is home to many private aircraft and historic types, Essex & Herts Air Ambulance helicopter and is an active flight training airfield.

== History ==
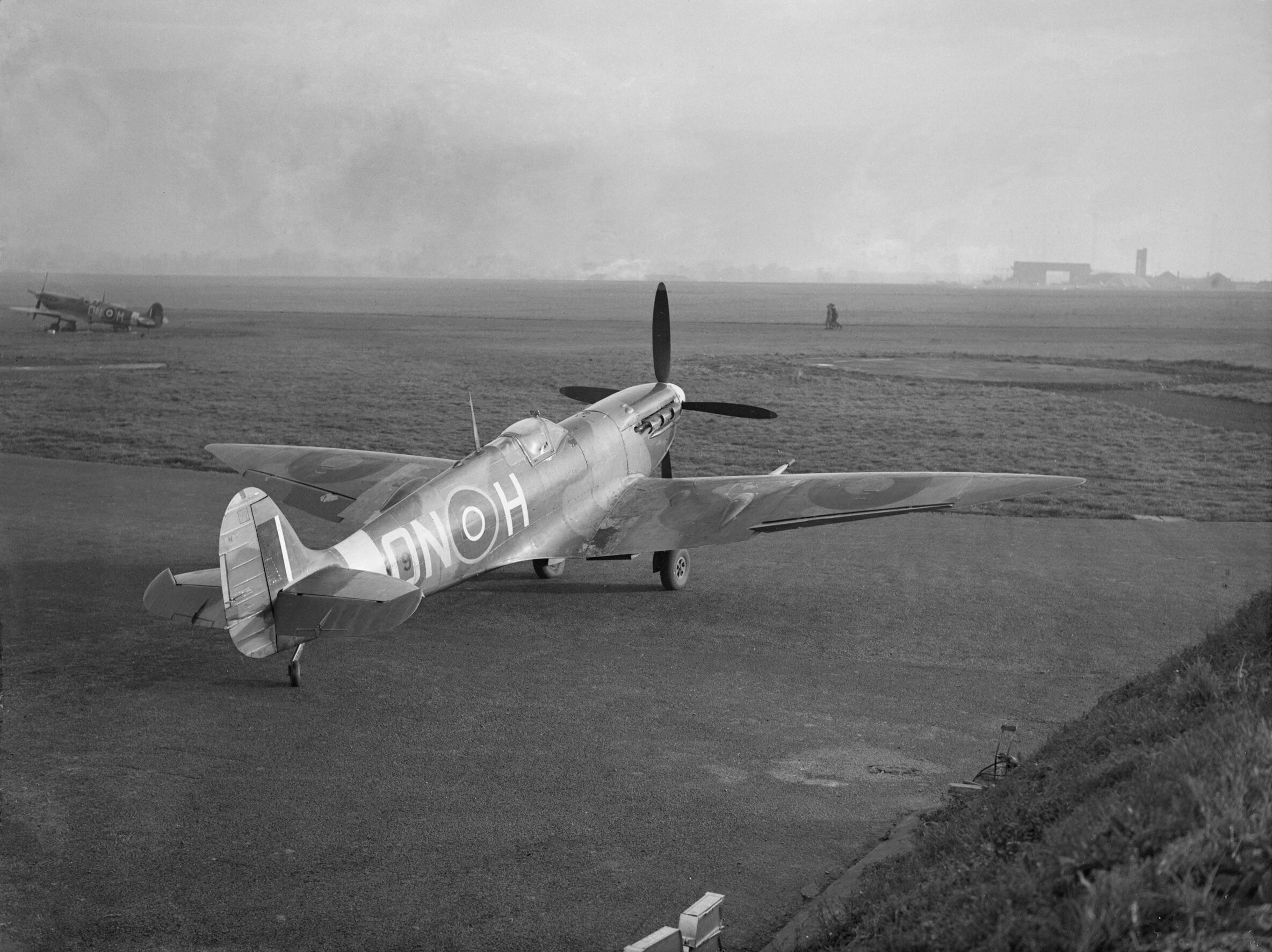
A Spitfire Mk VI at North Weald in 1942

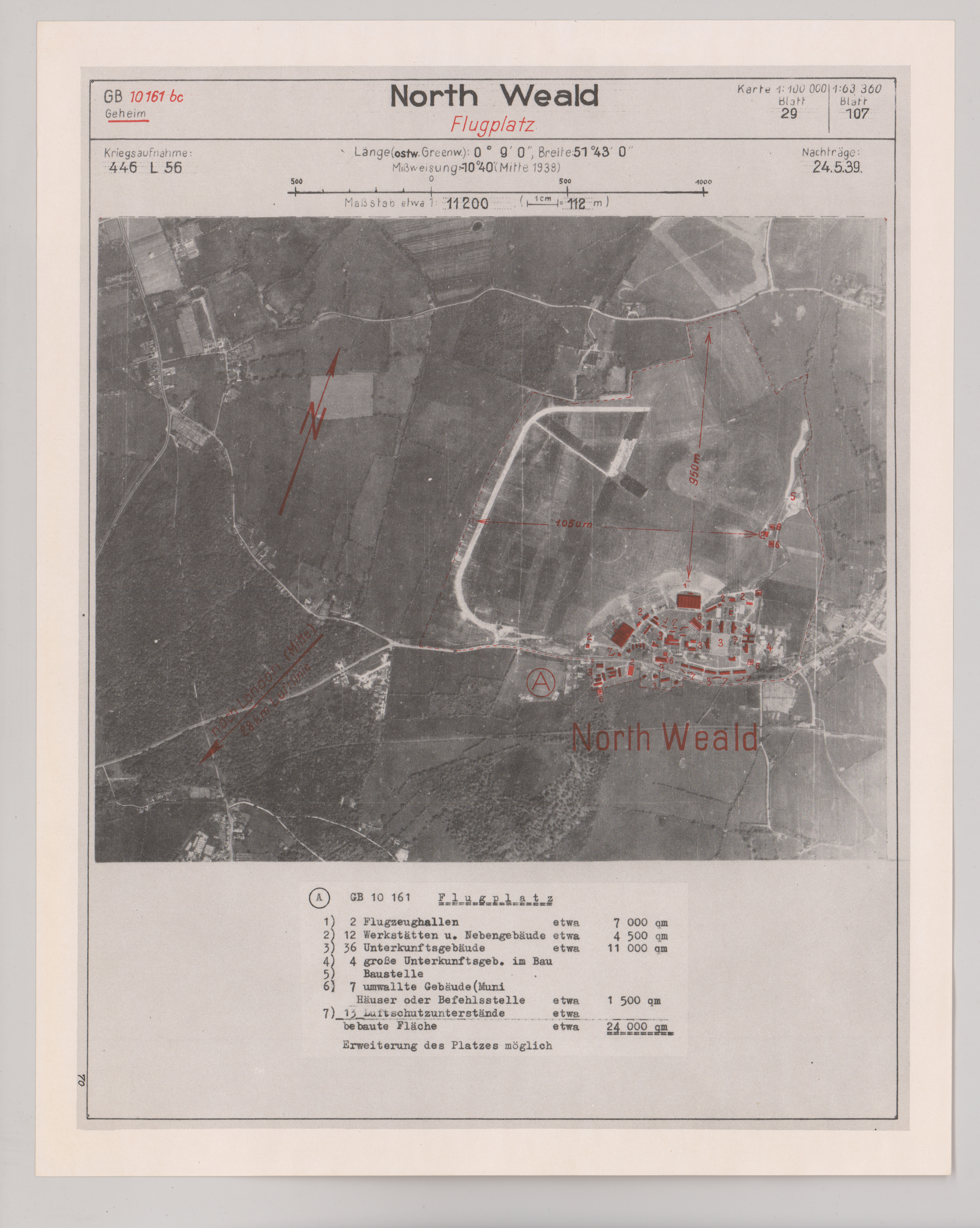
RAF North Weald on a target dossier of the German Luftwaffe, 1939

Royal Flying Corps Station North Weald Bassett aerodrome was established in the summer of 1916 during the First World War by the Royal Flying Corps. Later it became Royal Air Force with effect from Monday 1 April 1918. Its military functions continued to develop during the interwar period, with the building of large hangars and accommodation for Royal Air Force (RAF) personnel. The airfield played an important part in the air defence strategy of the United Kingdom during the Second World War. Initially Hawker Hurricanes were deployed at the airfield, alongside Bristol Blenheim night fighters. The Hurricanes from North Weald saw action over the beaches of Dunkirk and played a key role in the Battle of Britain. In 1940, two American Eagle Squadrons moved into North Weald supplied with Supermarine Spitfires. A couple of years later, Norwegian squadrons were reassigned to the airfield.

Following the war jet fighter squadrons were based at North Weald. The sight of Gloster Meteors and de Havilland Vampire fighters in the west Essex skies was commonplace from 1949. In the late 1940s and until the mid-60s an Air Training Corps gliding school, latterly No 614 VGS, also operated at North Weald on weekends, teaching cadets up to certificate B. Later the Essex Gliding Club was formed at North Weald and operated for many years until local airspace congestion forced a move to Ridgewell in North Essex.

The Control Tower was built in 1952 as part of the early Cold War modernisation efforts. A Grade II listed building, it remains one of only seven control towers of this type to be built and considered to be one of the best surviving examples.

The last front line combat unit, No. 111 Squadron RAF flying Hawker Hunters, the famous Black Arrows of 22 loop formation fame, left North Weald in 1958. In 1964 the RAF withdrew from the airfield completely. The first Royal International Air Tattoo was held at North Weald in 1971. The airfield spent time in both British Army and Royal Navy hands for a short time until in 1979 North Weald became surplus to the Ministry of Defence (MoD) operational requirements and was sold to Epping Forest District Council.

An original 1927 hangar remains, as does the former Officers Mess, a Grade II listed building. Some former married quarters dating from the early 1970s (and now in private ownership) can be seen in Lancaster and York Roads. A Hawker Hurricane Mk1 replica has been erected near the main gate and can be viewed on market days.

== Civilian use ==
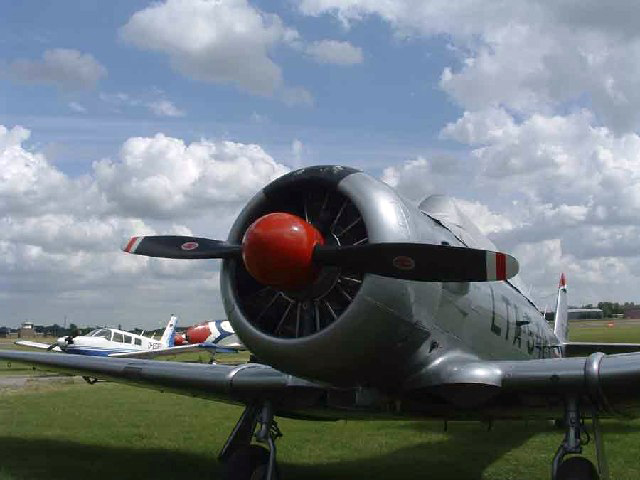
Aircraft exhibit at North Weald Airfield

North Weald is a general aviation airfield with over 40,000 movements per annum, connecting people from London and Essex, with destinations across England and abroad by air travel.

The airfield is home to a collection of vintage and veteran aircraft such as the Supermarine Spitfire, North American P-51 Mustang, Curtiss Kittyhawk, Douglas Dakota, Douglas Skyraider, Supermarine Seafire and North American Harvard. The aircraft are kept airworthy and many are available for experience flights. The resident operators include Hangar 11 Collection, Aero Legends, and Kennet Aviation. It's also home to early ex-military jets such as the Hunter, Venom, Vampire, Gnat and Jet Provost. The Hawker Hunter, which crashed at the 2015 Shoreham Airshow was based at North Weald.

Pilot training, aircraft rental and pleasure flights on general aviation types such as Cessna 172 and Piper PA28 are offered by Academy Aviation, North Weald Flight Training and North Weald Flying Group.

The airfield was protected with listed status as a historical site in 2005.

=== Non-aviation uses ===
The former crosswind runway and the southern side of the field are used to host community events, supercar driving experiences, as a filming and a specialist driving training location and has commercial, logistical and local businesses, with further industrial development currently planned.

There is a large Saturday market based on the airfield which draws huge crowds from around Essex and north London. It claims to be one of the largest open air markets in the UK. Bus service 522 operates a frequent service to the market from Harlow, and the service is subsidised by the company that owns the market.

The airfield was used as the transit camp for the 21st World Scout Jamboree.

In the 1990s, the Aces High hangar was used as the home for Channel 4's TV game show The Crystal Maze, which had moved from Shepperton Studios due to Shepperton kicking them out because of a movie needing all their stages. A Lego City Stuntz commercial was filmed on the field.

An inland border facility has been opened on the airfield in January 2021 to help alleviate the impact of Brexit.

There is also a small café on site, namely Wings Café, serving food and drinks to the general public.

=== Fixed Base Operators ===
FBOs at North Weald provide aircraft maintenance and repair, handling and cleaning, refuelling and hangarage services, as well as visitor parking and events organising.

North Weald Flying Services or The Squadron, established in 1989, is a licensed general aviation aircraft maintenance company in accordance with EASA Part M Sub Part G, Part 145 and M5. North Weald Flying Services was acquired by Aero Legends in 2019.

Weald Aviation is a licensed general aviation aircraft maintenance company offering A8-20 maintenance and E4-M5 design approvals, with specialist knowledge on various types of warbirds and ex-military aircraft.

=== North Weald Airfield Museum ===
The focus of the North Weald Airfield Museum is the people who worked at RAF North Weald in World War I and World War II, including both service personnel and civilians. Exhibits include photographs, personal memories, and artifacts about the airfield's history, including its role in the Battle of Britain, the American and Norwegian squadrons stationed there in World War II, and the Royal Air Force squadrons stationed there over the years. The museum is located in the former RAF North Weald Station Office, situated just outside the airfield's current perimeter. Visitors can examine military vehicles and historic aircraft.

=== North Weald Fire Rescue ===
North Weald Fire Rescue are a private independent fire and rescue service from Great Dunmow in Essex. Their vehicles are based and operated nationwide out of the airfield. Their fleet of vehicles and crews have been in attendance at events at the airfield since 1987.

=== RAF North Weald Memorial ===
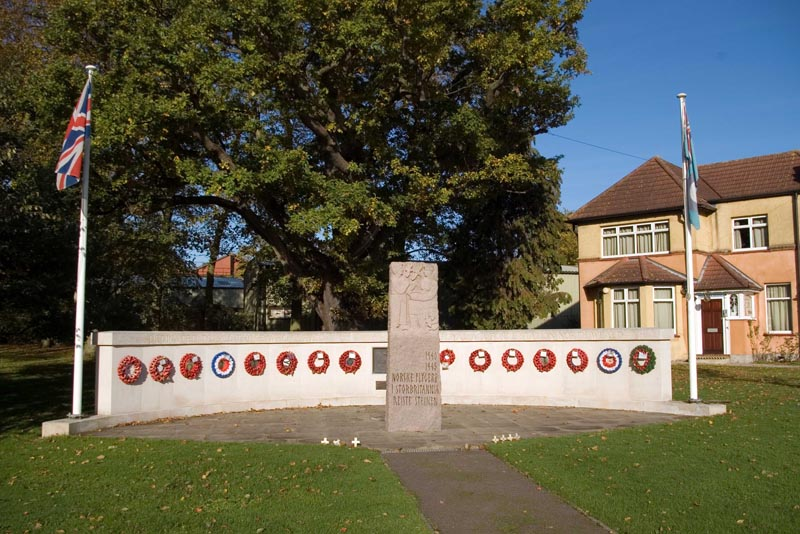
The RAF North Weald Memorial with the Norwegian Memorial at the centre

The RAF North Weald Memorial is dedicated to all who served at North Weald. Located near the airfield's main gate, it was dedicated in 2000. The memorial includes an obelisk erected in 1952 by the people of Norway in commemoration of the Norwegian airmen stationed at the airfield in World War II.

=== Development controversy ===
The East of England Regional Assembly on its Draft Regional Spatial Strategy for the East of England examination in public exercise asked members of the public for comment on the possibility of the airfield location being used as the site for a development plan for 6,000 houses. It received over 6800 objections and followed on strong lobbying against the project by local residents.

=== Essex & Herts Air Ambulance ===
Essex & Herts Air Ambulance launched its Hertfordshire service in 2008. Originally based at Hangar 7 on the airfield, it moved to a purpose-built base in 2021. From 2008 until 2017, the service operated an MD902 Explorer. From August 2017, Helimed 55 was upgraded to an AgustaWestland AW169 - a £5 million helicopter which the charity fully owns. Two rapid response vehicles are also based here.

The other aircraft operates from Earls Colne Airfield.

=== National Police Air Service ===
On 7 September 2017 it was provisionally agreed by Epping Forest District Council to allow the National Police Air Service to operate three helicopters and one fixed wing aircraft from North Weald Airfield with a 25-year lease. The facility serves as the main base for police aircraft in the London area and neighbouring counties, replacing the previous London base at Lippitts Hill. Kier Capital Projects commenced work near the airfield's western perimeter late in 2018, and flying operations commenced in the autumn of 2019.

== Accidents and incidents ==
Three people were killed in a mid-air collision in 2000. The AAIB report in part concluded that "The collision occurred because the pilots of both aircraft did not see the other aircraft in sufficient time to take effective avoiding action".

On Sunday, 9 May 2010, a light aircraft crashed into a car at the airfield and burst into flames a few seconds after the collision. The two vehicle occupants were not injured and were able to pull the pilot free from the aircraft. The pilot had initiated a go-around after aborting the landing attempt due to turbulence, and had then lost full directional control of the aircraft. The report by the Air Accidents Investigation Branch noted that the accident occurred after the pilot attempted to avoid a collision with tall trees and a potential crash on top of parked aircraft, having by then only very limited control of the plane. However the cause was not wholly conclusive due to the extent of the impact and the subsequent fire damage and as such stated that "a pre-impact anomaly could not be entirely excluded".

== Past residents ==
The following squadrons were here at some point:

- No. 1 Squadron RAF (1944)
- No. 2 Squadron RAF
- No. 4 Squadron RAF
- No. 17 Squadron RAF (1939)
- No. 25 Squadron RAF (1940)
- No. 26 (South African) Squadron RAF
- No. 29 Squadron RAF
- No. 33 Squadron RAF (1944)
- No. 39 Squadron RAF
- No. 44 (Rhodesia) Squadron RAF
- No. 46 Squadron RAF (1940)
- No. 56 Squadron RAF (1939 & 1940 & 1941)
- No. 63 Squadron RAF
- No. 66 Squadron RAF (1944)
- No. 71 (Eagle) Squadron RAF (1941)
- No. 72 Squadron RAF
- No. 74 Squadron RAF (1944)
- No. 111 Squadron RAF (1940 & 1941)
- No. 116 Squadron RAF
- No. 121 (Eagle) Squadron RAF (1942)
- No. 124 (Baroda) Squadron RAF (1942 & 1943)
- No. 127 Squadron RAF (1944)
- No. 130 (Punjab) Squadron RAF
- No. 151 Squadron RAF (1940)
- No. 168 Squadron RAF
- No. 222 (Natal) Squadron RAF (1942)
- No. 234 (Madras Presidency) Squadron RAF (1944)
- No. 242 (Canadian) Squadron RAF (1941 & 1942)
- No. 249 (Gold Coast) Squadron RAF (1940-41)
- No. 257 (Burma) Squadron RAF (1940)
- No. 268 Squadron RAF
- No. 275 Squadron RAF
- No. 285 Squadron RAF (1945)
- No. 287 Squadron RAF
- No. 288 Squadron RAF
- No. 301 Polish Bomber Squadron
- No. 304 Polish Bomber Squadron
- No. 310 (Czechoslovak) Squadron RAF (1944)
- No. 312 (Czechoslovak) Squadron RAF (1944)
- No. 313 (Czechoslovak) Squadron RAF (1944)
- No. 331 (Norwegian) Squadron RAF (1942 & 1944)
- No. 332 (Norwegian) Squadron RAF (1942 & 1944)
- No. 403 Squadron RCAF (1942)
- No. 412 Squadron RCAF (1942)
- No. 486 Squadron RNZAF (1942)
- No. 601 (County of London) Squadron AAF
- No. 604 (County of Middlesex) Squadron AAF (1939-40)

Units;

- No. 1 Aircraft Delivery Flight RAF
- No. 2 Fighter Command Modification Centre
- No. 4 Concealment and Decoy Unit
- No. 9 Personnel Despatch Centre
- No. 12 (RNZAF) Personnel Reception Centre
- No. 17 Armament Practice Camp RAF
- No. 19 (Fighter) Wing RAF
- No. 34 Air Stores Park
- No. 128 (Reconnaissance) Wing RAF
- No. 129 Gliding School RAF (??-1948)
- No. 130 Airfield Headquarters RAF
- No. 132 (Norwegian) Airfield Headquarters RAF became No. 132 (Norwegian) (Fighter) Wing RAF
- No. 134 (Czech) (Fighter) Wing RAF
- No. 142 Gliding School RAF
- No. 404 (Fleet Fighter) Flight RAF
- No. 419 (Special Duties) Flight RAF (1940-??)
- No. 1494 (Target Towing) Flight RAF (??-1945)
- No. 2703 Squadron RAF Regiment
- No. 2704 Squadron RAF Regiment
- No. 2715 Squadron RAF Regiment
- No. 2723 Squadron RAF Regiment
- No. 2729 Squadron RAF Regiment
- No. 2733 Squadron RAF Regiment
- No. 2759 Squadron RAF Regiment
- No. 2777 Squadron RAF Regiment
- No. 2779 Squadron RAF Regiment
- No. 2794 Squadron RAF Regiment
- No. 2811 Squadron RAF Regiment
- No. 2819 Squadron RAF Regiment
- No. 2830 Squadron RAF Regiment
- No. 2840 Squadron RAF Regiment
- No. 2878 Squadron RAF Regiment
- No. 4018 Anti-Aircraft Flight RAF Regiment
- No. 4021 Anti-Aircraft Flight RAF Regiment
- Aviation Candidates Selection Board
- Battle of Britain Flight RAF
- Combined Selection Centre
- Essex Sector HQ RAF
- Fighter Command Modification Centre
- Fighter Command Radar School
- Metropolitan Sector HQ RAF
- Sub Stratosphere Flight

== See also ==
- Airports of London
