= No. 332 Squadron RNoAF =

332 Squadron Royal Norwegian Air Force No. 332 (Norwegian) Squadron Royal Air Force
- Active: 15 Jan 1942 – 21 Nov 1945; 21 Nov 1945 – Present
- Country: Norway; United Kingdom (1942-45)
- Allegiance: (Norway) Norwegian Government in exile (1942-45)
- Branch: Royal Norwegian Air Force; Royal Air Force (1942-45)
- Role: Fighter
- Part of: 132 Luftving
- Base: Ørland Air Station
- Motto(s): Norwegian: Samhold i strid ("Together in battle")
- Aircraft: Lockheed Martin F-35A Lightning II

Insignia
- Squadron Badge heraldry: An axes's head
- Squadron Codes: WW (Apr 1939 – Sep 1939) (allocated but not used); HG (Jan 1942 – Feb 1942); AH (Feb 1942 – Nov 1945)

332 Squadron of the Royal Norwegian Air Force is an aircraft squadron. It traces its history, unbroken, to the establishment of No. 332 (Norwegian) Squadron Royal Air Force of the Second World War, formed in March 1942.

No. 332 Squadron of the Royal Air Force was formed at RAF Catterick in the North Riding of Yorkshire on 16 January 1942, as a Supermarine Spitfire-equipped fighter squadron manned by Norwegians.

== History ==
=== In World War II (1942–1945) ===
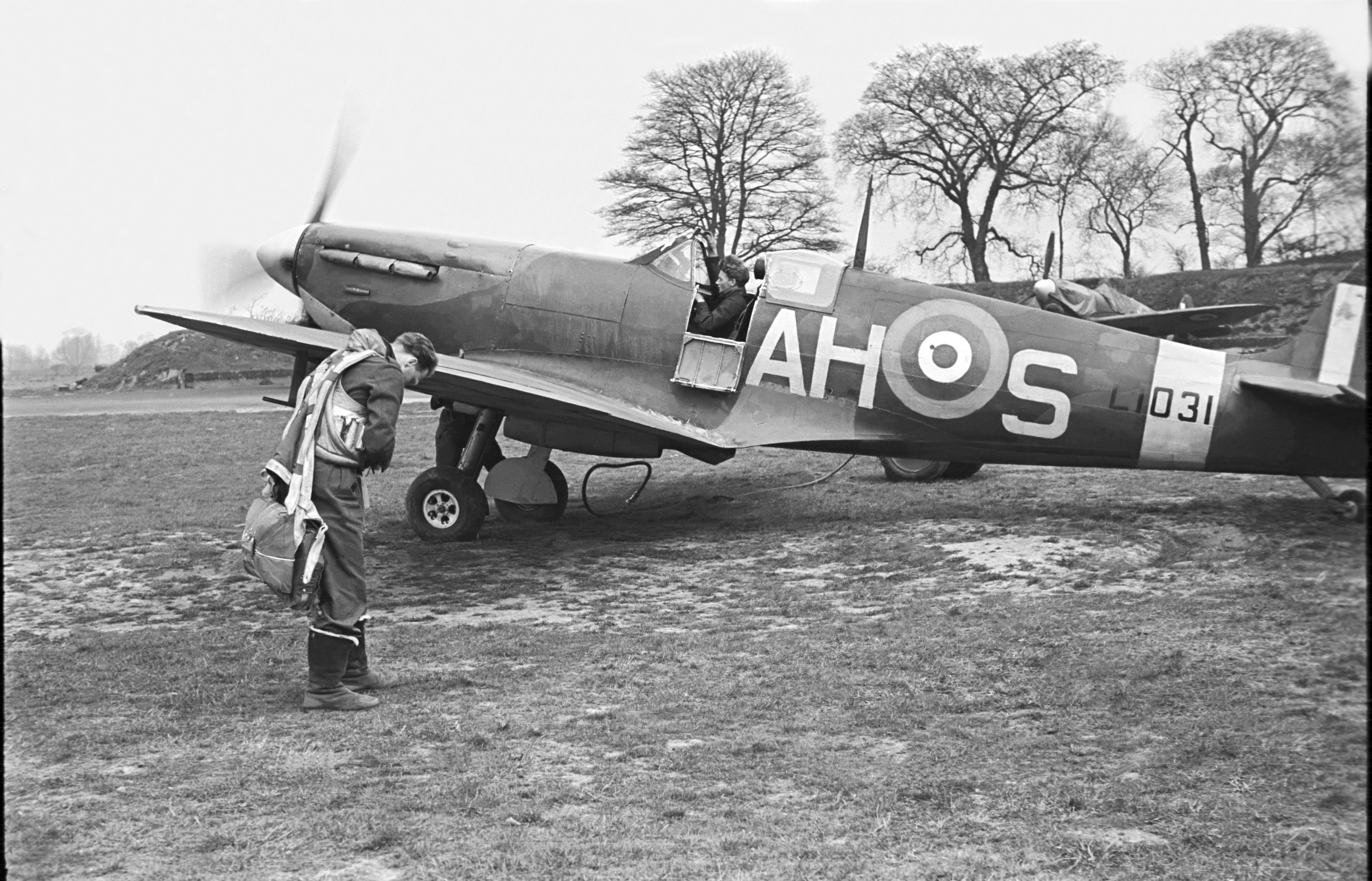
No. 332 Squadron Spitfire AH-S/L1031 at RAF Catterick

The squadron became operational on 21 March 1942, and moved on to RAF North Weald to operate alongside another Norwegian crewed squadron, No. 331 Squadron.

With squadron code "AH", No. 332 squadron became part of No. 132 Wing alongside Norwegian No. 331 Squadron. It operated as air cover for the Dieppe Raid, and later flew fighter sweeps and escort operations over occupied France and the Low Countries. In late 1943/early 1944 both squadrons were transferred to the 2nd Tactical Air Force and participated in the Normandy Landings as fighter-bombers and tactical air superiority fighters. From September onwards No. 132 Wing participated in the liberation of the Netherlands.

In April 1945, the squadron was transferred to Scotland, and the following month transferred to Norway after the German surrender. On 21 September 1945, the squadron was disbanded at Værnes as an RAF unit and passed to the control of the Royal Norwegian Air Force (RNoAF). During the war between them, No. 331 and No. 332 Squadrons scored many air victories: 180 confirmed destroyed, 35 probables and more than 100 damaged. Combined losses were heavy as well: 131 aircraft lost with 71 pilots killed.

=== In the Royal Norwegian Air Force (1945–present) ===
In honour of its achievements during World War II, the Royal Norwegian Air Force has maintained its RAF squadron names. Thus, the RNoAF still has the fighter units 331 Squadron and 332 Squadron. Today, the Norwegian 332 Squadron is based at Ørland Air Station where it operates the Lockheed Martin F-35A Lightning II.

== Notable pilots ==
- Sgt Per Bergsland (Captured August 1942)
- Sgt Carl Sejersted Bødtker (April 1943)
- Sgt Jan Staubo
- Cpt Finn Thorsager
- Lt Soren Kjell Liby
- Lt Marius Eriksen
- Gunnar Piltingsrud
- Fnr Ola Gert Aanjesen
- Maj Reidar Emil From
- Otto Grieg Tidemand - later Norwegian Minister of Defence 1965-70

== Aircraft operated ==
Aircraft operated include:

- Supermarine Spitfire VA (January 1942 – April 1942)
- Supermarine Spitfire VB (April 1942 – November 1942; May 1943 – June 1943)
- Supermarine Spitfire IXB (November 1942 – April 1945)
- Supermarine Spitfire IXE (April 1945 – 1952)
- Republic F-84G Thunderjet (1953 – 1957)
- North American F-86F Sabre (1957 – 1962)
- North American F-86K Sabre (1962 – 1964)
- Northrop F-5A Freedom Fighter (1966 – 1973)
- Fokker (GD) F-16A Fighting Falcon (1980 – 2001)
- Fokker (GD) F-16AM Fighting Falcon (2001 – July 2016)
- Lockheed Martin F-35A Lightning II (November 2017 – present)

== See also ==
- List of Royal Air Force aircraft squadrons
