= No. 331 Squadron RNoAF =

Squadron of the Royal Air Force

331 Squadron Royal Norwegian Air Force No. 331 (Norwegian) Squadron Royal Air Force
- Active: 21 Jul 1941 – 21 Nov 1945; 1945 – 1951; 1952 – 2022; 2023 – present
- Country: Norway; United Kingdom (1941-45)
- Allegiance: (Norway) Norwegian Government in exile (1941-45)
- Branch: Royal Norwegian Air Force; Royal Air Force (1941-45)
- Role: Fighter
- Part of: RAF Fighter Command, 2nd Tactical Air Force (1943-45)
- Garrison/HQ: Ørland Air Station
- Mottos: Norwegian: For Norge ("For Norway")
- Equipment: Lockheed Martin F-35A Lightning II

Insignia
- Squadron Badge heraldry: Two swords in saltire, enfiled by an amulet
- Squadron Codes: FN (Jul 1941 – Nov 1945)

331 Squadron of the Royal Norwegian Air Force is an aircraft squadron. It traces its history, unbroken, to the establishment of No. 331 (Norwegian) Squadron Royal Air Force of the Second World War, formed in July 1941.

No. 331 Squadron RAF was a Second World War squadron of the Royal Air Force. The squadron was primarily manned with Norwegian aircrew. The squadron was part of RAF Fighter Command between 1941 and March 1944 when it joined the 2nd Tactical Air Force until the end of the war. The squadron took part in the Dieppe Raid and the Normandy landings.

== History ==
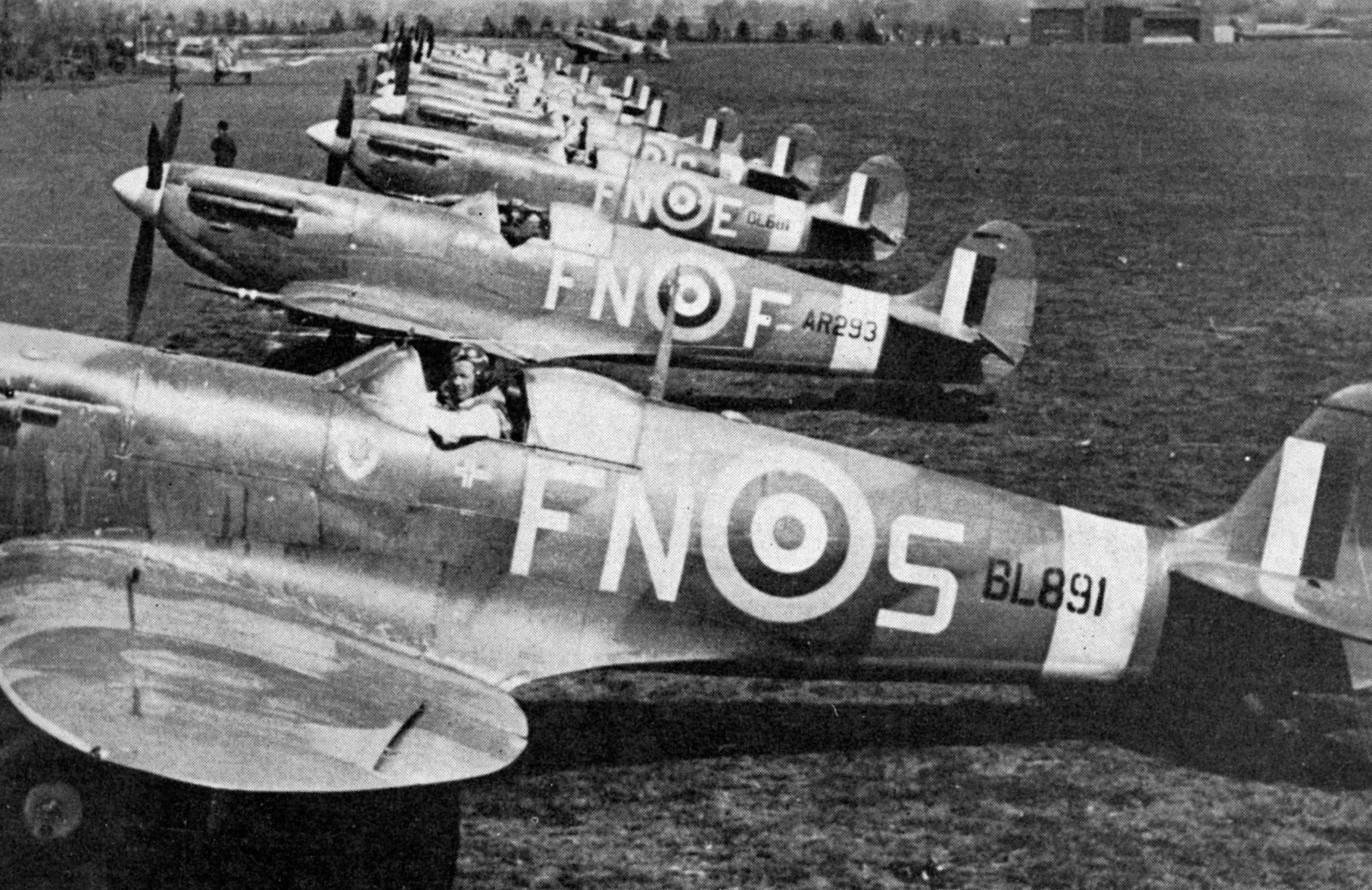
Spitfire Vs of No. 331 Squadron, spring 1942

It was formed as a fighter squadron at RAF Catterick in Yorkshire on 21 July 1941. The squadron was manned by exiled Norwegians, except for the ground crew and the commanding officer.

It was given the RAF aircraft code prefix "FN", which was often said to be an abbreviation for "First Norwegian" or "For Norway", the latter being the squadron's official motto (in Norwegian For Norge). The squadron badge was two Norwegian Viking swords in saltire, bound together with a ring

The squadron was initially equipped with Hawker Hurricane Is, inherited from a Polish RAF unit. These had to be rebuilt before 331 Squadron could become operational, on 15 September 1941. It provided defence for northern Scotland, moving to RAF Castletown on 21 August and later to RAF Skeabrae.

On 4 May 1942, the squadron moved south to RAF North Weald, having re-equipped with the Supermarine Spitfire IIA in November 1941.

331 Squadron was joined by a second Norwegian unit 332 Squadron, also flying Spitfires. Together they were known as North Weald Wing and were part of the Allied air umbrella over the landing area in the Dieppe Raid, and later flying fighter sweeps and escort operations over occupied France and the Low Countries.

In November 1943, 331 and 332 Squadrons were transferred to the RAF Second Tactical Air Force and became known as No. 132 (Norwegian) Airfield Headquarters within No. 84 Group RAF; later No. 132 (Norwegian) (Fighter) Wing RAF.

Following fighter bomber and tactical air superiority operations, connected to preparations for D-Day and the actual landings in France, the squadron moved to Caen, Normandy, in August 1944. From September onwards, 132 Wing participated in the liberation of the Netherlands and provided air support for the crossing of the Rhine.

On 22 April 1945, the squadron was transferred to RAF Dyce in Scotland, where 331 and 332 Squadrons converted to Spitfire Mark IXe and Mk XVI.

Following the end of the war, the wing flew to Norway and on 22 May 1945, 331 Squadron was officially disbanded as an RAF unit, with control passed to the re-formed Royal Norwegian Air Force (RNoAF) on 21 November 1945.

According to the British embassy in Oslo, No. 331 (Norwegian) Squadron defended London from 1941 and was the highest scoring fighter squadron in South England during the war. The squadron was given the RAF aircraft code prefix "FN" - or "For Norway".

Between them during the war, 331 and 332 Squadrons scored 180 confirmed destroyed, 35 probables and more than 100 damaged. Combined losses were 131 aircraft lost with 71 pilots killed.

In honour of the achievements of the Second World War squadrons, the RNoAF has maintained RAF squadron names, including a 331st Fighter Squadron, now flying F-35A Lightning IIs and based at Ørland Air Station.

== All aircraft operated by No.331 Sqn ==
- July – August 1941 Hawker Hurricane I
- August – November 1941 Hawker Hurricane IIB
- November 1941 - April 1942 Supermarine Spitfire IIA
- April - October 1942 Supermarine Spitfire VB
- October 1942 - April 1945 Supermarine Spitfire IXB
- April 1945 - November 1945 Supermarine Spitfire IXE
- 1951 Squadron deactivated
- 1952 Republic F-84 Thunderjet
- 1957 North American F-86 Sabre
- 1963 Lockheed F-104 Starfighter
- 1981 General Dynamics F-16 Fighting Falcon
- 2023 Lockheed Martin F-35A Lightning II (Late 2023 – present)

== RAF bases ==
- July–August 1941: RAF Catterick
- August–September 1941: RAF Castletown
- September 1941-May 1942: RAF Skeabrae
- May–June 1942: RAF North Weald
- June–July 1942: RAF Manston
- July–August 1942: North Weald
- August 1942: Manston
- August–September 1942: North Weald
- September 1942: RAF Ipswich
- September–October 1942: North Weald
- October 1942: Manston
- October 1942-January 1944: North Weald
- January 1944: RAF Llanbedr
- January–March 1944: North Weald
- March 1944: RAF Southend
- March 1944: North Weald
- March–June 1944: RAF Bognor
- June–August 1944: RAF Tangmere
- August 1944: RAF Funtington
- August 1944: RAF Ford
- August–September 1944: Villons les Buissons (B.16)
- September 1944: Camp Neuseville (B.33)
- September 1944: Lille/ Wambrechies (B.57)
- September–October 1944: RAF Fairwood Common
- October–December 1944: Grimbergen (B.60)
- December 1944-February 1945: Woendrecht (B.79)
- February–March 1945: Schijndel (B.85)
- March–April 1945: Fairwood Common
- April 1945: Schijndel (B.85)
- April 1945: Enschede (B.106)
- April–May 1945: RAF Dyce
- May–November 1945: Gardermoen - detachment at Stavanger

== See also ==
- List of Royal Air Force aircraft squadrons
