= Ørland Main Air Station =

Military base in Trøndelag, Norway

- Ørland hovedflystasjon
- Brekstad, Trøndelag in Norway
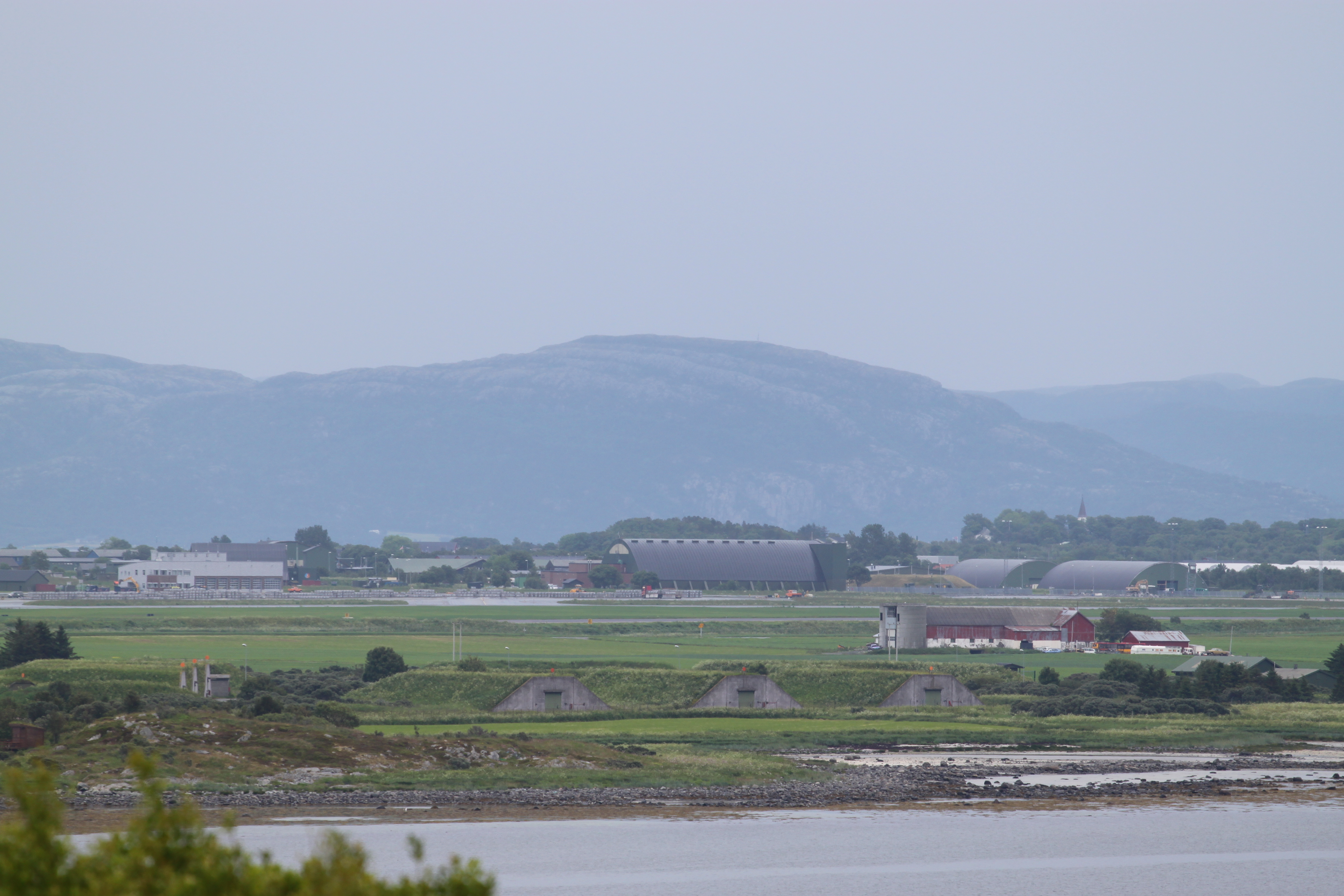
- A view from the east over Ørland Main Air Station during 2011

Site information
- Type: Military airfield
- Owner: Ministry of Defence
- Operator: Royal Norwegian Air Force
- Condition: Operational

Location
- Location in Norway
- Coordinates: 63°41′56.1″N 9°36′14.4″E

Site history
- Built: 1941
- In use: 1941 – present

Garrison information
- Garrison: 132 Air Wing

Airfield information
- Identifiers: IATA: OLA, ICAO: ENOL, WMO: 012410
- Elevation: 9.1 metres (30 ft) AMSL
Runways
Direction	Length and surface
15/33	3,278 metres (10,755 ft) Asphalt
- Airfield shared with Ørland Airport; Source: Aeronautical Information Publication Norway

Ørland Main Air Station (IATA: OLA, ICAO: ENOL) (Norwegian: Ørland hovedflystasjon) is situated at the mouth of the Trondheimsfjorden in Ørland Municipality in Trøndelag county in the center of Norway. Ørland is operated by the Royal Norwegian Air Force and is an important air base not only for Norway, but also for NATO. The air station is the base of F-35A Lightning II, AgustaWestland AW101 search and rescue helicopters and a location for E-3A Sentry AWACS. It is also the host of many NATO exercises.

== Operations ==
Air Wing 132 is stationed at the main air station. Under it are most operations at the air station, including 331 Squadron, 332 Squadron, air defence squadron, base defence battalion, maintenance- and logistics units.

Other units represented are 330 Squadron (SAR helicopters), Cyber Defence Force and Defence Logistics Organization.

Ørland is the only air station on the Scandinavian Peninsula that has ground handling equipment for the E-3A Sentry AWACS (Airborne Warning and Control System). It is considered a forward operations location (FOL), but not a base for these aircraft.

There is also a detachment of AgustaWestland AW101 search and rescue helicopters from the 330 Squadron at Sola Air Station to assist any emergency at sea or in other unreachable places.

== History ==
=== World War II ===
Ørland Main Air Station was built by the prisoners of war (mostly Serbs, Russians and Poles) exploited by the occupation forces in 1941 during the German occupation of Norway. The Germans wanted an airfield so that they could interdict the Allied convoys to Murmansk. At first, German Focke-Wulf Fw 200 Condors were stationed here. In June 1942, a squadron of Junkers Ju 87 Stukas rebased here, later a squadron of Messerschmitt Bf 109s and then a squadron of Focke-Wulf Fw 190 fighters.

The Germans decided to expand the airfield and built a second runway in 1944. This was later made the main runway. The Germans then made several taxiways and started planning a third runway. However, the war ended before the plans could be completed. 7000 Germans were stationed at Ørlandet during the war, with about 10 000 prisoners of war used as the work force. This meant that, at the end of the war, the Germans left a fully armed, defended airfield with docks, infrastructure and a cannon taken from the battleship Gneisenau.

=== Post war ===
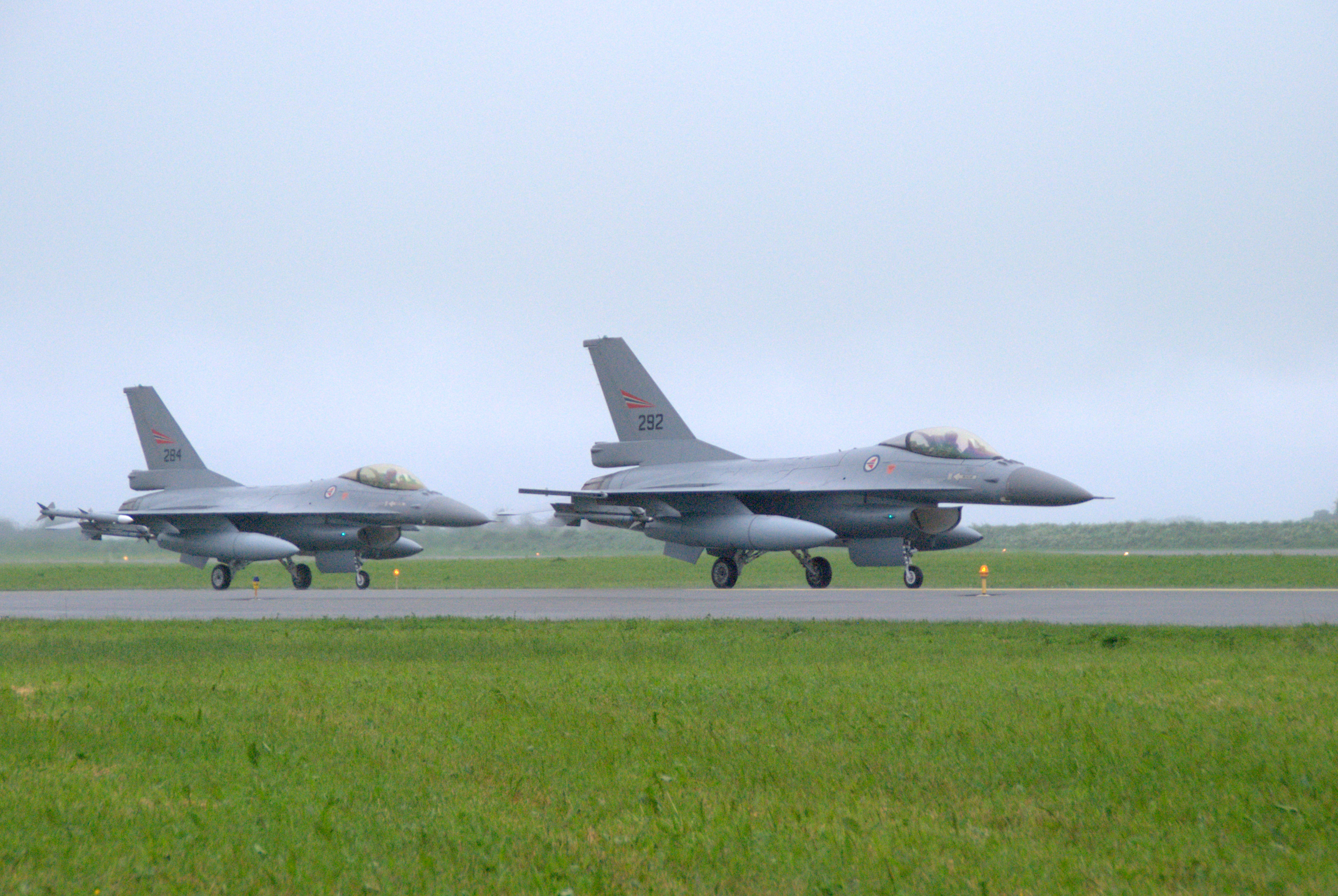
Two RNoAF F-16s at Ørland hovedflystasjon during NATO Tiger Meet 2013

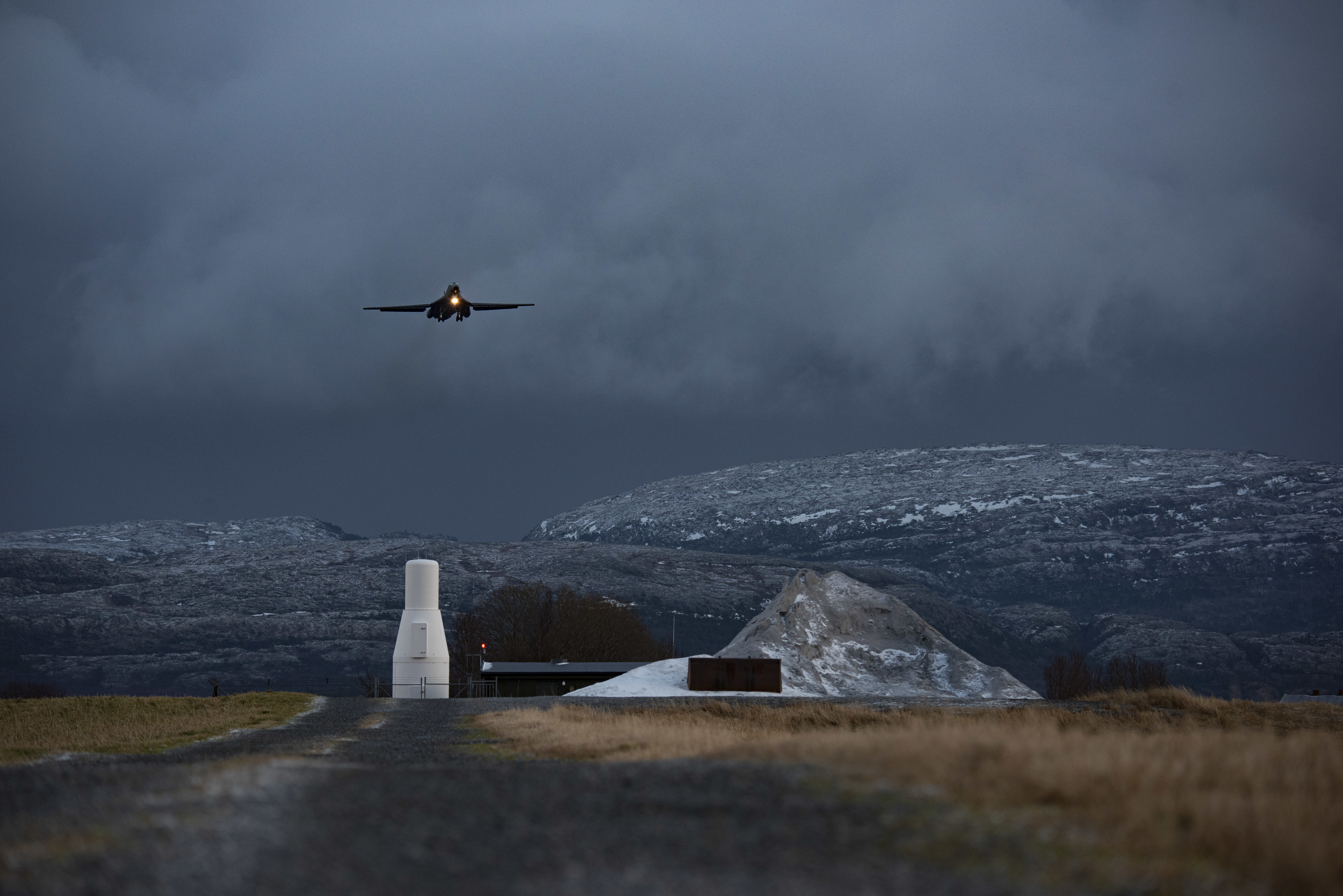
B-1B bomber landing at Ørland in 2021

After the war, a Norwegian Spitfire squadron was stationed here, but in 1946 the airfield was closed. All buildings were torn down and the wood transported to northern Norway to help rebuild Finnmark which the Germans had left in ruins. After that, the airfield was used for sporadic exercises.

It wasn't until 1950 that the government decided that the airfield should be made a permanent deployment-airfield. In 1952, a new runway had been made, and in 1954, it was expanded to handle NATO forces. It was then the airfield got today's looks. In October 1954, Squadron 338 was rebased from Sola and remains as the only fighter force at the airfield. In the summer of 1958, the SAM battery was established, and in August 1970, the detachment from Squadron 330 arrived. In November 1983, the airfield was customized to handle the NATO E-3A AWACS which routinely visits from Geilenkirchen air base to sustain the surveillance chain at the NATO border.

In February 2012 a proposition was passed in Stortinget which will make Ørland the principal air base of Norway and also replacing Bodø. The decision to move the other air station Bodø to Ørland is mainly due to the retreat from Cold War-era practices and the incorporation of the new F-35 Lightning II jet fighter into the Royal Norwegian Air Force which were recently ordered by the Norwegian government from Lockheed Martin. Beginning in 2012 the air base hosted the NATO trials for its joint technological interoperability exercises.

Ørland Main Air Station has facilities and stored equipment to receive United States Marine Corps fixed-wing aircraft which are maintained under the Marine Corps Prepositioning Program-Norway.

Between February and March 2021, the US Air Force deployed strategic bombers to Ørland as part of its Bomber Task Force Europe mission. Four B-1B Lancers and 200 personnel from 9th Expeditionary Bomb Squadron were deployed from Dyess Air Force Base in Texas.

== Based units ==
Units based at Ørland Main Air Station.

=== Royal Norwegian Air Force ===
- 132 Air Wing
  - 331 Squadron – F-35A Lightning II
  - 332 Squadron – F-35A Lightning II
  - Air defence battalion – NASAMS III
  - Base defense battalion
- 330 Squadron (Detachment) – AW101 SAR Queen

=== Joint services ===
- Norwegian Cyber Defence Force
- Norwegian Defence Logistics Organization

=== NATO ===
Supreme Allied Commander Europe

- NATO Airborne Early Warning & Control Force
  - Forward Operating Location – E-3A Sentry (periodic deployments)

== Civil Aviation ==
A local aviation club operates from the civil side of the airport.
