= Røros Flyservice =

Norwegian aircraft ground handling company

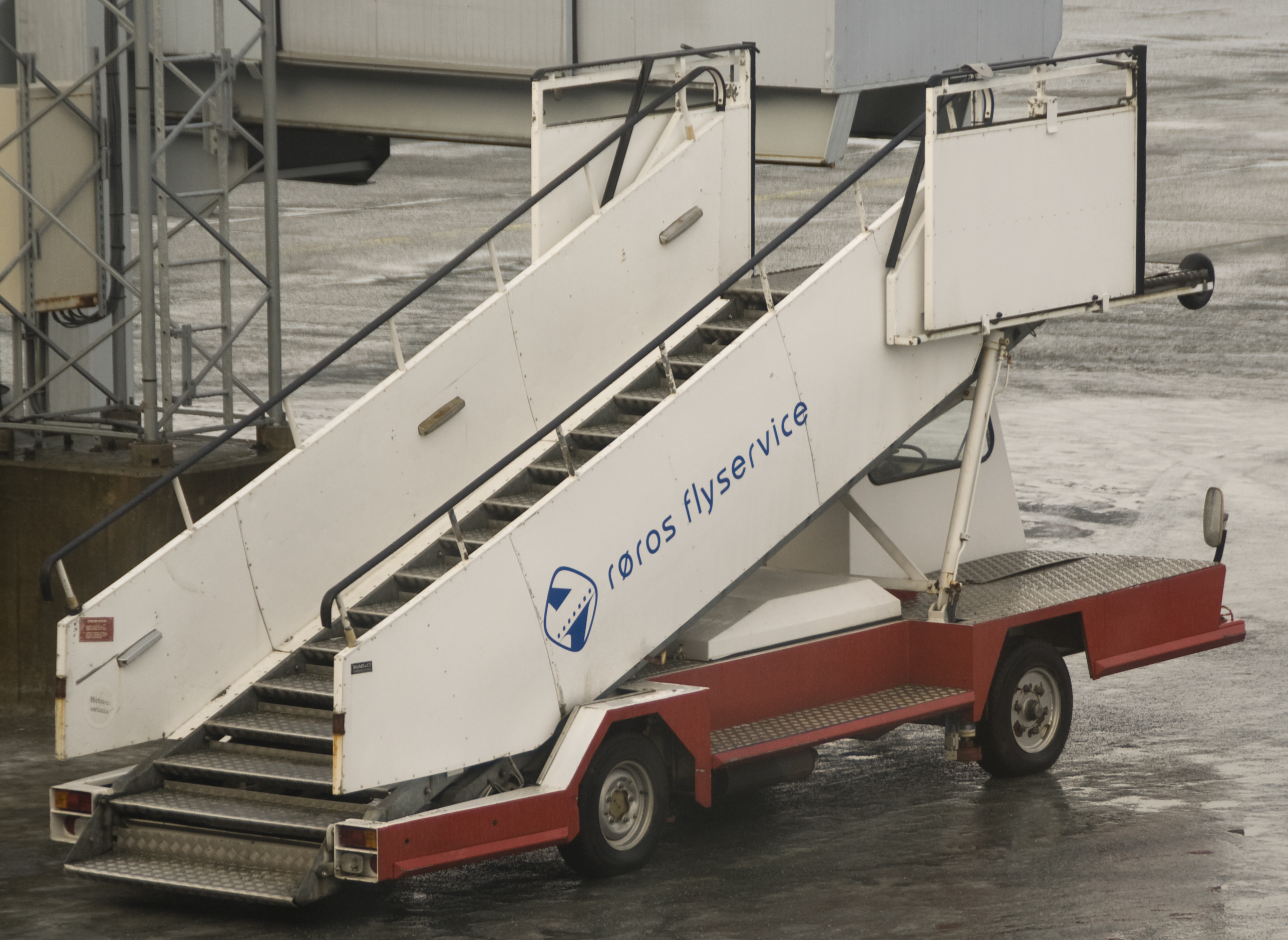
Ground handling equipment at Trondheim Airport, Værnes

Røros Flyservice AS is a Norwegian aircraft ground handling company operating at nine airports. Its main customer is Scandinavian Airlines, although it serves Amapola, SunExpress, SwiftAir and Air Baltic. The company also operates a travel agency.

The company was established in Røros on 1 April 2001, after Braathens terminated its services to the city. The company employed five former Braathens employees to work for the airlines taking over the route. In 2002, after many Braathens employees were fired after the Scandinavian Airlines take-over, Røros Flyservice started services in Trondheim Airport, Værnes to serve the new airline Norwegian Air Shuttle. The company expanded to Tromsø in 2004, to Bodø in 2006, to Oslo in 2007, to Bardufoss and Ålesund in 2008 and in Molde in 2009. In December 2010, Røros Flyservice was merged in to Aviator Airport Alliance. Only the station at Røros Airport still operated under Røros Flyservice brand, but under the company TRAVELNET Røros Flyservice.

== Airports ==
- Bardufoss Airport
- Bodø Airport
- Kristiansand Airport, Kjevik
- Kristiansund Airport, Kvernberget
- Molde Airport, Årø
- Oslo Airport, Gardermoen
- Røros Airport
- Tromsø Airport
- Trondheim Airport, Værnes
- Ålesund Airport, Vigra
