= Trondheim Airport =

International airport serving Trondheim, Norway

Trondheim Airport Trondheim lufthavn

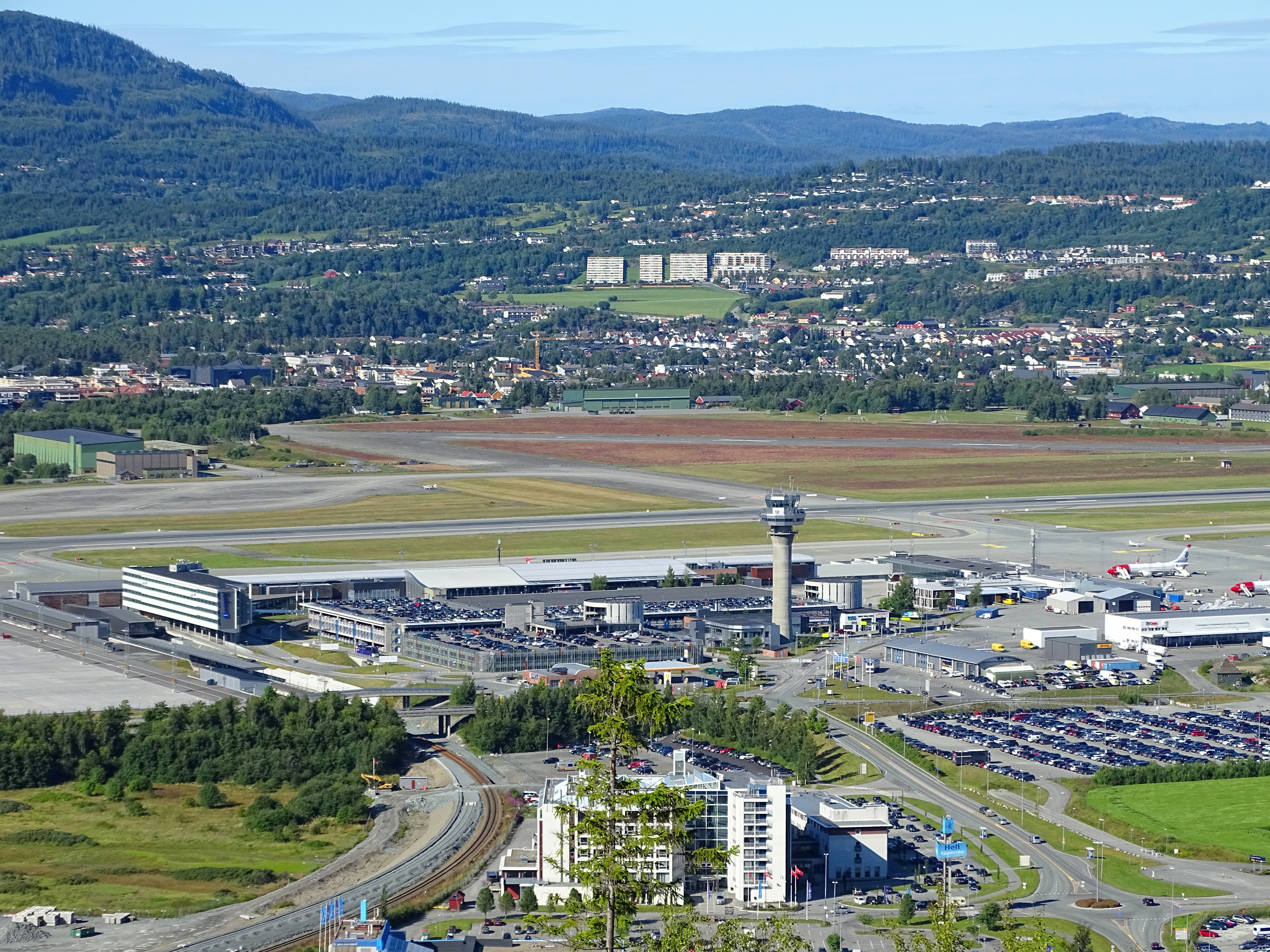
- IATA: TRD; ICAO: ENVA

Summary
- Airport type: Public / military
- Operator: Avinor
- Serves: Trondheim, Trøndelag, Norway
- Location: Værnes, Stjørdal, Trøndelag
- Focus city for: Norwegian Air Shuttle; Scandinavian Airlines; Widerøe
- Elevation AMSL: 17 m (56 ft)
- Coordinates: 63°27′27″N 010°55′27″E
- Website: Official website

Map
- Location within Norway

Runways
| Direction | Length | | Surface |
| Direction | m | ft | Surface |
|---|---|---|---|
| 09/27 | 3,000 | 9,839 | Asphalt |
| 14/32 | 1,472 | 4,829 | Asphalt/concrete |
| 18/36 | 1,275 | 4,183 | Concrete |

Statistics (2019)
- Passengers: 4,381,921
- Source: Norwegian AIP at Avinor; Statistics from Avinor

Trondheim Airport (Norwegian: Trondheim lufthavn; IATA: TRD, ICAO: ENVA), more commonly known as Værnes, is an international airport serving Trondheim and the surrounding areas in Trøndelag county, Norway. The airport is located in Værnes, a village in Stjørdal Municipality which is located 10 nautical miles (19 km; 12 mi) east of Trondheim Municipality. Operated by the state-owned Avinor, it shares facilities with Værnes Air Station of the Royal Norwegian Air Force. In 2018, the airport had 4,441,870 passengers and 58,273 air movements, making it the fourth-busiest in the country. The airport has two terminals; A dates from 1994 and is used for domestic traffic, while B is the renovated former main terminal from 1982, and is used for international traffic. The airport features a main east–west 2,999-metre (9,839 ft) runway, a disused northwest–southeast 1,472-metre (4,829 ft) runway, an integrated railway station and an airport hotel.

The main airlines at the airport are Scandinavian Airlines (SAS), Norwegian Air Shuttle and Widerøe, for all of which Værnes is a focus city. The main route is the service to Oslo, operated by Norwegian, SAS, and Widerøe, which is the fourth-busiest route in Europe and there are also some additional domestic services operated by Airbus A320, Boeing 737, Dash 8 and Embraer E2. In addition to Norwegian, SAS and Wizz Air, the airlines airBaltic, Finnair and KLM operate international routes out of Trondheim. Widerøe operates also with Dash 8 aircraft to six airports in Helgeland and Nord-Trøndelag on PSO-routes on behalf of the Norwegian state. In October 2020, Wizz Air had reported Trondheim and Oslo airports as their new bases in Norway, with daily flights from Trondheim to Oslo, Stavanger, Bodø and Tromsø; however the base in Trondheim was shut down in February 2021, resulting in frequency decrease. Some international services to Copenhagen and Stockholm is provided by SAS and to Amsterdam is provided by KLM. The airport also serves charter services, mainly to the Mediterranean. In total, it connects to 15 domestic and 15 international destinations, as well as 18 charter destinations.

Værnes was taken into use by the Royal Norwegian Army in 1887. The first flight was made in 1914, and aerodrome facilities were gradually installed. The first main installations, including three concrete runways, were built during World War II by the Luftwaffe. After the war, the Air Force Pilot School moved to Værnes, although in 1954 most of the other air force activities for Central Norway were moved to Ørland Main Air Station. Civilian aviation started in 1951, when half a barracks was taken into use as a terminal, with the whole building being utilized from 1958. Jet aircraft started serving Værnes from 1963, and the second terminal opened in 1965. The third (the current international Terminal B) was opened in 1982, and the fourth, Terminal A, was opened in 1994, along with the train station. From 1956 to 2004, Braathens was one of the largest airlines at the airport.

== Facilities ==
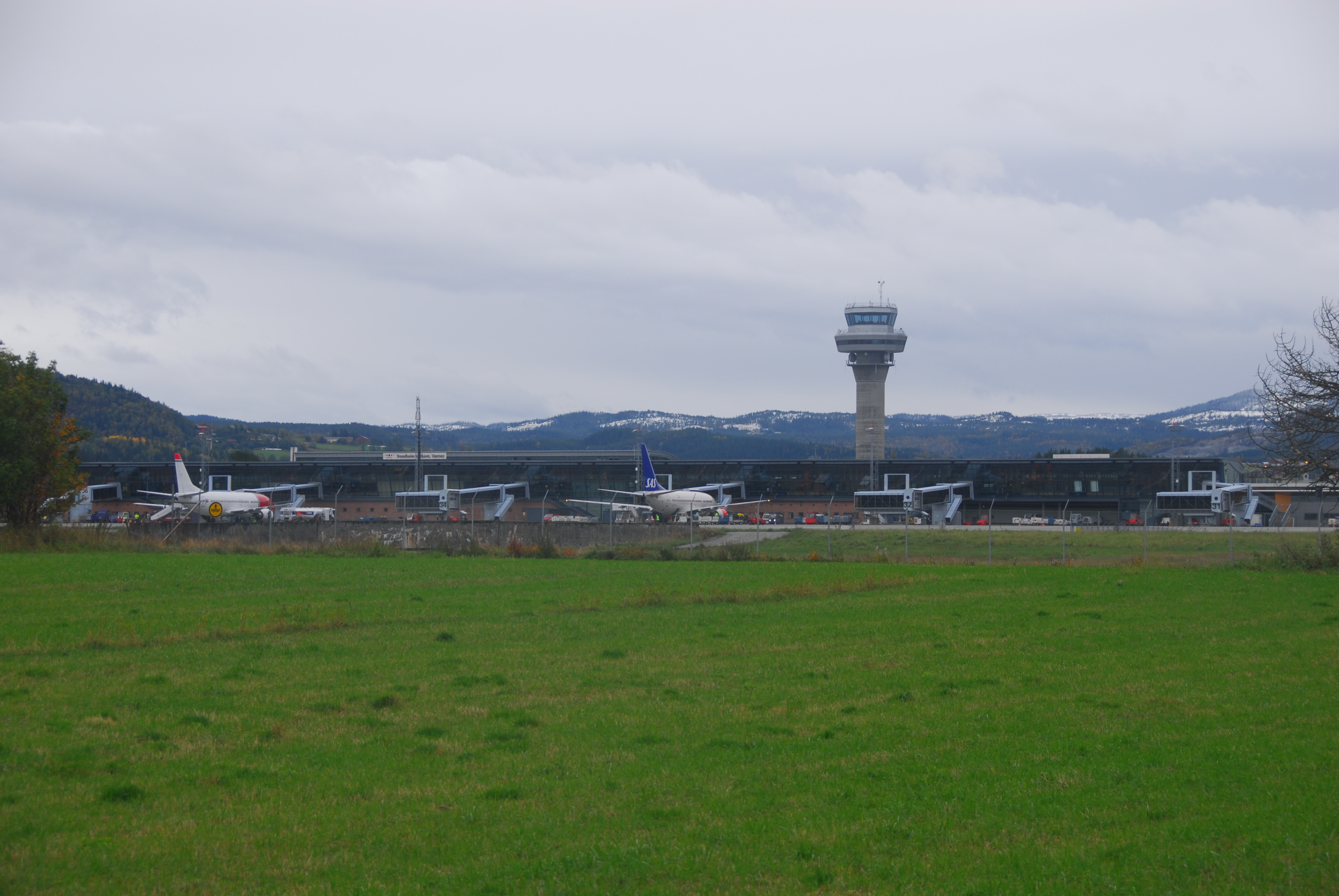
The five westernmost gates at Terminal A

Trondheim Airport is a joint military and civilian airport located in the municipality of Stjørdal in Trøndelag, with the northern part of the airport bordering the town of Stjørdalshalsen. To the west, the airport borders the Trondheimsfjord, and to the south the Stjørdal River. Combining the functions as an international, domestic and regional airport, it is located 10 nautical miles (19 km; 12 mi) east of Trondheim. Most of the airport area is owned by the Norwegian Ministry of Defence, although the civilian facilities and the air traffic control are owned and operated by Avinor, a subsidiary of the Norwegian Ministry of Transport and Communications.

=== Terminals ===
The civilian sector consists of two terminals—A and B—which combined are 20,000 square metres (220,000 sq ft), of which 13,500 square metres (145,000 sq ft) is passenger facilities. Terminal A is used for domestic traffic, while Terminal B is used for international services. The check-in facilities for domestic, international and charter are all fitted together at second floor at terminal A. The terminal contains an array of stores and dining places; these include a book store, convenience stores; clothing, crafts and cosmetics; diners, restaurants and pubs; and a 560 square metres (6,000 sq ft) duty-free store. The airport also has three automatic teller machines and a Radisson Blu hotel with 180 rooms and 11 conference rooms. Scandic Hell operates another hotel, the 400-room Rica Hell Hotel, within walking distance of the airport. The airport administration is located in Terminal B, while the administration for airlines and handling agents is located in annexes of Terminal A.

The terminal has stands for 24 aircraft, of which eight of sixteen at Terminal A have jetbridges. Four stands (two at each terminal is size code D, large enough for an Airbus A330 or a Boeing 757), while 20 are for size category C (large enough for an Airbus A320 or Boeing 737). Domestic jets normally use the seven jetbridge stands (gates 30–37), while the five non-bridged gates at Terminal A (gates 25–29) are used for domestic regional aircraft. International flights all use the eight non-bridged gates at Terminal B (gates 42–49). The Air Force has six stands for military freight planes up to the size of a Lockheed C-5 Galaxy (code F), although one is permanently used for deicing.

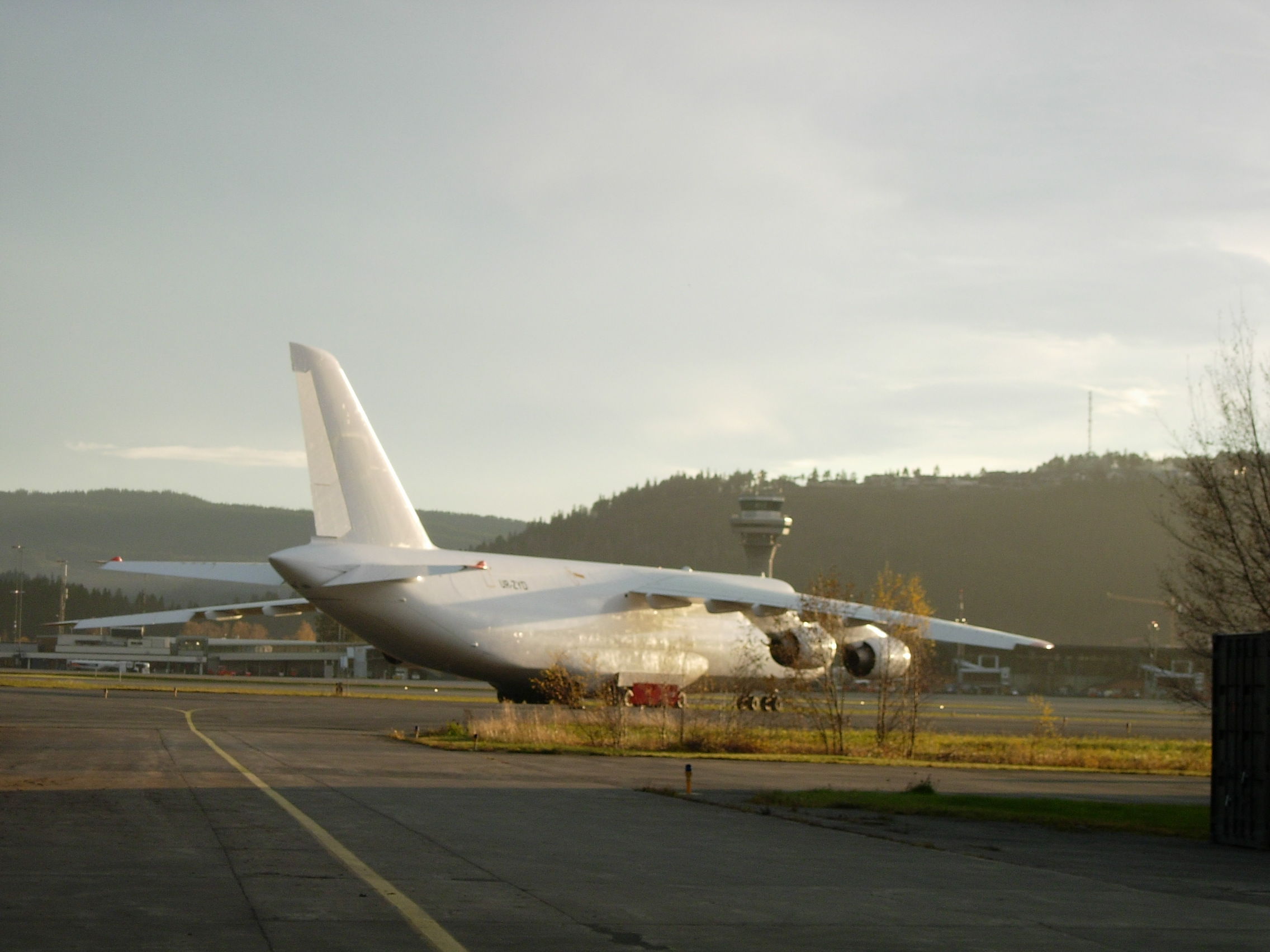
An Antonov An-124 Ruslan cargo aircraft parked at the military sector

=== Cargo, general aviation and VIP ===
Southeast of Terminal B is a collection of hangars and facilities belonging to various airlines. The largest is a 2,750 square metres (29,600 sq ft) hangar belonging to Scandinavian Airlines, dating from 1979, and a 1,440 square metres (15,500 sq ft) hangar from 1992 which is used by SAS Cargo. The airline also has two smaller buildings, at 200 and 300 square metres (2,200 and 3,200 sq ft). This area contains the main gate, which is also used for VIP passengers. There are six additional hangars, used by Helitrans (780 and 1,650 square metres or 8,400 and 17,800 square feet), built in 1984 and 1991, a 500-square-metre (5,400 sq ft) hangar belonging to Auticon, a 300-square-metre (3,200 sq ft) hangar belonging to Hilmar Tollefsen and two smaller hangars, one of which belongs to Værnes flyklubb. Værnes handles the largest amount of general aviation in Central Norway, including executive jets.

=== Runway and air control ===
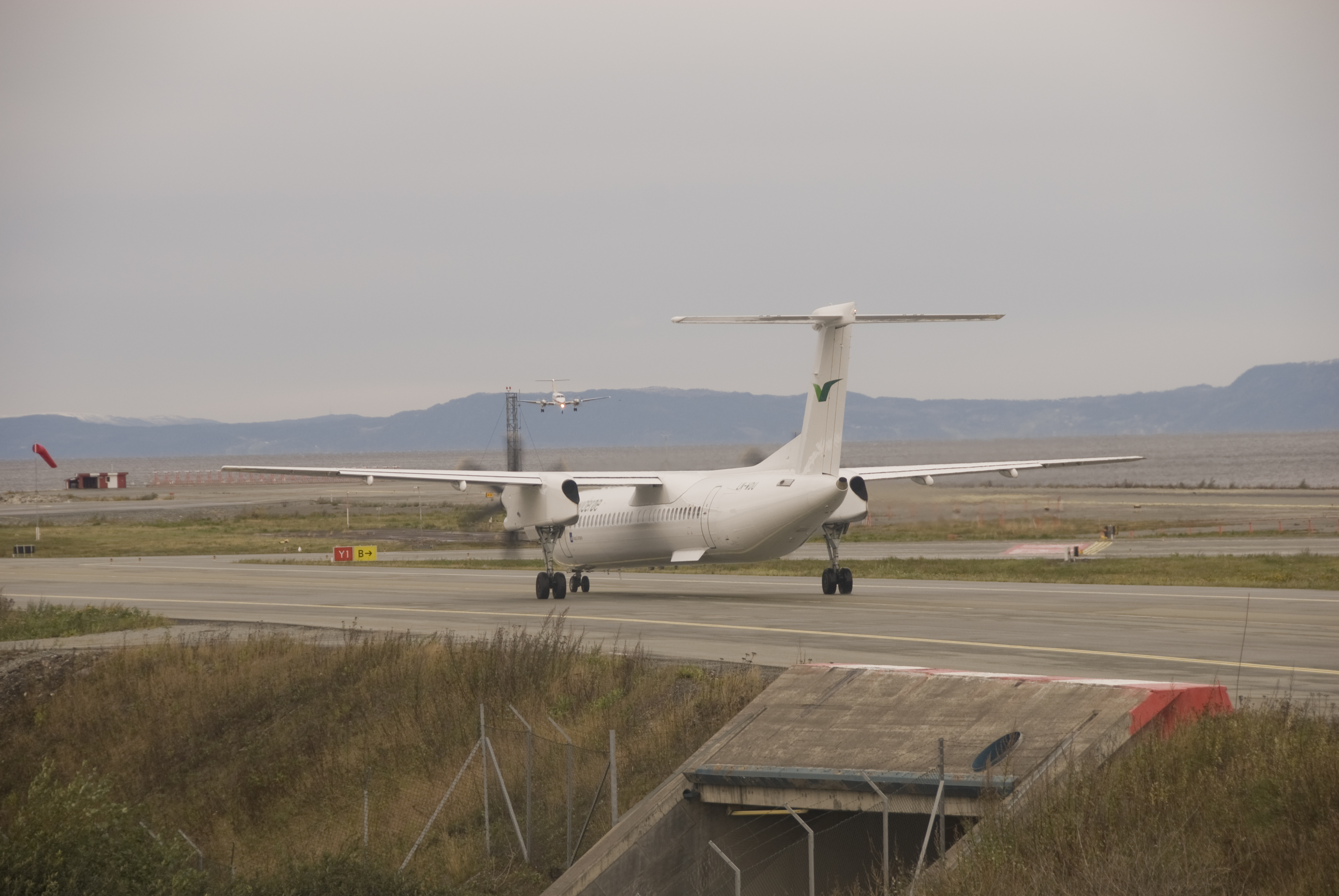
A Widerøe Dash 8 Q400 taxies while a Lufttransport Beechcraft King Air approaches Runway 09.

The main runway is 2,999 metres (9,839 ft) long, and runs east–west at 09/27. It is 45 metres (148 ft) wide, plus shoulders of 7.5 metres (25 ft) on each side. The runway is equipped with instrument landing system category 1. The main radar, a combined primary and secondary, is placed at Vennafjell, 9 nautical miles (17 km; 10 mi) south of the airport. Other radars are located at Kopparen, Tronfjell and Gråkallen. The taxiway runs parallel to the full length of the main runway. It is 23 metres (75 ft) wide, with 7.5 metres (25 ft) wide shoulders on each side. The center-distance between the runway and taxiway is 184 metres (604 ft), allowing simultaneous use by code E aircraft (such as Boeing 747). Værnes has a theoretical capacity of 40 air movements per hour, but this is reduced during bad weather, so the airport has a registered capacity of 25.

The airport also has a diagonal runway, which runs 14/32, roughly northwest–southeast. It is 1,035 metres (3,396 ft) long, plus end section of 293 metres (961 ft) on Runway 14 and 126 metres (413 ft) on Runway 32. The runway is closed for traffic, in part because of bad asphalt quality. The current control tower is 55 metres (180 ft) tall and dates from 2005.

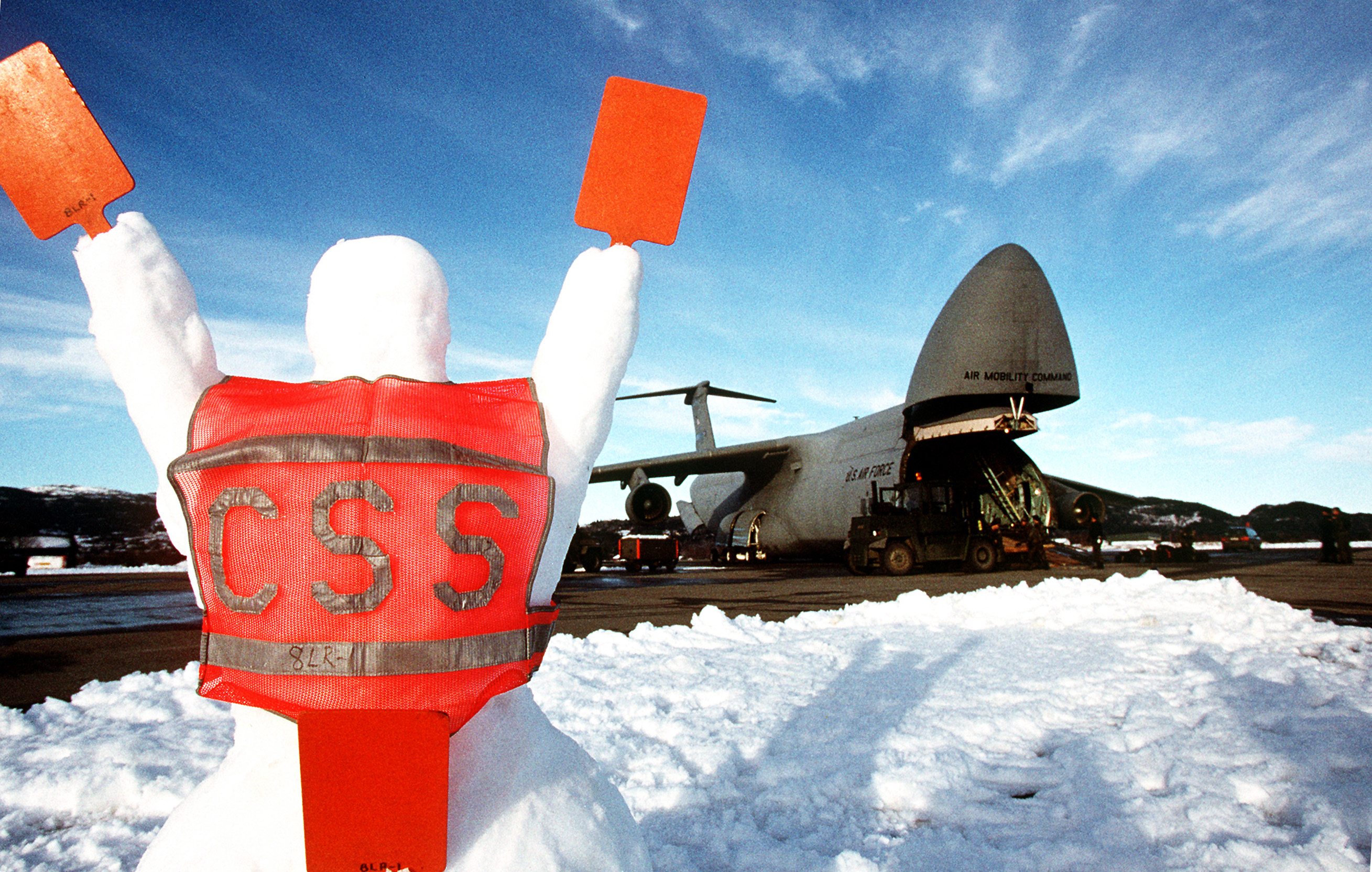
A United States Air Force C-5 Galaxy unloading cargo at Værnes Air Station

=== Military ===
Værnes Air Station is one of two air stations in Central Norway, the other being Ørland Main Air Station. There are no aircraft permanently stationed at Værnes, but the station serves the Home Guard, including its training center and the headquarters of the Trøndelag District (HV-12). Most of the military installations are located on the north side of the runway, although some are also located on the south side, to the east of the civilian terminal. Værnes also serves as a storage base for the United States Armed Forces as part of the Marine Corps Prepositioning Program-Norway. The military owns the runways and taxiways, but these are operated by Avinor. Three to four hundred military aircraft are handled at the air station each year. The military installations contain places for up to six aircraft of the size of a C-5 Galaxy and barracks to house 1,200 soldiers. The Ring Road connects the northern to the southern installations and passes the main runway on the east side.

== History ==
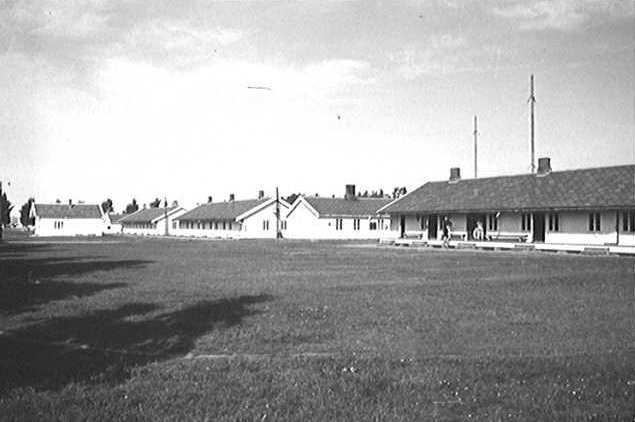
Værnes in 1936

=== Military establishment ===
Værnes is first recorded in the tenth century as the seat for one of eight chieftains in Trøndelag. The first military activity in the area was as a base for leidang. After the Viking Age, the farm at Værnes was taken over by the king and became the seat of the vogt. From 1671, the farm was owned by a series of military officers and public servants. In 1887, the farm was bought by the Royal Norwegian Army and converted to a camp. The first aircraft to use Værnes was a military Farman MF.7 Longhorn, which took off on 26 March 1914. It was part of the plan to establish the Norwegian Army Air Service, for which Værnes was chosen as the initial station for Central Norway. Radio equipment was installed in 1919 and the first hangar was built in 1920. By 1922, the grass field serving as runway has become insufficient for newer planes, both in terms of length and level, but an extension was not performed until 1925. In 1927, parliament passed legislation to move the division to Rinnleiret from 1930, but this was later annulled. With the delivery of Fokker aircraft in 1930, the runway was again upgraded and extended.

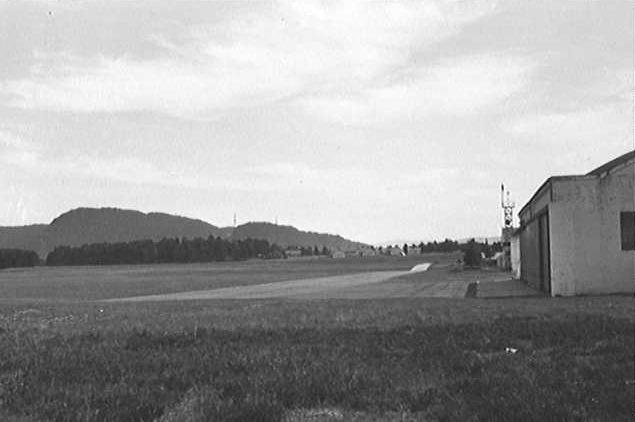
Værnes in 1936

Værnes was surrendered to Luftwaffe on 9 April 1940, during the German occupation of Norway. On 24 April 350 civilians started construction at Værnes, and within a few days 2,000 people were hired. On 28 April, a new 800 metres (2,600 ft) wooden runway was completed. The expansion was part of the plans for Festung Norwegen and was used as a bomber base for attacks on Northern Norway. By May, there were 200 aircraft stationed at Værnes. During the war, particularly in April 1940, the airport was subject to several bombings from the Royal Air Force (RAF). In June, work was started to clear the forests near the airport, and graves from the Viking Age were found. Construction was halted for several weeks while German and Norwegian archaeologists conducted research. In July, work started on building concrete runways, and by 1942 all three runways were finished. The east–west was made 1,620 metres (5,310 ft) long, the north–south was made 1,300 metres (4,300 ft) while the northwest–southeast was made 1,275 metres (4,183 ft) long. A number of taxiways were also constructed and a branch line of the railway was built to the hangars. By 1945, Luftwaffe had built about 100 buildings at Værnes. The land expropriated was estimated at between 1.6 and 3.0 square kilometres (0.62 and 1.16 sq mi). Luftwaffe had also finished the control tower that had been under construction since 1939.

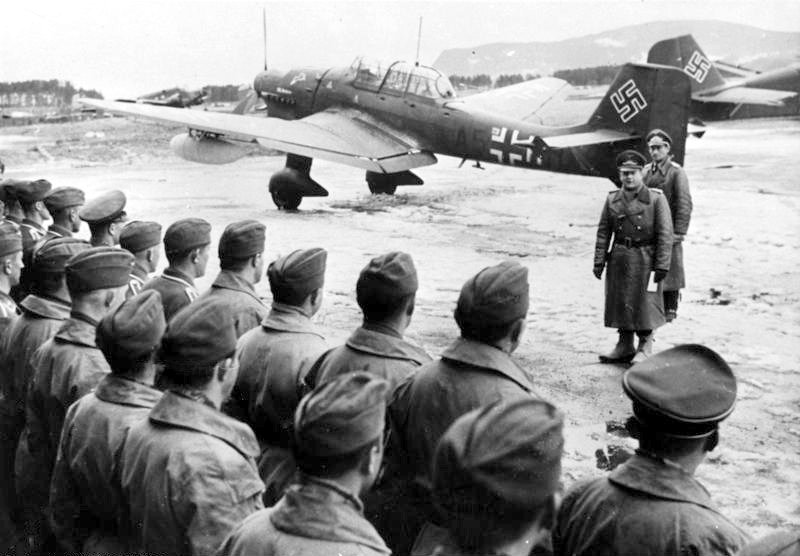
Erhard Milch visits Luftwaffe troops on 23 April 1940.

After the war ended, the airport was initial taken over by the Royal Air Force, but they soon withdrew leaving the Norwegian military in charge. Numerous squadrons, including 332, 331 and 337 were stationed at Værnes in the post-war years. In 1952, the pilot school was moved to Værnes, but in 1954 Ørland Main Air Station became the main air force base in Central Norway, and the majority of the armed air forces (with the exception of the school) moved to Ørland.

=== Previous airports ===
Civilian aviation in Trøndelag started in 1937, when Norwegian Air Lines (DNL) started seaplane services from Ilsvika and Jonsvatnet. These were terminated during World War II, but taken up again by the Royal Air Force and the Royal Norwegian Air Force during the summer of 1945. They were terminated in November due to the weather and RAF's withdrawal. The following year, DNL started services again, this time from Hommelvik. During winter, the route was not operated. The service was operated with a Short Sandringham flying boat to Oslo and Northern Norway, and a Junkers Ju 52 to Western Norway. The southbound and northbound Sandringhams and the Junkers all met at Hommelvik to exchange passengers. There was only room for two planes at the quay, so the third aircraft had to be anchored in the fjord. In 1947, the airport had 3,500 passengers. On 2 October 1948, the Bukken Bruse Short Sandringham crashed on landing, killing 19 people. In 1949, a reserve airport was built at Skogn, and people were transported from Hommelvik to Skogn along the Nordland Line in case the reserve airport was used. DNL became part of Scandinavian Airlines System (SAS) in 1951—the last year it used Hommelvik. Vestlandske Luftfartsselskap continued to use Hommelvik for an additional year. Braathens SAFE started their route from Oslo Airport, Fornebu via Hamar Airport, Stafsberg and Røros Airport on 18 August 1953. However, they chose to operate their de Havilland Herons from Trondheim Airport, Lade, just a few kilometers outside of the city center, in days with clear weather. Braathens SAFE moved all services to Værnes in 1956.

=== Civilian establishment ===
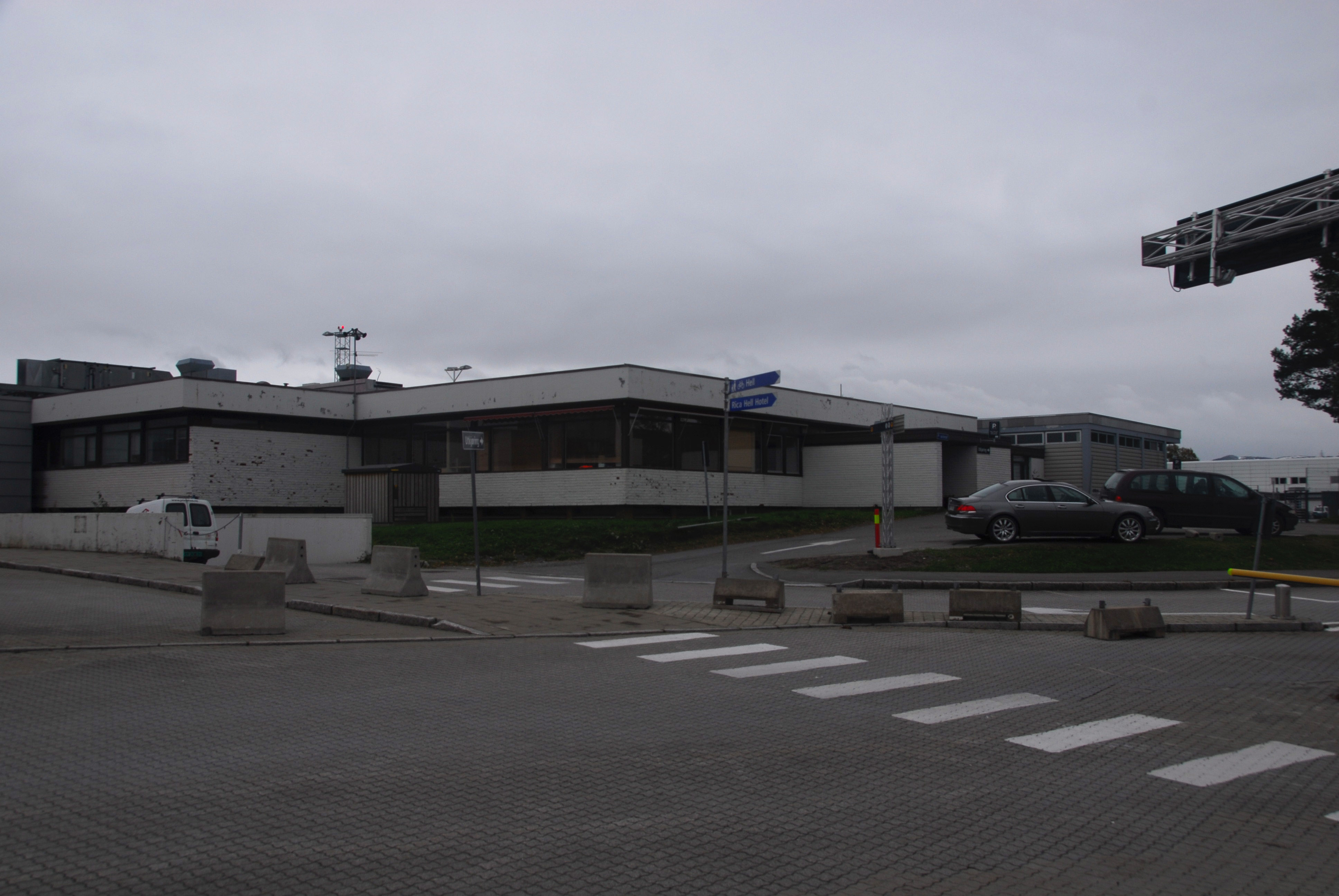
The second terminal, from 1965, as it appeared in 2009

After World War II, there was only general aviation at Værnes, organized by two clubs, Værnes flyklubb and NTH flyklubb. From 1 August 1946 to 31 July 1947, there were 1,221 take-offs from Værnes, mostly during the summer. During parts of 1946 and 1947, the airport was used as a pasture for sheep. The first scheduled service was introduced with a Douglas DC-3 operated to Oslo by DNL during the winter of 1947–48. While there were initially many customers, the lack of sufficient deicing caused low regularity and fewer customers through the season. The route was not reopened the following year.

The air traffic control at Værnes was established in 1946, after the air force had sent personnel to the United Kingdom for training. The Telecommunications Administration took over the responsibility for the radio installations, and the responsibility for the meteorological services became the responsibility of the Norwegian Meteorological Institute. Trondheim Air Traffic Control Center was also established to monitor all air space over Central Norway. In 1955, a glass dome was built on top of the control tower, giving a much better view of the air field.

Prior to World War II, Heimdal had been proposed as a location for the primary airport for Trondheim. Construction had started with drainage and ground works, but this work was interrupted by the war. Because of the large investments made to Værnes by Luftwaffe, a commission was established in 1947 to look into if Værnes or Lade instead should be selected. The commission was unanimous in recommending Værnes, highlighting that the airport was of a sufficient size to handle all civilian and military needs in the foreseeable future, and emphasized the proximity to the railway and highway. However, the commission recommended that Heimdal and Lade be kept as possibilities for future expansion. When the issue was discussed in Parliament, several members of the Standing Committee on Transport and Communications focused on the long distance to Trondheim, but the low investment needs (stipulated to NOK 1.3 million for necessary navigation and air control investments) convinced parliament, who passed legislation in favor of Værnes on 10 June 1952.

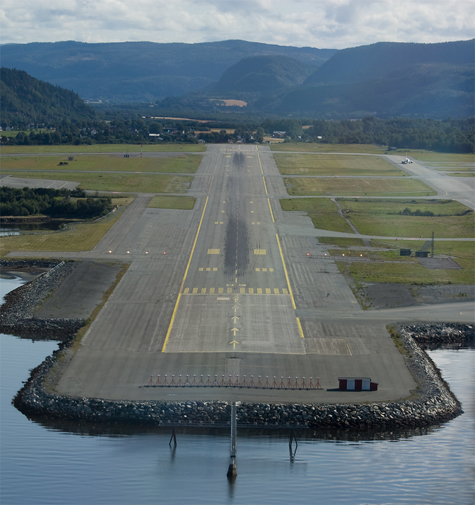
Runway 09; the civilian terminals are located to the right (south). The runway was extended to its current length in 1961, after artificial land had been built into the fjord.

In 1956, NATO approved the plans for Værnes to be financed through its infrastructure investment plan, after rejecting proposals for Heimdal. The costs were estimated at NOK 27.4 million and would allow the runway to be extended to support jet aircraft. Such an extension had already been done at Ørland Main Air Station, but NATO wanted to have two military air station of such dimensions in Central Norway. The east–west runway was to be extended to 2,400 metres (7,900 ft); initial proposals had called for the extension to occur on the east side, but the Ministry of Defence instead wanted the expansion of the fjord-side to reduce expropriation costs. This called for a complex civil engineering program, as the railway and highway would have to pass under the runway in tunnels and an artificial island would have to be built in the fjord and the mouth of the Stjørdal River be diverted.

SAS moved its seaplane services to Værnes in 1952, and two-year later started flying the route from Oslo Airport, Fornebu via Trondheim to Bodø Airport using Saab 90 Scandia aircraft. The first terminal was half a 100-square-metre (1,100 sq ft) barracks located beside a military hangar. In 1956, Braathens SAFE moved its services from Lade to Værnes, making the terminal too small for the needs. The whole barracks was taken into use in 1958, doubling the area. Braathens SAFE initially served flights to Trondheim from Oslo Airport, Fornebu with stop-overs at Hamar Airport, Stafsberg, and from 1957 at Røros Airport, using de Havilland Heron aircraft. Concession for the route from Bergen via the new Ålesund Airport, Vigra to Trondheim was granted to Braathens SAFE from 1958. Braathens SAFE then also started using Fokker F-27 turboprops, at first on the Oslo-route, but later also on the West Coast route. When they were taken fully into use, the service to Hamar was terminated.

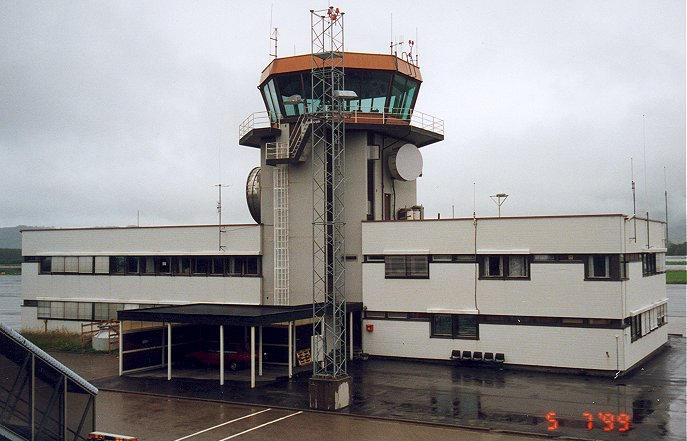
The old control tower in 1999, since demolished

In 1957, parliament started a new process to consider Heimdal as the primary airport, in part because the airlines and the Civil Aviation Administration stated that they felt Værnes was insufficient. However, higher costs—due to bad ground conditions and existing infrastructure at Værnes, valuated at NOK 150 million—caused parliament to support Værnes. Construction of the new runway therefore commenced in January 1959, with the work subcontracted to Selmer. First the artificial peninsula was built, then the delta of the Stjørdal River was moved, before a tunnel was built around the highway and railway. Finally, the runway could be built on top, and construction completed on 21 October 1961. In 1963, the airport had 115,000 passengers, increasing to 195,000 the following year. That year, SAS started using the Sud Aviation Caravelle jet aircraft on their route.

Parliament passed legislation for the construction of a new 2,000-square-metre (22,000 sq ft) terminal in 1964, which opened on 5 December 1965. the following year, Widerøe started a seaplane route from Værnes to Namsos, Rørvik, Brønnøysund, Sandnessjøen, Mo i Rana and Bodø. To serve the seaplanes, a quay was established at Hell. On 1 July 1968, four airports in Helgeland opened: Namsos Airport, Høknesøra, Brønnøysund Airport, Brønnøy, Sandnessjøen Airport, Stokka and Mo i Rana Airport, Røssvoll. These were served by Widerøe with the land planes de Havilland Canada DHC-6 Twin Otter. From 1 April 1967, Braathens SAFE was permitted to extend their West Coast service north to Bodø and Tromsø. Starting in 1969, Braathens introduced Boeing 737-200 jet aircraft on the Oslo services and Fokker F-28 jet aircraft on the West Coast services. In 1975, a third control tower was built, located right in front of (the yet to be built) Terminal A.

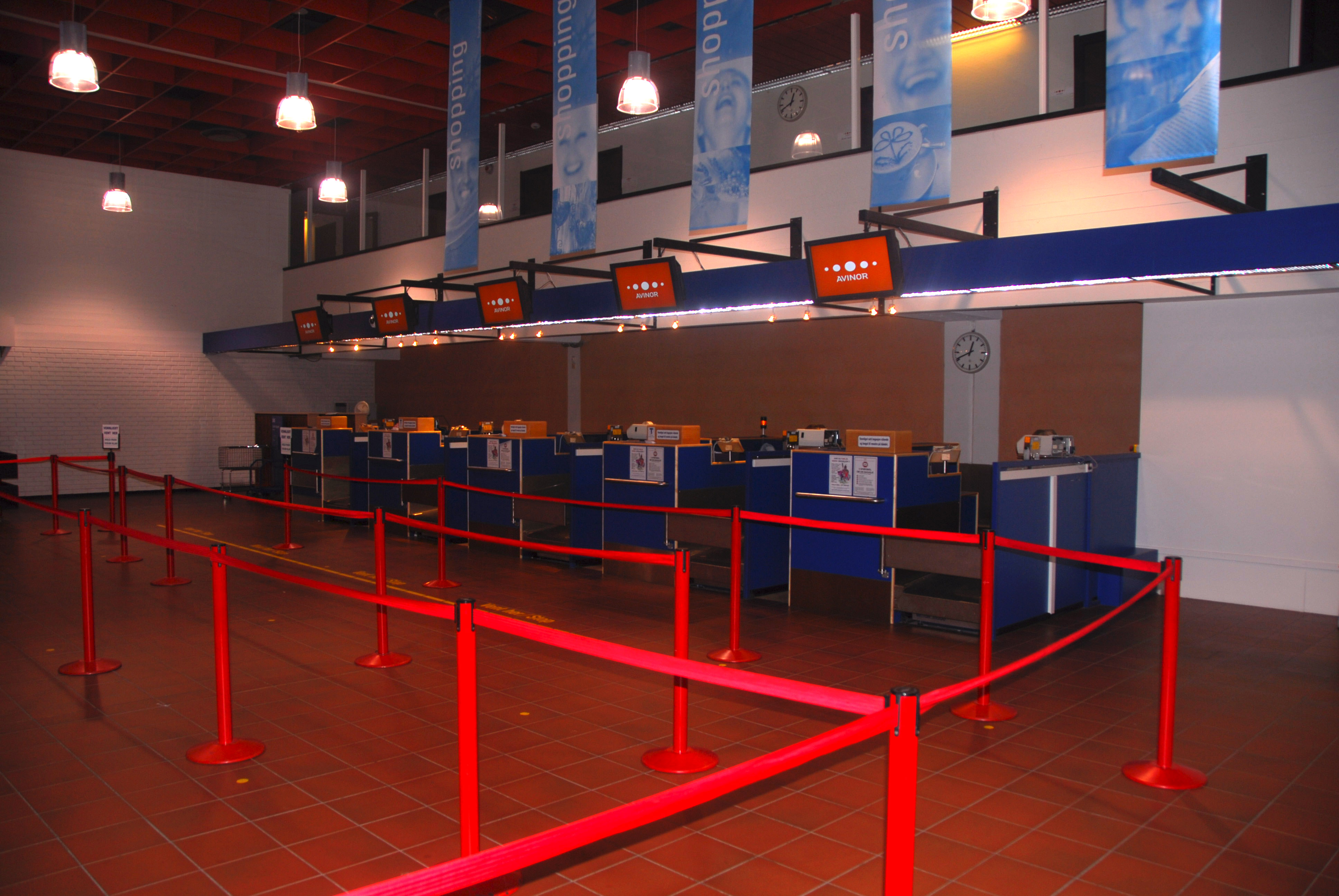
Old check-in at Terminal B. Last used for charter flights until 2013, it was the main check-in from 1982 to 1994.

In 1976, charter planes started operating to Trondheim, after a barracks was rebuilt to facilitate a border control. Several plans for a larger terminal were made, but these were delayed. In the late 1970s, the tarmac was expanded and a new taxiway built. Braathens SAFE opened a new 2,750 square metres (29,600 sq ft) hangar in 1979. The third terminal opened as an extension of the old one in May 1982. It was 5,500 square metres (59,000 sq ft) and the old terminal was converted to a cafeteria. Due to a heavy increase in traffic, the new terminal quickly became too small. During 1985 and 1986, a major overhaul of the main runway was made; it was dismantled and a new foundation and surface was laid. A number of new military buildings were constructed, along with six stands for large cargo aircraft and a new fuel system. In 1988, smaller adjustments, including new washrooms and longer baggage belts, were installed at the terminal. From 1986, Braathens SAFE retired its Fokker F-28, and the West Coast route to Molde was subcontracted to Busy Bee, who started to serve Værnes with their Fokker F-27, and later Fokker 50, aircraft. In 1992, SAS Cargo built a 1,440-square-metre (15,500 sq ft) facility. After Busy Bee's bankruptcy, the regional services were taken over by Norwegian Air Shuttle from 22 January 1993.

=== Fourth terminal and deregulation ===
The fourth and current domestic terminal was opened on 15 November 1994. With 15,000 square metres (160,000 sq ft) of floor space it had seven gates, of which five had jetbridges. The two remaining gates were fitted with jetbridges in July 2012. Værnes became the first airport in the Nordic countries with a train station in the terminal, when Trondheim Airport Station opened. In March 1996, the old terminal was named Terminal B and all international flights were moved there. A new taxiway, which extended the full length of the runway, was opened in 1999, after more artificial land has been created and a second tunnel built for the highway and railway.

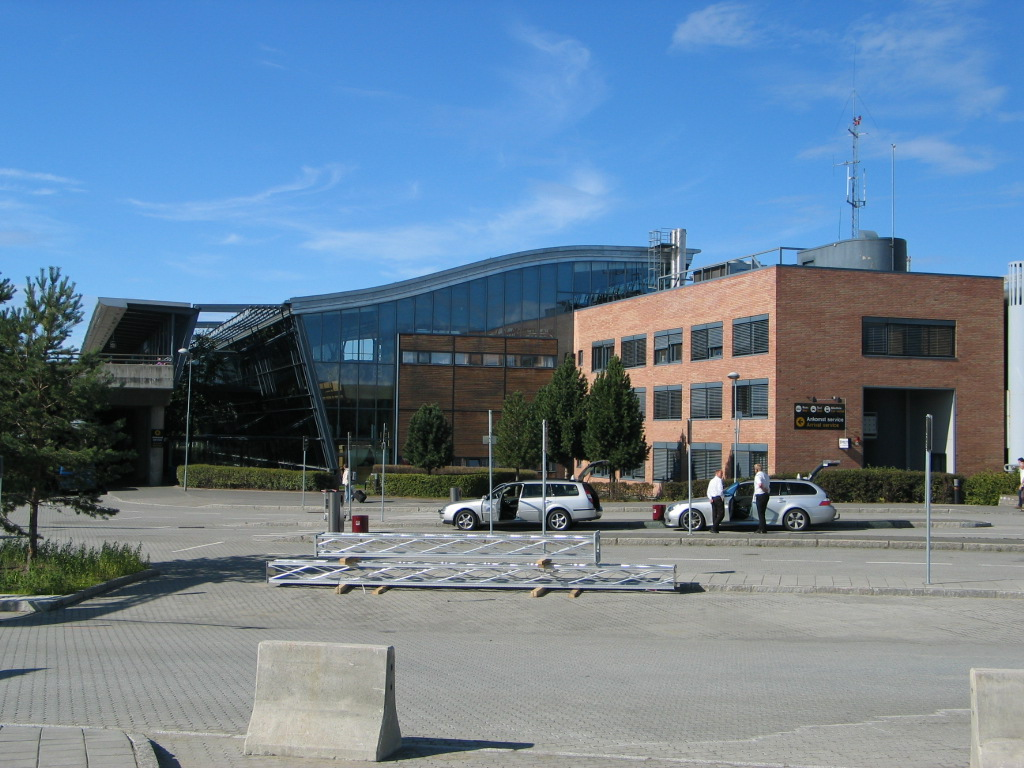
The new terminal

Oslo Airport, Gardermoen opened on 8 October 1998, replacing the congested Fornebu. For the first time, an airline could receive sufficient landing slots to challenge SAS and Braathens on domestic routes. The low-cost carrier Color Air was established, and started flights from Oslo to Trondheim using Boeing 737-300 aircraft. SAS and Braathens also saw the opportunity to increase the frequency on the route, and the three airlines between them introduced 39 daily flights. This made the route the fourth-busiest in Europe in terms of the number of aircraft. During this period, there were 84 daily departures to all destinations from Værnes. Color Air filed for bankruptcy on 27 September 1999, ending a price war which had cost the airlines NOK 3 billion.

By April 2000, the number of services by the main airlines was reduced to less than the level before the opening of Gardermoen, with 75 daily departures. Braathens had 33 daily departures, SAS had 22 and Widerøe had 20. Of Braathens' services, 14 were to Oslo, 15 to cities on the West Coast (of which four were operated by Norwegian Air Shuttle) and four were to Bodø, Harstad/Narvik and Tromsø. SAS operated 15 daily flights to Oslo, while eight were operated to Bodø, Harstad/Narvik and Tromsø. One flight was to their main hub in Copenhagen. This was the last year that SAS used DC-9s to Trondheim, phasing in Boeing 737 Next Generation aircraft, supplemented by occasional MD-80s. Widerøe had 15 daily flights to STOLports in Helgeland, and five flights to Sandefjord.

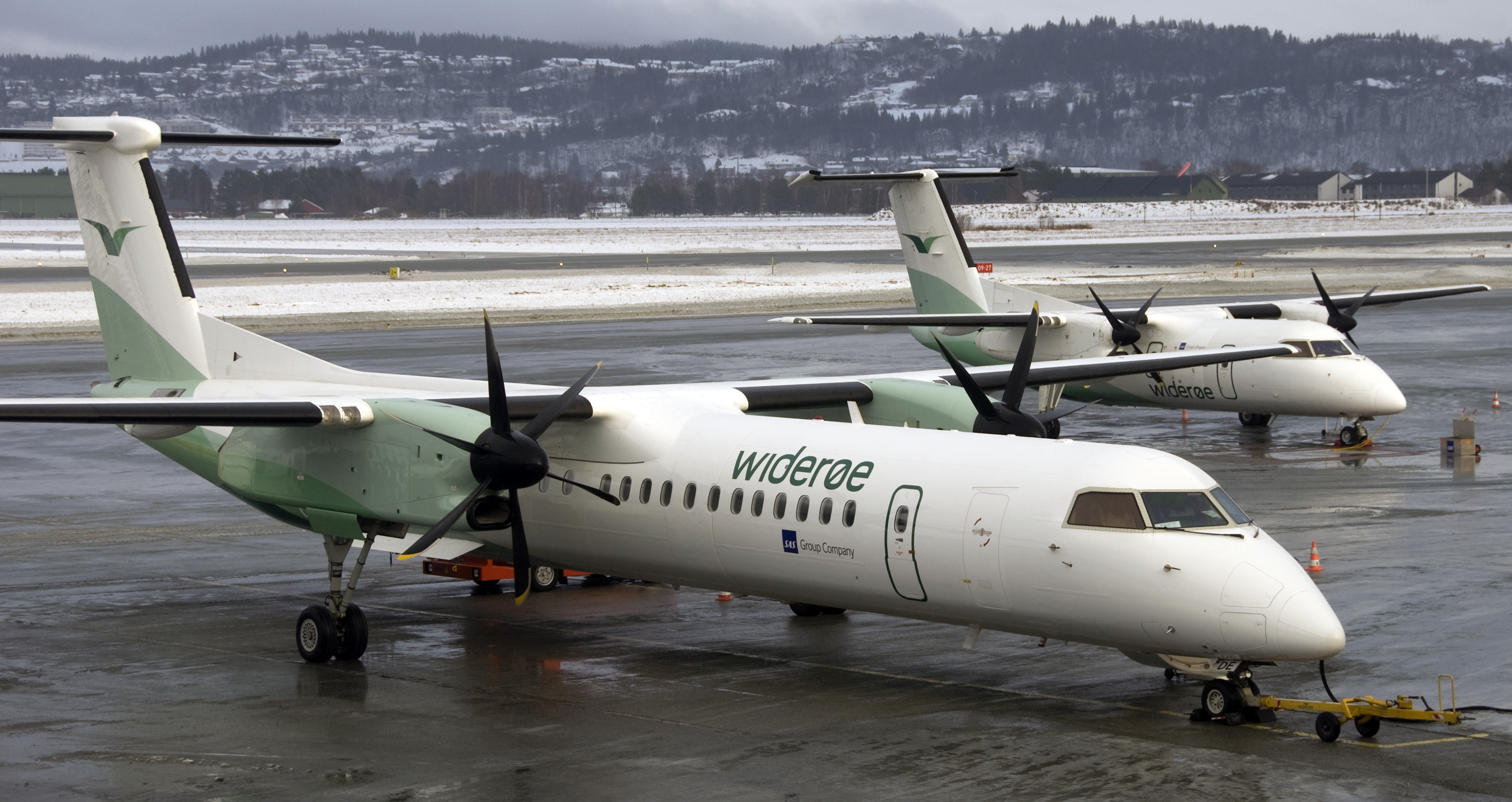
Two Widerøe Dash 8 aircraft at Terminal A; a Q400 used to Sandefjord and a -100 used to Mo i Rana

In 2002, SAS acquired Braathens, and the two companies coordinated their routes. All flights from Trondheim to Oslo-Gardermoen were taken over by SAS, who increased to 23 departures per day in each direction. This included a 30-minute headway from 06:30 to 09:30 and from 15:30 to 19:00. This made the route Trondheim–Oslo the busiest in the country. The routes northwards were taken over by Braathens, who increased to six daily trips to Bodø with connections northwards. The daily trip with Braathens to Harstad/Narvik was replaced by a two-round trips with SAS Commuter. Braathens retained the routes to the West Coast, with two flights to Ålesund and seven to Bergen. In addition, Norwegian Air Shuttle continued with two flights to Molde. In 2004, SAS and Braathens merged to form SAS Braathens. The airline changed its name back to Scandinavian Airlines in 2007.

From 1 September 2002, Norwegian Air Shuttle converted from a regional airline to a low-cost carrier and started competing on the route to Oslo. From 5 May 2003, Norwegian started a daily domestic service to Tromsø, from 17 April 2004, they introduced two weekly services to Prague, Czech Republic, and from 26 June to Dubrovnik, Croatia. From 30 October, Norwegian introduced one weekly flight to Murcia, Spain, from 4 November, they introduced five weekly services to London Stansted Airport, United Kingdom. In 2005, Terminal B received a major upgrade, increasing the passenger area with 1,000 square metres (11,000 sq ft). The airport was also rebuilt to 100% security control. The terminal received a new border control for flights to countries outside the Schengen Area and a duty-free store for both departing and arriving passengers. A new 55-metre (180 ft) tall control tower was also built.

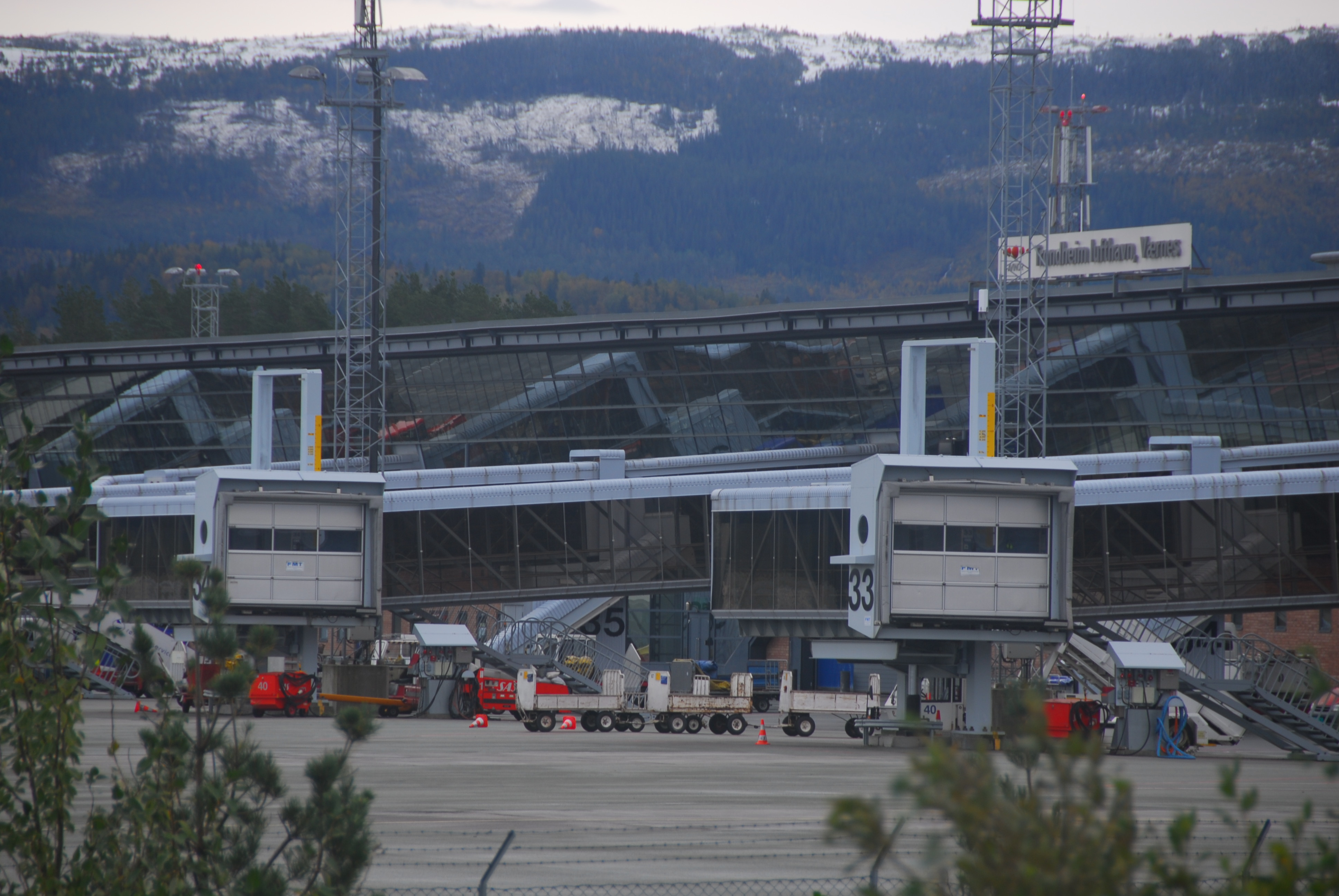
Gates 33 and 34 at Terminal A

From 7 January 2006, Norwegian started a seasonal winter service to Salzburg, Austria; from 7 May 2006, they introduced one weekly service to Nice, France; On 1 April 2008, they started two weekly round trips to Warsaw, Poland; and from 1 June 2008, Norwegian introduced one daily evening flight to Bodø and Tromsø. In 2009, a new indoor parking lot opened, with a capacity of 1,200 cars. It replaced a site with 225 parking places and cost NOK 125 million. The same year saw the opening of the Radisson Blu hotel, costing NOK 220 million, and a new fire station for NOK 80 million. From 31 October 2009, Norwegian started a weekly service to Las Palmas, Spain. On 31 January 2010, SAS operated its last service to Molde. To compensate, the Molde-based Krohn Air was established to start flights between Værnes and Molde Airport, Årø on 3 February, using Dornier 328 aircraft operated by Sun Air of Scandinavia. On 22 February 2010, Nextjet commenced two daily round trips to Åre Östersund Airport and Stockholm-Bromma Airport in Sweden. This connection ended during that year. Scandinavian already had flights to Stockholm. From 28 March 2010, Norwegian moved its three weekly services to London from Stansted to London Gatwick Airport. From 10 June to 30 August 2010, Icelandair operated two weekly services to their hub Keflavík International Airport using Boeing 757 aircraft.

Among international destinations operating in 2018 but not 2010 are Tallinn, Kraków and Gdańsk.

== Future ==
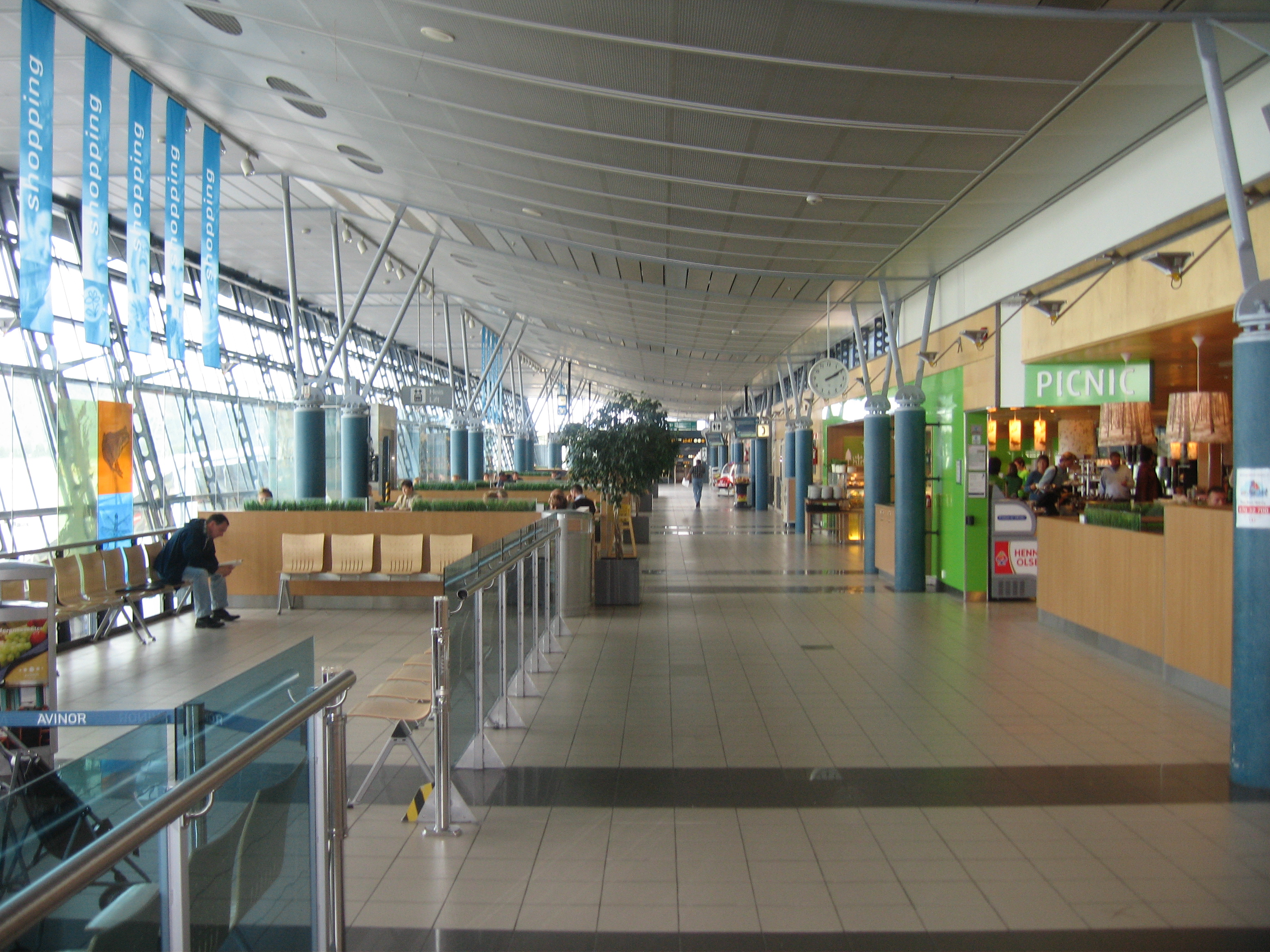
Departure area at Terminal A

In a master plan from 2006, Avinor has identified several key development issues to increase the capacity of the airport. For Terminal A, the plans call to keep the existing structure, and gradually expand it westwards, eventually passing over the railway on a culvert. Along the area between the railway and the highway, a south pier is planned to be constructed, with the inside facing immediately towards the railway and the outside having aircraft stands. In the short term, this is planned with six stands for regional aircraft, with a single-story building. The remaining stands currently used for regional aircraft will then be converted to international gates. While Avinor states that there is need for an expansion of Terminal B, no concrete solution has been found, in part because of the lack of space in the area, although this can partially be fixed by removing the general aviation from the area.

At both ends of the runway, the taxiway ends 150 metres (490 ft) from the start of the runway, forcing aircraft which need the full length to backtrack. An extension of the taxiways would help with this problem. Both at Terminal A and B, there will be a need for double taxiways. This will result in insufficient space for general aviation at its current location, and this has been proposed moved eastwards past the military installations. Several airlines, in particular Helitrans, has indicated need for more space. Proposals have been made to establish a heliport to allow flight to oil platforms on the Norwegian continental shelf. The military has suggested to fill in a large section of the river delta at the west end of the runway, and move some of the cargo and helicopter operations there, but environmental concerns have been raised by among others Avinor. The cost of establishing access to the artificial land is also high. By 2050, there may be need for a second, parallel runway to meet demand, and initial plans call for a 1,199 metres (3,934 ft) runway which would be used by general aviation, regional airlines and helicopters.

Between 2009 and 2011, Avinor extended the runway by 150 metres (490 ft) into the fjord. The masses used for this came from the construction of the nearby Gevingåsen Tunnel on the Nordland Line, which helped shorten the travel time of the airport rail link to Trondheim and increased frequency.

In 2016 some politicians suggested a name change to Hell International Airport, given that Æ could be less suitable in the name of an international airport with the same problem if using the name of municipality and nearby village of Stjørdal, so using the name of the nearest village Hell, which is easily writable on foreign keyboards, could be a good idea. A web vote on a newspaper site gave support for that. The name has not been changed (as of 2021), but in English the airport mostly calls itself "Trondheim Airport".

== Airlines and destinations ==
=== Overview ===
Widerøe is a regional airline and uses Dash 8 and Embraer E190 E2 aircraft to operate routes from south to north in Norway. Northwards, Widerøe uses Trondheim Airport as a hub to serve six airports in Nord-Trøndelag and Helgeland on public service obligation contracts with the Norwegian Ministry of Transport and Communications. Scandinavian Airlines is the airline with the most domestic services to Trondheim. The main route is to its hub at Oslo; additional services are operated to Bergen, Bodø, Stavanger and Tromsø, all with Airbus A320, Embraer E195 and CRJ900 aircraft. Internationally, it provides seasonally weekly flight to Alicante and Split, daily to its hub in Stockholm and 2-3 times daily flights to its hub in Copenhagen. Norwegian Air Shuttle is a low-cost airline which operates the main domestic services to Bergen and Oslo, using Boeing 737-800 and Boeing 737 MAX 8 aircraft. It provides a range of international flights. Most operate only a few times a week. Norwegian flies to eleven European destinations in eight countries.

KLM operates three daily flights to its hub at Amsterdam by its regional subsidiary KLM Cityhopper using Embraer E175/E190 and E195 E2 aircraft. Wizz Air operates 2-4 weekly international flights to Gdańsk using Airbus A320 and A321 aircraft. The airport is also served by numerous charter airlines.

Ground handling is provided by Aviator Airport Alliance, Widerøe Ground Handling.

=== Passenger ===
| Airlines | Destinations |
|---|---|
| Aegean Airlines | Seasonal charter: Chania, Rhodes |
| Finnair | Seasonal: Helsinki |
| Freebird Airlines | Seasonal charter: Antalya |
| Jettime | Seasonal charter: Larnaca |
| KLM | Amsterdam |
| Lufthansa | Frankfurt; Seasonal: Munich |
| Norwegian Air Shuttle | Alicante, Bergen, Kraków, London–Gatwick, Oslo; Seasonal: Gran Canaria, Nice, Riga, Split; Seasonal charter: Burgas, Chania, Gran Canaria, Larnaca, Palma de Mallorca, Rhodes |
| Scandinavian Airlines | Bergen, Bodø, Copenhagen, Oslo, Stavanger, Stockholm–Arlanda, Tromsø; Seasonal: Alicante, Split; Seasonal charter: Alicante, Burgas, Chania, Gran Canaria, Rhodes, Samos, Tenerife–South |
| Sunclass Airlines | Seasonal charter: Antalya, Chania, Gran Canaria, Larnaca, Palma de Mallorca, Rhodes, Tenerife–South, Varna |
| Widerøe | Ålesund, Bergen, Bodø, Brønnøysund, Harstad/Narvik, Mo i Rana, Mosjøen, Namsos, Rørvik, Sandefjord, Sandnessjøen, Stavanger, Tromsø; Seasonal: Oslo |
| Wizz Air | Gdańsk |

=== Cargo ===
| Airlines | Destinations |
|---|---|
| Amapola Flyg | Oslo |

== Statistics ==
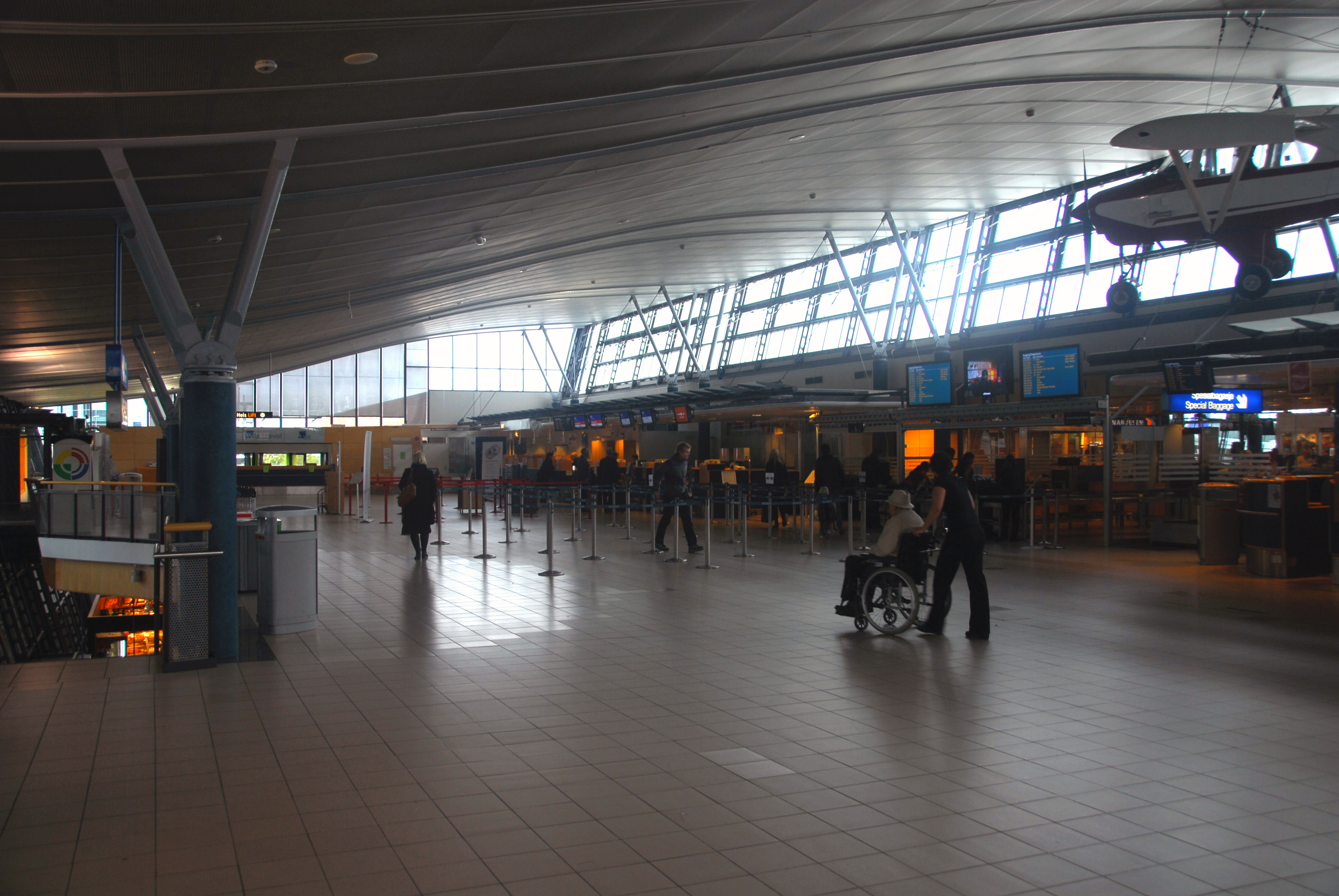
Part of the check-in area at Terminal A

Trondheim Airport is the only primary airport in Trøndelag, and has a catchment area of 310,000 people, including most of Nord-Trøndelag and Sør-Trøndelag. For international flights, the catchment area is slightly larger, and includes part of Nordmøre, Helgeland, and Jämtland in Sweden. In 2009, Trondheim Airport served 3,926,461 passengers, 4,898 tonnes (4,821 long tons; 5,399 short tons) of cargo and 57,912 aircraft movements, down from 2008. The airport ranks fourth in Norway, after Oslo Airport, Gardermoen, Bergen Airport, Flesland and Stavanger Airport, Sola. The busiest route is to Oslo, which was the busiest domestic route and the tenth-busiest route within the European Economic Area in 2008.

Annual passenger traffic
| Year | Passengers | % Change |
|---|---|---|
| 2025 | 4,174,172 | ▲1.5% |
| 2024 | 4,112,556 | ▲2.1% |
| 2023 | 4,028,062 | ▲5.9% |
| 2022 | 3,803,933 | ▲84.5% |
| 2021 | 2,062,299 | ▲14.4% |
| 2020 | 1,802,826 | ▼ -58.9% |
| 2019 | 4,381,921 | ▼ -1.3% |
| 2018 | 4,441,870 | ▲0.3% |
| 2017 | 4,428,897 | ▲0.3% |
| 2016 | 4,417,490 | ▲1.5% |
| 2015 | 4,352,721 | |

Busiest European routes from Værnes (2008)
| Rank | City | Passengers | Airline |
|---|---|---|---|
| 1 | Oslo-Gardermoen, Oslo | 1,618,940 | Norwegian Air Shuttle, Scandinavian Airlines |
| 2 | Bergen-Flesland, Hordaland | 408,897 | Norwegian Air Shuttle, Scandinavian Airlines |
| 3 | Bodø, Nordland | 296,878 | Norwegian Air Shuttle, Scandinavian Airlines, Widerøe |
| 4 | Copenhagen, Denmark | 114,381 | Norwegian Air Shuttle, Scandinavian Airlines |
| 5 | Ålesund-Vigra, Møre og Romsdal | 94,726 | Krohn Air, Scandinavian Airlines, Widerøe |
| 6 | Oslo-Torp, Vestfold | 92,195 | Norwegian Air Shuttle, Widerøe |
| 7 | Amsterdam, Netherlands | 90,836 | KLM, KLM Cityhopper |
| 8 | Brønnøysund-Brønnøy, Nordland | 69,590 | Widerøe |
| 9 | Stavanger-Sola, Rogaland | 65,260 | Scandinavian Airlines |
| 10 | Mosjøen-Kjærstad, Nordland | 47,046 | Widerøe |

== Ground transport ==
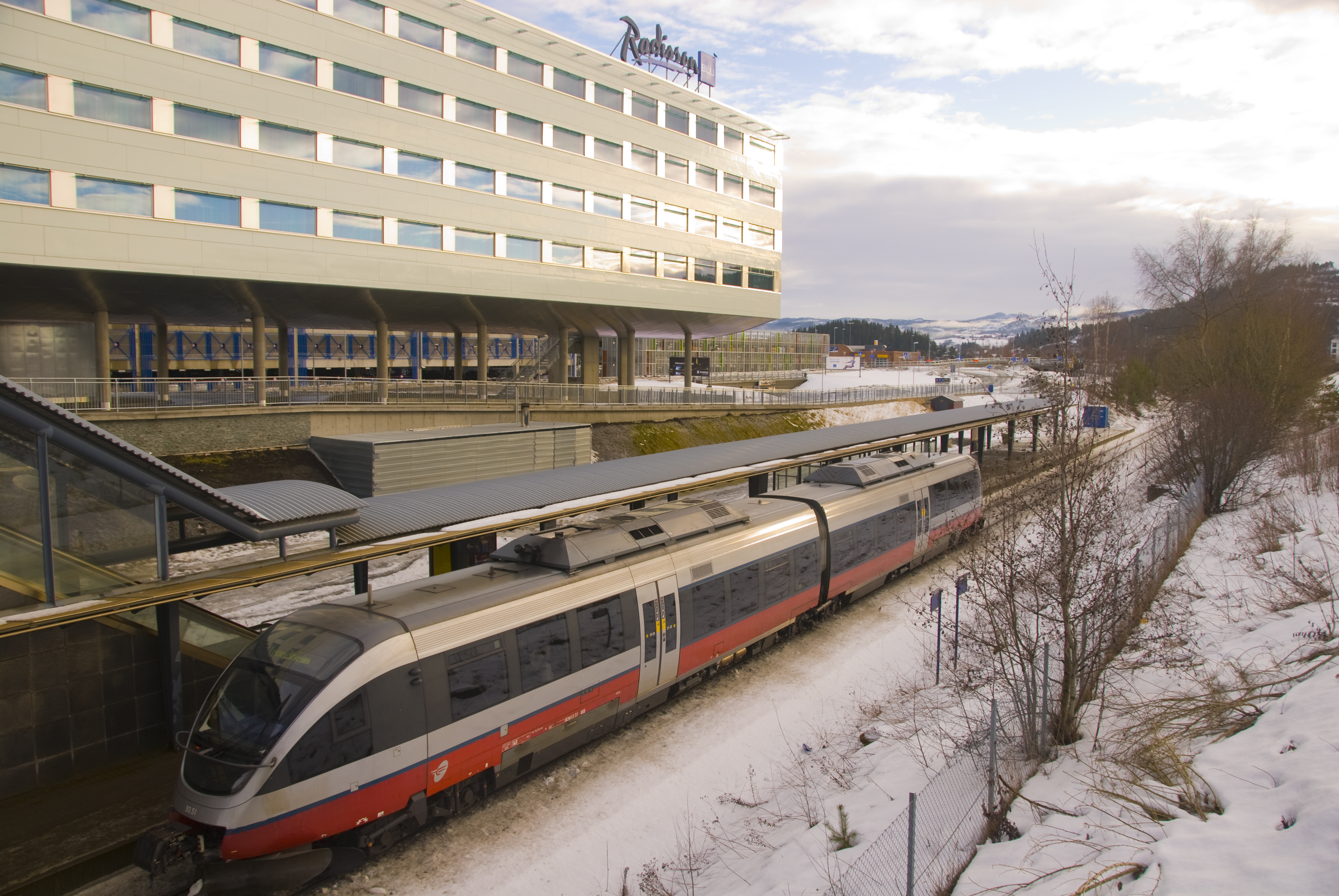
Trondheim Airport Station at the airport terminal is located on the Nordland Line, here with an NSB Class 93 train; in the background is the airport's Radisson Blu hotel.

=== Rail ===
Rail transport is offered from Trondheim Airport Station. The platform is about 190 metres (620 ft) from the check-in at the terminal, and the station is 33.0 kilometres (20.5 mi) from Trondheim Central Station. There is a vending machine for tickets in the airport terminal. Staffed ticket sale is available on board for an extra fee, not at the station.

SJ Norge operates both commuter and express trains to and from Trondheim Airport. In each direction, there are three daily express trains, one to Mo i Rana and two to Bodø. One of the Bodø-trains is a night train. Travel time to Mo i Rana is 6 hours and travel time to Bodø is 9 hours and 5 minutes. The Mo i Rana-service is operated with Class 93 trains, while the Bodø-services are operated with Di 4-hauled trains.

The Trøndelag Commuter Rail offers hourly services in each direction: northbound to Steinkjer and southbound to Trondheim and Lerkendal. During peak hours, the frequency is doubled. Travel time to Trondheim is 38 minutes and to Lerkendal 51 minutes. Northwards, travel time to Levanger is 48 minutes, to Verdal 1-hour and 2 minutes, and to Steinkjer 1-hour and 26 minutes. The commuter rail is operated with Class 92 trains.

Trains from Östersund, Sweden (Meråker Line/Central Line) stop at Hell station, where passengers can change trains or walk 1.5 km (1 mile) to the airport terminal.

=== Road ===
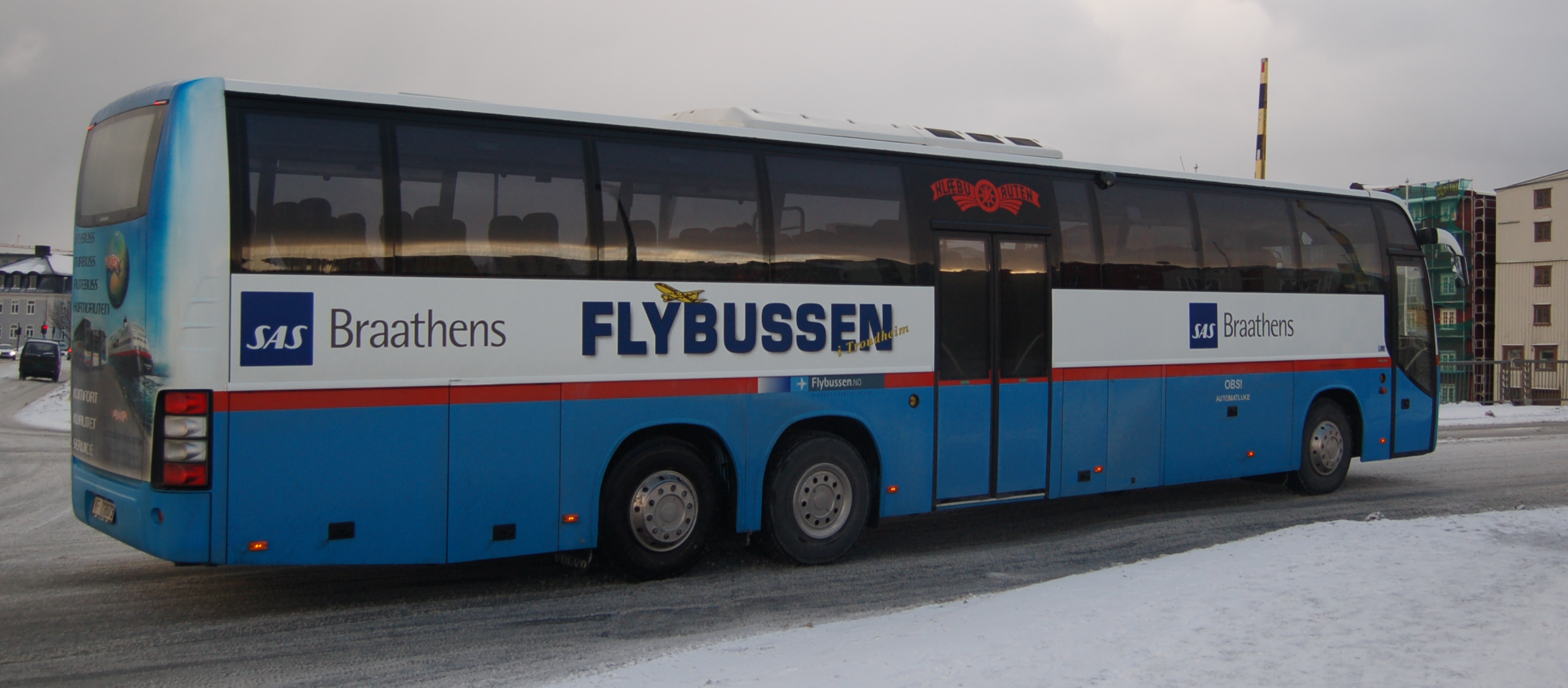
Airport coach in dated livery with the former logos of SAS Braathens (renamed SAS Norge) and Klæburuten (merged into Nettbuss)

The airport is located along European Route E6 and E14. The airports connects to Norwegian National Road 705 via a roundabout, which again connects with the E6 in a grade-separated intersection 300 metres (980 ft) away. The E6 run concurrently northwards in an aircraft bridge under the runway; southwards the E6 run as a two-lane motorway as a toll road past Trondheim. The E14 diverts from the E6 at Stjørdal, 2 km north of the airport. The airport has 3,000 paid parking places, operated by Europark, both indoor and outdoor. Car rental is available, as are taxis.

Nettbuss operates the Flybussen Airport Express Coaches four to six times hourly (every 10 minutes during rush hours) to Downtown Trondheim, stopping at major hotels, Trondheim Central Station and the Munkegata Terminal. Unibuss operates the competing Værnesekspressen. Nettbuss operates city and regional buses to Selbu and Oppdal from the bus stop at Hell Center—five minutes' walk from the airport. TrønderBilene operates NOR-WAY Bussekspress coaches to Namsos. Rica Hell Hotel operates a shuttle bus from the terminal to the hotel, although the hotel is within walking distance (800 m/2500 ft).

== Accidents and incidents ==
- On 21 June 1985, a Boeing 737-200 operating Braathens SAFE Flight 139 from Værnes to Oslo Airport, Fornebu was hijacked by a drunk student who demanded to talk to the prime minister and minister of justice. The plane landed at Fornebu, and the hijacker eventually surrendered his gun in exchange for more beer. No one was injured in the incident.
- On 23 February 1987, a Douglas DC-9 from Scandinavian Airlines landing at Værnes en route from Bodø Airport was written off after a hard landing on the runway. This was caused by a high sink rate caused by the pilot interrupting the landing checklist and forgetting to arm the spoilers. No one was killed in the accident.
