= Krohn Air =

Norwegian virtual airline

IATA	ICAO	Call sign
KR	KRO	—
- Founded: 2010
- Ceased operations: 2014
- Focus cities: Molde Airport, Årø
- Fleet size: 2
- Destinations: 5
- Headquarters: Molde, Norway
- Key people: Claus Krohn (owner)

Krohn Air AS was a virtual, regional airline whose primary route was between Molde Airport, Årø to Trondheim Airport, Værnes in Norway. The airline was established in 2010 after Scandinavian Airlines pulled out of the Molde–Trondheim route. The airline aimed at the business segment, with early morning departures and two daily round trips.

Services were originally flown using a Dornier 328 operated by Sun Air of Scandinavia. Later in that year, Krohn Air acquired a Jetstream 32 and started flights from Molde to Bergen Airport, Flesland and Stavanger Airport, Sola, but these services did not have sufficient patronage and were later terminated. By 2011, the aircraft operation was transferred to Helitrans. In the spring of 2013 the aircraft operation was transferred to AIS Airlines, using two British Aerospace Jetstream 32. The airline started a service from Ålesund Airport, Vigra to Trondheim in March 2013, but pulled out in September. The airline ceased operations on 4 February 2014.

== History ==
From 31 January 2010, Scandinavian Airlines terminated its service from Molde to Trondheim. Krohn Air started operations on 3 February 2010 on the same route, using a Dornier 328 wet leased from Sun Air of Scandinavia. The airline was established and fully owned by Claus Krohn, a local businessman, who was 76 years old at the time. SAS stated in 2011 that they did not regret closing the route, as with the size of aircraft they operated they would need in excess of 20,000 passengers per year on the route, while Krohn Air could survive with fewer because they used smaller aircraft.

On 28 June, the Scandinavian Airlines route from Molde to Bergen was taken over by Widerøe. However, while Scandinavian Airlines previously flew from Molde at 06:45, Widerøe's first flight departed at 08:55. Krohn Air stated that it saw this as a market opportunity to provide a business service from Molde to Bergen. Krohn Air had just bought a Jetstream 32 from Sun-Air, which it planned to use on a new route from Kristiansund Airport, Kvernberget to Trondheim. However, after Widerøe stated that it would start that route in 2011, Krohn Air changed their plans and announced that the aircraft would instead be used on the route from Molde to Bergen. The Bergen service was started on 31 August. On 7 September, the airline announced it would start services from Molde to Stavanger Airport, Sola on 20 September. Because there were few passengers, the services to Bergen and Stavanger were terminated from 19 November 2010.

Krohn Air bought both aircraft from Sun Air, but later decided that they would lease aircraft. Krohn Air paid 21 million Norwegian krone (NOK) for the Dornier and NOK 9.5 million for the Jetstream. The Dornier was sold back to Sun Air, whilst the Jetstream was sold to Helitrans, who took over operation of the route. However, there arose a disagreement between Krohn Air and Sun Air regarding the price of the Dornier, which was settled in court. The settlement resulted in a loss of NOK 13 million for Krohn Air.

In 2010, the airline transported 14,000 people and had a revenue of NOK 17 million, allowing Krohn Air to break even. On 14 February 2011, the company increased the service from Molde to Trondheim from two to four daily services in each direction, from Monday through Thursday. From 2010 to 2012 the airline had an accumulated loss of NOK 3.3 million. This later was reduced back to a typical twice-daily schedule. A twice-daily route from Ålesund to Trondheim was introduced on 3 March 2013. The Ålesund service was terminated on 13 September 2013, with Krohn stating that they were lacking two to three passengers per flight to break even. The company had a revenue of NOK 19 million in 2013. Krohn Air ceased all operations on 4 February 2014, and filed for bankruptcy the following day. Widerøe commenced flights on the Molde–Trondheim route from 1 September 2014.

== Operation ==
Krohn Air was a virtual airline, with a single Jetstream 32 operated by AIS Airlines. The airline provided two daily round trips between Molde Airport, Årø and Trondheim Airport, Værnes. As of 2013 Claus Krohn owned 90 percent of the company, and Roy Uren was co-owner.

== Destinations ==
Destinations
City	IATA	ICAO	Airport	Period
Ålesund	AES	ENAL	Ålesund Airport, Vigra	2013
Bergen	BGO	ENBR	Bergen Airport, Flesland	2010
Molde	MOL	ENML	Molde Airport, Årø	2010–14
Stavanger	SVG	ENZV	Stavanger Airport, Sola	2010
Trondheim	TRD	ENVA	Trondheim Airport, Værnes	2010–14
