= Molde Airport =

Molde Airport Molde lufthavn

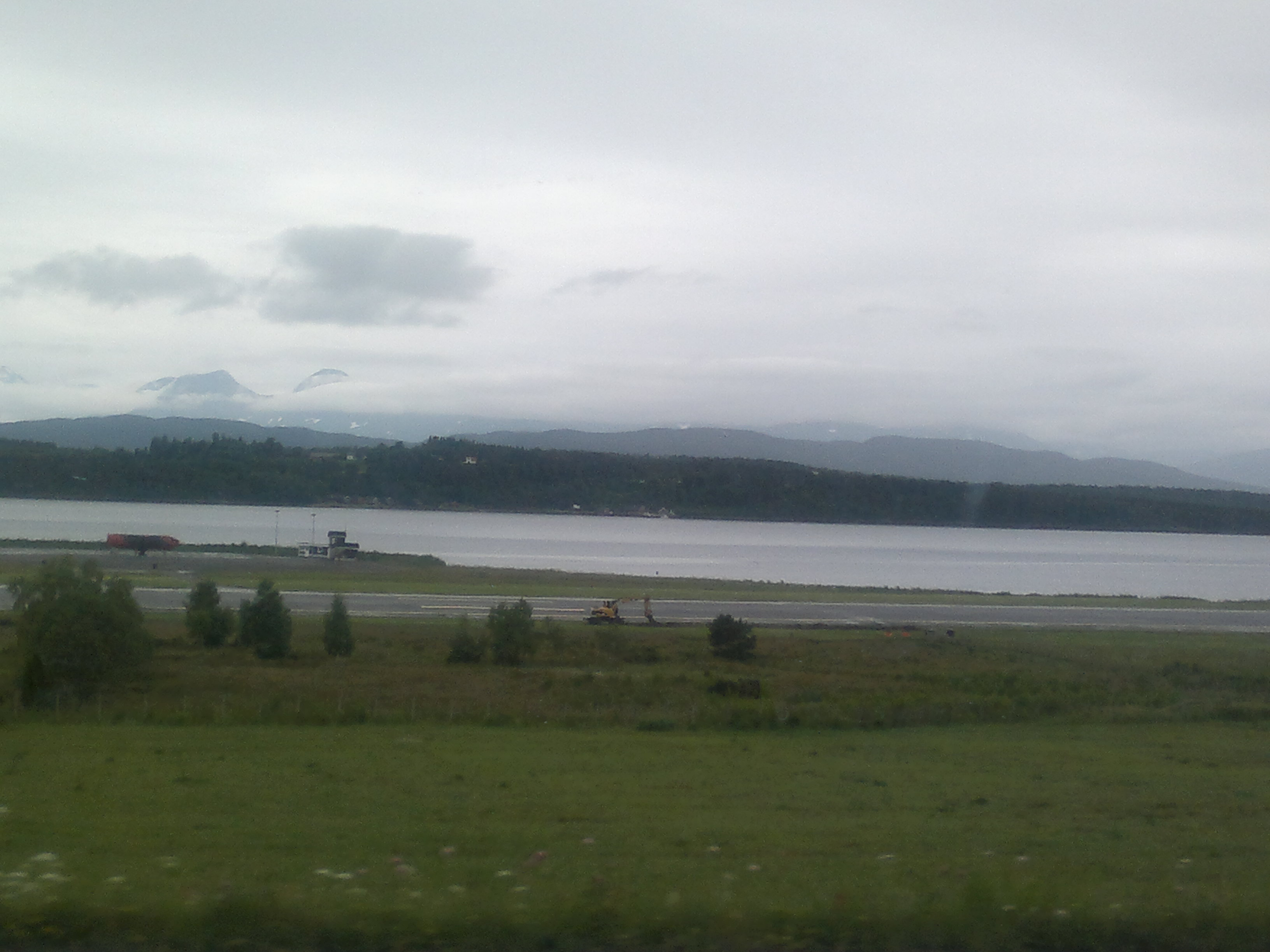
- IATA: MOL; ICAO: ENML

Summary
- Airport type: Public
- Operator: Avinor
- Serves: Molde, Norway
- Location: Årø
- Elevation AMSL: 3 m (9.8 ft)
- Coordinates: 62°44′41″N 007°15′45″E
- Website: avinor.no

Map
- Location within Norway

Runways
Direction	Length		Surface
Direction	m	ft	Surface
07/25	2,220	7,283	Asphalt

Statistics (2014)
- Passengers: 481,406
- Aircraft movements: 9,412
- Cargo (tonnes): 3,517

Molde Airport (Norwegian: Molde lufthavn; IATA: MOL, ICAO: ENML) is an international airport serving the town of Molde in Molde Municipality in Møre og Romsdal county, Norway. It is on the shore of the Moldefjord at Årø, 5 kilometers (3.1 mi) east of town center. The airport's catchment area covers the district of Romsdal.

The airport features a runway measuring 2,220 by 45 meters (7,283 by 148 ft), aligned 07/25. Owned and operated by the state-owned Avinor, the airport served 481,406 passengers in 2014. Scheduled services are provided domestically to Oslo by Scandinavian Airlines and Norwegian Air Shuttle, and to Bergen, Stord and Trondheim by Widerøe.

Proposals for an airport serving Molde were discussed from 1940, but the neighboring towns of Ålesund and Kristiansund were ultimately prioritized. Construction commenced in 1969 and the airport opened on 5 April 1972. Scheduled services were granted to Braathens SAFE, who variously operated Fokker F-27s and Fokker F-28s, later also with larger Boeing 737s. The government took over operation from 1978. New or expansions of the terminals have taken place four times, in 1982, 1993, 2008 and 2012. Inclusive tour (IT) charters have been offered since 2004.

== History ==
=== Planning ===
Proposals for an airport serving Molde were first put forward in 1940. Following the German occupation of Norway, Luftwaffe was interested in building an airfield to cover the county of Møre og Romsdal. They considered two sites—Årø and the island of Gossen in Aukra Municipality. The latter was selected, resulting in the construction of Aukra Airport, Gossen with its 1,600-meter (5,200 ft) wooden runway. Following the end of the war, a civilian commission looked into building a civilian, central airport for the county. It concluded that Gossen was a suitable site as it was flat and situated between the major towns of Ålesund and Molde. Significant investments had been made and the cost of converting the facility to a civilian airport would be low. However, there was some opposition to the plans. There were complaints that the airport was located too far from Kristiansund and Ålesund and that the county would be best served with multiple airports. Parliament approved the airport at Gossen in 1952.

West Norway Airlines established a seaplane route from Bergen via Ålesund, Molde and Kristiansund to Trondheim in 1950. In Molde it operated out of a water airport situated at the port in the town center. The airline proposed in 1954 that four short take-off and landing airports be built along the coast, including one in Molde. They hoped to serve these using Scottish Aviation Twin Pioneers. Årø was the preferred site, although Langmyren was also considered. However, the aircraft were not approved by the authorities, mostly because of an insufficient de-icing system. This resulted in that the plans for Ålesund Airport, Vigra to be prioritized, and soon the site was upgraded to primary airport, allowing it to open on 7 June 1958. West Norway Airlines closed shut down its flights from Molde after the 1956 season.

As a response, Molde Municipality established an airport committee in September 1958 and bought land at Årø, which at the time was located in Bolsøy Municipality. Led by merchant Petter Pettersson, it proposed the construction of a 1,250-meter (4,100 ft) runway, allowing it to handle Braathens SAFE's Fokker F-27 Friendships. At this time Molde Municipality was free to build a municipal airport, granted it followed safety regulations. This required trial landings, but due to limited capacity these were not conducted by the Civil Aviation Administration until October 1961. By then the rules had changed and airports needed a state concession to operate. A government airport commission was approved in 1962, placing all local airport plans on hold. The commission recommended that new safety margins be introduced, forcing a larger plot of land to be acquired. The effected land owners were not interested in selling, forcing the municipality to expropriate the land. The issue was not finalized until the Supreme Court came with a final ruling in favor of the municipality.

The state commission considered several locations which could serve Molde and Kristiansund, either jointly or by building two airports. Discarded sites included Gossen, Ytre Fræna in Fræna Municipality, Henda in Averøy Municipality, Osmarka, and Tingvoll. Only Årø and Kvernberget in Kristiansund were found suitable, with pivoting emphasis laid on their vicinity to their respective town centers. The commission concluded in 1964 that Kristiansund would receive the highest priority, along with Harstad/Narvik Airport, Evenes. Molde was ranked third.

Molde Municipality accepted the priority, but determined in June 1965 that they were free to finance an airport themselves. The municipal administration started working on plans and on 26 April 1966 Braathens SAFE confirmed that the airline was willing to connect Molde to Oslo, Trondheim and Bergen. Årø was aided in 1968 when the Civil Aviation Administration altered the priority of the airports, placing Molde at the top. It cited lower investments, stipulated at 13.2 million Norwegian krone rather than 22.4 million for Kvernberget. The municipality contacted contractor Olav T. Meisingset, who came with a bid for the leveling of the site. The municipality secured a loan from Kommunal Landspensjonskasse and applied the Ministry of Transport and Communications in 1969 for permission to start construction. They stated they were neutral, while the Ministry of Local Government was positive. By then construction of Kristiansund Airport, Kvernberget was already under way, with the airport opening on 30 June 1970. There was a certain amount of controversy regarding the construction of Molde Airport. This would leave a smaller catchment area for the two airports, which could jeopardize good services from the region as a whole.

=== Construction ===
Ground work was contracted to Olav T. Meisingset & Co., with work commencing in early 1969. They used 110,000 man-hours to move 750,000 cubic meters (26,000,000 cu ft) of earthwork. This involved filling in part of Moldefjorden, although the moraine ground eased the work. At the most thirty people were working on the project. When the groundwork was completed, there was interest from private aircraft to land. They were only held off by placing construction equipment strategically along the runway. After the asphalt was laid in 1970, the first such aircraft landed. They continued to use the aerodrome during the winter, without any official permission, yet without the airport authority taking any action to hinder the use. The first official landing was a test flight flown by the CAA on 17 March 1971. Next work commenced on the terminal, operations building and control tower. The main contractor was Arne Moen.

Airport employees started their new jobs on 1 March 1972. The same day Braathens SAFE opened a ticket office at Godtfred Lies plass in downtown Molde. The office also handled local sale of tickets for Widerøe. The official opening of the airport took place on 5 April and was attended by between seven and eight thousand people. The airport initially had fourteen employees. At the time of opening the instrument landing system was not yet installed. A non-directional beacon was installed on Tautra and a visual approach slope indicator at the runway. Later in 1972 two localizers were installed. The airport received a café.

=== Early operational history ===
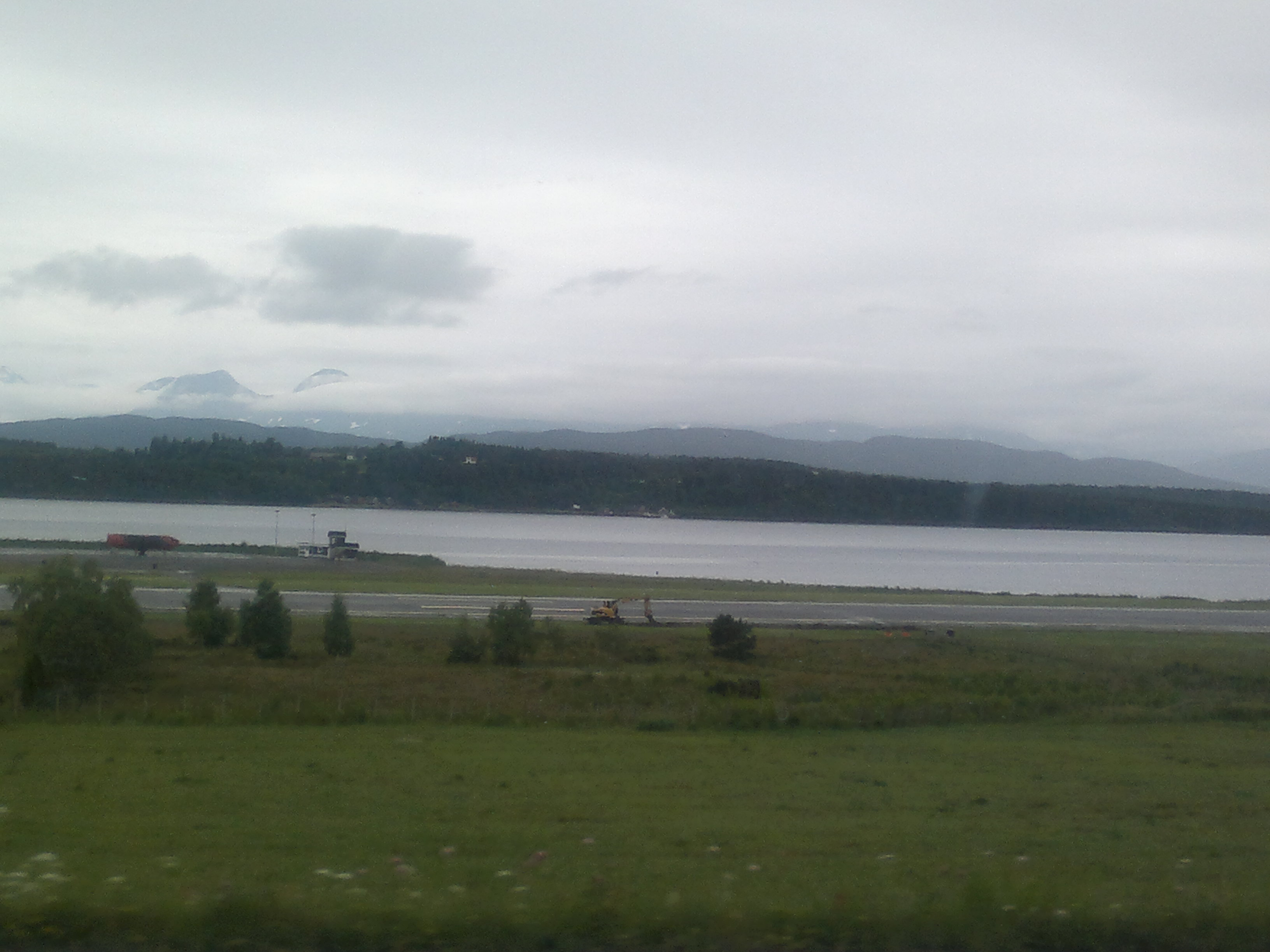

The airport was built to handle one Fokker F-27 Friendship at a time. These aircraft were used by Braathens SAFE on both the coastal routes and the services to the capital. The 1972 summer routes involved three daily services to Oslo Airport, Fornebu, including one with a stop-over in Ålesund. Some of the larger routes instead were flown using the Fokker F-28 Fellowship. There were also three daily services on the coastal route. In cases when Ålesund Airport, Vigra was closed, Braathens would land their larger 124-seat Boeing 737-200s at Årø, making the terminal feel cramped.

Braathens SAFE were awarded the routes to the three primary airports in Møre og Romsdal as part of an arrangement where they split the primary market between themselves and Scandinavian Airlines System. Ålesund had by far the most traffic, about three times that of Molde and Kristiansund. Because they had to operate to three airports in close vicinity, they were unable to operate profitably from any of them. The services were cross-subsidized by the airline being granted monopolies on other routes with higher ridership and profitable operations.

Molde Aero Klubb was established on 6 October 1972. It initially had limited activity and did not have its own aircraft until November 1984. However, many of its members owned their own aircraft. Møre Flyklubb based its Piper Cherokees at Årø. In the first full year of operation—1973—the airport handled 70,227 passengers. Construction of oil platforms was carried out in Åndalsnes during the 1970s, leadingto frequent use of the airport by business jets. To bypass two ferry rides, a seaplane base was built at Årø to allow for connecting flights to the yard.

Increased ridership caused Braathens SAFE to replace all its F-27 turboprops with larger F-28 turbojets out of Molde from 1 June 1976. F-28s had until then only been used on Oslo-bound flights via Ålesund to Oslo, as well as on some coastal services. Travel time on direct Oslo flights was cut by 25 minutes. During the late 1970s Braathens SAFE introduced the Boeing 737 on the Oslo flights. Meanwhile, a court case was raised by thirty-four neighbors who demanded compensation due to noise pollution. Nineteen of these were awarded compensation by the court in 1998.

Ownership and operation of the airport passed from the municipality to the state, through the Civil Aviation Administration, in 1978. This led to more manning of the facility. The airport increased from three to four shifts—increasing its opening hours—and also increased the number of people per shift from three to four. New ground vehicles were also bought. Ridership fell the first years after the opening, and not until 90,063 passengers passed through the airport in 1978 did patronage exceed the 1973 figures. The first major project initiated by the CAA was the construction of a maintenance building. The municipality had let snowplows and other equipment stay parked outdoors, causing them to dilapidate into a state of disrepair. The 720-square-meter (7,800 sq ft) structure opened in 1980. The apron for general aviation was expanded simultaneously.

The CAA's next investment was a new passenger terminal. It included amenities such as a baggage carousel—allowing passengers for the first time to pick up their baggage indoors. With 106,823 passengers in 1982, the airport exceeded the six-digit mark for the first time. A parachute club, Molde Fallskjermklubb, was founded in 1985.

Busy Bee started flights to Molde on 3 March 1980, using a F-27 to fly post to Oslo. Passengers were introduced on these flights from 1985. Braathens SAFE sold their F-28s in 1986. The West Coast route saw only an average 32 passengers to and from Bergen and Stavanger, and 23 to Kristiansund per day. Too small for Boeings, Braathens subcontracted the operations to is regional affiliate, Busy Bee, from March 1986. Patronage to Oslo increased sufficiently that Braathens the same year eliminated all stop-overs in Ålesund. The first proposals for charter flights were launched by Gullivers Reisebyrå in January 1986. They intended to fly a connecting flight to Oslo Airport, Gardermoen and from there onwards to the Mediterranean. Although a contract was signed with Busy Bee, noting came of the plans due to limited interest. Widerøe withdrew from services at Molde in 1987.

An airport coach service was introduced on 4 January 1988. The same year the CAA announced plans to build a new terminal and operations building. Traffic grew rapidly during the 1980s and hit 173,530 passengers that year. Meanwhile, there was a discussion if there was need for both Årø and Kvernberget, and both airports were proposed closed. However, the move was never official from either the CAA nor any political agencies and was confined to speculations in the press. The background for was the 1991 opening of the Kristiansand Fixed Link, which removed the ferry between the two towns.

The airport was partially flooded on 19 January 1989 when Årlelva breached its banks. The riverbed was subsequently moved and areas was freed up to allow for more parking, both on the air and land side. The airport partook in a major military exercise in 1991. The discussion regarding the airport's future was sealed on 6 April 1992 when the CAA announced the construction of a new terminal. Work commenced later that year and Braathens SAFE followed up with the construction of a freight terminal. The CAA invested NOK 54 million, of which 30 million was for the terminal. The airport was closed for a week in September 1993 to re-asphalt the runway and move systems to the new terminal, which opened on 13 September. It was designed to handle 300,000 passengers per year and had three gates. In addition to larger arrival and departure halls, offices were provided for car rental companies. After the official opening took place on 14 October, the old terminal building was demolished to make way for more parking.

=== Deregulation ===
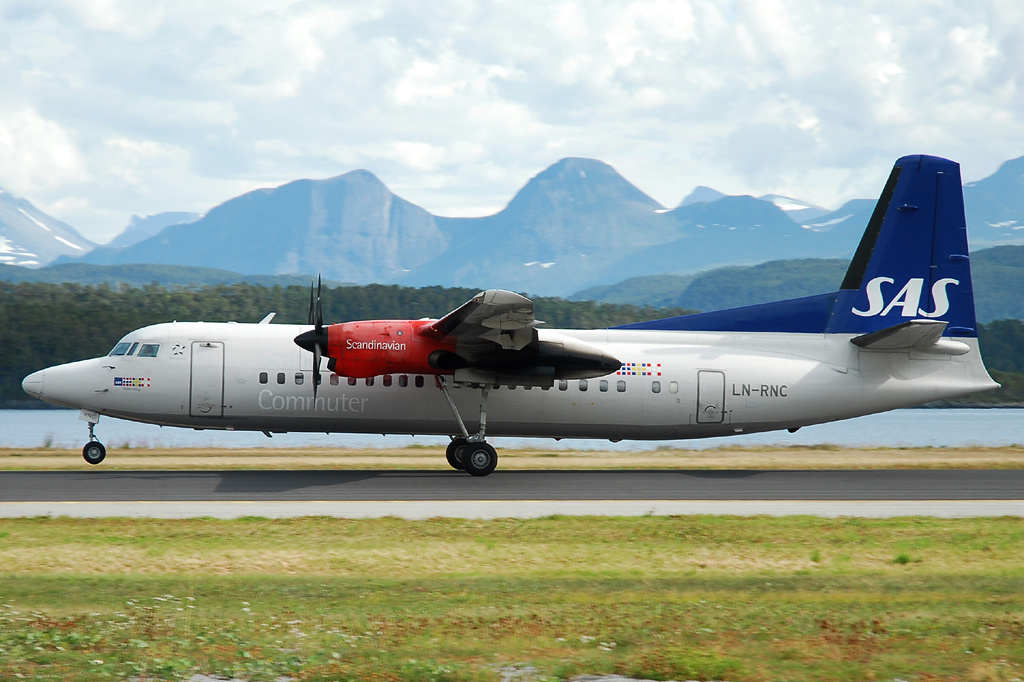
Scandinavian Commuter Fokker 50

Traffic hit 201,864 passengers in 1993. That year Busy Bee folded and their regional routes were taken over by Norwegian Air Shuttle, using the Fokker 50. The airline market was deregulated on 1 April 1994; thereafter any airline was free to fly any route in Norway. SAS chose initially to not take up the competition with Braathens out of Molde, and the only immediate effect was a slight hike in ticket prices. Later that year Braathens increased from three to four daily services to Oslo Airport, Fornebu. An air show was held at the airport on 30 June 1996, but it proved a failure due to overcast weather. The control tower was upgraded in 1997. As an interim solution a temporary tower was erected to serve in its place.

From 1 September 1997 security controls were introduced on a limited number of domestic passengers and all international passengers. This led to the physical separation of the check-in and departure halls. For passengers this had a dramatic effect on travel times. Passengers without check-in baggage had previously been able to meet at the airport five to ten minutes before boarding time and reach their aircraft. Security controls became a bottle-neck, with peaks just before departures and otherwise minimal traffic. Long queues were commonplace.

Molde FK had a good spell in European football before and after the turn of the millennium. Chartered aircraft with players and supporters attending games at Molde stadion normally constituted the bulk of international passengers at the airport in these years. The Danish carriers Muk Air and Scan Con Airways flew charter services from Molde to Aalborg Airport and Thisted Airport, respectively during the summer of 2000. Muk operated a Shorts 360 while Scan Con operated an Embraer 110 Bandeirante. The airport served 311,988 passengers that year, but fell the following years as part of the general slump in the aviation market.

Braathens was bought by SAS and became part of the SAS Group on 1 September 2002. That day SAS Ground Services took over ground handling at the airport. SAS Commuter look over Norwegian Air Shuttle's regional routes on 31 March 2003. Norwegian instead relaunched itself as a low-cost carrier. It opened a route from Molde to Oslo using a Boeing 737-300 from 19 June. It flew once a day during the afternoon. Although featuring low prices, its inconvenient time slot left it with few passengers, especially business travelers. Norwegian pulled out of the route in January 2004. The first inclusive tour (IT) charter was started by Apollo on 14 June to Crete. It was flown weekly by a Boeing 737-700 operated by Braathens. Combined the football and IT charters drew 3,037 international passengers to the airport in 2003.

Molde's first airline was Classic Norway Air, established with a Jetstream 31 in 2004. Its business idea was to fly tourists staying at their resorts in Romsdal. Braathens merged with Scandinavian Airlines in Norway to create SAS Braathens that year. They introduced Molde's first international route, to Barcelona, six Sundays starting 20 June. Work on the gas terminal at Nyhamna in Gossen started in May 2004. With many construction workers from other parts of the country and abroad, it brought an increase to traffic at the airport. Most of this flying was subcontracted to Atlantic Airways. They flew up to two daily charter flights to Gdańsk as well as weekly services to Inverness, Newcastle, Billund, Bergen, Stord, and Stavanger.

IT charter services to Las Palmas commenced on 28 October 2005. Work on a new operations building started in December, costing 60 million kroner. Coast Air introduced services from Molde to Haugesund, Bergen and Trondheim in 2006 and West Air Sweden won the contract to fly the post. SAS Braathens had by then increased to five daily flights to Oslo and reached a load factor of ninety percent.

Work on the extension of the runway started on 31 January 2007, involving the moving of 700,000 cubic meters (25,000,000 cu ft) of earthwork. The runway was extended westwards, causing a new ILS system to be installed in that direction. Costing 57 million kroner, the work saw the strip extended by 379 meters (1,243 ft) to 2,120 meters (6,960 ft). The extension opened on 1 July 2008. Although this allowed for longer take-off runs, the landing distances were unaffected. This allows the airport to serve as large aircraft as the Boeing 757-200 on a trans-Atlantic route.

Vildanden introduced a daily service to Skien Airport, Geiteryggen on 26 February 2007. They never reached their target ridership and terminated the route in November. With the completion of Nyhamna in the summer, ridership at the airport began to fall, dropping by 110,000 in 2008. Ving and Star Tour introduced winter IT charters to Las Palmas from October. This spurred the need for a larger terminal, with construction starting in March 2008. When completed, it could handle a full 180-seat Boeing 737-800 at both the domestic and international sections simultaneously. It also featured a duty-free shop.

Centralwings started a scheduled service to Gdańsk Lech Wałęsa Airport and Warsaw Airport on 18 February 2009. Unstable use caused it to be terminated in April. Norwegian resumed flights from Oslo to Molde on 20 August, this time using their 737-800s twice daily. SAS responded by reducing their services from five to three daily flights. Norwegian thereafter, from 1 September, introduced a third daily service. Between them ridership increased by twenty percent. Røros Flyservice was established at the airport to provide ground handling for Norwegian.

SAS terminated its Trondheim service from 1 February 2010. Within days Krohn Air was established to operate the route, using a wet leased 32-passenger Dornier 328. SAS Commuter terminated its West Coast operations in June 2010 and transferred these to Widerøe, who introduced 50- and 74-seat Bombardier Dash 8-300s and -400, respectively. Korhn Air introduced flights to Bergen from 31 August. It followed up in September with flights to Stavanger Airport, Sola. Both the Stavanger and Bergen flights were unprofitable and terminated on 19 November 2010.

A further terminal extension was completed in 2012, consisting of 570 square meters (6,100 sq ft), mostly as a new second story. Of this, 200 square meters (2,200 sq ft) features a duty-free store. Krohn Air ceased all operations on 4 February 2014, and filed for bankruptcy the following day. Widerøe commenced flights on the Molde–Trondheim route from 1 September 2014. Wizz Air introduced two weekly flights from Gdańsk Airport to Molde starting 30 March 2015.

== Facilities ==
Molde Airport is situated along Moldefjorden at Årø, 5 kilometers (3 mi) from the town center. Owned and operated by the state-owned Avinor, it is the sole airport with scheduled services in Romsdal. It features an asphalt runway with physical dimensions 2,220 by 45 meters (7,283 by 148 ft) aligned 07/25. It has a takeoff run available (TORA) of 2,120 and 2,080 meters (6,960 and 6,820 ft) on runways 07 and 25, respectively, and a landing distance available (LDA) of 1,980 meters (6,500 ft). It is equipped with a category I instrument landing system in both directions. The airport is equipped with category 7 fire and rescue service. There is no parallel taxiway. The airport resides at a reference elevation of 3 meters (10 ft) above mean sea level.

About 200 people work at the airport. It has opening hours from 05:30 to 23:00. There is parking for 600 cars. The airport is situated immediately off European Road E39. There is apron parking for six jetliners, as well as a general aviation area.

The departures area has dining area and a duty-free store. The operations building measures 2,600 square meters (28,000 sq ft) and consists of offices, the fire station, garages and workshops. Aviation fuel is provided by Shell. Jetpak SAS Cargo owns a freight terminal, situated between the passenger terminal and the operations building. The control tower is located on an artificial peninsula on the south side of the runway. It provides aerodrome flight information service. The air space around the airport is controlled by Vigra Approach.

== Airlines and destinations ==
The busiest route out of Molde are services to Oslo, which are flown by Norwegian Air Shuttle, with three daily round trips using Boeing 737s. Regional carrier Widerøe flies multiple daily trips to Trondheim and Bergen, using Bombardier Dash 8s. Årø served 481,406 passengers, 9,412 aircraft movements and handled 3,517 tonnes of cargo in 2014. Molde is the airport which handles the fourth-most domestic post in the country. Operation of the airport ran at a deficit of NOK 40 million in 2012.

Airlines	Destinations
airBaltic	Seasonal: Gran Canaria
Norwegian Air Shuttle	Oslo
Sunclass Airlines	Seasonal charter: Rhodes
Widerøe	Bergen

== Statistics ==
Annual passenger traffic
Year	Passengers	% Change
2025	335,737	▼ -3.3%
2024	347,260	▼ -12.4%
2023	396,394	▲12.6%
2022	352,051	▲83.3%
2021	192,078	▲4.3%
2020	184,210	▼ -57.3%
2019	431,668	▼ -0.7%
2018	434,515	▼ -9.2%
2017	478,475	▼ -5.8%
2016	507,991	▼ -1.7%
2015	517,031	

== Bibliography ==
- Hovde, Wiggo (2012). Molde lufthavn, Årø, 40 år (in Norwegian). Molde: Fotouniverset. ISBN 978-82-998818-8-3.
