= EuroPark =

Scandinavian parking operator

EuroPark AS
- Company type: Subsidiary
- Industry: Parking
- Headquarters: Oslo, Norway
- Area served: Scandinavia
- Revenue: 895 million kr
- Operating income: NOK 65 million
- Number of employees: 880
- Parent: ATPARK
- Website: www.europark.no

EuroPark AS is the Scandinavian division of ATPARK with operations in Norway, Sweden and Denmark. It is the largest parking operator in Norway and Denmark. Head offices are located in Oslo, Norway.

== History ==
The company was founded in Norway as A/S Lufthavnparkering in 1979, after it won a contract with the Civil Aviation Authority to operate the airport parking facilities at Bergen Airport, Flesland. The company expanded to other airports in the country, including Oslo Airport, Fornebu in 1983. In 1991, the company changed its name to EuroPark AS. It expanded to Sweden in 1992 and to Denmark in 1995. The company was sold to ATPARK of Germany in 1999 and renamed EuroPark Scandinavia AS as a holding company for the operating companies in the three Scandinavian countries. In 2006, the company bought InterPark and Legal Parkering.

== Operations ==
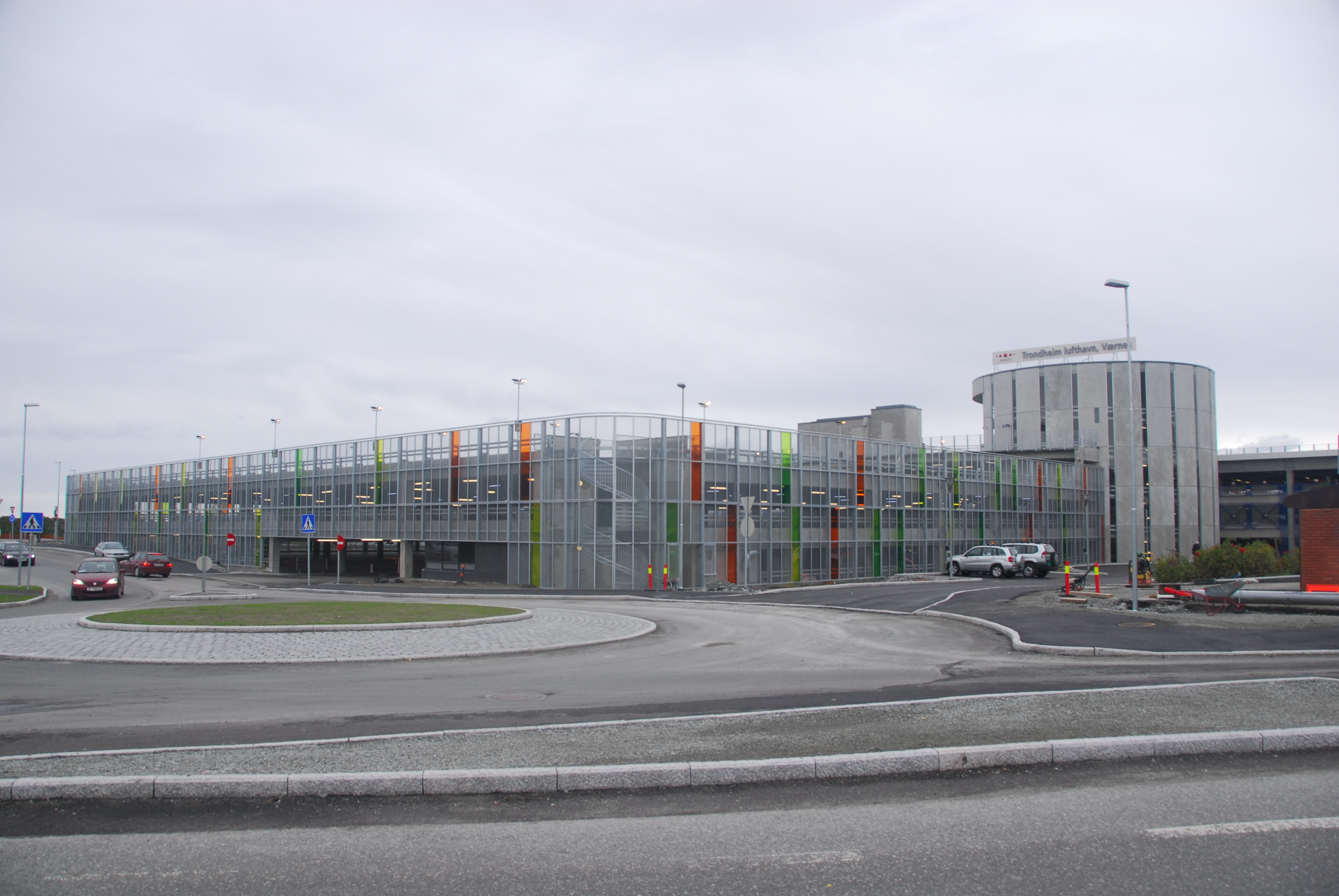
EuroPark operates the parking facilities at Trondheim Airport, Værnes

In Norway, the company is the largest parking company and offers parking in 41 cities and towns. EuroPark operates the parking at Oslo Airport, Gardermoen, Bergen Airport, Flesland, Stavanger Airport, Sola, Trondheim Airport, Værnes, Bodø Airport, Tromsø Airport, Sandefjord Airport, Torp, Haugesund Airport, Karmøy and Alta Airport. In 2006, the company had 100,000 parking spaces in 1,100 facilities with 26 million annual customers. It had 450 employees and a revenue of 835 million kr and a profit of NOK 53 million.

In Sweden, the company has 1,200,000 parking places at 4,100 facilities in more than ten cities. The company has 200 employees.

In Denmark, the company is the largest parking company and offers parking in 80 cities. It has 230 employees and a revenue of DKK 200 million. This includes parking at Copenhagen Airport and Billund Airport.

== Criticisms ==
EuroPark has frequently been criticized for heavy-handed and unreasonable parking enforcement. For example, they have issued tickets to paying customers who parked with one tire on the white line demarcating the parking spot, and one guard physically assaulted a business owner who demanded an explanation for how EuroPark was treating his customers.

Other complaints include falsely accusing customers of using multiple parking tickets to avoid time limits on parking, writing tickets for parking two minutes beyond the permitted time and even ticketing owners for parking in a space where the customer had a valid, paid contract with EuroPark for the space.

In several instances, EuroPark's enforcement has been described as so aggressive that customers avoid businesses where EuroPark is in charge of parking. This has led business owners and municipalities to threaten EuroPark with non-renewal of their contracts.

EuroPark has also been criticized for unreasonable policies, such as refusing to waive a parking ticket where a customer had paid for parking but failed to display the receipt in the windshield. EuroPark's own website cites "parking ticket fell on the floor" as an example of a situation where a ticket will not be waived - even if proof of paid parking is subsequently submitted to the company.

If a customer is unable to pay for parking because EuroPark's equipment is malfunctioning, EuroPark's policy requires the customer to notify them of the problem at their own expense. They provide a phone number to call for equipment malfunctions, but the numbers are not toll-free. (Citation shows example).
