= Henda =

Henda is a feminine given name. It has several unrelated origins. As a name of Yiddish origin (Hebrew: הֶענדָא) it means "gracious" or "merciful" in Hebrew. It can also be a shortened form of the Dutch name Hendrika, cognate to the Germanic name Henry. Notable people named Henda include:

- Henda Ayari (born 1976), French writer, feminist and secular activist
- Henda Ducados (born 1964), French-Angolan economist and sociologist
- Henda Swart (born 1939), South African mathematician
- Henda Zaouali (born 1960), retired Tunisian fencer
