= History of Widerøe =

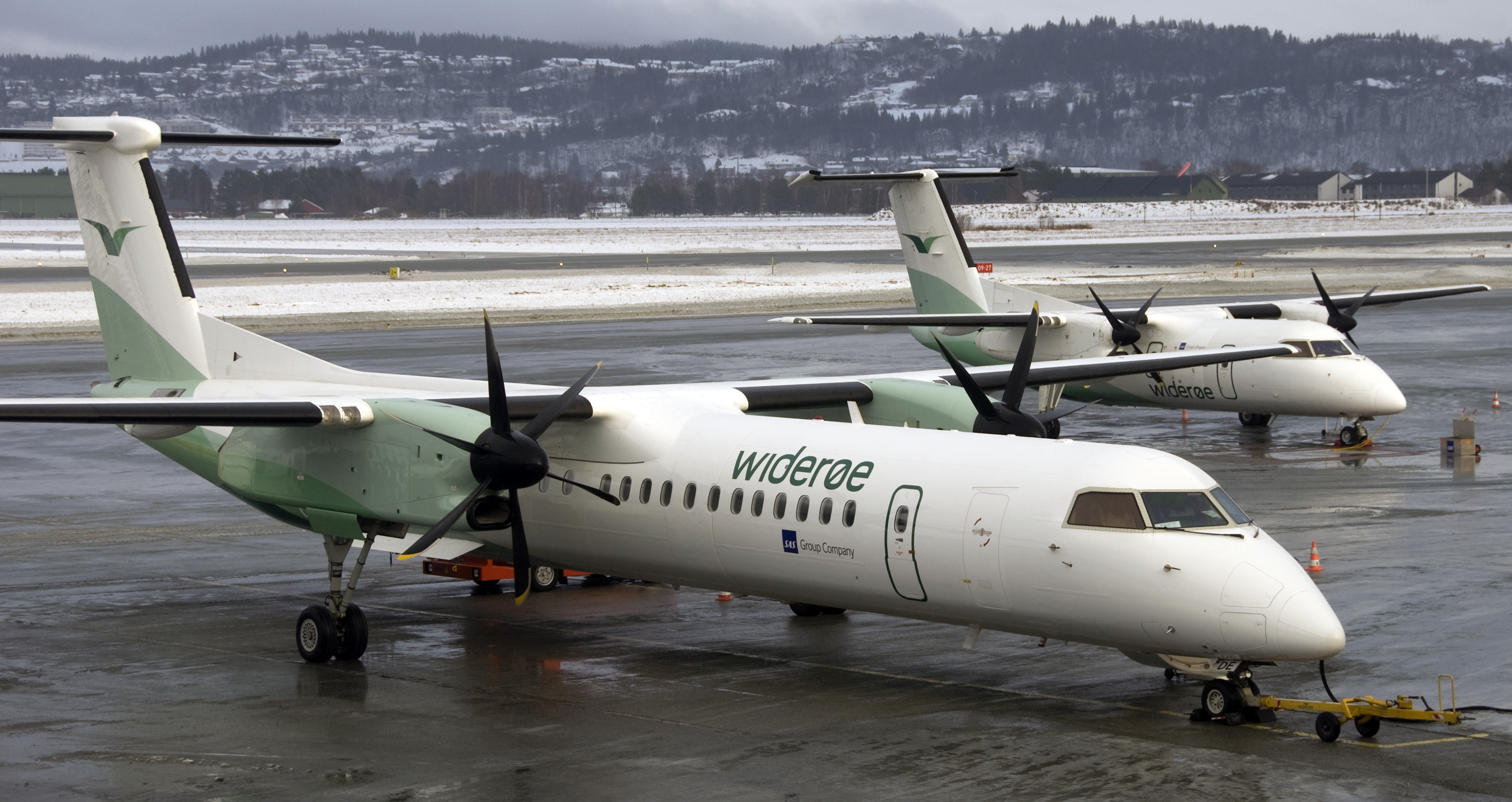
Dash 8 Q400 and -100 at Trondheim Airport, Værnes in 2010

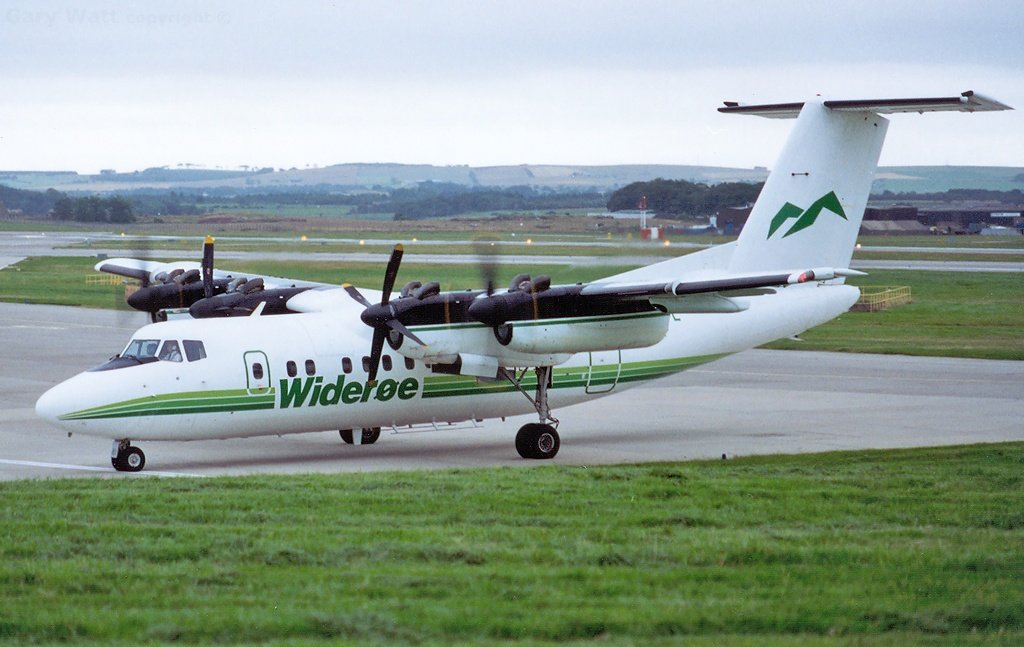
A de Havilland Canada Dash 7 at Aberdeen Airport in 1993

Widerøe's Flyveselskap ASA, is a regional airline based in Bodø Norway, established by Viggo Widerøe, Einar Isdahl and Arild Widerøe on 19 February 1934. The airline started off with a combination of scheduled, aerial photography and general aviation services using seaplanes. It lost its route concessions to Norwegian Air Lines in 1935 and was subsequently bought by that company, for whom it operated several minor routes. World War II hindered Widerøe from operating any flights between 1939 and 1945. After the war Widerøe started flying various seaplane routes that were too small for DNL and its successor, Scandinavian Airlines System (SAS). These routes were commonly flown using Noorduyn Norseman and de Havilland Canada Otter aircraft. During the 1960s Widerøe attempted operating Douglas DC-3s for charter flights, but soon closed those operations.

A national network of regional airports started being constructed in the late 1960s and Widerøe was awarded the right to operate the subsidized routes. From 1968 the airline introduced the Twin Otter, which it eventually operated a dozen of. From 1981 de Havilland Canada Dash 7s were introduced on the main routes. Widerøe experienced four fatal accidents between 1982 and 1993. Norsk Air was bought in 1989, after Fred. Olsen & Co. became a majority owner, and between 1993 and 2000 Widerøe replaced its entire fleet with the de Havilland Canada Dash 8. With the deregulation of the airline market in 1994, Widerøe started several international routes and from 1997 the regional network became subject to public service obligations (PSO). The SAS Group bought the airline between 1997 and 2002. Widerøe then gradually took over all the group's regional operations in Norway.

== Establishment ==
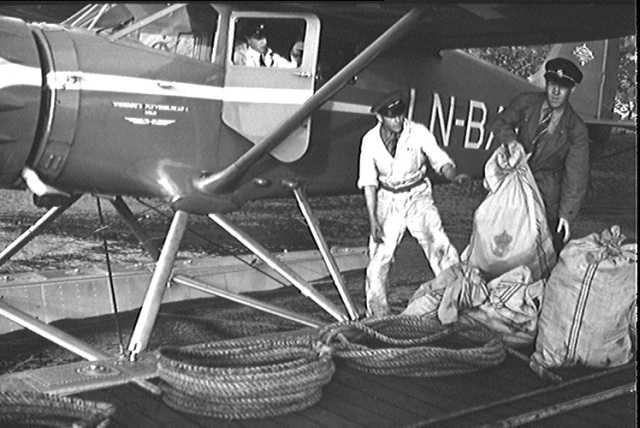
Loading post onto a Stinson Reliant LN-BAR in Oslo in 1936

Widerøe was established as a merger between two small airlines established during the 1930s. Lotsberg & Skappel, owned by Helge Skappel, Leiv Brun, Ditlef Smith and Erik Engnæs, operated a Gipsy Moth. Widerøe & Bjørneby, which was founded by Viggo Widerøe and Halvor Bjørneby, operated a Simmonds Spartan. The two started a cooperation between themselves and Norsk Aero Klubb to establish air shows in Eastern Norway. During the winter the aircraft were stationed at mountain resorts and generated revenue by flying skiers into the wilderness. Advertisement flights were introduced, where a company or product name was painted on the hull, with a neon-light version underneath, and leaflets dropped from the aircraft.

Viggo Widerøe traveled to the United States with NOK 25,000 in 1933 and flew back with a Waco Cabin. The same year the company bought five used de Havilland DH.60 Moths from the Norwegian Army Air Service and started aviation schools in Oslo and Bergen. Widerøe's Flyveselskap A/S was founded by Viggo Widerøe, Einar Isdahl and Arild Widerøe on 19 February 1934. Skis were equipped on the Cabins and Spartan during winter. The company also started ambulance flights. In April the company expanded their share capital from NOK 25,000 to NOK 65,000. The money was used to buy a seaplane variant Cabin and on 15 June it started flying the post route from Oslo via Kristiansand and Stavanger to Haugesund. During the summer the company arranged a summer camp for youth and bought a sail plane.

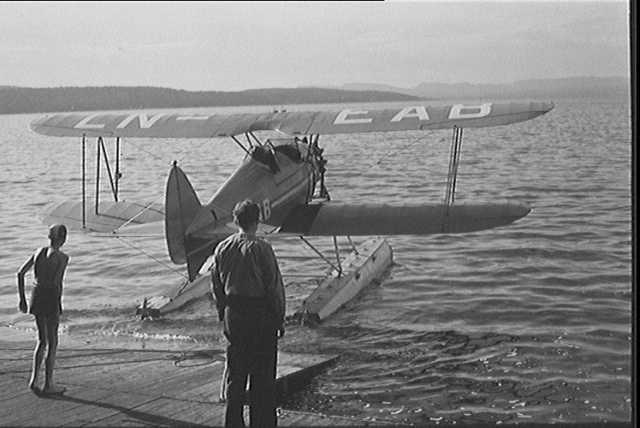
The Waco RNF LN-EAB at Ingierstand in 1937

The company started a cooperation with four regional steam ship companies—Vesteraalens, Nordenfjeldske, Stavangerske and Arendalske. They established the company Norske Kystflyveruter On 21 November 1934 and applied for all concessions to fly postal services around the coast, as well as to Gothenburg in Sweden. At the same time, Fred. Olsen & Co. and Bergenske bought [Norwegian Air Lines (DNL) and applied for the same routes. Widerøe intended to use seaplanes, while DNL chose land planes. The government urged to companies to split the routes between them, but before the negotiations were completed, Nygaardsvold's Cabinet was appointed and granted DNL a ten-year concession for all domestic flights.

After losing all scheduled flights, Widerøe expanded to Northern Norway and started taxi flights. The company expanded into the cartography business in 135. In Oslo the company built a summer base for sea planes at Ingierstand in Oppegård Municipality, and a winter base for ski planes at Bogstadvannet. Around Bergen the airline landed at cruise ships and offer flights to tourists to see the fjords and mountains. In March 1936, 51 percent of the company was taken over by DNL as part of a private placement. This allowed DNL to transfer some of its concessions to Widerøe, who started flying Oslo–Lillehammer/Tretten–Gålå–Fefor–Tyinholmen/Nystuen, mainly aimed at tourists. A Bellanca Senior Pacemaker was bought for the route. Widerøe also wet operated DNL's route from Oslo to Gothenburg, the Tromsø–Honningsvåg route and Bergen–Vadheim–Slidre–Balestrand. These routes were partially flown using the Stinson Reliant.

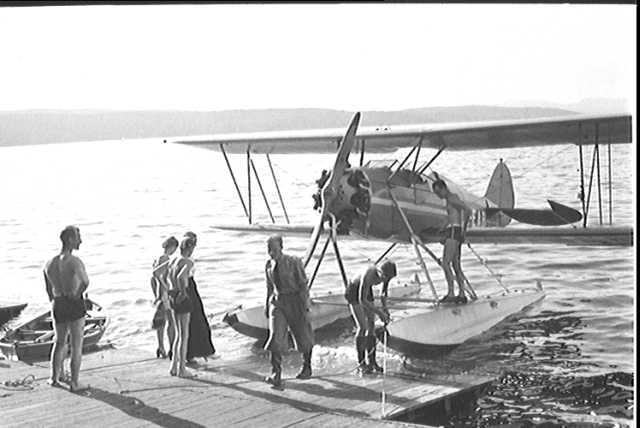
The Waco RNF LN-EAB at Ingierstand in 1937

Widerøe carried out a cartography expedition to Antarctica in 1937, financed by Lars Christensen. The airline carried out 44 flights along a 4,000 kilometers (2,500 mi) section of coast, covering at least 50 kilometers (31 mi) inland. The airline operated a route from Trondheim and Bodø between July and September. The base at Bogstad in Bergen was expanded, and the company was granted a monopoly on all aerial photography flights for the Mapping Authority. The Bogstad workshop and Birger Hønningstad started a cooperation in 1938 where Widerøe built the Hønningstad Norge planes. The same year, a plane went to Svalbard for cartographic work, and a route was started from Trondheim via Brønnøysund, Sandnessjøen, Bodø, Narvik and Harstad to Tromsø. For three months, the route was expanded to Kirkenes via Hammerfest and Vadsø.

Following the break-out of World War II on 2 September 1939, all pilots became conscripted and a ban on civilian aviation was enforced. DNL was worried about their steady financial losses and suggested liquidating Widerøe. DNL's shares were therefore transferred to the other shareholders on 5 December 1939. The following year Widerøe started flying ambulance flights for the military. The planes were leased from the airline while the crew were conscripted. Widerøe was also granted dispensation from the civil aviation ban to continue its school at Bogstad. Following the German invasion of Norway, many of Widerøe's pilots and aircraft were flown to Mjøsa where they served as part of the defence. All aircraft were grounded during the occupation and German authorities demanded that magnets and propellers be handed in. The workshop at Bogstad was kept busy with production of ambulance sleds for the Wehrmacht. In secret the company also started building a Hønningstad C5 Polar ambulance plane at Bogstad. The German authorities sealed the company's archives so only people with German permission had access to aerial photos.

== Mixed operations ==
The ban on civil aviation continued after the liberation of Norway in 1945 and the employees at Bogstad were hired by the Royal Norwegian Air Force at Oslo Airport, Fornebu. Widerøe's Piper Cubs were restored and the company bought a SAI KZ III and a Fairchild Cornell for scheduled services. A Hønninstad Norge B was completed and two Messerschmitt Taifuns for aerial photography were taken over from Luftwaffe. Widerøe bought three Fairchild Argus for aerial photography and received permission to fly from 2 February 1946. The same year the company's mechanical division was moved from Bogstad to Fornebu. A Republic Seabee was bought in 1947, but further purchases were not permitted by the authorities to keep down the outflow of currency. Forenede Industrier bought the majority of the company in 1947 and Viggo Widerøe was appointed managing director. The Hønninstad C.5 Polar was completed, but serial production for the Air Force did not commence as they instead opted for foreign-build aircraft financed through foreign aid from Canada.

The company was awarded concession for a route from Arendal to Oslo from 1948. Widerøe merged with Narvik-based Polarfly and changed its name to Widerøe's Flyveselskap og Polarfly A/S. The take-over included four Noorduyn Norseman craft. This made it possible for the new company to station two planes at Skattøra in Tromsø. The following year the airline started selling aerial images of farms to farm-owners. In 1950 Widerøe took over Stavanger–Haugesund–Bergen on behalf of DNL, and participated in an Antarctic expedition from November 1950 to February 1951. The same winter the company started flight training for the air force using Cornells. The company also won a contract to maintain all the aircraft of that type for the air force.

The Avro Anson V aerial photography aircraft was in 1951 replaced with four Airspeed Oxford from the Royal Norwegian Air Force. Starting 21 May, the airline commenced its first scheduled service in Northern Norway, from Narvik via Svolvær to Bodø. The following year the company established itself at Trondheim Airport, Lade with a Seabee taxi- and ambulance plane as well as school activity. The Northern Norway-route was expanded to also serve Gravdal. A de Havilland Canada DHC-2 Beaver was bought in 1953 for use in Finnmark. In an effort to diversify its portfolio, Widerøe started manufacturing emergency rafts, refrigerated garages in aluminum and industrial thermo elements. The company signed a subcontract in 1954 with SAS, the successor of DNL, to operate a seaplane route from Tromsø via Alta, Hammerfest and Kirkenes to Vadsø, resulting in the airline purchasing its first de Havilland Canada DHC-3 Otter. That year the airline had 21 mechanics in Oslo and 14 in Tromsø and signed a contract to service the Air Force' Norseman aircraft.

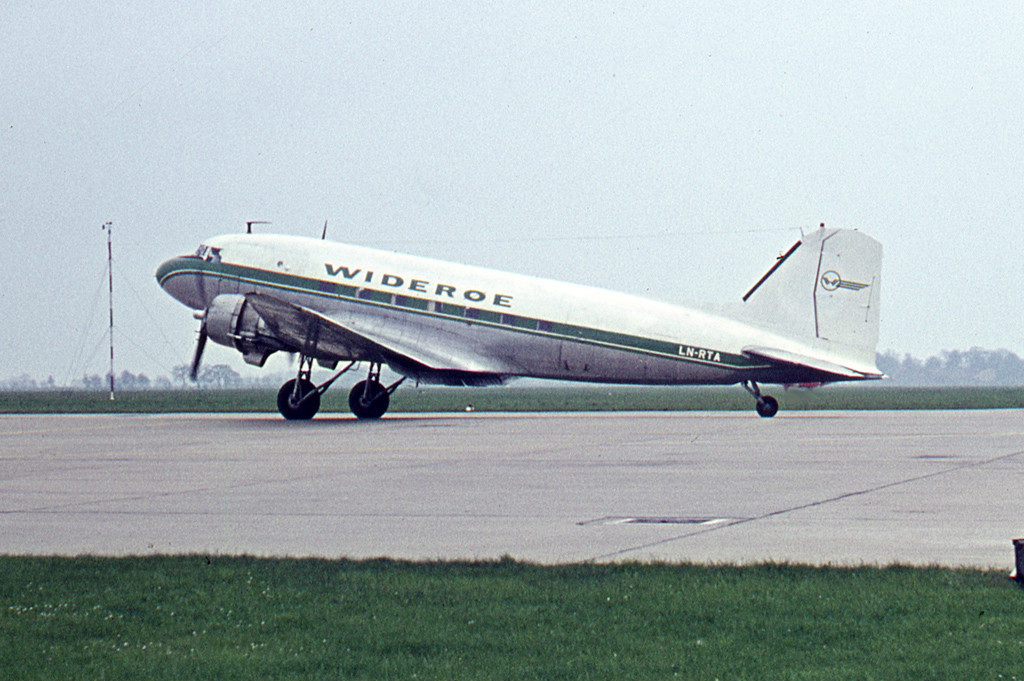
A Douglas DC-3 at Hannover Airport in 1964

The company took into use two Lockheed 12As for aerial photography in 1956, one of which was used for work in Liberia and Syria. Widerøe also took over SAS' last Junkers Ju 52 and put it into service on the sea route Bodø–Harstad–Tromsø. Thus Widerøe operated all of SAS' former sea routes. After being issued a loan from SAS the following year, Widerøe was able increase its fleet of Otters for four and could retire the Ju 52. The company changed its name back to Widerøe's Flyveselskap A/S on 1 July 1958 and took over SAS' aviation school at Fornebu. That year both a Cessna 170 and a Cornell crashed, between them killing five people. The company bought a Douglas RB-26C Invader, which they used for aerial photography in Svalbard. The air force retired its last nine Norsemen in 1959, and Widerøe cooperated with Solbergfly to purchase these, paying NOK 125,000 for five aircraft. This proved too ambitious, so they sold two to Aero Sahara. SAS decided to reduce its routes in Finnmark in 1960, resulting in Widerøe retiring their Norsemen, leaving the airline exclusively with Otters for scheduled services.

The mechanical division was awarded the contract to build a base for the military on Jan Mayen in 1959. It was prefabricated at Fosser and completed in 1960. This division was spun off as Widerøe Industri in 1964. Helikopter Service used Widerøe for technical services until 1963, when it established its own division. Widerøe bought a Douglas DC-3 for charter traffic in 1962. The aircraft was prone with technical faults and was replaced by another DC-3 bought from Braathens SAFE in September. A Nord 260 Super Broussard, also used for charter traffic, was bought in December. By 1965 the airline had operated four different DC-3s and bought three Nords. Three primary airports opened in Finnmark in 1963, resulting in SAS terminating all of Widerøe's seaplane routes north of Tromsø. The Trondheim base was closed 31 December 1963, following the decision to redevelop the area for industry and only use the airport at Værnes.

Widerøe's management wanted to have larger aircraft for charter, resulting in a cooperation with Nordair of Denmark. A Douglas DC-6 was leased from Nordair and started flights out of Oslo with a Widerøe Nordair livery in 1964. It quickly proved unprofitable and was terminated. The same year a DC-3 parked at Fornebu burnt up, but none of the passengers were killed. All charter operations were terminated in 1965, after the company had failed to find financing for larger aircraft. During the early 1960s, the company bought new photography planes from Cessna: a 320 and a 185. The Bodø–Narvik route was terminated in 1964, but the following year seaplane routes were introduced from Bodø to the island municipalities of Røst and Værøy. During the early 1960s Widerøe had air ambulances stationed at Bodø, Narvik and Tromsø, and from 1964 at Alta and Hammerfest. New concessions for seaplane routes were issued in 1966 and Widerøe commenced flights on the routes Tromsø–Hammerfest and Bodø–Mo i Rana–Sandnessjøen–Brønnøysund–Rørvik–Namsos–Hell. Additional Otters were bought from the Royal Norwegian Air Force for these routes. New concessions for sea planes were granted in 1966, with the routes This made it possible to sell all the Norsemen. New Cessna 411A, 206 and 337 aircraft were bought in 1968 to replace the older photography aircraft.

== From sea to land ==
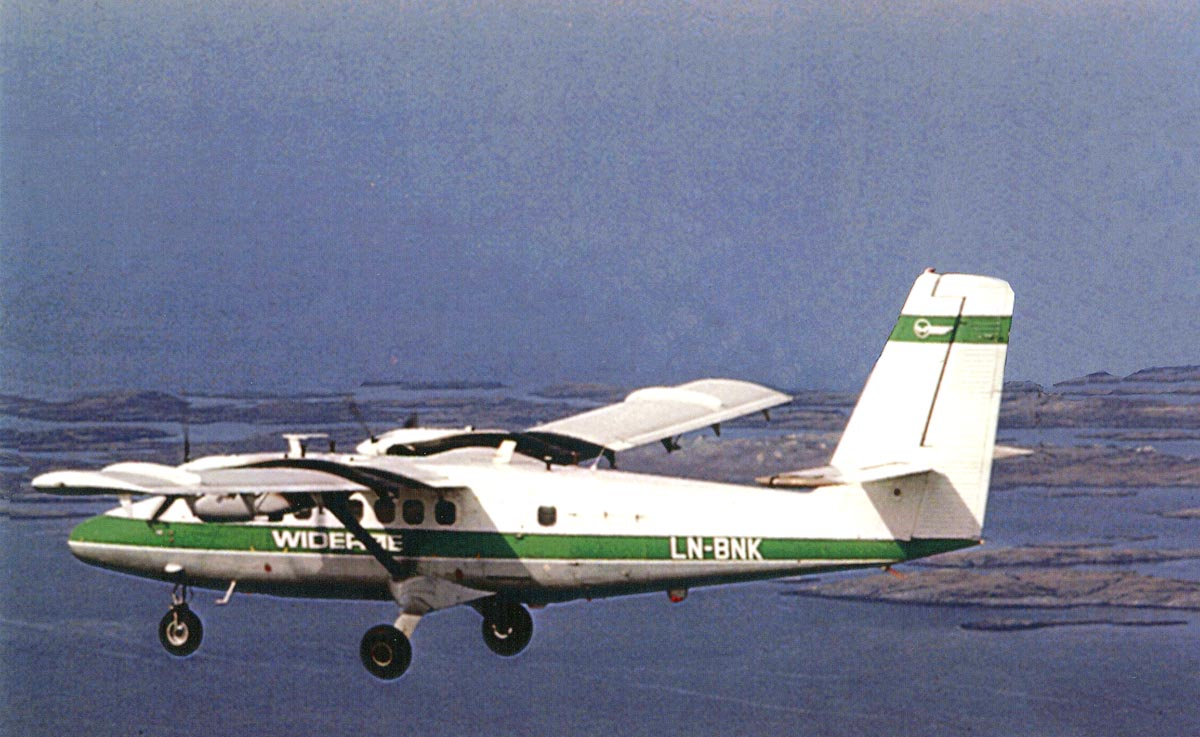
A Twin Otter in late 1970s; this aircraft would be destroyed in Widerøe Flight 933 in 1982.

A government committee, led by Erik Himle and later Preben Munthe, was appointed in 1962 to consider additional airports in Norway. SAS was about to phase in the Sud Aviation Caravelle jet aircraft on the main domestic routes. In 1964, the committee recommended that nine new airports be built that could serve jetliners. Widerøe and other major airlines came with an alternate proposal for a network of smaller airports that could be served using short take-off and landing (STOL) aircraft. Smaller airports could be built and operated at lower costs than larger airports, but both airports and airlines would need subsidies to operate. Håkon Kyllingmark was appointed Minister of Transport and Communications in 1965 and was a proponent of the STOLports. The political rationale was that, despite that the total operating costs would rise, that it would provide better services to rural areas and thus keep up their population. Parliament passed the proposal, which included building three of the intended nine primary airports.

The first four airports were located in Helgeland between Bodø and Trondheim: Mo i Rana Airport, Røssvoll; Sandnessjøen Airport, Stokka; Brønnøysund Airport, Brønnøy; and Namsos Airport, Høknesøra. Each airport had an 800-metre (2,600 ft) long and 30-metre (98 ft) wide runway, in addition to a small terminal building. Since Widerøe held the Helgeland sea concession, they were offered to operate the route with state and SAS subsidies. The routes would take into use 19-passenger de Havilland Canada DHC-6 Twin Otter and would allow all-year connections to the primary Trondheim and Bodø Airport. The airline rented a hangar at Trondheim Airport, and all pilots were re-certified to C- and instrument certificates. The first service was 1 July 1968. The following year, the company received NOK 1 million in state grants for the sea operations and NOK 850,000 in SAS grants for the Helgeland route.

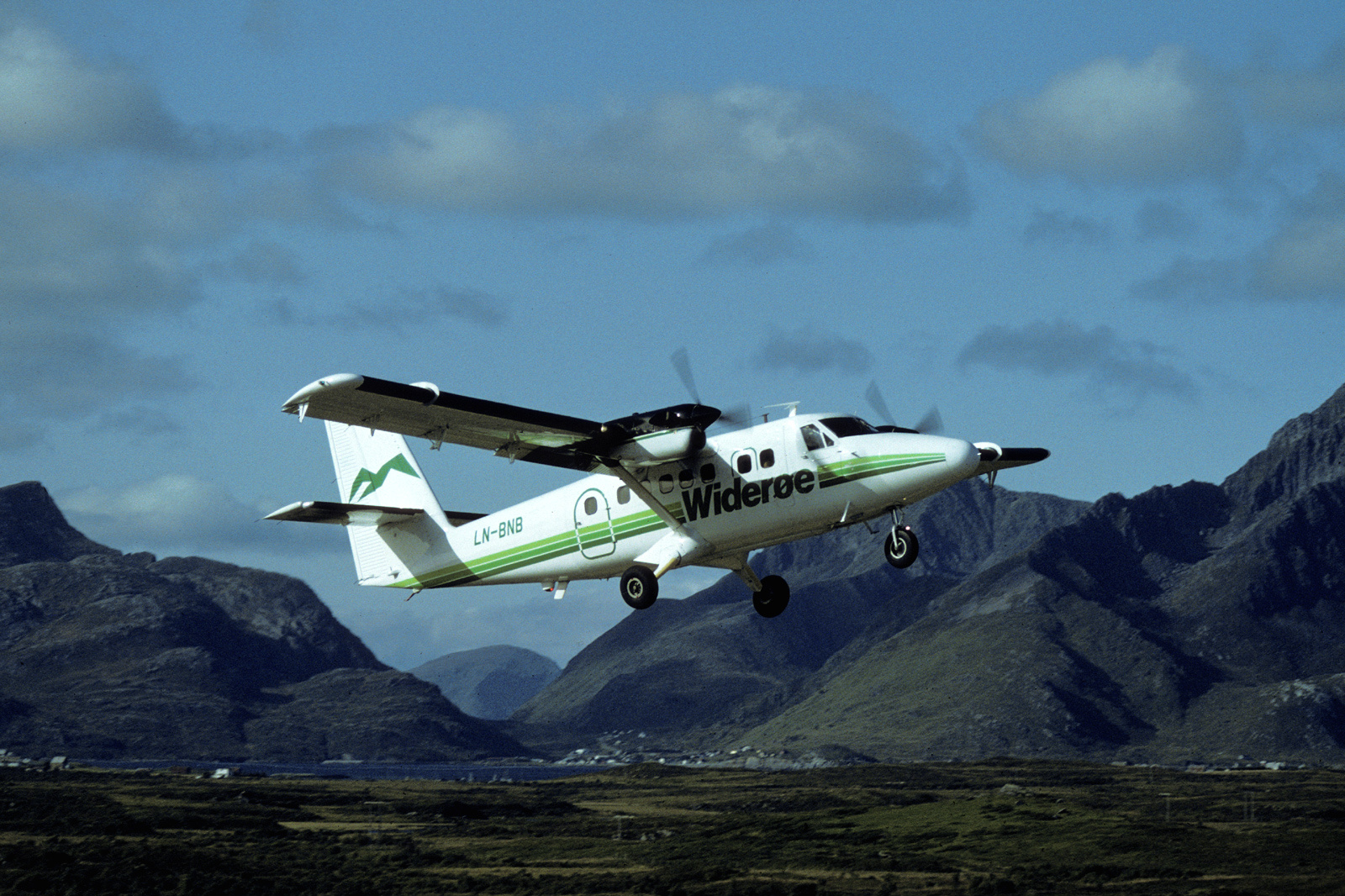
A Twin Otter at Leknes Airport in 1992

Despite higher income than prognoses, Widerøe lost money on the trials. But they proved highly popular among the passengers and in 1969 Parliament approved construction of the rest of the national regional network. The same year, SAS bought Forenede Industrier's shares in Widerøe, and Per Bergsland replaced Viggo Widerøe as CEO. The company was split in two in 1970: the aerial photography division was sold to the competitor Fjellanger, resulting in Fjellanger Widerøe. Scheduled services remained with Widerøe. The technical division at Fornebu was sold to Fred Olsen Air Transport and a second Twin Otter was bought. A twenty percent primary placement was issued in 1971 and the company moved its head office to Bodø. At the end of the seaplane season, the ambulance stations in Bodø and Tromsø and the three remaining Otters were sold. Widerøe became a pure land-based, scheduled airline.

The company bought a 817-square-meter (8,790 sq ft) hangar at Bodø Airport to use as a technical base. They sold one Twin Otter, but received a permanent concession for both the Helgeland route and for the new airports on the West Coast—Florø Airport—Førde Airport, Øyrane and Sogndal Airport, Haukåsen—which were connected to Bergen Airport, Flesland. The company also received permission to fly between Bergen Airport; Ålesund Airport, Vigra; Kristiansund Airport, Kvernberget; and Ørland Airport. It also took over some of SAS flights between Bodø Airport, Bardufoss Airport, Andøya Airport, Andenes and Tromsø Airport. A new technical base was built in Florø and had a 900-square-meter (9,700 sq ft) hangar and six employees. The new routes started on 1 July 1971. Exactly one year later the airports in Vesterålen were opened—Svolvær Airport, Helle; Leknes Airport and Stokmarknes Airport, Skagen—which were connected to Bodø. Molde Airport, Årø was opened on 5 April 1972 and added to the West Coast route. Five Twin Otters were in use in 1972, with an additional two added in 1973.

== Dash 7 ==
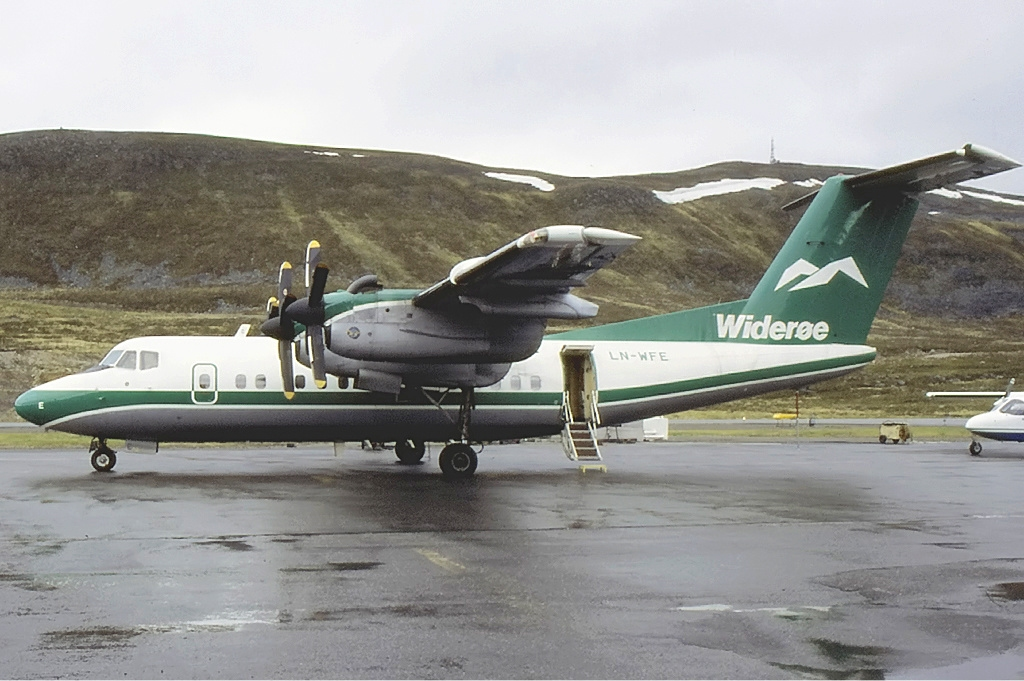
A de Havilland Canada Dash 7 at Hammerfest Airport in 1987

The routes to Røst and Værøy were changed to a helicopter service in 1972, initially subcontracted to Helilift, which used two Sikorsky S-58Ts. In 1973 Widerøe received NOK 1.9 million in state subsidies for the helicopter route and NOK 13.6 million for the regional routes. That year the company signed an option for two de Havilland Canada DHC-7 Dash 7s. Widerøe tested a route from Sogndal to Oslo over the mountains from 1 May to 30 September 1974. On 1 August, five airports were opened in northern Troms and Finnmark: Sørkjosen Airport, Hammerfest Airport, Mehamn Airport, Båtsfjord Airport and Vadsø Airport; these connected to Tromsø, Alta Airport, Lakselv Airport, Banak and Kirkenes Airport, Høybuktmoen. The Finnmark route required the delivery of two additional Twin Otters and a technical base was built at Hammerfest. Three more airports opened in the following years: Sandane Airport, Anda on 1 July 1975, Narvik Airport, Framnes on 1 October 1975 and Honningsvåg Airport, Valan on 1 July 1977. By 1978 the company had twelve Twin Otters.

The remaining Sikorsky helicopter was bought from Helilift in 1976 and the operations transferred to Offshore Helicopters. It crashed in 1977 and a new Sikorsky S-58T was bought in 1978. Offshore Helicopters was bought by Helikopter Service in 1980, which took over operations and introduced Bell 212 helicopters from 1 January 1982. Starting on 10 April 1980, Widerøe started an international service on behalf of SAS on the route from Trondheim to Åre Östersund Airport and Sundsvall Airport in Sweden. Services terminated on 28 April 1982. The Sogndal–Oslo route became permanent in 1979, but only during the summer. A Twin Otter simulator was bought in 1981.

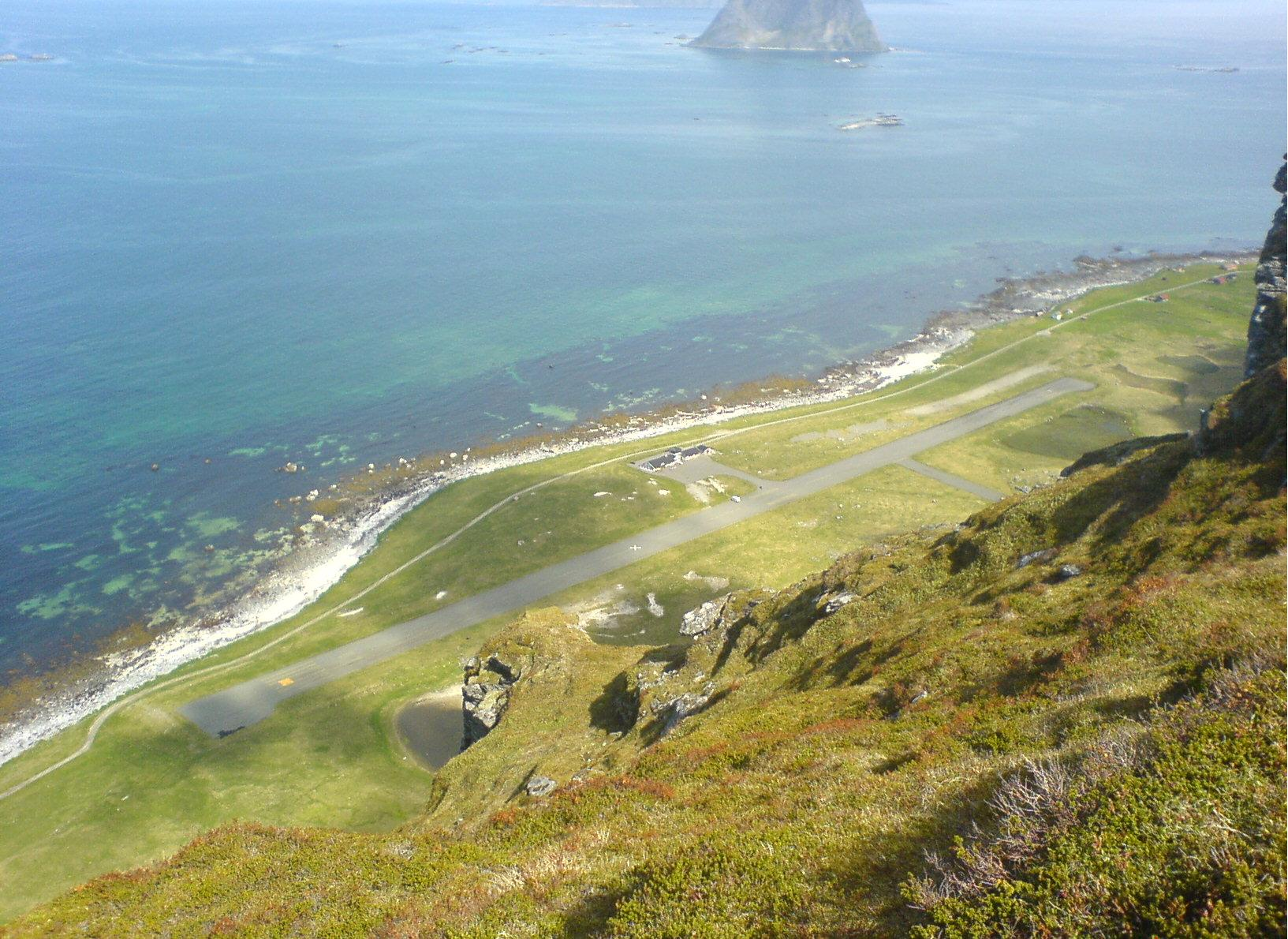
Værøy Airport opened in 1986 and closed in 1990 after Widerøe Flight 839

.

On 11 March 1982 Flight 933 crashed into the Barents Sea between Berlevåg and Mehamn, killing all fifteen people on board the Twin Otter. The accident was caused by structural failure in the rudder and vertical stabilizer following severe clear-air turbulence. A conspiracy theory concerning a collision with a British Harrier fighter led to four investigations, none of which found any evidence of a collision.

The first two Dash 7s entered service in March and May 1981, with a third delivered in April 1983. They had a capacity for 50 passengers, and Widerøe introduced flight attendants and cabin pressurization for the first time in the company's history. From September 1983 the Dash 7s were used on the all-year route Oslo–Sogndal–Florø. Following SAS's rearrangement of routes in Northern Norway in 1983, Widerøe was subcontracted the routes Tromsø–Lakselv, Bardufoss–Bodø, and Tromsø–Harstad/Narvik Airport, Evenes–Bodø, all to be flown with Dash 7, as were the routes to Hammerfest and Vadsø. This required a further two Dash 7s to be delivered. By 1986 Widerøe had taken delivery of eight Dash 7s and the airline has operated 20 Twin Otters through history. Parliament passed a new series of regional airports in 1984. The airport in Førde was moved to Bringeland and three airports opened in Nordland—Værøy Airport, Røst Airport and Mosjøen Airport, Kjærstad—all served by Widerøe from they opened in 1986 and 1987. Following the demise of Norving, Widerøe took over flights to Rørvik Airport, Ryum in 1988 and three Finnmark airports in 1990—Hasvik Airport, Båtsfjord Airport and Vardø Airport, Svartnes. In 1986 Widerøe transported 816,000 passengers and had a revenue of NOK 479 million, of which NOK 87.7 was subsidies. From 20 October the airline banned smoking on its twelve Twin Otters and eight Dash 7s.

Flight 710 took place on 6 May 1988 when a Dash 7 crashed into Torghatten during a landing approach, killing all 36 aboard. The controlled flight into terrain was in part caused by poor cockpit communication and the investigation discovered shortcomings in the airline's safety routines. It remains the worst accident involving a Dash 7 and is the fourth-deadliest aviation accident on Norwegian soil. A replacement Dash 7 was delivered in 1990. Flight 839 crashed one minute after take-off from Værøy Airport on 12 April 1990, killing all five on board the Twin Otter. The cause of the accident was the turbulence and high wind speeds around the airport. The airport was immediately closed after the incident; no public flights have taken off from the airport since. The airport was replaced by Værøy Heliport in 1995.

== Widerøe Norsk Air ==
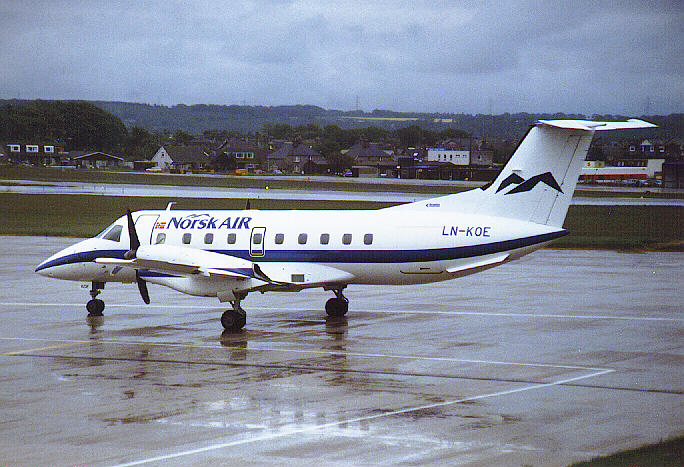
Norsk Air Embraer EMB-120 Brasilia at Aberdeen Airport in 1989

Norsk Air, based at Sandefjord Airport, Torp, operated a fleet of Embraer EMB 120 Brasilia regional aircraft, providing both domestic and international services from Torp and Skien Airport, Geiteryggen to Bergen, Stavanger, Trondheim and Copenhagen. The company was owned by the conglomerate Kosmos, when fell into financial distress in 1988. Kosmos was bought by the Skaugen Group and decided to divest all non-core activities, including the airline. Negotiations were started between Norsk Air and Widerøe regarding a take-over. Widerøe saw the strategic advantage of having non-subsidized routes to better benchmark its operations. However, neither SAS nor Braathens SAFE wanted Widerøe to purchase Norsk Air, in part because they feared it could cannibalize their own operations. Fred. Olsen & Co. liked the idea and bought SAS' and Braathens SAFE's stake in Widerøe to make the deal possible, consisting of a 22-percent stake owned by SAS and 18 percent owned by Braathens SAFE. This gave Fred. Olsen an 82-percent stake in the company.

Norsk Air had 156 employees and 150,000 annual passengers in 1989. The employees agreed to cut their wages with ten percent and not take sick days during the sales process. One of the main difficulties issues was that Widerøe could not afford to purchase Norsk Air's hangar. Widerøe wanted to continue operations at both Torp and Geiteryggen for a year and then determine where to locate its base. In fear that the airline would move to Skien, Sandefjord Municipality and Stokke Municipality, who owned the majority of the airport, agreed to purchase the hangar, which had been built for NOK 20 million in 1987, for NOK 11.5 million. Half the hangar would be rented to Widerøe for NOK 500,000 per year. This was insufficient to cover the NOK 1.2 million in annual interest costs.

Widerøe took over Norsk Air free of charge on 1 May 1989 and changed the company's name to Widerøe Norsk Air. The company was kept as a subsidiary to avoid cross-subsidization of the subsidized routes. Widerøe agreed to lease a Fokker 50 from Busy Bee from 1990 in exchange for Busy Bee terminating its Sandefjord routes. Widerøe Norsk Air decided that it was not profitable to fly from both Skien and Sandefjord, and terminated all Skien services from 1990. Starting on 28 October 1991, the airline also started a route from Sandefjord via Kristiansand Airport, Kjevik to London, but the route was terminated after a year. The Fokker 50 was sold to Norwegian Air Shuttle in 1993. Widerøe Norsk Air was merged with the mother company on 1 May 1996.

== Introducing the Dash 8 ==
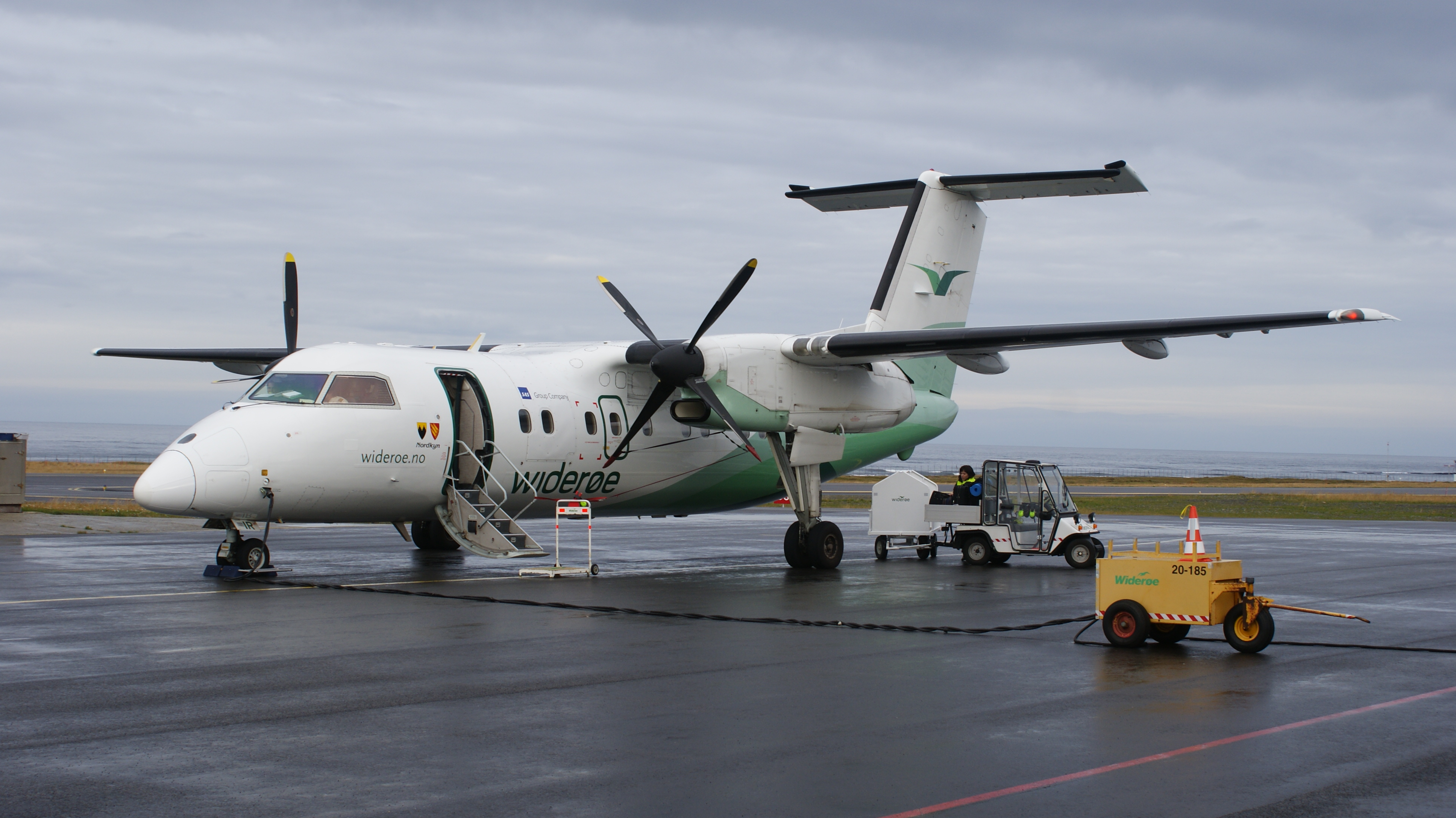
Dash 8–100 at Berlevåg Airport

Widerøe issued feedback for its future aircraft needs to de Havilland Canada during the design phase of the Dash 8. In particular Widerøe wanted to operate an aircraft able to operate on 800-meter (2,600 ft) runways. Widerøe's management stated their intent in 1988 to purchase the Dash 8; the only other alternative aircraft that could operate on the network was the CASA 212, Dornier 228 and an upgraded Twin Otter. None of the alternatives had a pressurized cabin. The Dash 8 would be the largest and also the most expensive alternative. The Civil Aviation Administration stated in January 1989 that the Dash 8 would not be approved for the regional airports because it would require a visual landing angle of six instead of three degrees and that it was undesirable to have to such systems. They further stated that the only alternative was to extend all the runways to 1,200 meters (3,900 ft). The cost of a new or additional visual landing system was estimated at NOK 4 million per airport. To gain support for the aircraft, a Dash 8 was leased from Tyrolean Airways for demonstrations. The ministry stated that at the time it was difficult filling the Twin Otters and that additional capacity was not needed for routes in Finnmark. Widerøe's initial plan was to purchase two aircraft immediately and then take delivery of one more per year until 2000. However, this would result the airline operating three classes of aircraft simultaneously.

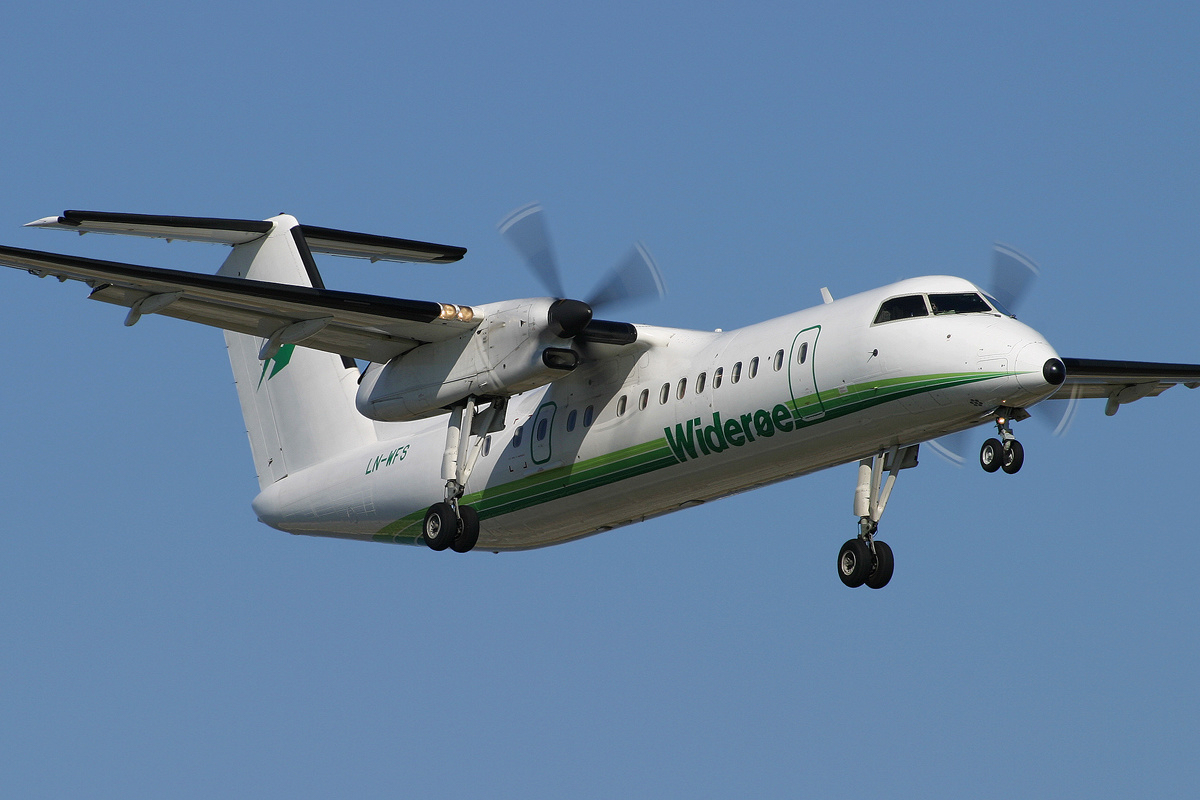
A Dash 8-300 landing in 2004

The subsidy model was changed in 1991. Previously the government guaranteed for the operating deficits; Widerøe was opposed to this as it they could never make an up-side on the operations. From 1991 the state paid Widerøe a negotiated price for the route and if Widerøe could make additional cost savings they would retain the money. Widerøe carried out a public issuing of new shares worth NOK 30 million in 1991. Major purchasers were regional transport companies in Northern Norway and Sogn og Fjordane. The largest owners after the restructuring were Torghatten Trafikkselskap (14.8 percent), Fylkesbaatane i Sogn og Fjordane (11.5 percent) and Nordlandsbanken (4.9 percent).

The Dornier 328 was also considered as a replacement aircraft. Widerøe estimated a subsidy need in 1997 of NOK 204 million with Twin Otter and Dash 7 operation, NOK 237 million with the Dorniers and NOK 271 million with the Dash 8. In November 1992 Widerøe stuck a deal with de Havilland Canada which would give a discount on the order and early delivery of four aircraft. After governmental approval the deal for fifteen aircraft was signed in December, costing NOK 976 million. The deal was financed through a loan of NOK 769 million combined with the sales price of the Twin Otters and Dash 7s. Parliament voted in December 1992 to extend Widerøe's concessions until 1 April 1997, after which they would be subject to public service obligation tenders in accordance with European Union regulations. Compared with a 1992 subsidy of NOK 205 million, the deal granted NOK 1.3 billion from 1993 to 1997, which largely would finance Widerøe's acquisition of an all-Dash 8 fleet. Opposition politicians stated that the financing model would give Widerøe an unfair advantage when tenders were introduced from 1997.

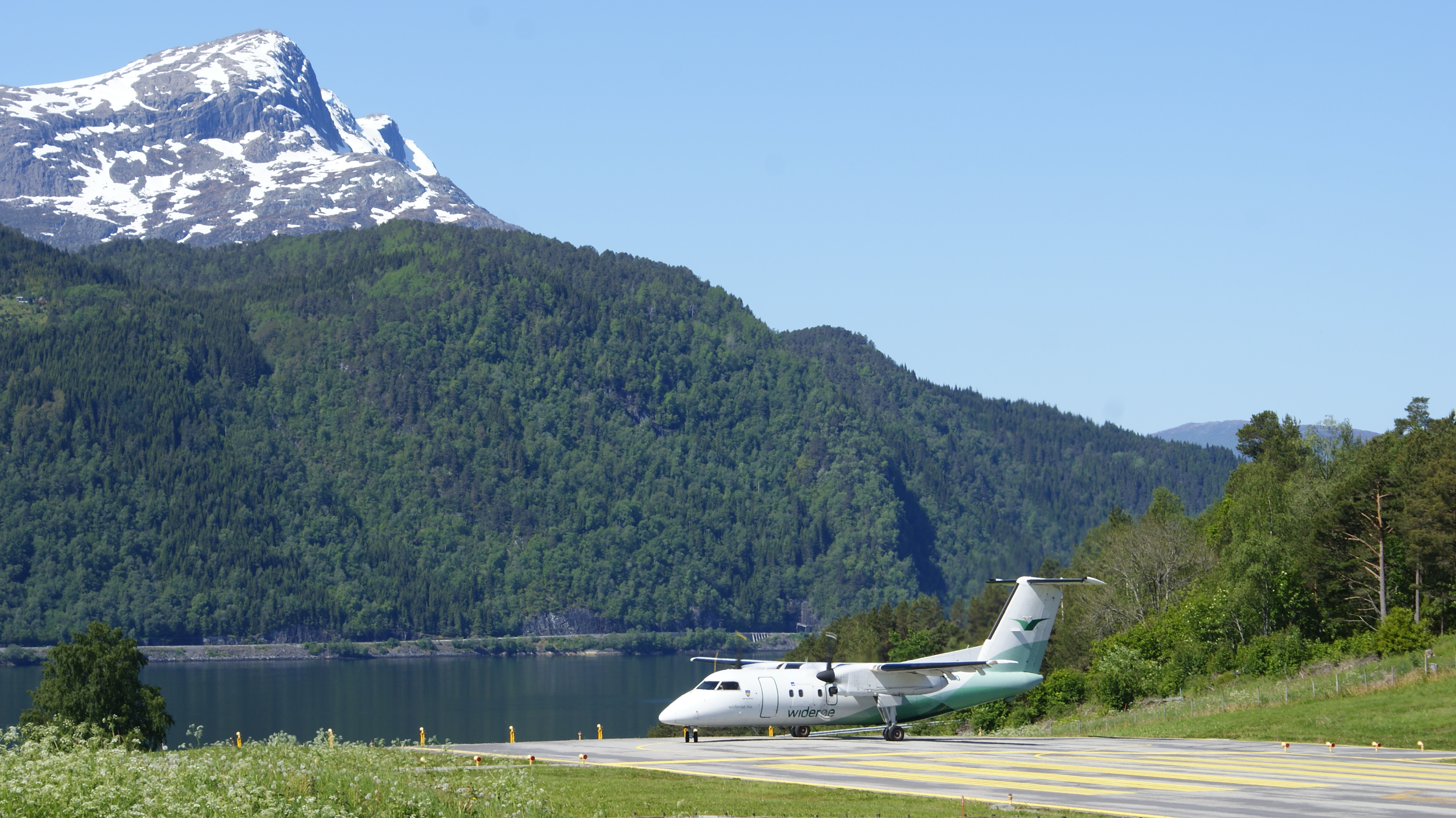
A Dash 8–100 at Sandane Airport, Anda in 2009

Flight 744 took place on 27 October 1993 when a Twin Otter crashed in a controlled flight into terrain during approach to Namsos Airport, Høknesøra. Six of the nineteen people on board were killed. The report found no technical problems with the aircraft. However, it found several pilot errors and laid a large responsibility on the airline for lack of proper organization and routines. No-one was charged after the accident, but lead to a major restructure of operations and procedures in Widerøe. By 1996 Widerøe had undertaken a series of operational amendments after recommendation from the commission, including a reorganization of the aircraft operation division, the quality insurance division and the company's reporting systems. Another concern was that pilots did not follow the company's routines, resulting in the company grounding about ten pilots which did not follow policy or conducted too many errors during observations. Some received additional training while others were retired.

The Dash 8 purchasing contract contained an option to cancel the last seven aircraft. Widerøe had problems securing financing of new aircraft, while de Havilland Canada experienced a dried-up aircraft market in 1993. Therefore, the manufacturer and airline struck a deal in November, where Widerøe would waive their option rights in exchange for de Havilland purchasing the remaining five Twin Otters and five Dash 7s for NOK 160 million. The deal also accelerated the delivery time, resulting in the fifteenth Dash 8 being delivered in December 1995. The last two Dash 7s were retired in August 1996. After the upgrades to the navigational aids, all but two airports were ready for the Dash 8. Both Hasvik and Båtsfjord Airport had gravel runways, which the Dash 8 could not handle. This resulted in Hasvik Airport having its runway paved in 1995. Båtsfjord Airport was poorly located in the terrain and Parliament therefore decided to build a new airport, which opened in 1999. This forced Widerøe to keep one Twin Otter in operation until 1 April 2000 to serve Båtsfjord.

== Competition ==
The Norwegian aviation market was deregulated from 1 April 1994. Widerøe saw the opportunity to start a series of international routes. The first was a twice-weekly service from Kirkenes to Murmansk Airport in Russia using a Twin Otter which started in June 1994. A route from Bodø to Hemavan Airport and Umeå Airport in Sweden started on 2 February 1995 and a summer route from Bergen to Sumburgh Airport in Shetland started in May. The Swedish service was terminated later the same year. SAS terminated its route from Oslo to Göteborg Landvetter Airport in Sweden in 1996, which was immediately taken over by Widerøe. A route from Oslo to Berlin Tempelhof Airport commenced on 1 April 1997, and from 26 October a route was flown daily from Stavanger to Glasgow Airport and a daily service between Stavanger and Bergen. However, the Glasgow service was terminated on 14 November 1999.

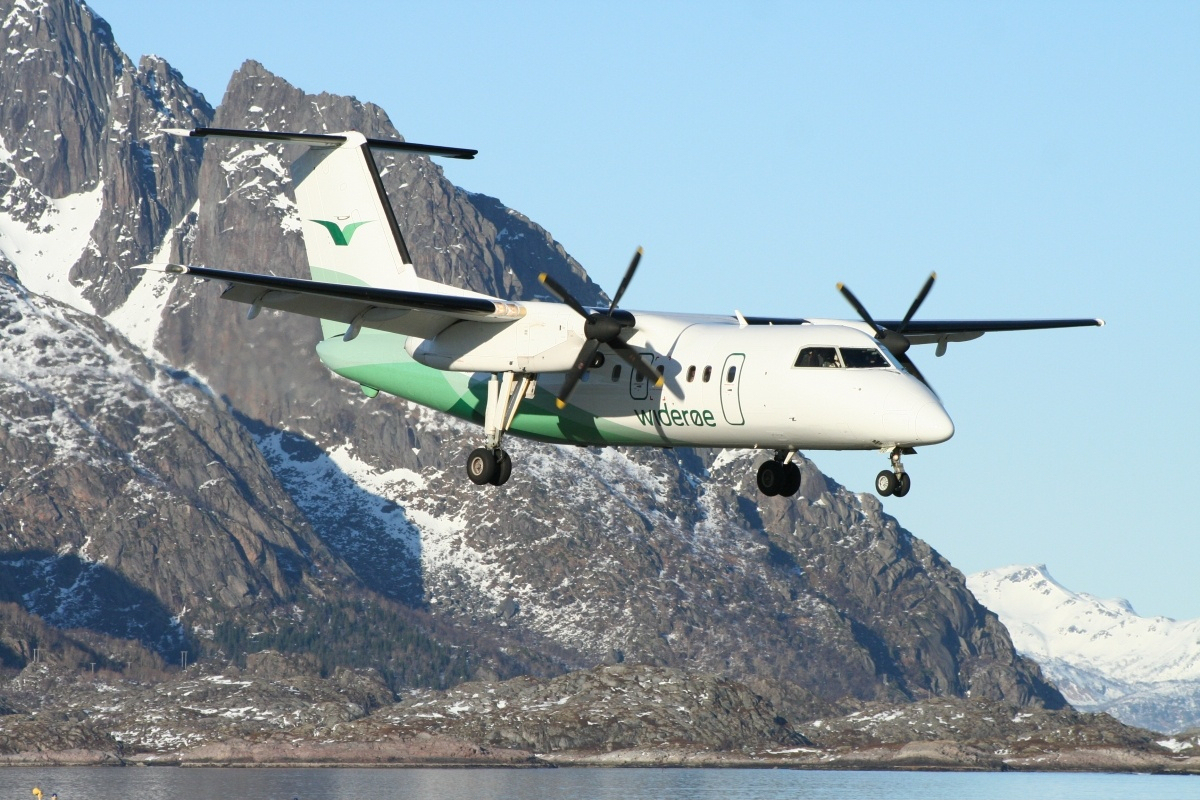
Dash 8-100 landing at Svolvær Airport, Helle

Six airlines—all Norwegian—bid in the inaugural PSO tender. Widerøe was the cheapest contender for all packages and reduced their annual subsidy from NOK 277 to 213 million, thus securing all PSO routes in the country from 1 April 1997 to 31 March 2000. The SAS Group bought Fred. Olsen's 63.2-percent stake of Widerøe in November 1997, costing NOK 325 million. The purchase was split in two with SAS executing an option for 29 percent in late 1998. SAS announced plans to better integrate the two airline's services, with particular focus on Gardermoen and Torp. SAS articulated in June the following year that they were considering reducing their stake in Widerøe and listing it on Oslo Stock Exchange; nothing came of the plans.

Oslo Airport, Gardermoen opened on 8 October 1998, the same day as Fornebu closed. All of Widerøe's Oslo flights were moved from Fornebu to Gardermoen. Widerøe experienced competition from Braathens from late 1999 when they introduced services from Sandefjord to Bergen and Stavanger. Widerøe introduced daily flights between Sandefjord and Stockholm Arlanda Airport from 6 April. Braathens terminated its Sandefjord services from 1 November, stating that it was providing the most deficit of any route. Widerøe won a one-year PSO contract to fly from Fagernes Airport, Leirin from 1 August, but failed to renew the contract the following year. Following KLM UK's termination of its Stavanger to Aberdeen Airport route, Widerøe started a daily service from 7 November.

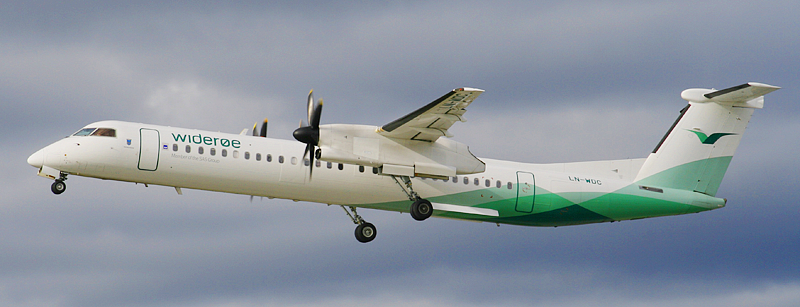
Dash 8-Q400

For the second PSO contract period, which started on 1 April 2000, Widerøe lost two routes: the Vardø service by Arctic Air and the Florø service was taken over by Coast Air. The latter forced Widerøe to move its technical base for southern Norway to Gardermoen. The Røst contract was awarded to GuardAir, but the company folded in 2001 and Widerøe resumed the route. The Murmansk service was terminated in 2000, and Berlin followed suit on 1 August 2001. Braathens terminated its service to Røros Airport on 1 January 2001 and Widerøe won the subsequent PSO contract which ran from 1 August 2001 to 31 March 2003. Widerøe announced in June 2001 that they had ordered three 72-seat Dash 8-Q400s, with an option for a further five.

The SAS Group took full ownership of Widerøe in May 2002, paying NOK 131.2 million to raise their stake to 96.4 percent, after purchasing 33.1 percent of the company from Nordlandsbanken, Torghatten and Fylkesbaatane. After the 2002 acquisition of Braathens by the SAS Group, they decided to operate Braathens' regional routes in Western Norway with the SAS Commuter's Fokker 50 aircraft until then operating in Northern Norway. The routes in Western Norway were until then operated by Norwegian Air Shuttle. SAS Commuter left its operations in Northern Norway to Widerøe, who took over all the SAS Group's regional routes north of Trondheim. This consisted of the routes from Tromsø to Alta, Lakselv and Kirkenes and the route from Harstad/Narvik to Tromsø, Bodø and Trondheim from October 2002. Widerøe took over SAS's route from Trondheim to Copenhagen on 27 October.

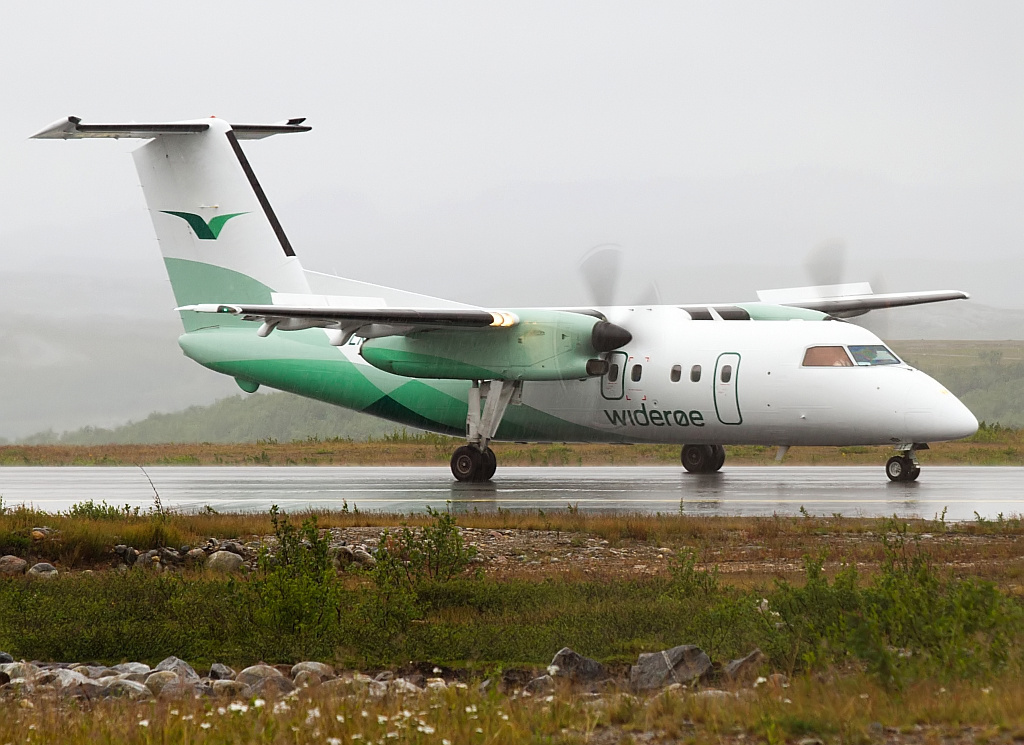
Dash 8-100 landing in heavy rain and 20&knots (10 m/s) winds at Kirkenes Airport, Høybuktmoen

In the 2003 PSO contract Widerøe lost the right to fly to Røst and Narvik to Kato Airline. Norwegian Air Shuttle won the contracts to Lakselv and Andenes. From 2004 Widerøe introduced summer routes from Oslo to Visby, Sweden, and from Bergen to Shetland; the latter was terminated after the end of the 2005 season. Services from Bergen to Edinburgh Airport and Newcastle International Airport were introduced on 20 January 2006. In the 2006 PSO round Widerøe was awarded the routes to Narvik, but lost the rights to fly to Røros. Widerøe started a direct service from Trondheim to Stockholm on 26 March 2006. Later that year the airline carried out cutbacks, terminating the Trondheim to Stockholm route and reducing the Stavanger–Bergen services from three times a day to once per week. Coast Air pulled out of the Andenes contract in 2007, allowing Widerøe to reclaim the contract from 1 April in an extraordinary PSO tender. A summer service to Bornholm Airport in Denmark was introduced from the 2007 season. Following the Dash 8 landing gear incidents which saw three SAS Dash 8-Q400s be written off, the SAS Group grounded Widerøe's Q400s in October 2007. An order for seven NextGen Q400s, with an option for a further two, was placed in March 2008; five were delivered later that year and two in 2009. Following Coast Air's bankruptcy in January 2008, Widerøe was awarded a short-term contract to operate to Røros. In the 2009 PSO tender, Røros was the only contract Widerøe lost.

Scandinavian Airlines announced on 15 February 2010 that Widerøe would take over their regional routes connecting airports in Western Norway. SAS retired their five Fokker 50 aircraft in November and Widerøe took over the operations and 75 employees using Q300 and Q400 aircraft. Widerøe, who have lower wage costs and economies of scale derived from other regional operation in Norway, had planned the take-over of the SAS routes in the mid-2000s. This had however been canceled after an employee at the SAS Group, not knowing about Widerøe's plans, had renewed the lease of the Fokker 50s for another five years.

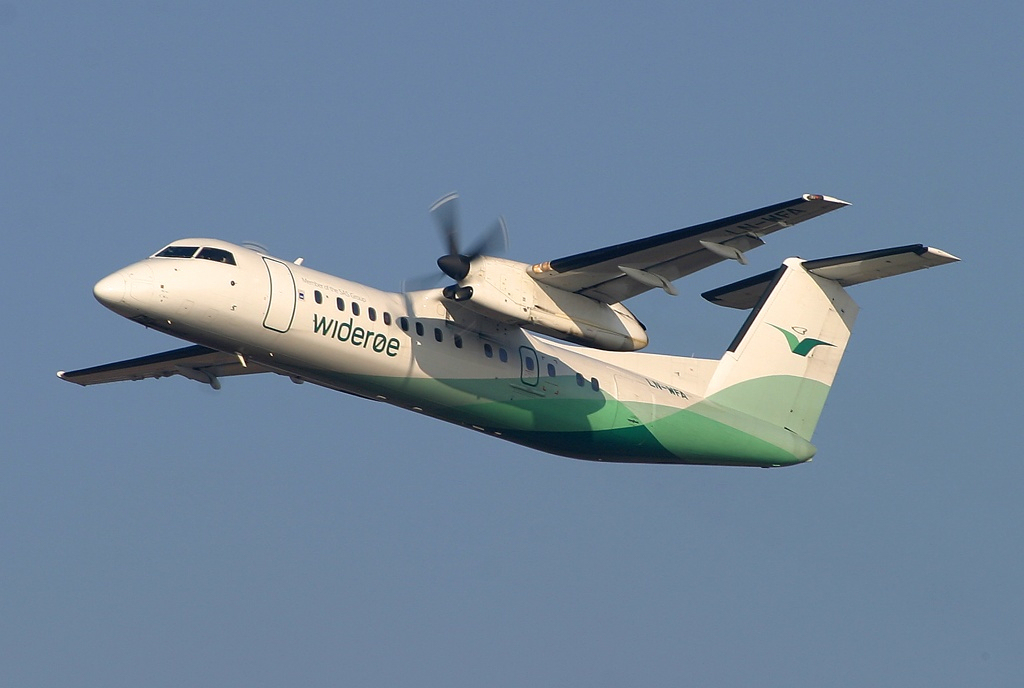
Dash 8-300

Widerøe was able to reclaim the Florø contract in the 2012 tender, after they bid to operate the route without subsidies. The routes to Svolvær, Leknes, Røst and Narvik were awarded to Danish Air Transport, but two weeks before operations were to start the Civil Aviation Authority of Norway stated that DAT did not meet the safety requirements, resulting in Widerøe instead being awarded the contract. The main issue resolved around the installation of the SCAT-I landing system; the time from the tender was completed until the operations started was two weeks, but it took eight months to install the system. DAT stated that the introduction of the SCAT-I-system had resulted in a de facto monopoly for Widerøe. Widerøe also regained the Røros route, so that after the 2012 contracts Widerøe operates all PSO routes except to Fagernes.

The SAS Group announced in November 2012 that it intended to sell Widerøe—which SAS estimated was worth between NOK 0.9 and 1.3 billion—because of the group's financial difficulties. Potential purchasers include Torghatten Trafikkselskap, Braathens Aviation and Finncomm. A group of employees have stated that they are interested in purchasing a minority stake. By February 2013 there was little progress in the sales plans, in part because Widerøe owned the SAS Group NOK 600 million in group contributions, which would they would have to pay before a sale. After such a payment Widerøe would have a net negative equity.
