= Jens Müller =

Jens Müller may refer to:

- Jens Müller (pilot) (1917–1999), Norwegian pilot and World War II POW
- Jens Müller (luger) (born 1965), East German-German Olympic luger
- Jaye Muller (Jens Mueller, born 1967), East German singer
