= Bram van der Stok =

Dutch fighter pilot

- Bram van der Stok
- Born: 13 October 1915; Plaju, Dutch East Indies
- Died: 8 February 1993 (aged 77); Virginia Beach, Virginia, United States
- Military career
- Allegiance: Netherlands
- Branch: Royal Netherlands Air and Space Force; Royal Air Force
- Service years: 1936–1945
- Conflicts: World War II
- Awards: Officer of the Order of Orange-Nassau; Bronze Lion; Bronze Cross; Member of the Order of the British Empire (United Kingdom)

Abraham Lamertus "Bram" van der Stok, MBE (13 October 1915 – 8 February 1993), also known as Bob van der Stok, was a World War II fighter pilot and flying ace, and is the most decorated aviator in Dutch history.

In March 1944, he broke out of Stalag Luft III – a prisoner-of-war camp in Nazi Germany – during the mass break-out known as "The Great Escape". After crossing much of occupied Europe, to reach neutral Spain, Van der Stok became one of only three out of the 76 escapees to reach Britain, along with two Norwegians, Per Bergsland and Jens Müller (who together managed to reach neutral Sweden).

== Early years ==
Van der Stok spent his childhood between Sumatra, the Netherlands, and the Dutch West Indies, where his father was employed with Shell Petroleum. After finishing his primary education at the Lyceum Alpinum in Switzerland, he studied medicine at Leiden University with the intention of pursuing a career as a physician.

While at Leiden he was an enthusiastic sportsman with a particular interest in rowing and ice hockey. In 1937, he joined the Reserve of the Netherlands' Luchtvaartafdeeling (Army Aviation Group) – a precursor of the Royal Netherlands Air Force, training on the Fokker S.IV, while continuing his medical studies at Utrecht University.

== World War II ==
When the Netherlands was attacked and invaded by the Third Reich in May 1940, Van der Stok – now flying with the Netherlands' Air Force's renamed Luchtvaartbrigade (Army Aviation Brigade), scored his first victory when he shot down a Luftwaffe Messerschmitt Bf 109 while on patrol in a Fokker D.XXI over De Kooy airfield, and also took part in an air attack on the Netherlands' Waalhaven Airport, which had been seized by the Germans and was being used by the Luftwaffe for operations.

After the Netherlands' defeat and occupation by the Wehrmacht, he made three unsuccessful attempts to follow the Dutch Crown in its withdrawal across the North Sea to England. On the fourth attempt, he managed to reach Scotland in June 1941 as a stowaway aboard the Swiss merchant ship Saint Cerque, which had sailed out of Rotterdam, along with Erik Hazelhoff Roelfzema, Peter Tazelaar, Gerard Volkersz and Toon Buitendijk.

Following a refresher and conversion course with the Royal Air Force's No.57 Operational Training Unit, he was posted to its No.41 Squadron in December 1941 flying the Supermarine Spitfire, with which he went on to achieve six confirmed kills amongst Luftwaffe aircraft up to April 1942, qualifying him as a flying ace.

=== Capture, imprisonment and escape ===
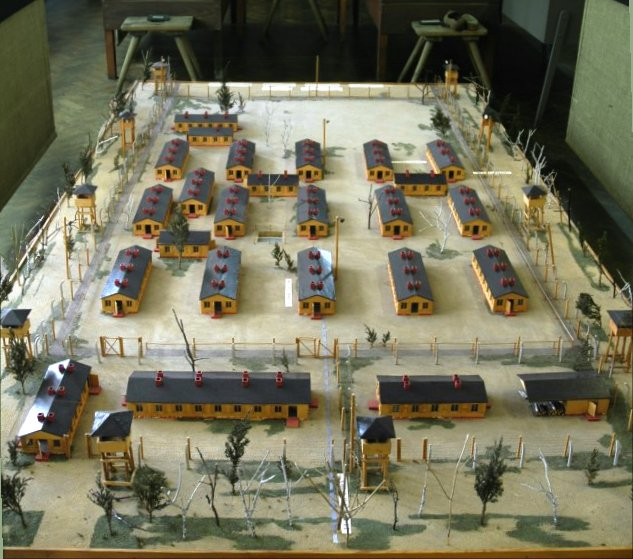
Stalag Luft III mockup.

On 12 April 1942, during an operation code-named 'Circus 122' over occupied North France to attack the railway marshalling yard at Hazebrouck, Van der Stok was shot down while flying a Spitfire Vb BL595. He parachuted down safely at Saint-Omer in the Pas-de-Calais, but was immediately captured by a Wehrmacht patrol. (Note: In his war memoir, Van der Stok cites the date of his capture as 14 July 1942, but from his original RAF 'Escape & Evasion Report' (dated 11 July 1944) at England's National Archive, the date of capture is given as 12 April 1942.)

He was subsequently incarcerated in the newly built Stalag Luft III where, with his medical training, he worked in the prison's medical facility. While at Stalag Luft III, he made three escape attempts. The first was inadvertently spoiled by another prisoner who drew attention to the escaping Van der Stok while retrieving a stolen German cap from the roof of a hut. The second attempt was thwarted when the German guards noticed that a forged pass he was using to get past them was out of date. His third attempt, on the night of 24–25 March 1944, was as a part of the mass break-out later known as "The Great Escape", in which he was the 18th of 76 prisoners to leave the escape tunnel.

In his memoir he describes the moment he came out of the tunnel on 24 March, writing:

"Quickly, I climbed up to the surface and immediately found the rope... I felt no signal, so it was not safe yet. Then I felt three distinct tugs and slowly popped my head up. The nearest 'Goonbox' was at least 200 feet away but, indeed, I was 20 feet from the edge of the woods."

After the break-out, Van der Stok travelled from Breslau train station to Dresden where he was stopped at several checkpoints, convincing the Germans that he was not one of the escapees. He then travelled to Utrecht through Oldenzaal and met up with a member of the Dutch underground, who briefed and equipped him for a bicycle trek to another safe house run by the Belgian Resistance. After arriving there, he was given the paperwork of a Belgian, and then travelled by train via Brussels and Paris to Toulouse, where the French Resistance put him with two American lieutenants, two other RAF pilots, a French officer and a Russian, and took the group across the Pyrenees to Lleida in Spain. The British consulate in Spain accepted the Allied escapees and, three months after the break-out of Stalag Luft III, Van der Stok reached British Empire territory once again by arriving in Gibraltar on 8 July 1944. He was subsequently flown from Gibraltar to Whitchurch Airport in England on 11 July 1944. (Note: In his war memoir, Van der Stok gives the date of his arrival in England as 20 May 1944, but his original RAF 'Escape & Evasion Report' (dated 11 July 1944) at England's National Archive gives the actual date as 11 July 1944.)

Back in England, Van der Stok rejoined the RAF and was posted to No. 41 Squadron flying the Spitfire MK.XII's, going on to fight in Operation Overlord - (10 days after D-Day) and the anti-V-1 fighter aircraft sweeps along the Low Countries coast. In his book War Pilot of Orange, he claims to have downed seven V-1 'Doodlebugs'. The following year, he took command of the Dutch RAF No. 322 Squadron, based then on a temporary airstrip at Schijndel in the Netherlands, where, coming into contact with his family for the first time since he had left the Netherlands in 1940, he learned that his two brothers had been killed in concentration camps and his father had been partially blinded by the Gestapo.

== Postwar and later life ==
He was awarded the Order of Orange Nassau from the Netherlands, and was inducted as a Member of the Order of the British Empire. He was offered a permanent commission and senior staff rank with the Royal Netherlands Air Force, but declined it and instead resumed and completed his prewar study, qualifying with a degree in medicine from the University of Utrecht in 1951.

He relocated to the United States with his wife Lucia and their three children, and began practise as an Obstetrics and gynaecology in Syracuse, New York, and as a general practitioner in Ruidoso, New Mexico. He subsequently joined NASA's space lab research team in Huntsville, Alabama. In 1980 he published a war memoir entitled: Oorlogsvlieger van Oranje (War Pilot of Orange). In 1987 Van der Stok moved to Honolulu, where he continued in medical practice. He also worked with the U.S. Coast Guard Auxiliary, and took part in 162 rescues.

== Legacy ==
In the 1963 film The Great Escape, elements of his part in the affair were written into the role of "Sedgwick", played by the actor James Coburn.

In 2018, a brooch, awarded to him by the Caterpillar Club to acknowledge his use of an Irvin parachute to bail out of a stricken aircraft, sold for £3226 at auction, beating its estimate of £500-600.

In February 2019 a new edition of his memoir was published by Greenhill Books, London, with a preface by The Times journalist Simon Pearson and a foreword by Bram's son Robert Vanderstok.

== Honours ==
As a fighter pilot with the Netherlands air forces in May 1940, then as an RAF pilot and twice as a so-called "Engelandvaarder" (Lit: England sailor), Bram van der Stok was decorated multiple times by Dutch and foreign governments. Van der Stok is the only soldier to receive the four awards for gallantry and merit instituted during the Second World War, the Bronze Lion (15 June 1946), the Dutch Bronze Cross (awarded by Queen Wilhelmina for his actions on 5 October 1944), the Airman's Cross (with the number "2") (21 September 1942), and the Cross of Merit (3 September 1942). Belgium honored Bram van der Stok with the Officer's Cross with Palm of the Order of Leopold (24 March 1947). He also wore the Belgian (24 March 1947), French and Polish (9 May 1945) "Croix de Guerre" where the Belgian cross had a palm on the ribbon and three British stars for participating in the war on as many fronts. Shortly before his death, Bram van der Stok was awarded the Resistance Commemorative Cross . Furthermore, Bram van der Stok was an Officer in the Order of Orange-Nassau. The British King George VI made him (honorary) Member of the Order of the British Empire (19 November 1947).

Van der Stok received the following awards:
In the Netherlands:
Officer in the Order of Orange-Nassau with the swords (Note: Military receive the Order of Orange-Nassau "with the Swords", meaning that instead of a silver or golden laurel wreath a pair of crossed swords carried in the arms of the cross.)
Bronze Lion (Bronzen Leeuw)
Bronze Cross (Bronzen Kruis)
Cross of Merit (Kruis van Verdienste)
Airman's Cross (Vliegerkruis)
War Commemorative Cross (Oorlogsherinneringskruis) with 2 clasps
Resistance Commemorative Cross (Verzetsherdenkingskruis)
Officers' Cross (Onderscheidingsteken voor Langdurige Dienst als officier) with year sign XV
formal:Cross for the Four Day Marches (Kruis voor betoonde marsvaardigheid) informal: 4 Days Cross (Vierdaagse Kruis)

Outside the Netherlands:
Member of the Order of the British Empire (Military Division) (UK)
1939-1945 Star with 3 campaign stars (UK)
France and Germany Star (UK)
War Medal 1939-1945 (UK)
Officer in the Order of Leopold II with palm (Officier in de order van Leopold II met palm/Officier de l'Ordre de Léopold II avec palme (Belgium)
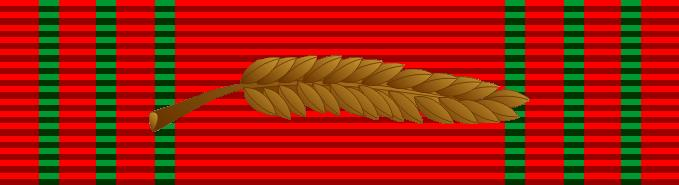
Croix de guerre 1940–1945 with palm/ (Oorlogskruis 1940-1945 met palm/Croix de Guerre 1940-1945 avec palme) (Belgium)
Croix de Guerre 1939-1945 (France)
Cross of Valour 1944 (Krzyż Walecznych 1944 ) (Poland)

C-130 Hercules with serial number "G-781" of the Royal Netherlands Air Force is named after him.

== Publications ==
- van der Stok, Bram (1980). Oorlogsvlieger van Oranje. Haarlem: De Haan. ISBN 978-90-228-3550-0.
- van der Stok, Bram (1987). War Pilot of Orange: Dutch Fighter Pilot World War II. Missoula: Pictorial Histories Publishing. ISBN 978-0-933126-89-3.
- Vanderstok, Bob (2019). Escape from Stalag Luft III: The True Story of My Successful Great Escape. London: Greenhill Books. ISBN 978-1-784384340.
