= Per Bergsland =

Norwegian orienteer

- Born: 17 January 1918; Norway
- Died: 9 June 1992 (aged 74)
- Military career
- Allegiance: Norway
- Rank: Sergeant
- Nickname: Peter Rockland
- Unit: No. 332 Squadron RAF (332 Sqn)
- Commands: Spitfire VB AB269 AH:D

Sgt Per Bergsland (17 January 1918 – 9 June 1992) was a Norwegian fighter pilot and POW in the German POW camp Stalag Luft III and one of only three men to escape to freedom in the "Great Escape".

== Sports career ==
During the 1930s Bergsland competed in orienteering, representing the club IL Heming. In 1939 he placed second at the individual Norwegian championship in orienteering held at Modum. He was born in Bærum, but resided at Ullernåsen, Oslo.

== World War II ==
Per Bergsland received training as a pilot in Canada. He transferred to the RAF in 1942, where he was assigned to fly with a combat unit. As a member of No. 332 Squadron RAF stationed at North Weald airfield, Bergsland's Supermarine Spitfire Mk.Vb, (serial no AB269, coded AH:D) was shot down by a German Focke-Wulf Fw 190 during the Dieppe Raid on 19 August 1942. After arriving at the POW camp, he gave his name as "Peter Rockland" (Per = Petrus, meaning rock in Greek, and Berg meaning mountain or rock in Norwegian), in order to protect his family in Norway from German persecution.

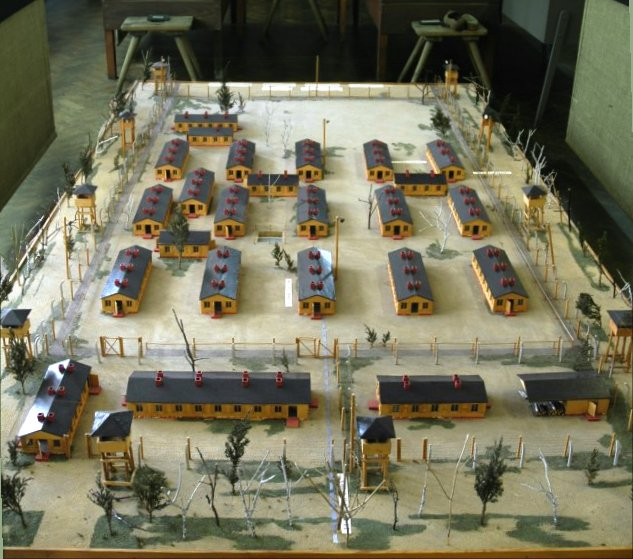
Stalag Luft III mockup.

In what later became known as the "Great Escape", he was escapee #43 among the 76 prisoners of war who managed to escape from the camp via tunnel with another Norwegian pilot, escapee #44 Jens Müller,

"Bergsland was wearing a civilian suit he had made for himself from a Royal Marine uniform, with an RAF overcoat slightly altered with brown leather sewn over the buttons. A black RAF tie, no hat. He carried a small suitcase which had been sent from Norway. In it were Norwegian toothpaste and soap, sandwiches, and 163 reichsmarks given to him by the Escape Committee. We caught the 2:04 train to Frankfurt an der Oder. Our papers stated that we were Norwegian electricians from the Arbeitslager [labor camp] in Frankfurt working in the vicinity of Sagan. For the journey from Frankfurt to Stettin we had other papers ordering us to change our place of work from Frankfurt to Stettin, and to report to the Birgermeister of Stettin."

Bergsland and Müller made it to the nearby town of Sagan, where they caught a train to Stettin in Germany (now: Szczecin, Poland). At the port, the pair were snuck onto a neutral Swedish ship by friendly sailors and made it to the safety of Gothenburg. There, they entered the British consulate, who arranged travel by train to Stockholm, where they were flown to Scotland from the Bromma airport. From there they were sent by train to London and shortly afterwards to 'Little Norway' in Canada.

In total, only three POWs from Stalag Luft III made it to neutral countries and freedom.

The third escapee was the Dutchman Bram van der Stok, who crossed most of occupied Europe and escaped to Spain with the help of the French resistance.

The remaining 73 escapees were captured. Adolf Hitler wanted to execute them all, but Hermann Göring persuaded him not to: in the end, fifty were shot as an example. The remaining 23 were held in the custody of the Gestapo before being sent off to other camps. 17 were returned to Stalag Luft III, four were sent to Sachsenhausen, and two to Colditz Castle.

== Postwar career ==
In 1946, Per Bergsland began as a pilot in Fred Olsen Air Transport. He later became Chief Pilot and Operational Manager. He became CEO of Fred Olsen Air Transport in 1968 and CEO of regional airline Widerøe from 1970 to 1981.

== See also ==
- The Great Escape
- Tre kom tilbake
- History of Widerøe

== Related reading ==
- Carroll, Tim (2004) The Great Escaper (Mainstream Publishing) ISBN 1-84018-904-5
- Brickhill, Paul (1950) The Great Escape (W. W. Norton & Company) ISBN 978-0-393-32579-9
- Burgess, Alan (1990) The Longest Tunnel (Bloomsbury Publishing) ISBN 0-7475-0589-6
- Durand, Arthur A (1989) Stalag Luft III (Patrick Stephens Ltd) ISBN 1-85260-248-1
