= Tre kom tilbake =

Published by Gyldendal Norsk Forlag

Tre kom tilbake (English: Three Returned) is an autobiographical book from 1946 written by Norwegian pilot Jens Müller on his war experiences during World War II. The book centers particularly on his participation in the 1944 mass escape from the German prisoner-of-war camp Stalag Luft III. An English-language translation was published in 2019.

== Summary ==
Müller served in the No. 331 Squadron RAF, when he was shot down over the sea during a flight mission on 19 June 1942. He was captured and brought a prisoner-of-war camp, Durchgangslager Frankfurt, and after interrogations eventually transferred to the camp Stammlager Luft III. As a prisoner in the camp, Müller participated in the escape plans, by helping with the ventilation of the tunnels dug by the prisoners.

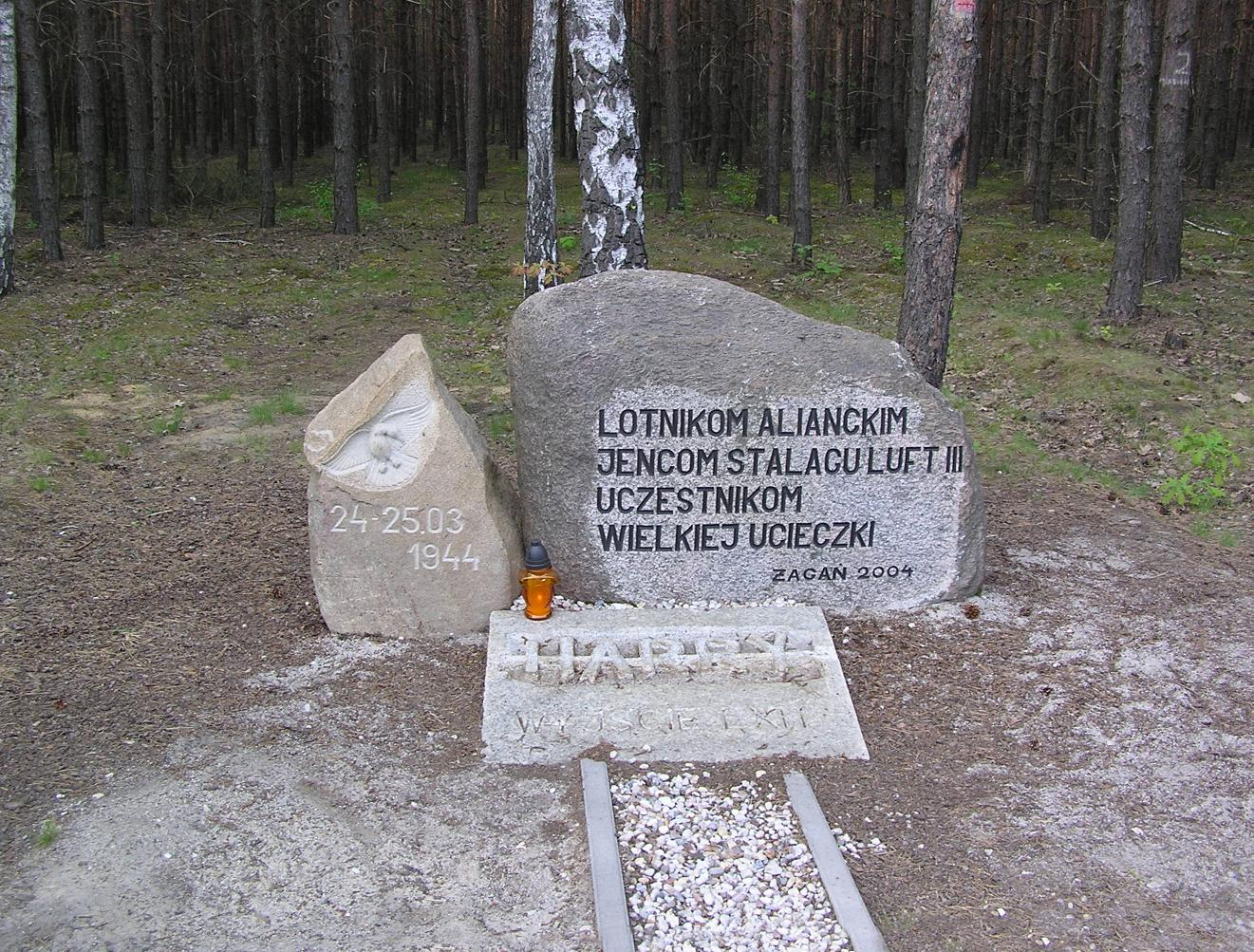
Location of the opening of the tunnel Harry.

In 1943 the prisoners were moved to a new camp site, and shortly thereafter they secretly organized the digging of three new tunnels, called Tom, Dick and Harry. On 24 March 1944 a number of prisoners made their way out of the camp through the tunnel Harry. Along with fellow prisoner Per Bergsland from RAF 332 Squadron, Müller eventually managed to escape to Sweden, after travelling by train to Frankfurt, taking a connecting train to Küstrin, then another train to Stettin. During the travel they were camouflaged as Norwegian electricians working in Germany, equipped with false documents made by other prisoners, including travel orders to change their workplace from Frankfurt to Stettin. They finally reached Sweden by hiding on a ship. After about ten days in Stockholm they were transported to Scotland in two Mosquito aeroplanes (each Mosquito could only carry one passenger), and arrived in London on 8 April 1944.

Only three of the seventy-six runaways from Stalag Luft III managed to escape to freedom, while the other 73 were caught after a giant man-hunt, and fifty men were executed by shooting as reprisal. Müller and Bergsland had no contact with the other escapees after they left the tunnel opening, and did not know the fate of the escapees until they were on their way to Canada to work as flight instructors. The 1946 book lists the number of escapees as 82, the number of caught as 79, and the number of shot as 54, numbers that have been corrected after later investigations.

== Other books on the escape incident from Stalag Luft III ==
- Brickhill, Paul (1950). The Great Escape. Adapted into the 1963 film The Great Escape, where plot details are largely fictional, not adhering to the facts from the actual escape.
- Burgess, Alan (1990). The Longest Tunnel. ISBN 9780671731960.
