= Jens Müller (pilot) =

Norwegian pilot (1917–1999)

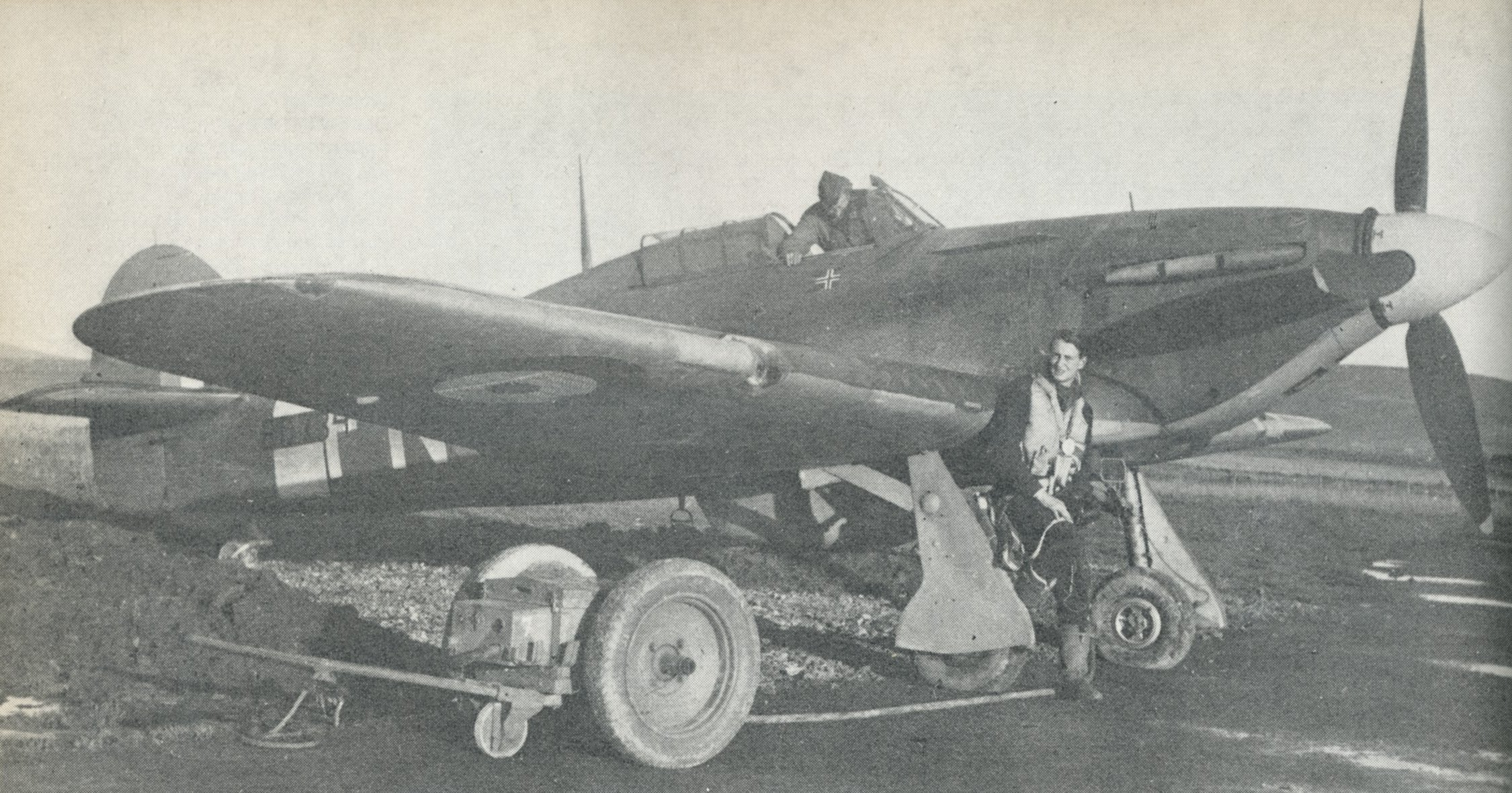
Müller with a 331 Squadron Hawker Hurricane at RAF Skeabrae in Orkney in 1941

Jens Einar Müller (30 November 1917 – 30 March 1999) was a Norwegian pilot trained in Little Norway in Canada and a prisoner of war in the German POW camp Stalag Luft III. He was one of only three men to escape to freedom in the "Great Escape".

== Early life ==
Müller was born in Shanghai, China on the 30th of November 1917, the son of Norwegian engineer Einar Jønsberg Müller (1872–1943) and British actress Daisy Constance Russell (1891–1978). Jens Müller had one brother, the Norwegian movie director Nils R. Müller. The brothers grew up in Aker, Norway. Müller had already received a pilot's license at age eighteen in 1935. Müller was studying in Zürich when World War II broke out. In May 1940 he arrived in England.

== Career ==
By 1942 he was an officer in 331 (Norwegian) Squadron at North Weald in England. On 19 June 1942, after completing a so-called "Roadsted" mission, his Spitfire Mark V (tail number AR298) was shot down by a German Focke-Wulf Fw 190 just off the Belgian coast after running out of ammunition. He escaped the plane by parachute and managed to paddle ashore unseen in his inflatable dinghy after 66 hours. However, he was caught by a German sentry almost immediately.

In what later became known as the "Great Escape" in March 1944, which Müller had contributed to by constructing an air pump for ventilation of the tunnel, he was escapee #43 among the 76 prisoners of war who managed to escape from the camp (now in Żagań, Poland). Müller partnered with a fellow Norwegian pilot, Per Bergsland, for their escape attempt.

"It took me three minutes to get through the tunnel. Above ground I crawled along holding the rope for several feet: it was tied to a tree. Sergeant Bergsland joined me; we arranged our clothes and walked to the Sagan railway station.

Bergsland was wearing a civilian suit he had made for himself from a Royal Marine uniform, with an RAF overcoat slightly altered with brown leather sewn over the buttons. A black RAF tie, no hat. He carried a small suitcase which had been sent from Norway. In it were Norwegian toothpaste and soap, sandwiches, and 163 reichsmarks given to him by the Escape Committee.

We caught the 2:04 train to Frankfurt an der Oder. Our papers stated that we were Norwegian electricians from the Arbeitslager [labor camp] in Frankfurt working in the vicinity of Sagan. For the journey from Frankfurt to Stettin we had other papers ordering us to change our place of work from Frankfurt to Stettin, and to report to the Bürgermeister of Stettin."

The pair caught a train to Stettin in Germany (now Szczecin, Poland), where they intended to meet one of Roger Bushell's contacts in a local brothel. However, while there, they made contact with a Swede who offered to aid their escape, telling them to wait down at a pier in the harbour. After some time they realized the ship had left. They spent half the night in a boxcar, slept the next at an inn, and on returning to the harbour the next evening, met two Swedish sailors who helped smuggle them past the harbour authorities.

The ship arrived in Gothenburg, where the two Norwegian pilots quickly sought out the British consulate. They were sent by train to Stockholm and were flown to Scotland from Bromma airport. From there they were sent by train to London and shortly afterwards to 'Little Norway' in Canada where they both resumed service, this time as flight instructors.

Out of the 76 POWs who escaped, only three managed to reach neutral countries and freedom. The third successful escapee was the Dutchman Bram van der Stok, who crossed most of occupied Europe and escaped to Spain with the help of the French resistance.

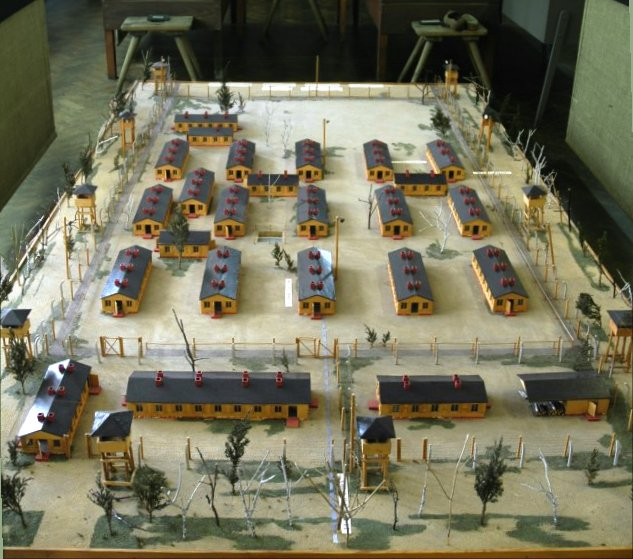
Stalag Luft III mockup

The remaining 73 escapees were recaptured. Adolf Hitler wanted to have them all shot, but Heinrich Himmler (or possibly Hermann Göring) persuaded him not to do this. Instead, 50 of the escapees were executed to make an example. This was a serious breach of the Geneva Convention which constituted a war crime. The remaining 23 recaptured prisoners were held in the custody of the Gestapo before being sent off to other camps. Of these, 17 were returned to Stalag Luft III, four were sent to Sachsenhausen, and two to Colditz Castle.

After the war, Müller worked for Det Norske Luftfartsselskap (DNL), one of the companies that merged into Scandinavian Airlines System. He retired in 1977.

He was married and resided in Rykkinn. He died in April 1999.

== Legacy ==
Jens Müller wrote a book about his war time experiences titled Tre kom tilbake (English: Three Returned) (Gyldendal, 1946). The Great Escape was made into a film. In February 2019 the first English language edition of Müller's memoir was published in English with an introduction by the Norwegian historian Asgeir Ueland and a preface by Jens Müller's son Jon Muller.

== Related reading ==
- Carroll, Tim (2004) The Great Escaper (Mainstream Publishing) ISBN 1-84018-904-5
- Brickhill, Paul (1950) The Great Escape (W. W. Norton & Company) ISBN 978-0-393-32579-9
- Burgess, Alan (1990) The Longest Tunnel (Bloomsbury Publishing) ISBN 0-7475-0589-6
- Durand, Arthur A (1989) Stalag Luft III (Patrick Stephens Ltd) ISBN 1-85260-248-1
- Muller, Jens (2019) Escape from Stalag Luft III: The Memoir of Jens Muller (Greenhill Books) ISBN 978-178438430-2
- Nerdrum, Johan (1986) Fugl fønix: En beretning om Det Norske Luftfartselskap (Gyldendal) ISBN 82-05-16663-3
