= Tyinholmen =

Coordinates: 61.35°N 8.23°E

Tyinholmen is an area on the north of the mountain lake Tyin in Jotunheimen in Vang Municipality in Innlandet, Norway. At the lake is a resort that has been in operation since 1892.

Winter season: 20 March – 3 May

Summer season: 22 June – 4 October
