= List of the busiest airports in the Nordic countries =

This is a list of the 100 busiest airports in the Nordic countries by passengers per year, aircraft movements per year and freight and mail tonnes per year.

The list also includes yearly statistics for the busiest metropolitan airport systems and the busiest air-routes for 2012.

This transport-related list is intended to be regularly updated as new statistics become available from the relevant official authorities.

== Nordic countries ==
Political map of the Nordic countries and associated territories

The Nordic countries make up a region in Northern Europe and the North Atlantic which consists of Denmark, Finland, Iceland, Norway, and Sweden and their associated territories which include the Faroe Islands, Greenland, Svalbard, and Åland. "Scandinavia" is sometimes used as a synonym for the Nordic countries, although within the Nordic countries the terms are considered distinct, especially since Scandinavia is by definition made up of the countries Denmark, Norway and Sweden.

The region's five sovereign states and three autonomous regions share much common history as well as common traits in their respective societies, such as political systems and the Nordic model.

Politically, Nordic countries do not form a separate entity, but they co-operate in the Nordic Council. Linguistically, the area is heterogeneous, with three unrelated language groups, the North Germanic branch of Indo-European languages and the Finnic and Sami branches of Uralic languages as well as the Eskimo–Aleut language Greenlandic spoken in Greenland.

The Nordic countries have a combined population of approximately 27 million spread over a land area of 3.5 million km^{2} (Greenland accounts for 60% of the total area).

== Passengers ==
=== 2025 statistics ===
Data from some airports are not available. For these, rounded values from 2023 are shown. Airports in Greenland are excluded due to lack of data from several years.

Rank	Country	Airport	City/town/village	Code (IATA/ICAO)	Total passengers	Rank change	Change 2024–2025
1	Denmark	Copenhagen Airport	Copenhagen	CPH/EKCH	32,432,770	Steady	▲8.5%
2	Norway	Oslo Airport, Gardermoen	Oslo	OSL/ENGM	27,072,860	Steady	▲2.4%
3	Sweden	Stockholm Arlanda Airport	Stockholm	ARN/ESSA	24,318,991	Steady	▲6.9%
4	Finland	Helsinki Airport	Helsinki	HEL/EFHK	16,980,287	Steady	▲4.1%
5	Iceland	Keflavík International Airport	Keflavík/Reykjavík	KEF/BIKF	8,159,461	Steady	▼2.0%
6	Norway	Bergen Airport, Flesland	Bergen	BGO/ENBR	6,704,306	Steady	▲2.3%
7	Sweden	Göteborg Landvetter Airport	Gothenburg	GOT/ESGG	5,439,751	Steady	▲1.9%
8	Norway	Trondheim Airport, Værnes	Trondheim	TRD/ENVA	4,174,172	Steady	▲1.6%
9	Norway	Stavanger Airport	Stavanger	SVG/ENZV	3,978,666	Steady	▲0.2%
10	Denmark	Billund Airport	Billund	BLL/EKBI	3,035,073	Steady	▼22.4%
11	Norway	Tromsø Airport	Tromsø	TOS/ENTC	2,973,266	Steady	▲10.9%
12	Norway	Bodø Airport	Bodø	BOO/ENBO	2,006,386	▲1	▲7.7%
13	Norway	Sandefjord Airport, Torp	Oslo/Sandefjord	TRF/ENTO	1,802,558	▼1	▼3.9%
14	Denmark	Aalborg Airport	Aalborg	AAL/EKYT	1,482,859	Steady	▲3.3%
15	Finland	Rovaniemi Airport	Rovaniemi	RVN/EFRO	1,120,022	▲3	▲18.1%
16	Sweden	Luleå Airport	Luleå	LLA/ESPA	1,104,972	▲1	▲12.7%
17	Norway	Ålesund Airport	Ålesund	AES/ENAL	1,013,280	▼1	▲0.2%
18	Norway	Harstad/Narvik Airport, Evenes	Harstad/Narvik	EVE/ENEV	922,812	▲2	▲10.0%
19	Sweden	Malmö Airport	Malmö	MMX/ESMS	856,272	Steady	▼5.5%
20	Norway	Kristiansand Airport, Kjevik	Kristiansand S.	KRS/ENCN	821,289	▲1	▲2.9%
21	Sweden	Umeå Airport	Umeå	UME/ESNU	721,329	▲1	▲6.8%
22	Norway	Haugesund Airport	Haugesund	HAU/ENHD	575,972	▲1	▼3.4%
23	Finland	Oulu Airport	Oulu	OUL/EFOU	545,034	▲1	▼6.0%
24	Denmark	Aarhus Airport	Aarhus	AAR/EKAH	525,798	▲1	▲2.9%
25	Faroe Islands	Vágar Airport	Vágar/Faroe Islands	FAE/EKVG	461,054	▲1	▲3.8%
26	Finland	Kittilä Airport	Kittilä	KTT/EFKT	445,766	▲1	▲8.1%
27	Norway	Alta Airport	Alta	ALF/ENAT	382,321	▲2	▲4.9%
28	Norway	Kristiansund Airport, Kvernberget	Kristiansund N.	KSU/ENKB	366,834	▲5	▲12.3%
29	Sweden	Stockholm Skavsta Airport	Nyköping/Stockholm	NYO/ESKN	341,332	▼1	▼6.4%
30	Norway	Molde Airport	Molde	MOL/ENML	335,737	▲1	▼3.2%
31	Iceland	Reykjavík Airport	Reykjavík	RKV/BIRK	334,042	▼1	▼5.8%
32	Norway	Kirkenes Airport	Kirkenes	KKN/ENKR	328,364	▲2	▲11.2%
33	Sweden	Skellefteå Airport	Skellefteå	SFT/ESNS	312,322	▼1	▼7.4%
34	Finland	Turku Airport	Turku	TKU/EFTU	278,503	▲2	▲9.2%
35	Sweden	Visby Airport	Visby	VBY/ESSV	262,040	Steady	▼10.9%
36	Sweden	Kiruna Airport	Kiruna	KRN/ESNQ	251,461	▲3	▲13.3%
37	Finland	Ivalo Airport	Ivalo	IVL/EFIV	249,056	Steady	▼0.1%
38	Sweden	Åre Östersund Airport	Åre/Östersund	OSD/ESNZ	246,637	Steady	▲2.9%
39	Iceland	Akureyri Airport	Akureyri	AEY/BIAR	216,268	▲3	▲12.7%
40	Norway	Svalbard Airport, Longyear	Longyearbyen	LYR/ENSB	200,401	▲3	▲8.9%
41	Norway	Bardufoss Airport	Bardufoss	BDU/ENDU	199,535	▼1	▼3.5%
42	Norway	Hammerfest Airport	Hammerfest	HFT/ENHF	191,203	▲5	▲27.2%
43	Finland	Vaasa Airport	Vaasa	VAA/EFVA	169,431	▲1	▼4.6%
44	Sweden	Ängelholm Helsingborg Airport	Ängelholm/Helsingborg	AGH/ESTA	167,936	▼3	▼16.7%
45	Norway	Leknes Airport	Leknes	LKN/ENLK	164,150	▲5	▲23.0%
46	Norway	Ørsta-Volda Airport	Ørsta/Volda	HOV/ENOV	160,135	▲2	▲13.5%
47	Denmark	Bornholm Airport	Rønne	RNN/EKRN	149,425	▼1	▼4.8%
48	Norway	Brønnøysund Airport	Brønnøysund	BNN/ENBN	144,832	▲5	▲13.4%
49	Finland	Kuopio Airport	Kuopio	KUO/EFKU	144,119	▲2	▲9.0%
50	Finland	Tampere-Pirkkala Airport	Tampere	TMP/EFTP	140,664	▼5	▼13.0%
51	Norway	Florø Airport	Florø	FRO/ENFL	131,398	▼2	▼6.8%
52	Finland	Kuusamo Airport	Kuusamo	KAO/EFKS	129,373	▲2	▲2.4%
53	Norway	Stokmarknes Airport	Stokmarknes	SKN/ENSK	126,986	▲3	▲10.1%
54	Norway	Svolvær Airport	Svolvær	SVJ/ENSH	118,993	▲4	▲15.2%
55	Sweden	Linköping City Airport	Linköping	LPI/ESSL	115,891	▼3	▼9.4%
56	Norway	Mo i Rana Airport, Røssvoll	Mo i Rana	MQN/ENRA	112,417	▲4	▲20.1%
57	Sweden	Växjö/Kronoberg Airport	Växjö/Alvesta	VXO/ESMX	110,982	▼2	▼11.6%
58	Sweden	Ronneby Airport	Ronneby/Karlskrona	RNB/ESDF	97,123	▲1	▼4.2%
59	Iceland	Egilsstaðir Airport	Egilsstaðir	EGS/BIEG	92,741	▲2	▼0.1%
60	Norway	Sandnessjøen Airport	Sandnessjøen	SSJ/ENST	90,814	▲7	▲18.8%
61	Norway	Sogndal Airport	Sogndal	SOG/ENSG	88,923	▲1	▼1.7%
62	Sweden	Kalmar Airport	Kalmar	KLR/ESMQ	88,180	▲1	▼1.3%
63	Sweden	Stockholm-Västerås Airport	Västerås/Stockholm	VST/ESOW	87,925	▲3	▲11.8%
64	Norway	Førde Airport	Førde	FDE/ENBL	82,922	▲4	▲10.5%
65	Norway	Vadsø Airport	Vadsø	VDS/ENVD	80,540	▼1	▲2.0%
66	Norway	Andøya Airport	Andenes	ANX/ENAN	79,193	▲6	▲19.7%
67	Norway	Mosjøen Airport	Mosjøen	MJF/ENMS	74,639	▲4	▲11.4%
68	Norway	Lakselv Airport	Lakselv	LKL/ENNA	74,377	▲2	▲6.3%
69	Sweden	Halmstad Airport	Halmstad	HAD/ESMT	71,649	▼12	▼31.5%
70	Denmark	Sønderborg Airport	Sønderborg	SGD/EKSB	64,510	▲6	▲11.2%
71	Sweden	Arvidsjaur Airport	Arvidsjaur	AJR/ESNX	61,529	▲2	▼1.2%
72	Sweden	Sundsvall Airport	Sundsvall/Härnösand	SDL/ESNN	56,817	▲3	▼3.3%
73	Denmark	Esbjerg Airport	Esbjerg	EBJ/EKEB	53,571	▼8	▼32.0%
74	Norway	Stord Airport	Leirvik	SRP/ENSO	52,661	▲9	▲44.8%
75	Norway	Sandane Airport	Sandane	SDN/ENSD	49,922	▲2	▲5.8%
76	Sweden	Örebro Airport	Örebro	ORB/ESOE	48,648	▼7	▼32.9%
77	Norway	Rørvik Airport	Rørvik	RVK/ENRM	43,626	▲1	▼1.2%
78	Finland	Kajaani Airport	Kajaani	KAJ/EFKI	43,116	▲2	▲8.4%
79	Åland	Mariehamn Airport	Mariehamn	MHQ/EFMA	42,062	▲2	▲6.3%
80	Finland	Enontekiö Airport	Enontekiö	ENF/EFET	41,977	▲2	
81	Finland	Joensuu Airport	Joensuu	JOE/EFJO	41,302	▼2	▲3.4%
82	Sweden	Norrköping Airport	Norrköping	NRK/ESSP	38,233	▼8	▼37.0%
83	Finland	Kemi-Tornio Airport	Kemi/Tornio	KEM/EFKE	34,624	▲2	▲5.4%
84	Sweden	Gällivare Airport	Gällivare	GEV/ESNG	33,167	Steady	▼6.8%
85	Norway	Namsos Airport	Namsos	OSY/ENNM	32,270	▲5	▲15.0%
86	Finland	Kokkola-Pietarsaari Airport	Kokkola/Jakobstad	KOK/EFKK	32,131	Steady	▲4.4%
87	Iceland	Ísafjörður Airport	Ísafjörður	IFJ/BIIS	30,000 (rounded value from 2023)		
88	Sweden	Karlstad Airport	Karlstad	KSD/ESOK	29,170	▲4	▲9.8%
89	Finland	Jyväskylä Airport	Jyväskylä	JYV/EFJY	28,321	▲4	▲9.9%
90	Sweden	Örnsköldsvik Airport	Örnsköldsvik	OER/ESNO	26,809	▼3	▼12.6%
91	Sweden	Sälen Trysil Airport	Sälen/Trysil	SCR/ESKS	26,495	▲4	▲14.8%
92	Norway	Vardø Airport	Vardø	VAW/ENSS	25,397	▲4	▲11.7%
93	Sweden	Stockholm Bromma Airport	Stockholm	BMA/ESSB	24,965	▼78	▼97.5%
94	Denmark	Roskilde Airport	Roskilde/Copenhagen	RKE/EKRK	21,489	Steady	▼9.1%
95	Finland	Lappeenranta Airport	Lappeenranta	LPP/EFLP	21,367	▼4	▼21.0%
96	Norway	Honningsvåg Airport	Honningsvåg	HVG/ENHV	19,613	▲4	▲8.7%
97	Norway	Båtsfjord Airport	Båtsfjord	BJF/ENBS	18,891	Steady	▼8.5%
98	Norway	Hasvik Airport	Hasvik	HAA/ENHK	18,555	▲new	▲7.0%
99	Norway	Røros Airport	Røros	RRS/ENRO	18,505	▼1	▲1.7%
100	Sweden	Lycksele Airport	Lycksele	LYC/ESNL	17,850	▼1	▼1.3%

=== 2024 statistics ===
Data from some airports are not available. For these values from 2023 are shown. Airports in Greenland are excluded due to lack of data from several years.

Rank	Country	Airport	City/town/village	Code (IATA/ICAO)	Total passengers	Rank change	Change 2023–2024
1	DEN	Copenhagen Airport, Kastrup	Copenhagen	CPH/EKCH	29,882,167	Steady	▲11.9%
2	NOR	Oslo Airport, Gardermoen	Oslo	OSL/ENGM	26,438,238	Steady	▲5.1%
3	SWE	Stockholm Arlanda Airport	Stockholm	ARN/ESSA	22,757,911	Steady	▲4.2%
4	FIN	Helsinki Airport	Helsinki	HEL/EFHK	16,308,814	Steady	▲6.5%
5	ISL	Keflavík International Airport	Keflavík/Reykjavík	KEF/BIKF	8,326,972	Steady	▲7.1%
6	NOR	Bergen Airport, Flesland	Bergen	BGO/ENBR	6,552,286	Steady	▲2.3%
7	SWE	Göteborg Landvetter Airport	Gothenburg	GOT/ESGG	5,335,783	Steady	▲2.8%
8	NOR	Trondheim Airport, Værnes	Trondheim	TRD/ENVA	4,108,450	Steady	▲2.0%
9	NOR	Stavanger Airport	Stavanger	SVG/ENZV	3,972,478	▲1	▲0.5%
10	DEN	Billund Airport	Billund	BLL/EKBI	3,911,804	▼1	▼2.1%
11	NOR	Tromsø Airport	Tromsø	TOS/ENTC	2,680,641	Steady	▲15.0%
12	NOR	Sandefjord Airport, Torp	Sandefjord	TRF/ENTO	1,875,090	Steady	▼2.4%
13	NOR	Bodø Airport	Bodø	BOO/ENBO	1,862,097	Steady	▲7.5%
14	DEN	Aalborg Airport	Aalborg	AAL/EKYT	1,435,945	Steady	▲1.8%
15	SWE	Stockholm Bromma Airport	Stockholm	BMA/ESSB	1,012,459	▲1	▼15.0%
16	NOR	Ålesund Airport	Ålesund	AES/ENAL	1,011,192	▲1	▼3.8%
17	SWE	Luleå Airport	Luleå	LLA/ESPA	980,333	▲1	▼5.4%
18	FIN	Rovaniemi Airport	Rovaniemi	RVN/EFRO	948,151	▲3	▲29.0%
19	SWE	Malmö Airport	Malmö	MMX/ESMS	905,702	▼4	▼30.2%
20	NOR	Harstad/Narvik Airport, Evenes	Harstad/Narvik	EVE/ENEV	838,720	Steady	▲3.7%
21	NOR	Kristiansand Airport, Kjevik	Kristiansand S.	KRS/ENCN	797,908	▼2	▼2.8%
22	SWE	Umeå Airport	Umeå	UME/ESNU	675,257	Steady	▼1.5%
23	NOR	Haugesund Airport	Haugesund	HAU/ENHD	596,022	▲1	▼4.1%
24	FIN	Oulu Airport	Oulu	OUL/EFOU	579,862	▲1	▲4.7%
25	DEN	Aarhus Airport	Aarhus	AAR/EKAH	511,061	▲1	▼6.0%
26	FRO	Vágar Airport	Vágar/Faroe Islands	FAE/EKVG	444,035	▲1	▲3.0%
27	FIN	Kittilä Airport	Kittilä	KTT/EFKT	412,304	▲2	▲10.1%
28	SWE	Stockholm Skavsta Airport	Nyköping/Stockholm	NYO/ESKN	364,603	▼5	▼46.8%
29	NOR	Alta Airport	Alta	ALF/ENAT	364,427	▲3	▲5.8%
30	ISL	Reykjavík Airport	Reykjavík	RKV/BIRK	354,616	Steady	▲0.0%
31	NOR	Molde Airport	Molde	MOL/ENML	346,786	▼3	▼12.5%
32	SWE	Skellefteå Airport	Skellefteå	SFT/ESNS	337,380	▼1	▼2.9%
33	NOR	Kristiansund Airport, Kvernberget	Kristiansund N.	KSU/ENKB	326,579	▲1	▲12.9%
34	NOR	Kirkenes Airport	Kirkenes	KKN/ENKR	295,409	▲1	▲5.2%
35	SWE	Visby Airport	Visby	VBY/ESSV	294,039	▼2	▼7.6%
36	FIN	Turku Airport	Turku	TKU/EFTU	255,014	▲1	▲9.4%
37	FIN	Ivalo Airport	Ivalo	IVL/EFIV	249,319	▲2	▲13.0%
38	SWE	Åre Östersund Airport	Åre/Östersund	OSD/ESNZ	239,737	▼2	▼5.4%
39	SWE	Kiruna Airport	Kiruna	KRN/ESNQ	221,858	▲1	▲2.1%
40	NOR	Bardufoss Airport	Bardufoss	BDU/ENDU	206,846	▲2	▲0.8%
41	SWE	Ängelholm Helsingborg Airport	Ängelholm/Helsingborg	AGH/ESTA	201,700	▼3	▼9.8%
42	ISL	Akureyri Airport	Akureyri	AEY/BIAR	191,841	▲2	▼0.3%
43	SJM	Svalbard Airport, Longyear	Longyearbyen	LYR/ENSB	184,030	▲2	▲9.8%
44	FIN	Vaasa Airport	Vaasa	VAA/EFVA	177,592	▲4	▲15.5%
45	FIN	Tampere-Pirkkala Airport	Tampere	TMP/EFTP	161,747	▼4	▼24.3%
46	DEN	Bornholm Airport	Rønne	RNN/EKRN	156,879	▼3	▼22.6%
47	NOR	Hammerfest Airport	Hammerfest	HFT/ENHF	150,364	▲3	▲13.5%
48	NOR	Ørsta-Volda Airport	Ørsta/Volda	HOV/ENOV	141,042	▲12	▲44.7%
49	NOR	Florø Airport	Florø	FRO/ENFL	140,953	▼2	▼10.2%
50	NOR	Leknes Airport	Leknes	LKN/ENLK	133,407	▲7	▲18.2%
51	FIN	Kuopio Airport	Kuopio	KUO/EFKU	132,264	▼2	▼9.9%
52	SWE	Linköping City Airport	Linköping	LPI/ESSL	127,874	▲1	▲7.9%
53	NOR	Brønnøysund Airport	Brønnøysund	BNN/ENBN	127,674	▼2	▲1.9%
54	FIN	Kuusamo Airport	Kuusamo	KAO/EFKS	126,313	▼2	▲4.8%
55	SWE	Växjö/Kronoberg Airport	Växjö/Alvesta	VXO/ESMX	125,615	▼9	▼24.9%
56	NOR	Stokmarknes Airport	Stokmarknes	SKN/ENSK	115,306	▼2	▲0.0%
57	SWE	Halmstad Airport	Halmstad	HAD/ESMT	104,627	▲8	▲24.8%
58	NOR	Svolvær Airport	Svolvær	SVJ/ENSH	103,282	▲4	▲9.2%
59	SWE	Ronneby Airport	Ronneby/Karlskrona	RNB/ESDF	101,388	▼1	▼8.4%
60	NOR	Mo i Rana Airport, Røssvoll	Mo i Rana	MQN/ENRA	93,605	▼5	▼17.6%
61	ISL	Egilsstaðir Airport	Egilsstaðir	EGS/BIEG	92,795	▲3	▼0.2%
62	NOR	Sogndal Airport	Sogndal	SOG/ENSG	90,444	▲1	▼3.0%
63	SWE	Kalmar Airport	Kalmar	KLR/ESMQ	89,321	▼7	▼21.3%
64	NOR	Vadsø Airport	Vadsø	VDS/ENVD	78,969	▼5	▼19.3%
65	DEN	Esbjerg Airport	Esbjerg	EBJ/EKEB	78,795	▼4	▼18.6%
66	SWE	Stockholm-Västerås Airport	Västerås/Stockholm	VST/ESOW	78,652	Steady	▼5.9%
67	NOR	Sandnessjøen Airport	Sandnessjøen	SSJ/ENST	76,457	▲1	▲4.7%
68	NOR	Førde Airport	Førde	FDE/ENBL	75,047	▲2	▲9.4%
69	SWE	Örebro Airport	Örebro	ORB/ESOE	72,455	▼2	▼10.2%
70	NOR	Lakselv Airport	Lakselv	LKL/ENNA	69,992	▲4	▲16.2%
71	NOR	Mosjøen Airport	Mosjøen	MJF/ENMS	67,000	▼2	▼5.9%
72	NOR	Andøya Airport	Andenes	ANX/ENAN	66,163	▼1	▲2.0%
73	SWE	Arvidsjaur Airport	Arvidsjaur	AJR/ESNX	62,259	▲2	▲12.5%
74	SWE	Norrköping Airport	Norrköping	NRK/ESSP	60,704	▼2	▼6.4%
75	SWE	Sundsvall Airport	Sundsvall/Härnösand	SDL/ESNN	58,786	▼2	▼5.6%
76	DEN	Sønderborg Airport	Sønderborg	SGD/EKSB	58,017	Steady	▲17.5%
77	NOR	Sandane Airport	Sandane	SDN/ENSD	47,177	Steady	▲4.0%
78	NOR	Rørvik Airport	Rørvik	RVK/ENRM	44,157	▲1	▲9.1%
79	FIN	Joensuu Airport	Joensuu	JOE/EFJO	39,956	▲1	▲3.2%
80	FIN	Kajaani Airport	Kajaani	KAJ/EFKI	39,761	▼2	▼1.9%
81	ALA	Mariehamn Airport	Mariehamn	MHQ/EFMA	39,569	Steady	▲5.5%
82	FIN	Enontekiö Airport	Enontekiö	ENF/EFET	38,327	▲new	
83	NOR	Stord Airport	Leirvik	SRP/ENSO	36,363	▲new	▲244.7%
84	SWE	Gällivare Airport	Gällivare	GEV/ESNG	35,569	▲7	▲32.3%
85	FIN	Kemi-Tornio Airport	Kemi/Tornio	KEM/EFKE	32,844	▼3	▼12.1%
86	FIN	Kokkola-Pietarsaari Airport	Kokkola/Jakobstad	KOK/EFKK	30,779	▼1	▲5.1%
87	SWE	Örnsköldsvik Airport	Örnsköldsvik	OER/ESNO	30,690	▲2	▲9.6%
88	ISL	Ísafjörður Airport	Ísafjörður	IFJ/BIIS	28,462	▼4	▼3.7%
89	SWE	Jönköping Airport	Jönköping	JKG/ESGJ	28,405	▲7	▲30.0%
90	NOR	Namsos Airport	Namsos	OSY/ENNM	28,067	Steady	▲3.9%
91	FIN	Lappeenranta Airport	Lappeenranta	LPP/EFLP	27,040	▼8	▼18.9%
92	SWE	Karlstad Airport	Karlstad	KSD/ESOK	26,562	▲5	▲29.8%
93	FIN	Jyväskylä Airport	Jyväskylä	JYV/EFJY	25,765	▲2	▲9.7%
94	DEN	Roskilde Airport	Roskilde/Copenhagen	RKE/EKRK	23,644	Steady	▼2.1%
95	SWE	Sälen Trysil Airport	Sälen/Trysil	SCR/ESKS	23,072	▲3	▲21.0%
96	NOR	Vardø Airport	Vardø	VAW/ENSS	22,731	▼9	▼22.0%
97	NOR	Båtsfjord Airport	Båtsfjord	BJF/ENBS	20,657	▼11	▼29.4%
98	NOR	Røros Airport	Røros	RRS/ENRO	18,190	▲2	▲2.4%
99	SWE	Lycksele Airport	Lycksele	LYC/ESNL	18,091	▲new	▲5.1%
100	NOR	Honningsvåg Airport	Honningsvåg	HVG/ENHV	18,049	▼7	▼26.3%

=== 2023 statistics ===
Rank	Country	Airport	City/town/village	Code (IATA/ICAO)	Total passengers	Rank change	Change 2022–2023
1	DEN	Copenhagen Airport, Kastrup	Copenhagen	CPH/EKCH	26,697,123	▲1	▲20.6%
2	NOR	Oslo Airport, Gardermoen	Oslo	OSL/ENGM	25,147,914	▼1	▲11.9%
3	SWE	Stockholm Arlanda Airport	Stockholm	ARN/ESSA	21,845,031	Steady	▲18.8%
4	FIN	Helsinki Airport	Helsinki	HEL/EFHK	15,313,355	Steady	▲18.9%
5	ISL	Keflavík International Airport	Keflavík/Reykjavík	KEF/BIKF	7,775,429	Steady	▲26.9%
6	NOR	Bergen Airport, Flesland	Bergen	BGO/ENBR	6,405,049	Steady	▲6.8%
7	SWE	Göteborg Landvetter Airport	Gothenburg	GOT/ESGG	5,192,054	Steady	▲16.8%
8	NOR	Trondheim Airport, Værnes	Trondheim	TRD/ENVA	4,028,062	Steady	▲5.9%
9	DEN	Billund Airport	Billund	BLL/EKBI	3,995,820	Steady	▲7.4%
10	NOR	Stavanger Airport	Stavanger	SVG/ENZV	3,952,233	Steady	▲10.5%
11	NOR	Tromsø Airport	Tromsø	TOS/ENTC	2,330,670	Steady	▲5.4%
12	NOR	Sandefjord Airport, Torp	Sandefjord	TRF/ENTO	1,921,014	Steady	▲10.2%
13	NOR	Bodø Airport	Bodø	BOO/ENBO	1,731,560	Steady	▲5.6%
14	DEN	Aalborg Airport	Aalborg	AAL/EKYT	1,410,575	Steady	▲5.1%
15	SWE	Malmö Airport	Malmö	MMX/ESMS	1,297,141	Steady	▲0.5%
16	SWE	Stockholm Bromma Airport	Stockholm	BMA/ESSB	1,190,507	Steady	▲6.4%
17	NOR	Ålesund Airport	Ålesund	AES/ENAL	1,050,771	Steady	▲13.8%
18	SWE	Luleå Airport	Luleå	LLA/ESPA	1,035,925	Steady	▲13.6%
19	NOR	Kristiansand Airport, Kjevik	Kristiansand S.	KRS/ENCN	820,751	▲1	▲10.9%
20	NOR	Harstad/Narvik Airport, Evenes	Harstad/Narvik	EVE/ENEV	808,655	▼1	▲1.8%
21	FIN	Rovaniemi Airport	Rovaniemi	RVN/EFRO	735,078	▲2	▲31.1%
22	SWE	Umeå Airport	Umeå	UME/ESNU	685,885	Steady	▲12.7%
23	SWE	Stockholm Skavsta Airport	Nyköping/Stockholm	NYO/ESKN	685,269	▲1	▲23.3%
24	NOR	Haugesund Airport	Haugesund	HAU/ENHD	621,302	▲1	▲21.8%
25	FIN	Oulu Airport	Oulu	OUL/EFOU	554,096	▼4	▼12.3%
26	DEN	Aarhus Airport	Aarhus	AAR/EKAH	543,819	Steady	▲29.0%
27	FRO	Vágar Airport	Vágar/Faroe Islands	FAE/EKVG	431,229	Steady	▲6.1%
28	NOR	Molde Airport	Molde	MOL/ENML	396,394	Steady	▲12.6%
29	FIN	Kittilä Airport	Kittilä	KTT/EFKT	374,626	▲1	▲11.1%
30	ISL	Reykjavík Airport	Reykjavík	RKV/BIRK	354,769	▼1	▲1.7%
31	SWE	Skellefteå Airport	Skellefteå	SFT/ESNS	347,351	▲3	▲30.0%
32	NOR	Alta Airport	Alta	ALF/ENAT	344,396	▼1	▲4.6%
33	SWE	Visby Airport	Visby	VBY/ESSV	318,064	▼1	▲7.9%
34	NOR	Kristiansund Airport, Kvernberget	Kristiansund N.	KSU/ENKB	289,304	▼1	▲3.0%
35	NOR	Kirkenes Airport	Kirkenes	KKN/ENKR	280,896	Steady	▲13.7%
36	SWE	Åre Östersund Airport	Åre/Östersund	OSD/ESNZ	253,468	Steady	▲15.4%
37	FIN	Turku Airport	Turku	TKU/EFTU	233,043	▲11	▲75.0%
38	SWE	Ängelholm Helsingborg Airport	Ängelholm/Helsingborg	AGH/ESTA	223,653	▲3	▲16.6%
39	FIN	Ivalo Airport	Ivalo	IVL/EFIV	220,718	▼1	▲11.5%
40	SWE	Kiruna Airport	Kiruna	KRN/ESNQ	217,228	▼1	▲10.9%
41	FIN	Tampere-Pirkkala Airport	Tampere	TMP/EFTP	213,699	▲3	▲27.0%
42	NOR	Bardufoss Airport	Bardufoss	BDU/ENDU	205,213	Steady	▲14.1%
43	DEN	Bornholm Airport	Rønne	RNN/EKRN	202,575	▼6	▲1.6%
44	ISL	Akureyri Airport	Akureyri	AEY/BIAR	192,447	▼4	▼1.7%
45	SJM	Svalbard Airport, Longyear	Longyearbyen	LYR/ENSB	167,533	▼2	▼1.6%
46	SWE	Växjö/Kronoberg Airport	Växjö/Alvesta	VXO/ESMX	167,363	▲1	▲12.1%
47	NOR	Florø Airport	Florø	FRO/ENFL	156,984	▼1	▲4.4%
48	FIN	Vaasa Airport	Vaasa	VAA/EFVA	153,781	▲4	▲35.8%
49	FIN	Kuopio Airport	Kuopio	KUO/EFKU	146,847	▲1	▲16.5%
50	NOR	Hammerfest Airport	Hammerfest	HFT/ENHF	132,508	▼5	▼14.8%
51	NOR	Brønnøysund Airport	Brønnøysund	BNN/ENBN	125,286	▼2	▼2.1%
52	FIN	Kuusamo Airport	Kuusamo	KAO/EFKS	120,551	▼1	▲2.9%
53	SWE	Linköping City Airport	Linköping	LPI/ESSL	118,542	▲11	▲46.8%
54	NOR	Stokmarknes Airport	Stokmarknes	SKN/ENSK	115,301	▼1	▲3.7%
55	NOR	Mo i Rana Airport, Røssvoll	Mo i Rana	MQN/ENRA	113,577	▼1	▲3.1%
56	SWE	Kalmar Airport	Kalmar	KLR/ESMQ	113,488	▼1	▲6.9%
57	NOR	Leknes Airport	Leknes	LKN/ENLK	112,837	▼1	▲7.6%
58	SWE	Ronneby Airport	Ronneby/Karlskrona	RNB/ESDF	110,663	Steady	▲9.5%
59	NOR	Vadsø Airport	Vadsø	VDS/ENVD	97,803	Steady	▼2.8%
60	NOR	Ørsta-Volda Airport	Ørsta/Volda	HOV/ENOV	97,486	▼3	▼5.7%
61	DEN	Esbjerg Airport	Esbjerg	EBJ/EKEB	96,819	▲4	▲24.0%
62	NOR	Svolvær Airport	Svolvær	SVJ/ENSH	94,543	Steady	▲5.1%
63	NOR	Sogndal Airport	Sogndal	SOG/ENSG	93,254	Steady	▲4.8%
64	ISL	Egilsstaðir Airport	Egilsstaðir	EGS/BIEG	92,945	▼3	▲1.1%
65	SWE	Halmstad Airport	Halmstad	HAD/ESMT	83,818	▲1	▲9.5%
66	SWE	Stockholm-Västerås Airport	Västerås/Stockholm	VST/ESOW	83,587	▼6	▼10.2%
67	SWE	Örebro Airport	Örebro	ORB/ESOE	80,694	▲1	▲19.2%
68	NOR	Sandnessjøen Airport	Sandnessjøen	SSJ/ENST	73,026	▼1	▲5.1%
69	NOR	Mosjøen Airport	Mosjøen	MJF/ENMS	71,223	▲1	▲8.6%
70	NOR	Førde Airport	Førde	FDE/ENBL	68,618	▲1	▲7.2%
71	NOR	Andøya Airport	Andenes	ANX/ENAN	64,844	▼2	▼3.0%
72	SWE	Norrköping Airport	Norrköping	NRK/ESSP	64,829	▲6	▲61.3%
73	SWE	Sundsvall Airport	Sundsvall/Härnösand	SDL/ESNN	62,251	▲3	▲31.4%
74	NOR	Lakselv Airport	Lakselv	LKL/ENNA	60,227	▼2	▲1.0%
75	SWE	Arvidsjaur Airport	Arvidsjaur	AJR/ESNX	55,355	▼2	▲14.2%
76	DEN	Sønderborg Airport	Sønderborg	SGD/EKSB	49,357	▼1	▲4.0%
77	NOR	Sandane Airport	Sandane	SDN/ENSD	45,362	Steady	▲12.7%
78	FIN	Kajaani Airport	Kajaani	KAJ/EFKI	40,520	▲11	▲59.5%
79	NOR	Rørvik Airport	Rørvik	RVK/ENRM	40,478	▼5	▼15.7%
80	FIN	Joensuu Airport	Joensuu	JOE/EFJO	38,714	▲15	▲106.4%
81	ALA	Mariehamn Airport	Mariehamn	MHQ/EFMA	37,518	▲5	▲40.8%
82	FIN	Kemi-Tornio Airport	Kemi/Tornio	KEM/EFKE	37,351	▲9	▲66.0%
83	FIN	Lappeenranta Airport	Lappeenranta	LPP/EFLP	33,355	▼2	▼6.8%
84	ISL	Ísafjörður Airport	Ísafjörður	IFJ/BIIS	29,556	▼2	▼5.3%
85	FIN	Kokkola-Pietarsaari Airport	Kokkola/Jakobstad	KOK/EFKK	29,272	▲13	▲70.2%
86	NOR	Båtsfjord Airport	Båtsfjord	BJF/ENBS	29,249	▲2	▲14.2%
87	NOR	Vardø Airport	Vardø	VAW/ENSS	29,160	▼2	▲5.3%
88	NOR	Hasvik Airport	Hasvik	HAA/ENHK	28,450	▼4	▲0.2%
89	SWE	Örnsköldsvik Airport	Örnsköldsvik	OER/ESNO	28,003	▲new	▲168.8%
90	NOR	Namsos Airport	Namsos	OSY/ENNM	27,002	▼11	▼28.3%
91	SWE	Gällivare Airport	Gällivare	GEV/ESNG	26,888	▲2	▲27.7%
92	NOR	Mehamn Airport	Mehamn	MEH/ENMH	26,230	▼5	▲0.3%
93	NOR	Honningsvåg Airport	Honningsvåg	HVG/ENHV	24,498	▼3	▲3.2%
94	DEN	Roskilde Airport	Roskilde/Copenhagen	RKE/EKRK	24,152	▼11	▼18.6%
95	FIN	Jyväskylä Airport	Jyväskylä	JYV/EFJY	23,492	▲new	▲114.0%
96	SWE	Jönköping Airport	Jönköping	JKG/ESGJ	21,854	▲3	▲40.1%
97	SWE	Karlstad Airport	Karlstad	KSD/ESOK	20,463	▼3	▲3.1%
98	SWE	Sälen Trysil Airport	Sälen/Trysil	SCR/ESKS	19,064	▼1	▲6.1%
99	NOR	Sørkjosen Airport	Sørkjosen	SOJ/ENSR	19,005	▼3	▲1.4%
100	NOR	Røros Airport	Røros	RRS/ENRO	17,770	▲new	▲27.4%

Greenlandic airport data is not available. Airports likely to be among top 100 include:

- Kangerlussuaq Airport
- Nuuk Airport
- Ilulissat Airport
- Narsarsuaq Airport
- Sisimiut Airport

The ranking does not include these airports.

=== 2022 statistics ===
Rank	Country	Airport	City/town/village	Code (IATA/ICAO)	Total passengers	Rank change	Change 2021–2022
1	NOR	Oslo Airport, Gardermoen	Oslo	OSL/ENGM	22,467,510	Steady	▲139.1%
2	DEN	Copenhagen Airport	Copenhagen	CPH/EKCH	22,143,007	Steady	▲173.8%
3	SWE	Stockholm Arlanda Airport	Stockholm	ARN/ESSA	18,387,268	Steady	▲145.3%
4	FIN	Helsinki Airport	Helsinki	HEL/EFHK	12,882,861	Steady	▲202.3%
5	ISL	Keflavík International Airport	Keflavík/Reykjavík	KEF/BIKF	6,126,421	▲1	▲182.1%
6	NOR	Bergen Airport, Flesland	Bergen	BGO/ENBR	5,995,234	▼1	▲83.1%
7	SWE	Göteborg Landvetter Airport	Gothenburg	GOT/ESGG	4,447,037	▲1	▲132.7%
8	NOR	Trondheim Airport, Værnes	Trondheim	TRD/ENVA	3,803,933	▼1	▲84.5%
9	DEN	Billund Airport	Billund	BLL/EKBI	3,721,392	▲2	▲172.4%
10	NOR	Stavanger Airport	Stavanger	SVG/ENZV	3,576,772	▼1	▲97.0%
11	NOR	Tromsø Airport	Tromsø	TOS/ENTC	2,212,225	▼1	▲50.3%
12	NOR	Sandefjord Airport, Torp	Sandefjord	TRF/ENTO	1,743,132	▲2	▲149.4%
13	NOR	Bodø Airport	Bodø	BOO/ENBO	1,639,469	▼1	▲42.4%
14	DEN	Aalborg Airport	Aalborg	AAL/EKYT	1,342,384	▼1	▲75.6%
15	SWE	Malmö Airport	Malmö	MMX/ESMS	1,290,763	Steady	▲95.1%
16	SWE	Stockholm Bromma Airport	Stockholm	BMA/ESSB	1,119,102	▲1	▲97.2%
17	NOR	Ålesund Airport	Ålesund	AES/ENAL	923,734	▲2	▲84.9%
18	SWE	Luleå Airport	Luleå	LLA/ESPA	912,169	▲2	▲91.5%
19	NOR	Harstad/Narvik Airport, Evenes	Harstad/Narvik	EVE/ENEV	794,106	▼1	▲50.0%
20	NOR	Kristiansand Airport, Kjevik	Kristiansand S.	KRS/ENCN	739,907	▲1	▲86.7%
21	FIN	Oulu Airport	Oulu	OUL/EFOU	632,130	▲2	▲110.4%
22	SWE	Umeå Airport	Umeå	UME/ESNU	608,742	Steady	▲98.1%
23	FIN	Rovaniemi Airport	Rovaniemi	RVN/EFRO	560,734	▲3	▲119.9%
24	SWE	Stockholm Skavsta Airport	Nyköping/Stockholm	NYO/ESKN	555,622	▼8	▼9.4%
25	NOR	Haugesund Airport	Haugesund	HAU/ENHD	510,117	Steady	▲97.3%
26	DEN	Aarhus Airport	Aarhus	AAR/EKAH	421,649	▲11	▲213.3%
27	FRO	Vágar Airport	Vágar/Faroe Islands	FAE/EKVG	406,453	Steady	▲70.0%
28	NOR	Molde Airport	Molde	MOL/ENML	352,047	▲2	▲83.3%
29	ISL	Reykjavík Airport	Reykjavík	RKV/BIRK	348,773	▼5	▲17.5%
30	FIN	Kittilä Airport	Kittilä	KTT/EFKT	337,198	▲3	▲85.0%
31	NOR	Alta Airport	Alta	ALF/ENAT	329,203	▼3	▲38.0%
32	SWE	Visby Airport	Visby	VBY/ESSV	294,760	▼1	▲55.6%
33	NOR	Kristiansund Airport, Kvernberget	Kristiansund N.	KSU/ENKB	280,972	▼4	▲43.2%
34	SWE	Skellefteå Airport	Skellefteå	SFT/ESNS	267,262	▲4	▲108.3%
35	NOR	Kirkenes Airport	Kirkenes	KKN/ENKR	247,107	▼3	▲31.6%
36	SWE	Åre Östersund Airport	Åre/Östersund	OSD/ESNZ	219,595	▲4	▲75.1%
37	DEN	Bornholm Airport	Rønne	RNN/EKRN	199,456	▼3	▲17.0%
38	FIN	Ivalo Airport	Ivalo	IVL/EFIV	197,987	▲6	▲79.1%
39	SWE	Kiruna Airport	Kiruna	KRN/ESNQ	195,894	▲2	▲62.1%
40	ISL	Akureyri Airport	Akureyri	AEY/BIAR	195,763	▼4	▲40.1%
41	SWE	Ängelholm Helsingborg Airport	Ängelholm/Helsingborg	AGH/ESTA	191,815	▲1	▲61.1%
42	NOR	Bardufoss Airport	Bardufoss	BDU/ENDU	179,853	▼3	▲40.6%
43	SJM	Svalbard Airport, Longyear	Longyearbyen	LYR/ENSB	170,277	▲6	▲106.9%
44	FIN	Tampere-Pirkkala Airport	Tampere	TMP/EFTP	168,328	▲53	▲1906.1%
45	NOR	Hammerfest Airport	Hammerfest	HFT/ENHF	155,493	▼10	▲0.5%
46	NOR	Florø Airport	Florø	FRO/ENFL	150,339	▼3	▲26.4%
47	SWE	Växjö/Kronoberg Airport	Växjö/Alvesta	VXO/ESMX	149,269	▲15	▲233.0%
48	FIN	Turku Airport	Turku	TKU/EFTU	133,137	▲11	▲160.6%
49	NOR	Brønnøysund Airport	Brønnøysund	BNN/ENBN	128,032	▼4	▲27.5%
50	FIN	Kuopio Airport	Kuopio	KUO/EFKU	126,083	▲18	▲246.3%
51	FIN	Kuusamo Airport	Kuusamo	KAO/EFKS	117,104	▲1	▲57.8%
52	FIN	Vaasa Airport	Vaasa	VAA/EFVA	113,244	▲30	▲488.9%
53	NOR	Stokmarknes Airport	Stokmarknes	SKN/ENSK	111,177	▼6	▲33.2%
54	NOR	Mo i Rana Airport, Røssvoll	Mo i Rana	MQN/ENRA	110,118	▼4	▲37.4%
55	SWE	Kalmar Airport	Kalmar	KLR/ESMQ	106,136	▲8	▲139.0%
56	NOR	Leknes Airport	Leknes	LKN/ENLK	104,890	▼8	▲27.1%
57	NOR	Ørsta-Volda Airport	Ørsta/Volda	HOV/ENOV	103,418	▼4	▲43.4%
58	SWE	Ronneby Airport	Ronneby/Karlskrona	RNB/ESDF	101,101	▲6	▲137.5%
59	NOR	Vadsø Airport	Vadsø	VDS/ENVD	100,645	▼13	▲15.8%
60	SWE	Stockholm-Västerås Airport	Västerås/Stockholm	VST/ESOW	93,080	▲1	▲102.6%
61	ISL	Egilsstaðir Airport	Egilsstaðir	EGS/BIEG	91,919	▼10	▲18.6%
62	NOR	Svolvær Airport	Svolvær	SVJ/ENSH	89,927	▼8	▲35.3%
63	NOR	Sogndal Airport	Sogndal	SOG/ENSG	88,961	▼8	▲43.3%
64	SWE	Linköping City Airport	Linköping	LPI/ESSL	80,735	▲13	▲231.2%
65	DEN	Esbjerg Airport	Esbjerg	EBJ/EKEB	78,069	Steady	▲85.8%
66	SWE	Halmstad Airport	Halmstad	HAD/ESMT	76,517	Steady	▲86.5%
67	NOR	Sandnessjøen Airport	Sandnessjøen	SSJ/ENST	69,455	▼10	▲21.8%
68	SWE	Örebro Airport	Örebro	ORB/ESOE	67,712	▲new	▲1314.2%
69	NOR	Andøya Airport	Andenes	ANX/ENAN	66,829	▼9	▲37.0%
70	NOR	Mosjøen Airport	Mosjøen	MJF/ENMS	65,569	▼14	▲12.6%
71	NOR	Førde Airport	Førde	FDE/ENBL	64,026	▼4	▲59.7%
72	NOR	Lakselv Airport	Lakselv	LKL/ENNA	59,646	▼14	▲9.9%
73	SWE	Arvidsjaur Airport	Arvidsjaur	AJR/ESNX	48,470	▲2	▲95.0%
74	NOR	Rørvik Airport	Rørvik	RVK/ENRM	48,039	▼5	▲42.3%
75	DEN	Sønderborg Airport	Sønderborg	SGD/EKSB	47,467	▲4	▲106.0%
76	SWE	Sundsvall Airport	Sundsvall/Härnösand	SDL/ESNN	47,367	▲15	▲312.9%
77	NOR	Sandane Airport	Sandane	SDN/ENSD	40,240	▼5	▲51.1%
78	SWE	Norrköping Airport	Norrköping	NRK/ESSP	40,186	▲21	▲430.4%
79	NOR	Namsos Airport	Namsos	OSY/ENNM	37,656	▼9	▲25.9%
80	DEN	Midtjyllands Airport	Karup/Herning	KRP/EKKA	35,804	▲6	▲107.0%
81	FIN	Lappeenranta Airport	Lappeenranta	LPP/EFLP	35,796	▲8	▲160.9%
82	ISL	Ísafjörður Airport	Ísafjörður	IFJ/BIIS	31,223	▼9	▲19.8%
83	DEN	Roskilde Airport	Roskilde/Copenhagen	RKE/EKRK	29,671	▼3	▲33.0%
84	NOR	Hasvik Airport	Hasvik	HAA/ENHK	28,393	▼8	▲15.0%
85	NOR	Vardø Airport	Vardø	VAW/ENSS	27,683	▼11	▲11.3%
86	ALA	Mariehamn Airport	Mariehamn	MHQ/EFMA	26,639	▼3	▲46.0%
87	NOR	Mehamn Airport	Mehamn	MEH/ENMH	26,154	▼9	▲13.5%
88	NOR	Båtsfjord Airport	Båtsfjord	BJF/ENBS	25,620	▼17	▼3.9%
89	FIN	Kajaani Airport	Kajaani	KAJ/EFKI	25,400	▼4	▲44.3%
90	NOR	Honningsvåg Airport	Honningsvåg	HVG/ENHV	23,728	▼9	▲15.0%
91	FIN	Kemi-Tornio Airport	Kemi/Tornio	KEM/EFKE	22,501	▼3	▲34.4%
92	NOR	Stord Airport	Leirvik	SRP/ENSO	21,616	▼5	▲25.1%
93	SWE	Gällivare Airport	Gällivare	GEV/ESNG	21,062	▼1	▲84.5%
94	SWE	Karlstad Airport	Karlstad	KSD/ESOK	19,840	▲new	▲418.0%
95	FIN	Joensuu Airport	Joensuu	JOE/EFJO	18,755	▼1	▲106.3%
96	NOR	Sørkjosen Airport	Sørkjosen	SOJ/ENSR	18,745	▼12	▲4.5%
97	SWE	Sälen Trysil Airport	Sälen/Trysil	SCR/ESKS	17,961	▲new	▲483.0%
98	FIN	Kokkola-Pietarsaari Airport	Kokkola/Jakobstad	KOK/EFKK	17,198	▲new	▲170.5%
99	SWE	Jönköping Airport	Jönköping	JKG/ESGJ	15,604	▲new	▲266.5%
100	SWE	Kristianstad Airport	Kristianstad	KID/ESMK	15,116	▲new	▲11438.9%

Airports for which figures are not available but are likely to be among top 100 include:

- Kangerlussuaq Airport
- Nuuk Airport
- Ilulissat Airport
- Narsarsuaq Airport
- Sisimiut Airport

The ranking does not include these airports. Greenland airport administration publishes a figure of 182,807 for Kangerlussuaq and Narsarsuaq together, and 193,623 for all other airports together except heliports.

=== 2021 statistics ===
Rank	Country	Airport	City/town/village	Code (IATA/ICAO)	Total passengers	Rank change	Change 2020–2021
1	NOR	Oslo Airport, Gardermoen	Oslo	OSL/ENGM	9,397,864	Steady	▲4.2%
2	DEN	Copenhagen Airport	Copenhagen	CPH/EKCH	8,087,604	Steady	▲7.5%
3	SWE	Stockholm Arlanda Airport	Stockholm	ARN/ESSA	7,494,783	Steady	▲14.7%
4	FIN	Helsinki Airport	Helsinki	HEL/EFHK	4,261,530	Steady	▼15.7%
5	NOR	Bergen Airport Flesland	Bergen	BGO/ENBR	3,273,615	Steady	▲20.7%
6	ISL	Keflavík International Airport	Keflavík/Reykjavík	KEF/BIKF	2,171,996	▲3	▲58.1%
7	NOR	Trondheim Airport Værnes	Trondheim	TRD/ENVA	2,062,297	▼1	▲14.4%
8	SWE	Göteborg Landvetter Airport	Gothenburg	GOT/ESGG	1,911,195	Steady	▲21.2%
9	NOR	Stavanger Airport Sola	Stavanger	SVG/ENZV	1,815,419	▼2	▲8.4%
10	NOR	Tromsø Airport	Tromsø	TOS/ENTC	1,471,488	Steady	▲15.8%
11	DEN	Billund Airport	Billund	BLL/EKBI	1,365,929	▲1	▲46.1%
12	NOR	Bodø Airport	Bodø	BOO/ENBO	1,151,135	▼1	▲16.9%
13	DEN	Aalborg Airport	Aalborg	AAL/EKYT	764,560	▲3	▲48.8%
14	NOR	Sandefjord Torp Airport	Sandefjord	TRF/ENTO	699,033	▼1	▲7.5%
15	SWE	Malmö Airport	Malmö	MMX/ESMS	661,656	Steady	▲25.7%
16	SWE	Stockholm Skavsta Airport	Nyköping/Stockholm	NYO/ESKN	613,030	▼2	▲6.9%
17	SWE	Stockholm Bromma Airport	Stockholm	BMA/ESSB	567,607	Steady	▲18.4%
18	NOR	Harstad/Narvik Airport Evenes	Harstad/Narvik	EVE/ENEV	529,248	▲2	▲33.4%
19	NOR	Ålesund Airport Vigra	Ålesund	AES/ENAL	499,468	▼1	▲10.4%
20	SWE	Luleå Airport	Luleå	LLA/ESPA	476,333	▼1	▲13.4%
21	NOR	Kristiansand Airport Kjevik	Kristiansand S.	KRS/ENCN	396,254	Steady	▲3.0%
22	SWE	Umeå Airport	Umeå	UME/ESNU	307,322	▲1	▲5.0%
23	FIN	Oulu Airport	Oulu	OUL/EFOU	300,390	▼1	▼4.0%
24	ISL	Reykjavík Airport	Reykjavík	RKV/BIRK	296,812	▲7	▲80.2%
25	NOR	Haugesund Airport Karmøy	Haugesund	HAU/ENHD	258,589	Steady	▲8.9%
26	FIN	Rovaniemi Airport	Rovaniemi	RVN/EFRO	254,979	▼2	▼4.9%
27	FRO	Vágar Airport	Vágar/Faroe Islands	FAE/EKVG	239,085	▲3	▲33.0%
28	NOR	Alta Airport	Alta	ALF/ENAT	238,570	Steady	▲22.7%
29	NOR	Kristiansund Airport Kvernberget	Kristiansund N.	KSU/ENKB	196,241	▼3	▼6.0%
30	NOR	Molde Airport Årø	Molde	MOL/ENML	192,078	▼1	▲4.3%
31	SWE	Visby Airport	Visby	VBY/ESSV	189,487	▲5	▲54.4%
32	NOR	Kirkenes Airport Høybuktmoen	Kirkenes	KKN/ENKR	187,808	Steady	▲14.7%
33	FIN	Kittilä Airport	Kittilä	KTT/EFKT	182,302	▼6	▼11.6%
34	DEN	Bornholm Airport	Rønne	RNN/EKRN	170,528	Steady	▲26.0%
35	NOR	Hammerfest Airport	Hammerfest	HFT/ENHF	154,795	▲7	▲40.3%
36	ISL	Akureyri International Airport	Akureyri	AEY/BIAR	139,754	▲11	▲72.6%
37	DEN	Aarhus Airport	Aarhus	AAR/EKAH	134,569	Steady	▲12.1%
38	SWE	Skellefteå Airport	Skellefteå	SFT/ESNS	128,315	▲6	▲35.5%
39	NOR	Bardufoss Airport	Bardufoss	BDU/ENDU	127,897	▼4	▼4.6%
40	SWE	Åre Östersund Airport	Åre/Östersund	OSD/ESNZ	125,442	▼7	▼10.8%
41	SWE	Kiruna Airport	Kiruna	KRN/ESNQ	120,818	Steady	▲9.4%
42	SWE	Ängelholm Helsingborg Airport	Ängelholm/Helsingborg	AGH/ESTA	119,093	▲1	▲8.1%
43	NOR	Florø Airport	Florø	FRO/ENFL	118,937	▼4	▲4.3%
44	FIN	Ivalo Airport	Ivalo	IVL/EFIV	110,520	▼6	▼3.8%
45	NOR	Brønnøysund Airport Brønnøy	Brønnøysund	BNN/ENBN	100,409	Steady	▲7.5%
46	NOR	Vadsø Airport	Vadsø	VDS/ENVD	86,914	▲2	▲19.5%
47	NOR	Stokmarknes Airport Skagen	Stokmarknes	SKN/ENSK	83,485	▲9	▲51.7%
48	NOR	Leknes Airport	Leknes	LKN/ENLK	82,495	▼2	▼4.1%
49	SJM	Svalbard Airport Longyear	Longyearbyen	LYR/ENSB	82,297	▲1	▲20.5%
50	NOR	Mo i Rana Airport Røssvoll	Mo i Rana	MQN/ENRA	80,121	▲4	▲39.3%
51	ISL	Egilsstaðir International Airport	Egilsstaðir	EGS/BIEG	77,506	▲11	▲61.9%
52	FIN	Kuusamo Airport	Kuusamo	KAO/EFKS	74,209	▼3	▲4.6%
53	NOR	Ørsta-Volda Airport Hovden	Ørsta/Volda	HOV/ENOV	72,121	▼1	▲23.6%
54	NOR	Svolvær Airport Helle	Svolvær	SVJ/ENSH	66,474	▲6	▲31.1%
55	NOR	Sogndal Airport Haukåsen	Sogndal	SOG/ENSG	62,099	Steady	▲11.8%
56	NOR	Mosjøen Airport Kjærstad	Mosjøen	MJF/ENMS	58,219	▲11	▲36.7%
57	NOR	Sandnessjøen Airport Stokka	Sandnessjøen	SSJ/ENST	57,046	▲1	▲11.8%
58	NOR	Lakselv Airport Banak	Lakselv	LKL/ENNA	54,287	▲7	▲19.7%
59	FIN	Turku Airport	Turku	TKU/EFTU	51,086	▼19	▼54.6%
60	NOR	Andøya Airport Andenes	Andenes	ANX/ENAN	48,792	▲4	▲5.2%
61	SWE	Stockholm-Västerås Airport	Västerås/Stockholm	VST/ESOW	45,953	▲8	▲24.3%
62	SWE	Växjö/Kronoberg Airport	Växjö/Alvesta	VXO/ESMX	44,821	▼1	▼10.8%
63	SWE	Kalmar Airport	Kalmar	KLR/ESMQ	44,416	▼6	▼16.0%
64	SWE	Ronneby Airport	Ronneby/Karlskrona	RNB/ESDF	42,574	▼5	▼16.3%
65	DEN	Esbjerg Airport	Esbjerg	EBJ/EKEB	42,027	▼2	▼9.5%
66	SWE	Halmstad Airport	Halmstad	HAD/ESMT	41,031	▲7	▲29.9%
67	NOR	Førde Airport Bringeland	Førde	FDE/ENBL	40,095	▲4	▲17.7%
68	FIN	Kuopio Airport	Kuopio	KUO/EFKU	36,407	▼15	▼36.8%
69	NOR	Rørvik Airport Ryum	Rørvik	RVK/ENRM	33,770	▲5	▲15.5%
70	NOR	Namsos Airport	Namsos	OSY/ENNM	29,917	▲7	▲30.0%
71	NOR	Båtsfjord Airport	Båtsfjord	BJF/ENBS	26,659	▲12	▲34.3%
72	NOR	Sandane Airport Anda	Sandane	SDN/ENSD	26,638	▲9	▲25.6%
73	ISL	Ísafjörður Airport	Skutulsfjörður	IFJ/BIIS	26.066	▲20	▲43.6%
74	NOR	Vardø Airport Svartnes	Vardø	VAW/ENSS	24,869	▲14	▲43.7%
75	SWE	Arvidsjaur Airport	Arvidsjaur	AJR/ESNX	24,860	▼7	▼37.9%
76	NOR	Hasvik Airport	Hasvik	HAA/ENHK	24,697	▲6	▲22.2%
77	SWE	Linköping City Airport	Linköping	LPI/ESSL	24,378	▼5	▼27.3%
78	NOR	Mehamn Airport	Mehamn	MEH/ENMH	23,044	▲8	▲32.4%
79	DEN	Sønderborg Airport	Sønderborg	SGD/EKSB	23,042	▼1	+4.3%
80	DEN	Roskilde Airport	Roskilde/Copenhagen	RKE/EKRK	22,316	▲4	▲20.3%
81	NOR	Honningsvåg Airport	Honningsvåg	HVG/ENHV	20,630	▲9	▲30.9%
82	FIN	Vaasa Airport	Vaasa	VAA/EFVA	19,231	▼31	▼67.8%
83	ALA	Mariehamn Airport	Mariehamn	MHQ/EFMA	18,247	▼7	▼23.9%
84	NOR	Sørkjosen Airport	Sørkjosen	SOJ/ENSR	17,940	▲11	▲32.0%
85	FIN	Kajaani Airport	Kajaani	KAJ/EFKI	17,600	▲2	▲1.3%
86	DEN	Midtjyllands Airport	Karup/Herning	KRP/EKKA	17,294	▼11	▼40.7%
87	NOR	Stord Airport Sørstokken	Leirvik	SRP/ENSO	17,279	▲2	▲7.2%
88	FIN	Kemi-Tornio Airport	Kemi/Tornio	KEM/EFKE	16,738	▲6	▲22.5%
89	FIN	Lappeenranta Airport	Lappeenranta	LPP/EFLP	13,720	▼9	▼36.9%
90	NOR	Berlevåg Airport	Berlevåg	BVG/ENBV	12,336	▲new	▲31.4%
91	SWE	Sundsvall Airport	Sundsvall/Härnösand	SDL/ESNN	11,472	▼25	▼73.2%
92	SWE	Gällivare Airport	Gällivare	GEV/ESNG	11,413	▲new	▲30.5%
93	NOR	Røst Airport	Røst	RET/ENRS	9,912	▲7	▲2.8%
94	FIN	Joensuu Airport	Joensuu	JOE/EFJO	9,090	▼15	▼58.6%
95	ISL	Hornafjörður Airport	Hornafjörður	HFN/BIHN	8,586	▲new	▲31.6%
96	SWE	Hemavan Airport	Hemavan/Tärnaby	HMV/ESUT	8,496	▲new	▲52.2%
97	FIN	Tampere-Pirkkala Airport	Tampere	TMP/EFTP	8,391	▼26	▼76.7%
98	SWE	Lycksele Airport	Lycksele	LYC/ESNL	7,655	▲new	▲17.2%
99	SWE	Norrköping Airport	Norrköping	NRK/ESSP	7,576	▼13	▼57.7%
100	NOR	Værøy Heliport	Værøy	VRY/ENVY	7,231	▲new	▲15.6%

Airports for which figures are not available but are likely to be among top 100 include:

- Kangerlussuaq Airport
- Nuuk Airport
- Ilulissat Airport

The ranking does not include these airports. Greenland airport administration publishes a figure of 110,118 for Kangerlussuaq and Narsarsuaq together, and 146,000 for all other airports together except heliports.

=== 2020 statistics ===
Rank	Country	Airport	City/town/village	Code (IATA/ICAO)	Total passengers	Rank change	Change 2019–2020
1	NOR	Oslo Airport, Gardermoen	Oslo	OSL/ENGM	9,021,729	▲1	−68.4%
2	DEN	Copenhagen Airport	Copenhagen	CPH/EKCH	7,525,441	▼1	−75.1%
3	SWE	Stockholm Arlanda Airport	Stockholm	ARN/ESSA	6,535,776	Steady	−74.5%
4	FIN	Helsinki Airport	Helsinki	HEL/EFHK	5,053,134	Steady	−76.9%
5	NOR	Bergen Airport Flesland	Bergen	BGO/ENBR	2,711,276	▲2	−58.3%
6	NOR	Trondheim Airport Værnes	Trondheim	TRD/ENVA	1,802,826	▲2	−58.9%
7	NOR	Stavanger Airport Sola	Stavanger	SVG/ENZV	1,674,900	▲2	−61.1%
8	SWE	Göteborg Landvetter Airport	Gothenburg	GOT/ESGG	1,576,787	▼2	−76.4%
9	ISL	Keflavík International Airport	Keflavík/Reykjavík	KEF/BIKF	1,373,971	▼4	−81.0%
10	NOR	Tromsø Airport	Tromsø	TOS/ENTC	1,270,337	▲1	−46.4%
11	NOR	Bodø Airport	Bodø	BOO/ENBO	985,014	▲5	−47.4%
12	DEN	Billund Airport	Billund	BLL/EKBI	934,706	▼2	−75.0%
13	NOR	Sandefjord Torp Airport	Sandefjord	TRF/ENTO	650,376	▲1	−68.6%
14	SWE	Stockholm Skavsta Airport	Nyköping/Stockholm	NYO/ESKN	573,229	▼1	−75.0%
15	SWE	Malmö Airport	Malmö	MMX/ESMS	526,514	Steady	−73.4%
16	DEN	Aalborg Airport	Aalborg	AAL/EKYT	513,852	▲1	−64.5%
17	SWE	Stockholm Bromma Airport	Stockholm	BMA/ESSB	479,400	▼5	−79.6%
18	NOR	Ålesund Airport Vigra	Ålesund	AES/ENAL	452,242	▲1	−60.6%
19	SWE	Luleå Airport	Luleå	LLA/ESPA	420,231	▼1	−63.8%
20	NOR	Harstad/Narvik Airport Evenes	Harstad/Narvik	EVE/ENEV	396,716	▲3	−48.3%
21	NOR	Kristiansand Airport Kjevik	Kristiansand S.	KRS/ENCN	384,599	▼1	−63.9%
22	FIN	Oulu Airport	Oulu	OUL/EFOU	312,892	▼1	−70.4%
23	SWE	Umeå Airport	Umeå	UME/ESNU	292,731	▼1	−69.5%
24	FIN	Rovaniemi Airport	Rovaniemi	RVN/EFRO	268,122	Steady	−59.4%
25	NOR	Haugesund Airport Karmøy	Haugesund	HAU/ENHD	237,459	Steady	−59.3%
26	NOR	Kristiansund Airport Kvernberget	Kristiansund N.	KSU/ENKB	208,830	▲10	−35.9%
27	FIN	Kittilä Airport	Kittilä	KTT/EFKT	206,251	▲7	−43.2%
28	NOR	Alta Airport	Alta	ALF/ENAT	194,458	▲5	−47.9%
29	NOR	Molde Airport Årø	Molde	MOL/ENML	184,210	▲1	−57.3%
30	FRO	Vágar Airport	Vágar/Faroe Islands	FAE/EKVG	179,778	▲1	−57.6%
31	ISL	Reykjavík Airport	Reykjavík	RKV/BIRK	164,716	▲4	−53.1%
32	NOR	Kirkenes Airport Høybuktmoen	Kirkenes	KKN/ENKR	163,718	▲5	−48.2%
33	SWE	Åre Östersund Airport	Åre/Östersund	OSD/ESNZ	140,586	▼6	−70.3%
34	DEN	Bornholm Airport	Rønne	RNN/EKRN	135,369	▲11	−42.7%
35	NOR	Bardufoss Airport	Bardufoss	BDU/ENDU	134,040	▲7	−45.6%
36	SWE	Visby Airport	Visby	VBY/ESSV	122,744	▼7	−72.5%
37	DEN	Aarhus Airport	Aarhus	AAR/EKAH	120,063	▼11	−76.0%
38	FIN	Ivalo Airport	Ivalo	IVL/EFIV	114,922	▲6	−52.1%
39	NOR	Florø Airport	Florø	FRO/ENFL	114,076	▲13	−26.6%
40	FIN	Turku Airport	Turku	TKU/EFTU	112,585	▼12	−75.1%
41	SWE	Kiruna Airport	Kiruna	KRN/ESNQ	110,456	Steady	−58.8%
42	NOR	Hammerfest Airport	Hammerfest	HFT/ENHF	110,339	▲11	−25.8%
43	SWE	Ängelholm Helsingborg Airport	Ängelholm/Helsingborg	AGH/ESTA	110,142	▼11	−71.5%
44	SWE	Skellefteå Airport	Skellefteå	SFT/ESNS	94,699	▼5	−67.0%
45	NOR	Brønnøysund Airport Brønnøy	Brønnøysund	BNN/ENBN	93,424	▲10	−28.8%
46	NOR	Leknes Airport	Leknes	LKN/ENLK	86,038	▲10	−34.4%
47	ISL	Akureyri International Airport	Akureyri	AEY/BIAR	80,951	▲4	−56.1%
48	NOR	Vadsø Airport	Vadsø	VDS/ENVD	72,750	▲18	−28.0%
49	FIN	Kuusamo Airport	Kuusamo	KAO/EFKS	70,943	▲11	−37.8%
50	SJM	Svalbard Airport Longyear	Longyearbyen	LYR/ENSB	68,271	Steady	−63.2%
51	FIN	Vaasa Airport	Vaasa	VAA/EFVA	59,712	▼13	−80.4%
52	NOR	Ørsta-Volda Airport Hovden	Ørsta/Volda	HOV/ENOV	58,337	▲10	−46.5%
53	FIN	Kuopio Airport	Kuopio	KUO/EFKU	57,599	▼10	−76.3%
54	NOR	Mo i Rana Airport Røssvoll	Mo i Rana	MQN/ENRA	57,524	▲9	−45.9%
55	NOR	Sogndal Airport Haukåsen	Sogndal	SOG/ENSG	55,526	▲19	−32.0%
56	NOR	Stokmarknes Airport Skagen	Stokmarknes	SKN/ENSK	55,017	▲9	−46.6%
57	SWE	Kalmar Airport	Kalmar	KLR/ESMQ	52,868	▼11	−77.2%
58	NOR	Sandnessjøen Airport Stokka	Sandnessjøen	SSJ/ENST	51,028	▲19	−30.5%
59	SWE	Ronneby Airport	Ronneby/Karlskrona	RNB/ESDF	50,864	▼10	−75.1%
60	NOR	Svolvær Airport Helle	Svolvær	SVJ/ENSH	50,721	▲7	−46.3%
61	SWE	Växjö/Kronoberg Airport	Växjö/Alvesta	VXO/ESMX	50,273	▼21	−81.9%
62	ISL	Egilsstaðir International Airport	Egilsstaðir	EGS/BIEG	47,876	▲8	−43.0%
63	DEN	Esbjerg Airport	Esbjerg	EBJ/EKEB	46,442	▲8	−44.6%
64	NOR	Andøya Airport Andenes	Andenes	ANX/ENAN	46,390	▲21	−16.1%
65	NOR	Lakselv Airport Banak	Lakselv	LKL/ENNA	45,348	▲18	−22.8%
66	SWE	Sundsvall Airport	Sundsvall/Härnösand	SDL/ESNN	42,800	▼19	−81.5%
67	NOR	Mosjøen Airport Kjærstad	Mosjøen	MJF/ENMS	42,593	▲11	−38.3%
68	SWE	Arvidsjaur Airport	Arvidsjaur	AJR/ESNX	40,030	▲14	−31.9%
69	SWE	Stockholm-Västerås Airport	Västerås/Stockholm	VST/ESOW	36,968	▼8	−66.1%
70	FIN	Tampere-Pirkkala Airport	Tampere	TMP/EFTP	35,950	▼22	−83.8%
71	NOR	Førde Airport Bringeland	Førde	FDE/ENBL	34,078	▲1	−59.1%
72	SWE	Linköping City Airport	Linköping	LPI/ESSL	33,525	▼18	−76.8%
73	SWE	Halmstad Airport	Halmstad	HAD/ESMT	31,584	▼15	−74.6%
74	NOR	Rørvik Airport Ryum	Rørvik	RVK/ENRM	29,248	▲15	−31.3%
75	DEN	Karup Airport	Karup	KRP/EKKA	29,188	▼16	−74.4%
76	ALA	Mariehamn Airport	Mariehamn	MHQ/EFMA	23,962	▲11	−53.6%
77	NOR	Namsos Airport	Namsos	OSY/ENNM	23,016	▲11	−47.7%
78	DEN	Sønderborg Airport	Sønderborg	SGD/EKSB	22,084	▼2	−70.1%
79	FIN	Joensuu Airport	Joensuu	JOE/EFJO	21,939	▼22	−82.7%
80	FIN	Lappeenranta Airport	Lappeenranta	LPP/EFLP	21,757	▼6	−73.2%
81	NOR	Sandane Airport Anda	Sandane	SDN/ENSD	21,206	▲9	−48.7%
82	NOR	Hasvik Airport	Hasvik	HAA/ENHK	20,210	▲16	−24.0%
83	NOR	Båtsfjord Airport	Båtsfjord	BJF/ENBS	19,847	▲16	−25.0%
84	DEN	Roskilde Airport	Roskilde/Copenhagen	RKE/EKRK	18,554	▲new	▲5.5%
85	SWE	Norrköping Airport	Norrköping	NRK/ESSP	17,899	▼21	−82.7%
86	NOR	Mehamn Airport	Mehamn	MEH/ENMH	17,408	▲new	−25.2%
87	FIN	Kajaani Airport	Kajaani	KAJ/EFKI	17,379	▼19	−80.1%
88	NOR	Vardø Airport Svartnes	Vardø	VAW/ENSS	17,309	▲7	−41.8%
89	NOR	Stord Airport Sørstokken	Leirvik	SRP/ENSO	16,124	▲4	−56.1%
90	NOR	Honningsvåg Airport	Honningsvåg	HVG/ENHV	15,758	▲new	−39.8%
91	NOR	Røros Airport	Røros	RRS/ENRO	15,532	▲9	−40.8%
92	SWE	Örnsköldsvik Airport	Örnsköldsvik	OER/ESNO	14,976	▼23	−82.5%
93	ISL	Ísafjörður Airport	Skutulsfjörður	IFJ/BIIS	14,708	▲1	−54.0%
94	SWE	Sälen Trysil Airport	Sälen/Trysil	SCR/ESKS	14,157	▲new	▲1731%
95	FIN	Kemi-Tornio Airport	Kemi/Tornio	KEM/EFKE	13,661	▼13	−78.5%
96	NOR	Sørkjosen Airport	Sørkjosen	SOJ/ENSR	13,590	▲new	−35.8%
97	SWE	Örebro Airport	Örebro	ORB/ESOE	13,114	▼21	−83.0%
98	SWE	Jönköping Airport	Jönköping	JKG/ESGJ	12,172	▼18	−81.7%
99	SWE	Karlstad Airport	Karlstad	KSD/ESOK	10,900	▼12	−79.0%
100	FIN	Jyväskylä Airport	Jyväskylä	JYV/EFJY	10,590	▼19	−84.1%
101	NOR	Røst Airport	Røst	RET/ENRS	9,645	▲new	−33.9%

Airports for which figures are not available but are likely to be among top 100 include:

- Kangerlussuaq Airport
- Nuuk Airport
- Ilulissat Airport
- Narsarsuaq Airport

The ranking does not include these airports. Greenland airport administration publishes a figure of 87,672 for Kangerlussuaq and Narsarsuaq together, and 124,762 for all other airports together.

=== 2020 COVID-19 statistics ===
For the purpose of documenting the large decline in air travel during the COVID-19 pandemic, figures for April 2020 are compared with April 2019 (for the 50 busiest airports).

Country	Airport	City/town/village	Passengers April 2019	Passengers April 2020	Change April 2019–2020
DEN	Copenhagen Airport	Copenhagen	2,508,962	25,936	▼99.0%
NOR	Oslo Airport, Gardermoen	Oslo	2,252,054	120,530	▼94.6%
SWE	Stockholm Arlanda Airport	Stockholm	2,037,770	46,026	▼97.7%
FIN	Helsinki Airport	Helsinki	1,798,851	21,000	▼98.8%
SWE	Göteborg Landvetter Airport	Gothenburg	552,535	2,823	▼99.5%
NOR	Bergen Airport Flesland	Bergen	502,636	75,207	▼85.0%
ISL	Keflavík International Airport	Keflavík/Reykjavík	474,519	3,132	▼99.3%
NOR	Trondheim Airport Værnes	Trondheim	333,667	35,257	▼89.4%
NOR	Stavanger Airport Sola	Stavanger	332,726	43,699	▼86.9%
DEN	Billund Airport	Billund	314,629	3,018	▼99.0%
SWE	Stockholm Skavsta Airport	Nyköping/Stockholm	219,737	2,054	▼99.1%
SWE	Stockholm Bromma Airport	Stockholm	213,554	725	▼99.7%
NOR	Sandefjord Torp Airport	Sandefjord	178,419	No info	
NOR	Tromsø Airport	Tromsø	167,937	25,756	▼84.7%
SWE	Malmö Airport	Malmö	163,038	2,282	▼98.6%
NOR	Bodø Airport	Bodø	137,751	18,833	▼86.3%
DEN	Aalborg Airport	Aalborg	115,038	1,116	▼99.0%
NOR	Ålesund Airport Vigra	Ålesund	90,625	9,069	▼90.0%
FIN	Oulu Airport	Oulu	86,825	1,196	▼98.6%
SWE	Luleå Airport	Luleå	86,444	5,406	▼93.7%
NOR	Kristiansand Airport Kjevik	Kristiansand S.	84,837	7,832	▼90.8%
SWE	Umeå Airport	Umeå	78,666	2,610	▼96.7%
NOR	Harstad/Narvik Airport Evenes	Harstad/Narvik	57,950	7,428	▼87.2%
NOR	Haugesund Airport Karmøy	Haugesund	49,096	No info	
DEN	Aarhus Airport	Aarhus	40,528	0	▼100.0%
SWE	Åre Östersund Airport	Åre/Östersund	39,698	334	▼99.2%
FRO	Vágar Airport	Vágar/Faroe Islands	37,979	2,389	▼93.7%
FIN	Turku Airport	Turku	33,871	394	▼98.8%
FIN	Rovaniemi Airport	Rovaniemi	33,546	1,257	▼96.3%
SWE	Visby Airport	Visby	33,521	906	▼97.3%
NOR	Molde Airport Årø	Molde	33,043	3,954	▼88.0%
SWE	Ängelholm Helsingborg Airport	Ängelholm/Helsingborg	30,728	431	▼98.6%
FIN	Kittilä Airport	Kittilä	29,564	0	▼100.0%
NOR	Alta Airport	Alta	28,939	3,894	▼86.5%
FIN	Vaasa Airport	Vaasa	26,954	0	▼100.0%
ISL	Reykjavík Airport	Reykjavík	26,122	2,981	▼88.6%
SWE	Växjö/Kronoberg Airport	Växjö/Alvesta	25,971	0	▼100.0%
NOR	Kirkenes Airport Høybuktmoen	Kirkenes	24,545	2,402	▼90.2%
FIN	Kuopio Airport	Kuopio	22,798	81	▼99.6%
NOR	Bardufoss Airport	Bardufoss	22,623	3,802	▼83.2%
NOR	Kristiansund Airport Kvernberget	Kristiansund N.	22,309	12,117	▼45.7%
SWE	Skellefteå Airport	Skellefteå	20,302	257	▼98.7%
SWE	Kiruna Airport	Kiruna	19,854	1,490	▼92.5%
FIN	Tampere-Pirkkala Airport	Tampere	19,799	16	▼99.9%
SWE	Kalmar Airport	Kalmar	19,444	66	▼99.7%
DEN	Bornholm Airport	Rønne	19,326	3,090	▼84.0%
SWE	Sundsvall Airport	Sundsvall/Härnösand	19,087	35	▼99.8%
SJM	Svalbard Airport Longyear	Longyearbyen	18,974	619	▼96.7%
SWE	Ronneby Airport	Ronneby/Karlskrona	16,827	101	▼99.4%
ISL	Akureyri International Airport	Akureyri	13,538	1,468	▼89.2%

=== 2019 statistics ===
Rank	Country	Airport	City/town/village	Code (IATA/ICAO)	Total passengers	Rank change	Change 2018–2019
1	DEN	Copenhagen Airport	Copenhagen	CPH/EKCH	30,256,407	Steady	▼0.1%
2	NOR	Oslo Airport, Gardermoen	Oslo	OSL/ENGM	28,592,619	Steady	▲0.3%
3	SWE	Stockholm Arlanda Airport	Stockholm	ARN/ESSA	25,642,703	Steady	▼4.5%
4	FIN	Helsinki Airport	Helsinki	HEL/EFHK	21,861,082	Steady	▲4.9%
5	ISL	Keflavík International Airport	Keflavík/Reykjavík	KEF/BIKF	7,247,820	Steady	▼26.1%
6	SWE	Göteborg Landvetter Airport	Gothenburg	GOT/ESGG	6,671,361	Steady	▼2.0%
7	NOR	Bergen Airport Flesland	Bergen	BGO/ENBR	6,505,827	Steady	▲3.2%
8	NOR	Trondheim Airport Værnes	Trondheim	TRD/ENVA	4,381,921	Steady	▼1.3%
9	NOR	Stavanger Airport Sola	Stavanger	SVG/ENZV	4,309,723	Steady	▲1.1%
10	DEN	Billund Airport	Billund	BLL/EKBI	3,739,267	Steady	▲6.4%
11	NOR	Tromsø Airport	Tromsø	TOS/ENTC	2,370,565	▲1	▲1.3%
12	SWE	Stockholm Bromma Airport	Stockholm	BMA/ESSB	2,354,051	▼1	▼6.0%
13	SWE	Stockholm Skavsta Airport	Nyköping/Stockholm	NYO/ESKN	2,296,310	Steady	▲3.7%
14	NOR	Sandefjord Torp Airport	Sandefjord	TRF/ENTO	2,073,228	▲1	▼0.4%
15	SWE	Malmö Airport	Malmö	MMX/ESMS	1,975,842	▼1	▼8.0%
16	NOR	Bodø Airport	Bodø	BOO/ENBO	1,872,649	Steady	▲2.6%
17	DEN	Aalborg Airport	Aalborg	AAL/EKYT	1,446,294	Steady	▼8.8%
18	SWE	Luleå Airport	Luleå	LLA/ESPA	1,162,424	Steady	▼3.3%
19	NOR	Ålesund Airport Vigra	Ålesund	AES/ENAL	1,147,666	Steady	▲1.5%
20	NOR	Kristiansand Airport Kjevik	Kristiansand S.	KRS/ENCN	1,064,387	▲1	▲0.3%
21	FIN	Oulu Airport	Oulu	OUL/EFOU	1,057,355	▼1	▼3.6%
22	SWE	Umeå Airport	Umeå	UME/ESNU	960,284	Steady	▼6.9%
23	NOR	Harstad/Narvik Airport Evenes	Harstad/Narvik	EVE/ENEV	767,812	Steady	▲0.7%
24	FIN	Rovaniemi Airport	Rovaniemi	RVN/EFRO	661,124	Steady	▲2.6%
25	NOR	Haugesund Airport Karmøy	Haugesund	HAU/ENHD	583,935	Steady	▼5.9%
26	DEN	Aarhus Airport	Aarhus	AAR/EKAH	500,365	▲1	▲2.9%
27	SWE	Åre Östersund Airport	Åre/Östersund	OSD/ESNZ	473,628	▼1	▼7.5%
28	FIN	Turku Airport	Turku	TKU/EFTU	452,927	▲7	▲22.6%
29	SWE	Visby Airport	Visby	VBY/ESSV	446,864	▼1	▼4.5%
30	NOR	Molde Airport Årø	Molde	MOL/ENML	431,668	▼1	▼0.7%
31	FRO	Vágar Airport	Vágar/Faroe Islands	FAE/EKVG	424,281	▲3	▲12.3%
32	SWE	Ängelholm Helsingborg Airport	Ängelholm/Helsingborg	AGH/ESTA	386,519	▼1	▼4.1%
33	NOR	Alta Airport	Alta	ALF/ENAT	373,217	Steady	▼3.5%
34	FIN	Kittilä Airport	Kittilä	KTT/EFKT	363,161	▲2	▲2.4%
35	ISL	Reykjavík Airport	Reykjavík	RKV/BIRK	350,858	▼3	▼12.3%
36	NOR	Kristiansund Airport Kvernberget	Kristiansund N.	KSU/ENKB	325,594	▲3	▲3.7%
37	NOR	Kirkenes Airport Høybuktmoen	Kirkenes	KKN/ENKR	316,268	Steady	▲0.1%
38	FIN	Vaasa Airport	Vaasa	VAA/EFVA	303,911	Steady	▼3.8%
39	SWE	Skellefteå Airport	Skellefteå	SFT/ESNS	287,098	▼9	▼29.8%
40	SWE	Växjö/Kronoberg Airport	Växjö/Alvesta	VXO/ESMX	278,397	Steady	▼0.2%
41	SWE	Kiruna Airport	Kiruna	KRN/ESNQ	267,916	Steady	▼3.3%
42	NOR	Bardufoss Airport	Bardufoss	BDU/ENDU	246,420	▲5	▲2.0%
43	FIN	Kuopio Airport	Kuopio	KUO/EFKU	243,529	▲1	▼0.9%
44	FIN	Ivalo Airport	Ivalo	IVL/EFIV	239,753	▲2	▼1.1%
45	DEN	Bornholm Airport	Rønne	RNN/EKRN	236,428	▼2	▼10.6%
46	SWE	Kalmar Airport	Kalmar	KLR/ESMQ	232,049	▼1	▼4.6%
47	SWE	Sundsvall Airport	Sundsvall/Härnösand	SDL/ESNN	231,814	▼5	▼15.3%
48	FIN	Tampere-Pirkkala Airport	Tampere	TMP/EFTP	222,390	Steady	▼2.5%
49	SWE	Ronneby Airport	Ronneby/Karlskrona	RNB/ESDF	204,679	Steady	▼8.6%
50	SJM	Svalbard Airport Longyear	Longyearbyen	LYR/ENSB	185,449	▲1	▲2.2%
51	ISL	Akureyri International Airport	Akureyri	AEY/BIAR	184,262	▼1	▼8.9%
52	NOR	Florø Airport	Florø	FRO/ENFL	155,382	▲2	▲9.5%
53	NOR	Hammerfest Airport	Hammerfest	HFT/ENHF	148,787	▼1	▼13.8%
54	SWE	Linköping City Airport	Linköping	LPI/ESSL	144,585	▼1	▼0.3%
55	NOR	Brønnøysund Airport Brønnøy	Brønnøysund	BNN/ENBN	131,208	▲3	▲0.0%
56	NOR	Leknes Airport	Leknes	LKN/ENLK	131,105	Steady	▼2.0%
57	FIN	Joensuu Airport	Joensuu	JOE/EFJO	126,613	▲2	▲4.2%
58	SWE	Halmstad Airport	Halmstad	HAD/ESMT	124,415	▼3	▼7.8%
59	DEN	Karup Airport	Karup	KRP/EKKA	114,039	▼2	▼14.8%
60	FIN	Kuusamo Airport	Kuusamo	KAO/EFKS	114,003	▲2	▲0.4%
61	SWE	Stockholm-Västerås Airport	Västerås/Stockholm	VST/ESOW	109,133	▲2	▼2.9%
62	NOR	Ørsta–Volda Airport, Hovden	Ørsta/Volda	HOV/ENOV	109,060	▼1	▼5.1%
63	NOR	Mo i Rana Airport Røssvoll	Mo i Rana	MQN/ENRA	106,316	▲2	▼3.0%
64	SWE	Norrköping Airport	Norrköping	NRK/ESSP	103,298	▼4	▼12.4%
65	NOR	Stokmarknes Airport Skagen	Stokmarknes	SKN/ENSK	103,028	▼1	▼7.7%
66	NOR	Vadsø Airport	Vadsø	VDS/ENVD	100,992	▲2	▲0.6%
67	NOR	Svolvær Airport Helle	Svolvær	SVJ/ENSH	94,498	▼1	▼8.7%
68	FIN	Kajaani Airport	Kajaani	KAJ/EFKI	87,307	▲3	▼1.7%
69	SWE	Örnsköldsvik Airport	Örnsköldsvik	OER/ESNO	85,541	▲1	▼4.5%
70	ISL	Egilsstaðir International Airport	Egilsstaðir	EGS/BIEG	83,954	▼1	▼10.9%
71	DEN	Esbjerg Airport	Esbjerg	EBJ/EKEB	83,895	▲8	▲19.3%
72	NOR	Førde Airport Bringeland	Førde	FDE/ENBL	83,306	▲2	▼2.1%
74	FIN	Lappeenranta Airport	Lappeenranta	LPP/EFLP	81,160	No data from 2018	
73	NOR	Sogndal Airport Haukåsen	Sogndal	SOG/ENSG	81,682	Steady	▼5.2%
75	SWE	Örebro Airport	Örebro	ORB/ESOE	77,259	▼3	▼12.4%
76	DEN	Sønderborg Airport	Sønderborg	SGD/EKSB	73,821	▲1	▲2.2%
77	NOR	Sandnessjøen Airport Stokka	Sandnessjøen	SSJ/ENST	73,391	▼1	▼0.6%
78	NOR	Mosjøen Airport Kjærstad	Mosjøen	MJF/ENMS	69,055	▲2	▼1.5%
79	SWE	Jönköping Airport	Jönköping	JKG/ESGJ	66,601	▼12	▼33.7%
80	FIN	Jyväskylä Airport	Jyväskylä	JYV/EFJY	66,572	▼2	▼7.6%
81	FIN	Kemi-Tornio Airport	Kemi/Tornio	KEM/EFKE	63,579	▲1	▼4.8%
82	SWE	Arvidsjaur Airport	Arvidsjaur	AJR/ESNX	58,769	▲4	▲11.6%
83	NOR	Lakselv Airport Banak	Lakselv	LKL/ENNA	58,763	Steady	▼1.4%
84	FIN	Kokkola-Pietarsaari Airport	Kokkola/Jakobstad	KOK/EFKK	56,113	▼3	▼18.2%
85	NOR	Andøya Airport Andenes	Andenes	ANX/ENAN	55,277	▼1	▼7.1%
86	SWE	Karlstad Airport	Karlstad	KSD/ESOK	52,009	▼11	▼36.5%
87	ALA	Mariehamn Airport	Mariehamn	MHQ/EFMA	51,597	▼2	▼5.6%
88	NOR	Namsos Airport	Namsos	OSY/ENNM	43,974	Steady	▲2.4%
89	NOR	Rørvik Airport Ryum	Rørvik	RVK/ENRM	42,553	▲1	▲4.7%
90	NOR	Sandane Airport Anda	Sandane	SDN/ENSD	41,353	▼1	▼2.1%
91	SWE	Kristianstad Airport	Kristianstad	KID/ESMK	40,444	▲2	▲40.1%
92	SWE	Trollhättan–Vänersborg Airport	Trollhättan/Vänersborg	THN/ESGT	37,634	▼5	▼15.7%
93	NOR	Stord Airport Sørstokken	Leirvik	SRP/ENSO	36,742	▼2	▼1.2%
94	ISL	Ísafjörður Airport	Ísafjörður	IFJ/BIIS	32,311	▼2	▼0.6%
95	NOR	Vardø Airport Svartnes	Vardø	VAW/ENSS	29,724	▼3	▲2.1%
96	FIN	Enontekiö Airport	Enontekiö	ENF/EFET	27,979	Steady	▲7.4%
97	SWE	Gällivare Lapland Airport	Gällivare	GEV/ESNG	27,138	▲new	▲33.2%
98	NOR	Hasvik Airport	Hasvik	HAA/ENHK	26,584	▼1	▲2.9%
99	NOR	Båtsfjord Airport	Båtsfjord	BJF/ENBS	26,476	▼5	▼3.3%
100	NOR	Røros Airport	Røros	RRS/ENRO	26,256	▼1	▲7.9%

Out of date statistics for airports without data from 2019 (with at least 20,000 passengers)
Rank	Country	Airport	City/town/village	Code (IATA/ICAO)	Total passengers	Year
	GRL	Kangerlussuaq Airport	Kangerlussuaq	SFJ/BGSF	143,604	2015
	GRL	Nuuk Airport	Nuuk	GOH/BGGH	72,871	2015
	GRL	Ilulissat Airport	Ilulissat	JAV/BGJN	42,575	2015
	GRL	Narsarsuaq Airport	Narsarsuaq	UAK/BGBW	23,083	2015
	GRL	Sisimiut Airport	Sisimiut	JHS/BGSS	20,338	2015

=== 2018 statistics ===
Rank	Country	Airport	City/town/village	Code (IATA/ICAO)	Total passengers	Rank change	Change 2017–2018
1	DEN	Copenhagen Airport	Copenhagen	CPH/EKCH	30,298,428	Steady	▲3.8%
2	NOR	Oslo Airport, Gardermoen	Oslo	OSL/ENGM	28,516,220	Steady	▲3.8%
3	SWE	Stockholm Arlanda Airport	Stockholm	ARN/ESSA	26,845,419	Steady	▲0.8%
4	FIN	Helsinki Airport	Helsinki	HEL/EFHK	20,848,838	Steady	▲10.4%
5	ISL	Keflavík Airport	Keflavík/Reykjavík	KEF/BIKF	9,804,388	Steady	▲12.0%
6	SWE	Göteborg Landvetter Airport	Gothenburg	GOT/ESGG	6,807,976	Steady	▲0.8%
7	NOR	Bergen Airport Flesland	Bergen	BGO/ENBR	6,306,623	Steady	▲3.2%
8	NOR	Trondheim Airport Værnes	Trondheim	TRD/ENVA	4,441,791	Steady	▲0.3%
9	NOR	Stavanger Airport Sola	Stavanger	SVG/ENZV	4,262,476	Steady	▲2.0%
10	DEN	Billund Airport	Billund	BLL/EKBI	3,515,978	Steady	▲4.0%
11	SWE	Stockholm Bromma Airport	Stockholm	BMA/ESSB	2,503,382	Steady	▼1.1%
12	NOR	Tromsø Airport	Tromsø	TOS/ENTC	2,340,097	Steady	▲3.2%
13	SWE	Stockholm Skavsta Airport	Nyköping/Stockholm	NYO/ESKN	2,213,970	▲1	▲4.0%
14	SWE	Malmö Airport	Malmö	MMX/ESMS	2,148,359	▼1	▼1.6%
15	NOR	Sandefjord Torp Airport	Sandefjord	TRF/ENTO	2,081,865	Steady	▲5.9%
16	NOR	Bodø Airport	Bodø	BOO/ENBO	1,824,601	Steady	▼0.3%
17	DEN	Aalborg Airport	Aalborg	AAL/EKYT	1,585,573	Steady	▲5.6%
18	SWE	Luleå Airport	Luleå	LLA/ESPA	1,201,623	Steady	▼0.1%
19	NOR	Ålesund Airport Vigra	Ålesund	AES/ENAL	1,130,868	Steady	▲5.0%
20	FIN	Oulu Airport	Oulu	OUL/EFOU	1,096,917	▲2	▲18.8%
21	NOR	Kristiansand Airport Kjevik	Kristiansand S.	KRS/ENCN	1,061,130	Steady	▲2.9%
22	SWE	Umeå Airport	Umeå	UME/ESNU	1,031,744	▼2	▼2.0%
23	NOR	Harstad/Narvik Airport Evenes	Harstad/Narvik	EVE/ENEV	762,747	Steady	▲1.1%
24	FIN	Rovaniemi Airport	Rovaniemi	RVN/EFRO	644,144	▲1	▲11.2%
25	NOR	Haugesund Airport Karmøy	Haugesund	HAU/ENHD	620,820	▼1	▼1.8%
26	SWE	Åre Östersund Airport	Åre/Östersund	OSD/ESNZ	512,012	Steady	▼3.4%
27	DEN	Aarhus Airport	Aarhus	AAR/EKAH	486,152	▲6	▲30.5%
28	SWE	Visby Airport	Visby	VBY/ESSV	467,885	▼1	▼4.5%
29	NOR	Molde Airport Årø	Molde	MOL/ENML	434,514	▼1	▼9.2%
30	SWE	Skellefteå Airport	Skellefteå	SFT/ESNS	408,948	Steady	▼3.0%
31	SWE	Ängelholm Helsingborg Airport	Ängelholm/Helsingborg	AGH/ESTA	403,103	Steady	▼0.9%
32	ISL	Reykjavík Airport	Reykjavík	RKV/BIRK	400,044	▼3	▼6.0%
33	NOR	Alta Airport	Alta	ALF/ENAT	386,662	▼1	▲2.1%
34	FRO	Vágar Airport	Vágar/Faroe Islands	FAE/EKVG	377,811	Steady	▲10.7%
35	FIN	Turku Airport	Turku	TKU/EFTU	369,432	Steady	▲10.7%
36	FIN	Kittilä Airport	Kittilä	KTT/EFKT	354,561	Steady	▲9.0%
37	NOR	Kirkenes Airport Høybuktmoen	Kirkenes	KKN/ENKR	315,915	Steady	▼0.7%
38	FIN	Vaasa Airport	Vaasa	VAA/EFVA	315,900	Steady	▲5.3%
39	NOR	Kristiansund Airport Kvernberget	Kristiansund N.	KSU/ENKB	314,084	Steady	▲4.8%
40	SWE	Växjö Småland Airport	Växjö/Alvesta	VXO/ESMX	278,972	▲5	▲15.1%
41	SWE	Kiruna Airport	Kiruna	KRN/ESNQ	277,018	Steady	▼1.8%
42	SWE	Sundsvall Airport	Sundsvall/Härnösand	SDL/ESNN	273,527	▼2	▼5.6%
43	DEN	Bornholm Airport	Rønne	RNN/EKRN	264,544	▼1	▲0.5%
44	FIN	Kuopio Airport	Kuopio	KUO/EFKU	245,682	▲3	▲4.4%
45	SWE	Kalmar Airport	Kalmar	KLR/ESMQ	243,271	▼2	▼2.3%
46	FIN	Ivalo Airport	Ivalo	IVL/EFIV	242,457	▲3	▲15.1%
47	NOR	Bardufoss Airport	Bardufoss	BDU/ENDU	241,664	▼3	▼0.6%
48	FIN	Tampere-Pirkkala Airport	Tampere	TMP/EFTP	228,096	Steady	▼0.8%
49	SWE	Ronneby Airport	Ronneby/Karlskrona	RNB/ESDF	224,000	▼3	▼5.5%
50	ISL	Akureyri International Airport	Akureyri	AEY/BIAR	202,252	Steady	▼1.7%
51	SJM	Svalbard Airport Longyear	Longyearbyen	LYR/ENSB	181,469	▲1	▲11.3%
52	NOR	Hammerfest Airport	Hammerfest	HFT/ENHF	172,511	▼1	▼11.2%
53	SWE	Linköping City Airport	Linköping	LPI/ESSL	144,984	▲1	▲1.4%
54	NOR	Florø Airport	Florø	FRO/ENFL	141,866	▲1	▲0.7%
55	SWE	Halmstad City Airport	Halmstad	HAD/ESMT	134,916	▲2	▲1.0%
56	NOR	Leknes Airport	Leknes	LKN/ENLK	133,846	Steady	▼2.1%
57	DEN	Karup Airport	Karup	KRP/EKKA	133,836	▼4	▼8.5%
58	NOR	Brønnøysund Airport Brønnøy	Brønnøysund	BNN/ENBN	131,215	▲4	▲10.9%
59	FIN	Joensuu Airport	Joensuu	JOE/EFJO	121,554	▲2	▲1.5%
60	SWE	Norrköping Airport	Norrköping	NRK/ESSP	117,891	▲7	▲13.1%
61	NOR	Ørsta–Volda Airport, Hovden	Ørsta/Volda	HOV/ENOV	114,922	▲3	▲3.3%
62	FIN	Kuusamo Airport	Kuusamo	KAO/EFKS	113,569	▲11	▲29.4%
63	SWE	Stockholm-Västerås Airport	Västerås/Stockholm	VST/ESOW	112,392	▼4	▼6.7%
64	NOR	Stokmarknes Airport Skagen	Stokmarknes	SKN/ENSK	111,588	▼6	▼7.5%
65	NOR	Mo i Rana Airport Røssvoll	Mo i Rana	MQN/ENRA	109,660	▼5	▼8.8%
66	NOR	Svolvær Airport Helle	Svolvær	SVJ/ENSH	103,530	▼1	▼3.4%
67	SWE	Jönköping Airport	Jönköping	JKG/ESGJ	100,504	▼4	▼11.7%
68	NOR	Vadsø Airport	Vadsø	VDS/ENVD	100,395	Steady	▼3.2%
69	ISL	Egilsstaðir International Airport	Egilsstaðir	EGS/BIEG	94,225	▲1	▼4.8%
70	SWE	Örnsköldsvik Airport	Örnsköldsvik	OER/ESNO	89,562	▲10	▲25.2%
71	FIN	Kajaani Airport	Kajaani	KAJ/EFKI	88,815	▲3	▲1.6%
72	SWE	Örebro Airport	Örebro	ORB/ESOE	88,151	▼3	▼13.6%
73	NOR	Sogndal Airport Haukåsen	Sogndal	SOG/ENSG	86,148	▼2	▼5.5%
74	NOR	Førde Airport Bringeland	Førde	FDE/ENBL	85,083	▲2	▼0.5%
75	SWE	Karlstad Airport	Karlstad	KSD/ESOK	81,884	▼3	▼9.0%
76	NOR	Sandnessjøen Airport Stokka	Sandnessjøen	SSJ/ENST	73,859	▼1	▼14.8%
77	DEN	Sønderborg Airport	Sønderborg	SGD/EKSB	72,215	▲5	▲14.7%
78	FIN	Jyväskylä Airport	Jyväskylä	JYV/EFJY	72,079	▲3	▲6.1%
79	DEN	Esbjerg Airport	Esbjerg	EBJ/EKEB	70,307	▼2	▼16.9%
80	NOR	Mosjøen Airport Kjærstad	Mosjøen	MJF/ENMS	70,094	▼1	▼5.2%
81	FIN	Kokkola-Pietarsaari Airport	Kokkola/Jakobstad	KOK/EFKK	68,636	▼3	▼14.0%
82	FIN	Kemi-Tornio Airport	Kemi/Tornio	KEM/EFKE	66,800	▼16	▼36.1%
83	NOR	Lakselv Airport Banak	Lakselv	LKL/ENNA	59,604	▲2	▼2.3%
84	NOR	Andøya Airport Andenes	Andenes	ANX/ENAN	59,512	Steady	▼3.2%
85	ALA	Mariehamn Airport	Mariehamn	MHQ/EFMA	54,640	▼2	▼11.3%
86	SWE	Arvidsjaur Airport	Arvidsjaur	AJR/ESNX	52,681	Steady	▼8.8%
87	SWE	Trollhättan-Vänersborg Airport	Trollhättan/Vänersborg	THN/ESGT	44,662	▲2	▲12.4%
88	NOR	Namsos Airport	Namsos	OSY/ENNM	42,934	▲2	▲15.2%
89	NOR	Sandane Airport Anda	Sandane	SDN/ENSD	42,251	▼2	▼5.9%
90	NOR	Rørvik Airport Ryum	Rørvik	RVK/ENRM	40,660	▼2	▼4.4%
91	NOR	Stord Airport Sørstokken	Leirvik	SRP/ENSO	37,184	Steady	▲6.2%
92	ISL	Ísafjörður Airport	Ísafjörður	IFJ/BIIS	32,552	▲0	
93	NOR	Vardø Airport Svartnes	Vardø	VAW/ENSS	29,107	▲2	▼3.3%
94	SWE	Kristianstad Airport	Kristianstad	KID/ESMK	28,863	Steady	▼13.8%
95	NOR	Båtsfjord Airport	Båtsfjord	BJF/ENBS	27,390	▲2	▼3.8%
96	SWE	Dala Airport	Borlänge/Falun	BLE/ESSD	26,421	Steady	▼10.6%
97	FIN	Enontekiö Airport	Enontekiö	ENF/EFET	26,063	▲2	▲2.1%
98	NOR	Hasvik Airport	Hasvik	HAA/ENHK	25,846	▲new	▲14.3%
99	NOR	Honningsvåg Airport	Honningsvåg	HVG/ENHV	25,146	▲1	▼0.9%
100	NOR	Røros Airport	Røros	RRS/ENRO	24,341	▲1	▼0.5%

Out of date statistics for airports without data from 2018 (with at least 20,000 passengers)
Rank	Country	Airport	City/town/village	Code (IATA/ICAO)	Total passengers	Year
	GRL	Kangerlussuaq Airport	Kangerlussuaq	SFJ/BGSF	143,604	2015
	GRL	Nuuk Airport	Nuuk	GOH/BGGH	72,871	2015
	GRL	Ilulissat Airport	Ilulissat	JAV/BGJN	42,575	2015
	FIN	Lappeenranta Airport	Lappeenranta	LPP/EFLP	35,792	2015
	GRL	Narsarsuaq Airport	Narsarsuaq	UAK/BGBW	23,083	2015
	GRL	Sisimiut Airport	Sisimiut	JHS/BGSS	20,338	2015

==== International and domestic ====
International passengers 2018
Rank	Country	Airport	City/town/village	Code (IATA/ICAO)	Total passengers
1.	DEN	Copenhagen Airport	Copenhagen	CPH/EKCH	28,300,148
2.	SWE	Stockholm Arlanda Airport	Stockholm	ARN/ESSA	21,549,663
3.	FIN	Helsinki Airport	Helsinki	HEL/EFHK	17,893,738
4.	NOR	Oslo Airport	Oslo	OSL/ENGM	16,491,834
5.	ISL	Keflavík International Airport	Keflavík/Reykjavík	KEF/BIKF	around 9.7 million
Domestic passengers 2018
Rank	Country	Airport	City/town/village	Code (IATA/ICAO)	Total passengers
1.	NOR	Oslo Airport	Oslo	OSL/ENGM	12,003,905
2.	SWE	Stockholm Arlanda Airport	Stockholm	ARN/ESSA	5,295,756
3.	NOR	Bergen Airport Flesland	Bergen	BGO/ENBR	3,634,793
4.	NOR	Trondheim Airport Værnes	Trondheim	TRD/ENVA	3,494,749
5.	FIN	Helsinki Airport	Helsinki	HEL/EFHK	2,955,100

=== 2017 statistics ===
Rank	Country	Airport	City/town/village	Code (IATA/ICAO)	Total passengers	Rank change	Change 2016–2017
1.	DEN	Copenhagen Airport	Copenhagen	CPH/EKCH	29,177,761	Steady	▲0.5%
2.	NOR	Oslo Airport, Gardermoen	Oslo	OSL/ENGM	27,479,921	Steady	▲6.6%
3.	SWE	Stockholm Arlanda Airport	Stockholm	ARN/ESSA	26,622,916	Steady	▲7.9%
4.	FIN	Helsinki Airport	Vantaa/Helsinki	HEL/EFHK	18,892,386	Steady	▲9.9%
5.	ISL	Keflavík International Airport	Keflavík/Reykjavík	KEF/BIKF	8,755,351	Steady	▲28.4%
6.	SWE	Göteborg Landvetter Airport	Gothenburg	GOT/ESGG	6,751,364	Steady	▲6.0%
7.	NOR	Bergen Airport Flesland	Bergen	BGO/ENBR	6,110,944	Steady	▲2.7%
8.	NOR	Trondheim Airport Værnes	Trondheim	TRD/ENVA	4,427,733	Steady	▲0.2%
9.	NOR	Stavanger Airport Sola	Stavanger	SVG/ENZV	4,177,673	Steady	▼0.4%
10.	DEN	Billund Airport	Billund	BLL/EKBI	3,381,584	Steady	▲9.1%
11.	SWE	Stockholm Bromma Airport	Stockholm	BMA/ESSB	2,532,403	Steady	▲1.1%
12.	NOR	Tromsø Airport	Tromsø	TOS/ENTC	2,267,808	▲1	▲7.7%
13.	SWE	Malmö Airport	Malmö	MMX/ESMS	2,183,862	▼1	▼1.6%
14.	SWE	Stockholm Skavsta Airport	Nyköping/Stockholm	NYO/ESKN	2,129,461	Steady	▲5.2%
15.	NOR	Sandefjord Torp Airport	Sandefjord	TRF/ENTO	1,965,558	▲2	▲35.1%
16.	NOR	Bodø Airport	Bodø	BOO/ENBO	1,830,581	▼1	▲1.6%
17.	DEN	Aalborg Airport	Aalborg	AAL/EKYT	1,352,217	▼1	▼10.2%
18.	SWE	Luleå Airport	Luleå	LLA/ESPA	1,203,141	▲1	▲0.5%
19.	NOR	Ålesund Airport Vigra	Ålesund	AES/ENAL	1,076,824	▲1	▲1.5%
20.	SWE	Umeå Airport	Umeå	UME/ESNU	1,052,824	▲1	▼0.4%
21.	NOR	Kristiansand Airport Kjevik	Kristiansand S.	KRS/ENCN	1,030,739	▲2	▲0.8%
22.	FIN	Oulu Airport	Oulu	OUL/EFOU	923,246	Steady	▼10.1%
23.	NOR	Harstad/Narvik Airport Evenes	Harstad/Narvik	EVE/ENEV	754,604	▲1	▲5.5%
24.	NOR	Haugesund Airport Karmøy	Haugesund	HAU/ENHD	632,185	▲1	▲0.9%
25.	FIN	Rovaniemi Airport	Rovaniemi	RVN/EFRO	579,470	▲3	▲18.8%
26.	SWE	Åre Östersund Airport	Åre/Östersund	OSD/ESNZ	529,823	▲1	▲7.0%
27.	SWE	Visby Airport	Visby	VBY/ESSV	490,131	▲2	▲5.7%
28.	NOR	Molde Airport Årø	Molde	MOL/ENML	478,475	▼2	▼5.8%
29.	ISL	Reykjavík Airport	Reykjavík	RKV/BIRK	425,686	▲1	▲2.0%
30.	SWE	Skellefteå Airport	Skellefteå	SFT/ESNS	421,649	▲9	▲50.1%
31.	SWE	Ängelholm Helsingborg Airport	Ängelholm/Helsingborg	AGH/ESTA	406,872	Steady	▼2.4%
32.	NOR	Alta Airport	Alta	ALF/ENAT	378,891	▲1	▲0.4%
33.	DEN	Aarhus Airport	Aarhus	AAR/EKAH	372,532	▼1	▼2.7%
34.	FAE	Vágar Airport	Vágar/Faroe Islands	FAE/EKVG	341,388	▲3	▲16.8%
35.	FIN	Turku Airport	Turku	TKU/EFTU	333,604	▼1	▲2.9%
36.	FIN	Kittilä Airport	Kittilä	KTT/EFKT	325,160	▲7	▲26.3%
37.	NOR	Kirkenes Airport Høybuktmoen	Kirkenes	KKN/ENKR	318,133	▼2	▲1.1%
38.	FIN	Vaasa Airport	Vaasa	VAA/EFVA	300,118	Steady	▲4.0%
39.	NOR	Kristiansund Airport Kvernberget	Kristiansund N.	KSU/ENKB	299,644	▼3	▼1.3%
40.	SWE	Sundsvall Airport	Sundsvall/Härnösand	SDL/ESNN	289,709	Steady	▲3.4%
41.	SWE	Kiruna Airport	Kiruna	KRN/ESNQ	282,144	▲1	▲8.4%
42.	DEN	Bornholm Airport	Rønne	RNN/EKRN	263,118	▼1	▼3.6%
43.	SWE	Kalmar Airport	Kalmar	KLR/ESMQ	249,070	▲2	▲4.3%
44.	NOR	Bardufoss Airport	Bardufoss	BDU/ENDU	243,104	Steady	▲0.2%
45.	SWE	Växjö/Kronoberg Airport	Växjö/Alvesta	VXO/ESMX	242,458	▲7	▲40.7%
46.	SWE	Ronneby Airport	Ronneby/Karlskrona	RNB/ESDF	237,141	Steady	▲2.4%
47.	FIN	Kuopio Airport	Kuopio	KUO/EFKU	235,411	Steady	▲3.6%
48.	FIN	Tampere-Pirkkala Airport	Tampere	TMP/EFTP	230,024	Steady	▲10.1%
49.	FIN	Ivalo Airport	Ivalo	IVL/EFIV	210,566	▲1	▲17.2%
50.	ISL	Akureyri International Airport	Akureyri	AEY/BIAR	205,777	▼1	▲9.0%
51.	NOR	Hammerfest Airport	Hammerfest	HFT/ENHF	194,283	Steady	▲12.7%
52.	SJM	Svalbard Airport Longyear	Longyearbyen	LYR/ENSB	163,052	▲1	▼4.1%
53.	DEN	Midtjyllands Airport	Viborg	KRP/EKKA	146,262	▲2	▼5.6%
54.	SWE	Linköping/Saab Airport	Linköping	LPI/ESSL	142,957	Steady	▼9.4%
55.	NOR	Florø Airport	Florø	FRO/ENFL	140,891	▲1	▼3.8%
56.	NOR	Leknes Airport	Leknes	LKN/ENLK	136,746	▲6	▲20.4%
57.	SWE	Halmstad City Airport	Halmstad	HAD/ESMT	133,590	▲3	▲8.7%
58.	NOR	Stokmarknes Airport Skagen	Stokmarknes	SKN/ENSK	120,692	▲8	▲13.1%
59.	SWE	Stockholm-Västerås Airport	Västerås/Stockholm	VST/ESOW	120,471	▼2	▼16.7%
60.	NOR	Mo i Rana Airport Røssvoll	Mo i Rana	MQN/ENRA	120,239	▼1	▼5.6%
61.	FIN	Joensuu Airport	Joensuu	JOE/EFJO	119,714	Steady	▼2.3%
62.	NOR	Brønnøysund Airport Brønnøy	Brønnøysund	BNN/ENBN	118,344	▼4	▼11.3%
63.	SWE	Jönköping Airport	Jönköping	JKG/ESGJ	113,809	Steady	▲1.2%
64.	NOR	Ørsta–Volda Airport, Hovden	Ørsta/Volda	HOV/ENOV	111,278	▲4	▲6.4%
65.	NOR	Svolvær Airport Helle	Svolvær	SVJ/ENSH	107,144	▲11	▲26.9%
66.	FIN	Kemi-Tornio Airport	Kemi/Tornio	KEM/EFKE	104,462	▲16	▲70.4%
67.	SWE	Norrköping Airport	Norrköping	NRK/ESSP	104,206	▲3	▲4.6%
68.	NOR	Vadsø Airport	Vadsø	VDS/ENVD	103,678	▼1	▼1.0%
69.	SWE	Örebro Airport	Örebro	ORB/ESOE	102,007	▼4	▼6.4%
70.	ISL	Egilsstaðir International Airport	Egilsstaðir	EGS/BIEG	98,989	▲1	▲2.4%
71.	NOR	Sogndal Airport Haukåsen	Sogndal	SOG/ENSG	91,145	▲1	▲1.4%
72.	SWE	Karlstad Airport	Karlstad	KSD/ESOK	89,936	▲3	▲4.8%
73.	FIN	Kuusamo Airport	Kuusamo	KAO/EFKS	87,752	▲6	▲14.2%
74.	FIN	Kajaani Airport	Kajaani	KAJ/EFKI	87,455	Steady	▲1.9%
75.	NOR	Sandnessjøen Airport Stokka	Sandnessjøen	SSJ/ENST	86,676	▼6	▼14.3%
76.	NOR	Førde Airport Bringeland	Førde	FDE/ENBL	85,479	▲1	▲2.1%
77.	DEN	Esbjerg Airport	Esbjerg	EBJ/EKEB	84,646	▼13	▼22.7%
78.	FIN	Kokkola-Pietarsaari Airport	Kokkola/Jakobstad	KOK/EFKK	79,819	▼5	▼10.1%
79.	NOR	Mosjøen Airport Kjærstad	Mosjøen	MJF/ENMS	73,919	▼1	▼11.5%
80.	SWE	Örnsköldsvik Airport	Örnsköldsvik	OER/ESNO	71,535	Steady	▼6.1%
81.	FIN	Jyväskylä Airport	Jyväskylä	JYV/EFJY	67,966	Steady	▲8.8%
82.	DEN	Sønderborg Airport	Sønderborg	SGD/EKSB	62,955	▲4	▲9.2%
83.	FIN	Mariehamn Airport	Mariehamn	MHQ/EFMA	61,568	▲1	▲3.4%
84.	NOR	Andøya Airport Andenes	Andenes	ANX/ENAN	61,510	▲1	▲6.2%
85.	NOR	Lakselv Airport Banak	Lakselv	LKL/ENNA	61,009	▼2	▼0.3%
86.	SWE	Arvidsjaur Airport	Arvidsjaur	AJR/ESNX	57,760	▲1	▲1.4%
87.	NOR	Sandane Airport Anda	Sandane	SDN/ENSD	44,900	▲4	▲3.5%
88.	NOR	Rørvik Airport Ryum	Rørvik	RVK/ENRM	42,510	Steady	▼15.4%
89.	SWE	Trollhättan-Vänersborg Airport	Trollhättan/Vänersborg	THN/ESGT	39,732	▲1	▼9.2%
90.	NOR	Namsos Airport	Namsos	OSY/ENNM	37,260	▼1	▼17.4%
91.	NOR	Stord Airport Sørstokken	Leirvik	SRP/ENSO	35,021	▲1	▼1.2%
92.	ISL	Ísafjörður Airport	Ísafjörður	IFJ/BIIS	34,551	▲2	
93.	SWE	Kristianstad Airport	Kristianstad	KID/ESMK	33,502	▲3	▲8.5%
94.	NOR	Vardø Airport Svartnes	Vardø	VAW/ENSS	30,107	▲1	▼6.1%
95.	SWE	Dala Airport	Borlänge/Falun	BLE/ESSD	29,544	▲3	▲10.2%
96.	NOR	Båtsfjord Airport	Båtsfjord	BJF/ENBS	28,474	▲1	▼2.3%
97.	SWE	Lapland Airport	Gällivare	GEV/ESNG	26,769	▼4	▼21.9%
98.	FIN	Enontekiö Airport	Enontekiö	ENF/EFET	25,537	▲new	▲14.7%
99.	NOR	Honningsvåg Airport	Honningsvåg	HVG/ENHV	25,385	▲new	▼0.1%
100.	NOR	Røros Airport	Røros	RRS/ENRO	24,473	▲new	▲16.3%

Airports which have left top 100 in 2017
Rank	Country	Airport	City/town/village	Code (IATA/ICAO)	Total passengers (2017)	Change 2016–2017
	NOR	Moss Airport Rygge	Oslo/Moss	RYG/ENRY	0	▼100.0%
	NOR	Narvik Airport Framnes	Narvik	NVK/ENNK	6,957	▼72.9%
	NOR	Sørkjosen Airport	Sørkjosen	SOJ/ENSR	22,256	▼14.0%
Some other airports with at least 20,000 (might enter top 100 in 2018)
	NOR	Mehamn Airport	Mehamn	MEH/ENMH	23,794	▼2.9%
	FIN	Pori Airport	Pori	POR/EFPO	23,183	▲140.8%
	NOR	Hasvik Airport	Hasvik	HAA	22,607	▲56.1%
Out of date statistics for airports without data from 2017 (with at least 20,000 passengers)
Rank	Country	Airport	City/town/village	Code (IATA/ICAO)	Total passengers	Year
	GRL	Kangerlussuaq Airport	Kangerlussuaq	SFJ/BGSF	143,604	2015
	GRL	Nuuk Airport	Nuuk	GOH/BGGH	72,871	2015
	GRL	Ilulissat Airport	Ilulissat	JAV/BGJN	42,575	2015
	GRL	Narsarsuaq Airport	Narsarsuaq	UAK/BGBW	23,083	2015
	GRL	Sisimiut Airport	Sisimiut	JHS/BGSS	20,338	2015

==== International and domestic ====
International passengers 2017
Rank	Country	Airport	City/town/village	Code (IATA/ICAO)	Total passengers
1.	DEN	Copenhagen Airport	Copenhagen	CPH/EKCH	27,566,464
2.	SWE	Stockholm Arlanda Airport	Stockholm	ARN/ESSA	21,145,249
3.	FIN	Helsinki Airport	Helsinki	HEL/EFHK	16,160,932
4.	NOR	Oslo Airport	Oslo	OSL/ENGM	15,826,395
5.	ISL	Keflavík International Airport	Keflavík/Reykjavík	KEF/BIKF	around 8.7 million

Domestic passengers 2017
Rank	Country	Airport	City/town/village	Code (IATA/ICAO)	Total passengers
1.	NOR	Oslo Airport	Oslo	OSL/ENGM	11,629,232
2.	SWE	Stockholm Arlanda Airport	Stockholm	ARN/ESSA	5,477,667
3.	NOR	Bergen Airport Flesland	Bergen	BGO/ENBR	3,548,548
4.	NOR	Trondheim Airport Værnes	Trondheim	TRD/ENVA	3,468,069
5.	FIN	Helsinki Airport	Helsinki	HEL/EFHK	2,731,454

=== 2016 statistics ===
Rank	Country	Airport	City/town/village	Code (IATA/ICAO)	Total passengers	Rank change	Change 2015–2016
1.	DEN	Copenhagen Airport	Copenhagen	CPH/EKCH	29,043,287	Steady	▲9.1%
2.	NOR	Oslo Airport, Gardermoen	Oslo	OSL/ENGM	25,787,691	Steady	▲4.5%
3.	SWE	Stockholm Arlanda Airport	Stockholm	ARN/ESSA	24,682,466	Steady	▲6.7%
4.	FIN	Helsinki-Vantaa Airport	Helsinki	HEL/EFHK	17,184,681	Steady	▲4.6%
5.	ISL	Keflavík International Airport	Keflavík/Reykjavík	KEF/BIKF	6,821,358	▲2	▲40.4%
6.	SWE	Göteborg Landvetter Airport	Gothenburg	GOT/ESGG	6,369,396	▼1	▲3.4%
7.	NOR	Bergen Airport Flesland	Bergen	BGO/ENBR	5,949,060	▼1	▼1.2%
8.	NOR	Trondheim Airport Værnes	Trondheim	TRD/ENVA	4,417,490	▲1	▲1.5%
9.	NOR	Stavanger Airport Sola	Stavanger	SVG/ENZV	4,193,665	▼1	▼6.8%
10.	DEN	Billund Airport	Billund	BLL/EKBI	3,100,923	Steady	▲6.5%
11.	SWE	Stockholm Bromma Airport	Stockholm	BMA/ESSB	2,503,961	Steady	▲0.6%
12.	SWE	Malmö Airport	Malmö	MMX/ESMS	2,218,245	Steady	▲2.2%
13.	NOR	Tromsø Airport	Tromsø	TOS/ENTC	2,104,861	Steady	▲4.8%
14.	SWE	Stockholm Skavsta Airport	Nyköping/Stockholm	NYO/ESKN	2,025,055	Steady	▲11.8%
15.	NOR	Bodø Airport	Bodø	BOO/ENBO	1,801,249	Steady	▲3.9%
16.	DEN	Aalborg Airport	Aalborg	AAL/EKYT	1,505,561	▲2	▲4.5%
17.	NOR	Sandefjord Torp Airport	Sandefjord	TRF/ENTO	1,455,264	Steady	▼5.7%
18.	NOR	Moss Airport Rygge	Moss	RYG/ENRY	1,304,379	▼2	▼20.6%
19.	SWE	Luleå Airport	Luleå	LLA/ESPA	1,197,014	Steady	▲1.7%
20.	NOR	Ålesund Airport Vigra	Ålesund	AES/ENAL	1,060,561	Steady	▼1.8%
21.	SWE	Umeå Airport	Umeå	UME/ESNU	1,057,373	▲1	▲1.0%
22.	FIN	Oulu Airport	Oulu	OUL/EFOU	1,027,495	▲1	▲4.6%
23.	NOR	Kristiansand Airport Kjevik	Kristiansand	KRS/ENCN	1,022,469	▼2	▼3.4%
24.	NOR	Harstad/Narvik Airport Evenes	Harstad/Narvik	EVE/ENEV	715,272	Steady	▲0.9%
25.	NOR	Haugesund Airport Karmøy	Haugesund	HAU/ENHD	626,593	Steady	▼5.1%
26.	NOR	Molde Airport Årø	Molde	MOL/ENML	507,991	Steady	▼1.7%
27.	SWE	Åre Östersund Airport	Åre/Östersund	OSD/ESNZ	495,228	▲1	▲6.5%
28.	FIN	Rovaniemi Airport	Rovaniemi	RVN/EFRO	487,857	▼1	▲2.0%
29.	SWE	Visby Airport	Visby	VBY/ESSV	463,616	Steady	▲7.5%
30.	ISL	Reykjavík Airport	Reykjavík	RKV/BIRK	417,309	▲2	▲7.3%
31.	SWE	Ängelholm Helsingborg Airport	Ängelholm/Helsingborg	AGH/ESTA	416,675	▼1	▲1.2%
32.	DEN	Aarhus Airport	Aarhus	AAR/EKAH	383,009	▲2	▲5.1%
33.	NOR	Alta Airport	Alta	ALF/ENAT	377,294	▼2	▼3.9%
34.	FIN	Turku Airport	Turku	TKU/EFTU	324,077	▲2	▲3.8%
35.	NOR	Kirkenes Airport Høybuktmoen	Kirkenes	KKN/ENKR	314,555	▲2	▲1.1%
36.	NOR	Kristiansund Airport Kvernberget	Kristiansund N.	KSU/ENKB	303,505	▼3	▼17.1%
37.	FAE	Vágar Airport	Vágar/Faroe Islands	FAE/EKVG	292,393	▲3	▲5.8%
38.	FIN	Vaasa Airport	Vaasa	VAA/EFVA	288,520	▲1	▲2.2%
39.	SWE	Skellefteå Airport	Skellefteå	SFT/ESNS	280,926	▼1	▼6.4%
40.	SWE	Sundsvall Airport	Sundsvall/Härnösand	SDL/ESNN	280,077	▲1	▲3.2%
41.	DEN	Bornholm Airport	Rønne	RNN/EKRN	272,995	▲1	▲5.2%
42.	SWE	Kiruna Airport	Kiruna	KRN/ESNQ	260,318	▲1	▲1.1%
43.	FIN	Kittilä Airport	Kittilä	KTT/EFKT	257,545	▲2	▲13.5%
44.	NOR	Bardufoss Airport	Bardufoss	BDU/ENDU	242,716	▲2	▲7.4%
45.	SWE	Kalmar Airport	Kalmar	KLR/ESMQ	238,691	▲2	▲7.1%
46.	SWE	Ronneby Airport	Ronneby/Karlskrona	RNB/ESDF	231,562	▲2	▲7.1%
47.	FIN	Kuopio Airport	Kuopio	KUO/EFKU	227,194	▼3	▼2.2%
48.	FIN	Tampere-Pirkkala Airport	Tampere	TMP/EFTP	208,930	▼13	▼41.5%
49.	ISL	Akureyri International Airport	Akureyri	AEY/BIAR	188,810	▲2	▲6.9%
50.	FIN	Ivalo Airport	Ivalo	IVL/EFIV	179,627	▲5	▲15.7%
51.	NOR	Hammerfest Airport	Hammerfest	HFT/ENHF	172,441	▲1	▼1.7%
52.	SWE	Växjö Småland Airport	Växjö/Alvesta	VXO/ESMX	172,353	▼3	▼7.3%
53.	SJM	Svalbard Airport Longyear	Longyearbyen	LYR/ENSB	170,014	Steady	▲2.7%
54.	SWE	Linköping City Airport	Linköping	LPI/ESSL	157,780	Steady	▲0.3%
55.	DEN	Karup Airport	Karup	KRP/EKKA	154,898	▲1	▲13.9%
56.	NOR	Florø Airport	Florø	FRO/ENFL	146,437	▼6	▼17.2%
57.	SWE	Stockholm-Västerås Airport	Västerås/Stockholm	VST/ESOW	144,666	▲6	▲27.2%
58.	NOR	Brønnøysund Airport Brønnøy	Brønnøysund	BNN/ENBN	133,393	▲1	▲2.9%
59.	NOR	Mo i Rana Airport Røssvoll	Mo i Rana	MQN/ENRA	127,404	▲2	▲6.5%
60.	SWE	Halmstad City Airport	Halmstad	HAD/ESMT	122,930	Steady	▲2.5%
61.	FIN	Joensuu Airport	Joensuu	JOE/EFJO	122,543	▼4	▼8.4%
62.	NOR	Leknes Airport	Leknes	LKN/ENLK	113,595	▲5	▲7.7%
63.	SWE	Jönköping Airport	Jönköping	JKG/ESGJ	112,506	▲3	▲5.2%
64.	DEN	Esbjerg Airport	Esbjerg	EBJ/EKEB	109,457	▼6	▼16.5%
65.	SWE	Örebro Airport	Örebro	ORB/ESOE	108,990	▲5	▲14.3%
66.	NOR	Stokmarknes Airport Skagen	Stokmarknes	SKN/ENSK	106,727	▼1	▼0.6%
67.	NOR	Vadsø Airport	Vadsø	VDS/ENVD	104,697	▲1	▲2.4%
68.	NOR	Ørsta–Volda Airport, Hovden	Ørsta/Volda	HOV/ENOV	104,627	▼6	▼9.0%
69.	NOR	Sandnessjøen Airport Stokka	Sandnessjøen	SSJ/ENST	101,123	Steady	▼0.7%
70.	SWE	Norrköping Airport	Norrköping	NRK/ESSP	99,609	▼6	▼8.7%
71.	ISL	Egilsstaðir International Airport	Egilsstaðir	EGS/BIEG	96,629	▲1	▲5.8%
72.	NOR	Sogndal Airport Haukåsen	Sogndal	SOG/ENSG	89,874	▲2	▲4.5%
73.	FIN	Kokkola-Pietarsaari Airport	Kokkola/Jakobstad	KOK/EFKK	88,766	Steady	▲0.8%
74.	FIN	Kajaani Airport	Kajaani	KAJ/EFKI	85,853	▲1	▲2.2%
75.	SWE	Karlstad Airport	Karlstad	KSD/ESOK	85,848	▼4	▼8.2%
76.	NOR	Svolvær Airport Helle	Svolvær	SVJ/ENSH	84,448	▲2	▲3.1%
77.	NOR	Førde Airport Bringeland	Førde	FDE/ENBL	83,752	▼1	▲1.0%
78.	NOR	Mosjøen Airport Kjærstad	Mosjøen	MJF/ENMS	83,518	▼1	▲1.3%
79.	FIN	Kuusamo Airport	Kuusamo	KAO/EFKS	76,848	▲1	▲11.5%
80.	SWE	Örnsköldsvik Airport	Örnsköldsvik	OER/ESNO	76,178	▼1	▼6.2%
81.	FIN	Jyväskylä Airport	Jyväskylä	JYV/EFJY	62,448	▲1	▲1.0%
82.	FIN	Kemi-Tornio Airport	Kemi/Tornio	KEM/EFKE	61,314	▲3	▲8.8%
83.	NOR	Lakselv Airport Banak	Lakselv	LKL/ENNA	61,208	▼2	▼6.7%
84.	ALA	Mariehamn Airport	Mariehamn	MHQ/EFMA	59,544	▼1	▲0.4%
85.	NOR	Andøya Airport Andenes	Andenes	ANX/ENAN	57,945	▼1	▲1.8%
86.	DEN	Sønderborg Airport	Sønderborg	SGD/EKSB	57,661	Steady	▲2.5%
87.	SWE	Arvidsjaur Airport	Arvidsjaur	AJR/ESNX	56,940	Steady	▲11.3%
88.	NOR	Rørvik Airport Ryum	Rørvik	RVK/ENRM	50,260	Steady	▲0.8%
89.	NOR	Namsos Airport	Namsos	OSY/ENNM	45,106	▲1	▼1.2%
90.	SWE	Trollhättan-Vänersborg Airport	Trollhättan/Vänersborg	THN/ESGT	43,740	▲1	▼1.5%
91.	NOR	Sandane Airport Anda	Sandane	SDN/ENSD	43,398	▲1	▲4.9%
92.	NOR	Stord Airport Sørstokken	Leirvik	SRP/ENSO	35,454	▼3	▼25.9%
93.	SWE	Lapland Airport	Gällivare	GEV/ESNG	34,286	Steady	▼5.8%
94.	ISL	Ísafjörður Airport	Ísafjörður	IFJ/BIIS	33,076	▲2	▲4.4%
95.	NOR	Vardø Airport Svartnes	Vardø	VAW/ENSS	32,063	▲3	▲4.1%
96.	SWE	Kristianstad Airport	Kristianstad	KID/ESMK	30,873	▼1	▼13.7%
97.	NOR	Båtsfjord Airport	Båtsfjord	BJF/ENBS	29,148	▲2	▲9.0%
98.	SWE	Dala Airport	Borlänge/Falun	BLE/ESSD	26,804	▼1	▼17.1%
99.	NOR	Sørkjosen Airport	Sørkjosen	SOJ/ENSR	25,882	▲new	▲8.7%
100.	NOR	Narvik Airport Framnes	Narvik	NVK/ENNK	25,708	Steady	▼1.6%

Airports which have left top 100 in 2016
Rank	Country	Airport	City/town/village	Code (IATA/ICAO)	Total passengers (2016)	Change 2015–2016
	FIN	Lappeenranta Airport	Lappeenranta	LPP/EFLP	0	▼100.0%
Some other airports with at least 20,000 (might enter top 100 in 2017)
	NOR	Honningsvåg Airport	Honningsvåg	HVG/ENHV	25,410	▲7.8%
	NOR	Mehamn Airport	Mehamn	MEH/ENMH	24,512	▲7.4%
	FIN	Enontekiö Airport	Enontekiö	ENF/EFET	22,273	▲4.1%
	DEN	Roskilde Airport	Roskilde/Copenhagen	RKE/EKRK	21,535	▼1.0%
	NOR	Røros Airport	Røros	RRS/ENRO	21,042	▲2.9%
Out of date statistics for airports without data from 2016 (with at least 20,000 passengers)
Rank	Country	Airport	City/town/village	Code (IATA/ICAO)	Total passengers	Year
	GRL	Kangerlussuaq Airport	Kangerlussuaq	SFJ/BGSF	143,604	2015
	GRL	Nuuk Airport	Nuuk	GOH/BGGH	72,871	2015
	GRL	Ilulissat Airport	Ilulissat	JAV/BGJN	42,575	2015
	GRL	Narsarsuaq Airport	Narsarsuaq	UAK/BGBW	23,083	2015
	GRL	Sisimiut Airport	Sisimiut	JHS/BGSS	20,338	2015

=== 2015 statistics ===
Rank	Country	Airport	City/town/village	Code (IATA/ICAO)	Total passengers	Rank change	Change 2014–2015
1.	DEN	Copenhagen Airport	Copenhagen	CPH/EKCH	26,610,332	Steady	▲3.8%
2.	NOR	Oslo Airport, Gardermoen	Oslo	OSL/ENGM	24,678,195	Steady	▲1.7%
3.	SWE	Stockholm Arlanda Airport	Stockholm	ARN/ESSA	23,142,536	Steady	▲3.1%
4.	FIN	Helsinki Airport	Helsinki	HEL/EFHK	16,422,266	Steady	▲3.0%
5.	SWE	Göteborg Landvetter Airport	Gothenburg	GOT/ESGG	6,158,334	▲1	▲18.1%
6.	NOR	Bergen Airport Flesland	Bergen	BGO/ENBR	6,020,866	▼1	▼3.2%
7.	ISL	Keflavík International Airport	Keflavík/Reykjavík	KEF/BIKF	4,858,776	▲2	▲25.6%
8.	NOR	Stavanger Airport Sola	Stavanger	SVG/ENZV	4,501,368	▼1	▼4.7%
9.	NOR	Trondheim Airport Værnes	Trondheim	TRD/ENVA	4,352,721	▼1	▼1.4%
10.	DEN	Billund Airport	Billund	BLL/EKBI	2,910,735	Steady	▲1.9%
11.	SWE	Stockholm Bromma Airport	Stockholm	BMA/ESSB	2,488,779	Steady	▲4.6%
12.	SWE	Malmö Airport	Malmö	MMX/ESMS	2,169,901	Steady	▲3.9%
13.	NOR	Tromsø Airport	Tromsø	TOS/ENTC	2,009,146	Steady	▲0.1%
14.	SWE	Stockholm Skavsta Airport	Nyköping/Stockholm	NYO/ESKN	1,811,730	▲3	▲9.3%
15.	NOR	Bodø Airport	Bodø	BOO/ENBO	1,733,330	▲1	▲1.7%
16.	NOR	Moss Airport Rygge	Oslo/Moss	RYG/ENRY	1,642,156	▼2	▼9.1%
17.	NOR	Sandefjord Torp Airport	Sandefjord	TRF/ENTO	1,542,541	▼2	▼12.5%
18.	DEN	Aalborg Airport	Aalborg	AAL/EKYT	1,440,477	Steady	▲3.2%
19.	SWE	Luleå Airport	Luleå	LLA/ESPA	1,177,131	Steady	▲3.2%
20.	NOR	Ålesund Airport Vigra	Ålesund	AES/ENAL	1,080,045	Steady	▼3.6%
21.	NOR	Kristiansand Airport Kjevik	Kristiansand S.	KRS/ENCN	1,058,231	Steady	▼1.3%
22.	SWE	Umeå Airport	Umeå	UME/ESNU	1,047,081	Steady	▲0.4%
23.	FIN	Oulu Airport	Oulu	OUL/EFOU	982,723	Steady	▲2.3%
24.	NOR	Harstad/Narvik Airport Evenes	Harstad/Narvik	EVE/ENEV	709,239	▲1	▲0.5%
25.	NOR	Haugesund Airport Karmøy	Haugesund	HAU/ENHD	659,937	▲1	▼5.0%
26.	NOR	Molde Airport Årø	Molde	MOL/ENML	517,031	▲1	▲6.9%
27.	FIN	Rovaniemi Airport	Rovaniemi	RVN/EFRO	478,347	▲2	▲7.6%
28.	SWE	Åre Östersund Airport	Åre/Östersund	OSD/ESNZ	464,816	Steady	▲0.9%
29.	SWE	Visby Airport	Visby	VBY/ESSV	431,430	▲3	▲6.0%
30.	SWE	Ängelholm Helsingborg Airport	Ängelholm/Helsingborg	AGH/ESTA	411,625	▲3	▲3.7%
31.	NOR	Alta Airport	Alta	ALF/ENAT	392,520	▲4	▲4.2%
32.	ISL	Reykjavík Airport	Reykjavík	RKV/BIRK	388,977	▲4	▲6.6%
33.	NOR	Kristiansund Airport Kvernberget	Kristiansund N.	KSU/ENKB	366,292	▲1	▼5.5%
34.	DEN	Aarhus Airport	Aarhus	AAR/EKAH	364,546	▼4	▼13.5%
35.	FIN	Tampere-Pirkkala Airport	Tampere	TMP/EFTP	357,082	▼4	▼13.5%
36.	FIN	Turku Airport	Turku	TKU/EFTU	312,105	▲4	▲4.8%
37.	NOR	Kirkenes Airport Høybuktmoen	Kirkenes	KKN/ENKR	311,016	▲2	▲0.2%
38.	SWE	Skellefteå Airport	Skellefteå	SFT/ESNS	300,278	Steady	▼6.1%
39.	FIN	Vaasa Airport	Vaasa	VAA/EFVA	282,437	▼2	▼13.3%
40.	FAE	Vágar Airport	Vágar/Faroe Islands	FAE/EKVG	276,385	▲4	▲10.4%
41.	SWE	Sundsvall Airport	Sundsvall/Härnösand	SDL/ESNN	271,353	Steady	▼2.6%
42.	DEN	Bornholm Airport	Rønne	RNN/EKRN	259,440	▲3	▲8.1%
43.	SWE	Kiruna Airport	Kiruna	KRN/ESNQ	257,561	▼1	▼4.9%
44.	FIN	Kuopio Airport	Kuopio	KUO/EFKU	232,267	▼1	▼10.8%
45.	FIN	Kittilä Airport	Kittilä	KTT/EFKT	226,819	▲1	▼3.4%
46.	NOR	Bardufoss Airport	Bardufoss	BDU/ENDU	225,893	▲1	▲3.4%
47.	SWE	Kalmar Airport	Kalmar	KLR/ESMQ	222,848	▲2	▲4.3%
48.	SWE	Ronneby Airport	Ronneby/Karlskrona	RNB/ESDF	216,304	Steady	▲0.5%
49.	SWE	Växjö Småland Airport	Växjö/Alvesta	VXO/ESMX	185,980	▲2	▲4.1%
50.	NOR	Florø Airport	Florø	FRO/ENFL	176,795	Steady	▼14.1%
51.	ISL	Akureyri International Airport	Akureyri	AEY/BIAR	176,576	▲1	▲0.0%
52.	NOR	Hammerfest Airport	Hammerfest	HFT/ENHF	175,351	▲1	▲1.8%
53.	SJM	Svalbard Airport Longyear	Longyearbyen	LYR/ENSB	165,584	▲1	▲2.7%
54.	SWE	Linköping City Airport	Linköping	LPI/ESSL	157,346	▲3	▲12.8%
55.	FIN	Ivalo Airport	Ivalo	IVL/EFIV	155,208	Steady	▲8.8%
56.	DEN	Karup Airport	Karup	KRP/EKKA	135,975	▲4	▲7.5%
57.	FIN	Joensuu Airport	Joensuu	JOE/EFJO	133,726	▲1	▼3.3%
58.	DEN	Esbjerg Airport	Esbjerg	EBJ/EKEB	131,138	▲5	▲8.1%
59.	NOR	Brønnøysund Airport Brønnøy	Brønnøysund	BNN/ENBN	129,600	▼3	▼9.1%
60.	SWE	Halmstad City Airport	Halmstad	HAD/ESMT	119,959	▲1	▼4.9%
61.	NOR	Mo i Rana Airport Røssvoll	Mo i Rana	MQN/ENRA	119,641	▲3	▼0.4%
62.	NOR	Ørsta–Volda Airport, Hovden	Ørsta/Volda	HOV/ENOV	115,009	Steady	▼7.0%
63.	SWE	Stockholm-Västerås Airport	Västerås/Stockholm	VST/ESOW	113,723	▲2	▼3.1%
64.	SWE	Norrköping Airport	Norrköping	NRK/ESSP	109,137	▼5	▼17.2%
65.	NOR	Stokmarknes Airport Skagen	Stokmarknes	SKN/ENSK	107,400	▲1	▲0.1%
66.	SWE	Jönköping Airport	Jönköping	JKG/ESGJ	106,923	▲5	▲12.4%
67.	NOR	Leknes Airport	Leknes	LKN/ENLK	105,470	Steady	▼1.0%
68.	NOR	Vadsø Airport	Vadsø	VDS/ENVD	102,215	Steady	▲0.5%
69.	NOR	Sandnessjøen Airport Stokka	Sandnessjøen	SSJ/ENST	101,849	Steady	▲4.5%
70.	SWE	Örebro Airport	Örebro	ORB/ESOE	95,395	Steady	▼0.9%
71.	SWE	Karlstad Airport	Karlstad	KSD/ESOK	93,517	▲7	▲12.3%
72.	ISL	Egilsstaðir International Airport	Egilsstaðir	EGS/BIEG	91,373	▲2	▲2.5%
73.	FIN	Kokkola-Pietarsaari Airport	Kokkola/Jakobstad	KOK/EFKK	88,039	▲9	▲28.2%
74.	NOR	Sogndal Airport Haukåsen	Sogndal	SOG/ENSG	86,023	▼2	▼6.7%
75.	FIN	Kajaani Airport	Kajaani	KAJ/EFKI	84,029	▲6	▲16.9%
76.	NOR	Førde Airport Bringeland	Førde	FDE/ENBL	82,909	▼1	▼3.7%
77.	NOR	Mosjøen Airport Kjærstad	Mosjøen	MJF/ENMS	82,451	▼1	▼3.0%
78.	NOR	Svolvær Airport Helle	Svolvær	SVJ/ENSH	81,878	▲1	▲4.7%
79.	SWE	Örnsköldsvik Airport	Örnsköldsvik	OER/ESNO	81,182	▼2	▼3.5%
80.	FIN	Kuusamo Airport	Kuusamo	KAO/EFKS	68,905	Steady	▼6.2%
81.	NOR	Lakselv Airport Banak	Lakselv	LKL/ENNA	65,624	▲2	▲3.5%
82.	FIN	Jyväskylä Airport	Jyväskylä	JYV/EFJY	61,844	▲5	▲11.0%
83.	ALA	Mariehamn Airport	Mariehamn	MHQ/EFMA	59,336	▲5	▲13.9%
84.	NOR	Andøya Airport Andenes	Andenes	ANX/ENAN	56,897	▲1	▼3.3%
85.	FIN	Kemi-Tornio Airport	Kemi/Tornio	KEM/EFKE	56,342	▼1	▼4.6%
86.	DEN	Sønderborg Airport	Sønderborg	SGD/EKSB	56,257	Steady	▼2.6%
87.	SWE	Arvidsjaur Airport	Arvidsjaur	AJR/ESNX	51,173	▲2	▲0.5%
88.	NOR	Rørvik Airport Ryum	Rørvik	RVK/ENRM	49,840	▲2	▲0.4%
89.	NOR	Stord Airport Sørstokken	Leirvik	SRP/ENSO	47,814	▲7	▲25.0%
90.	NOR	Namsos Airport	Namsos	OSY/ENNM	45,641	▲1	▼1.0%
91.	SWE	Trollhättan-Vänersborg Airport	Trollhättan/Vänersborg	THN/ESGT	44,425	▲1	▲0.4%
92.	NOR	Sandane Airport Anda	Sandane	SDN/ENSD	41,368	▲1	▼3.9%
93.	SWE	Lapland Airport	Gällivare	GEV/ESNG	36,381	▲1	▼11.1%
94.	FIN	Lappeenranta Airport	Lappeenranta	LPP/EFLP	35,792	▼21	▼60.0%
95.	SWE	Kristianstad Airport	Kristianstad	KID/ESMK	35,767	Steady	▼9.2%
96.	ISL	Ísafjörður Airport	Ísafjörður	IFJ/BIIS	33,343		
97.	SWE	Dala Airport	Borlänge/Falun	BLE/ESSD	32,342	▲1	▼5.5%
98.	NOR	Vardø Airport Svartnes	Vardø	VAW/ENSS	30,786	▲2	▲0.0%
99.	NOR	Båtsfjord Airport	Båtsfjord	BJF/ENBS	26,732	▲new	▲3.3%
100.	NOR	Narvik Airport Framnes	Narvik	NVK/ENNK	26,138	▲1	▼3.9%

Airports which have left top 100 in 2015
Rank	Country	Airport	City/town/village	Code (IATA/ICAO)	Total passengers (2015)	Change 2014–2015
	NOR	Skien Airport	Skien	SKE/ENSN	13,411	▼59.5%
	SWE	Göteborg City Airport	Gothenburg	GSE/ESGP	2,121	▼99.7%
Some other airports with at least 20,000 (might enter top 100 in 2016)
	NOR	Sørkjosen Airport	Sørkjosen	SOJ/ENSR	23,804	
	NOR	Honningsvåg Airport	Honningsvåg	HVG/ENHV	23,580	
	NOR	Mehamn Airport	Mehamn	MEH/ENMH	22,813	
	DEN	Roskilde Airport	Roskilde/Copenhagen	RKE/EKRK	21,758	
	FIN	Enontekiö Airport	Enontekiö	ENF/EFET	21,390	
	NOR	Røros Airport	Røros	RRS/ENRO	20,456	
	SWE	Lycksele Airport	Lycksele	LYC/ESNL	20,023	

Out of date statistics for airports without data from 2015 (with at least 20,000 passengers)
Rank	Country	Airport	City/town/village	Code (IATA/ICAO)	Total passengers	Year
	GRL	Kangerlussuaq Airport	Kangerlussuaq	SFJ/BGSF	143,604	2015
	GRL	Nuuk Airport	Nuuk	GOH/BGGH	72,871	2015
	GRL	Ilulissat Airport	Ilulissat	JAV/BGJN	42,575	2015
	ISL	Ísafjörður Airport	Ísafjörður	IFJ/BIIS	35,577	2013
	GRL	Narsarsuaq Airport	Narsarsuaq	UAK/BGBW	23,083	2015
	GRL	Sisimiut Airport	Sisimiut	JHS/BGSS	20,338	2015

=== 2014 statistics ===
Rank	Country	Airport	City/town/village	Code (IATA/ICAO)	Total passengers	Rank change	Change 2013–2014
1.	DEN	Copenhagen Airport	Copenhagen	CPH/EKCH	25,627,093	Steady	▲6.5%
2.	NOR	Oslo Airport	Oslo	OSL/ENGM	24,269,235	Steady	▲5.7%
3.	SWE	Stockholm Arlanda Airport	Stockholm	ARN/ESSA	22,443,272	Steady	▲8.6%
4.	FIN	Helsinki Airport	Helsinki	HEL/EFHK	15,948,760	Steady	▲4.4%
5.	NOR	Bergen Airport Flesland	Bergen	BGO/ENBR	6,216,841	Steady	▲0.0%
6.	SWE	Göteborg Landvetter Airport	Gothenburg	GOT/ESGG	5,216,011	Steady	▲4.4%
7.	NOR	Stavanger Airport Sola	Stavanger	SVG/ENZV	4,721,970	Steady	▲1.1%
8.	NOR	Trondheim Airport Værnes	Trondheim	TRD/ENVA	4,416,681	Steady	▲2.4%
9.	ISL	Keflavík International Airport	Keflavík/Reykjavík	KEF/BIKF	3,867,418	Steady	▲20.5%
10.	DEN	Billund Airport	Billund	BLL/EKBI	2,856,819	Steady	▲1.0%
11.	SWE	Stockholm Bromma Airport	Stockholm	BMA/ESSB	2,379,752	Steady	▲4.5%
12.	SWE	Malmö Airport	Malmö	MMX/ESMS	2,088,388	▲1	▼1.7%
13.	NOR	Tromsø Airport	Tromsø	TOS/ENTC	2,006,924	▲1	▲3.7%
14.	NOR	Moss Airport Rygge	Oslo/Moss	RYG/ENRY	1,806,981	▲1	▼4.4%
15.	NOR	Sandefjord Torp Airport	Sandefjord	TRF/ENTO	1,763,673	▲1	▼5.0%
16.	NOR	Bodø Airport	Bodø	BOO/ENBO	1,703,597	▲1	▲2.1%
17.	SWE	Stockholm Skavsta Airport	Nyköping/Stockholm	NYO/ESKN	1,657,335	▼5	▼23.5%
18.	DEN	Aalborg Airport	Aalborg	AAL/EKYT	1,395,718	Steady	▲7.2%
19.	SWE	Luleå Airport	Luleå	LLA/ESPA	1,140,244	Steady	▲3.1%
20.	NOR	Ålesund Airport Vigra	Ålesund	AES/ENAL	1,119,860	Steady	▲4.0%
21.	NOR	Kristiansand Airport Kjevik	Kristiansand S.	KRS/ENCN	1,072,025	Steady	▲0.5%
22.	SWE	Umeå Airport	Umeå	UME/ESNU	1,042,891	Steady	▲5.5%
23.	FIN	Oulu Airport	Oulu	OUL/EFOU	960,547	Steady	▲9.5%
24.	SWE	Göteborg City Airport	Gothenburg	GSE/ESGP	757,735	Steady	▼12.2%
25.	NOR	Harstad/Narvik Airport Evenes	Harstad/Narvik	EVE/ENEV	705,874	▲1	▲7.8%
26.	NOR	Haugesund Airport Karmøy	Haugesund	HAU/ENHD	694,738	▼1	▼0.9%
27.	NOR	Molde Airport Årø	Molde	MOL/ENML	483,582	▲1	▲5.4%
28.	SWE	Åre Östersund Airport	Åre/Östersund	OSD/ESNZ	460,720	▲4	▲12.8%
29.	FIN	Rovaniemi Airport	Rovaniemi	RVN/EFRO	444,561	▲1	▲4.0%
30.	DEN	Aarhus Airport	Aarhus	AAR/EKAH	421,508	▼1	▼7.4%
31.	FIN	Tampere-Pirkkala Airport	Tampere	TMP/EFTP	412,609	▼4	▼11.6%
32.	SWE	Visby Airport	Visby	VBY/ESSV	406,906	▲4	▲15.5%
33.	SWE	Ängelholm Helsingborg Airport	Ängelholm/Helsingborg	AGH/ESTA	397,068	▼2	▼3.8%
34.	NOR	Kristiansund Airport Kvernberget	Kristiansund N.	KSU/ENKB	387,471	▼1	▼1.8%
35.	NOR	Alta Airport	Alta	ALF/ENAT	376,863	Steady	▲6.8%
36.	ISL	Reykjavík Airport	Reykjavík	RKV/BIRK	364,749	▼2	▼4.2%
37.	FIN	Vaasa Airport	Vaasa	VAA/EFVA	325,886	▲1	▲2.1%
38.	SWE	Skellefteå Airport	Skellefteå	SFT/ESNS	319,806	▲2	▲9.5%
39.	NOR	Kirkenes Airport Høybuktmoen	Kirkenes	KKN/ENKR	310,350	Steady	▲4.4%
40.	FIN	Turku Airport	Turku	TKU/EFTU	297,858	▼3	▼8.3%
41.	SWE	Sundsvall Airport	Sundsvall/Härnösand	SDL/ESNN	278,549	Steady	▲2.3%
42.	SWE	Kiruna Airport	Kiruna	KRN/ESNQ	270,738	▲3	▲19.8%
43.	FIN	Kuopio Airport	Kuopio	KUO/EFKU	260,364	▼1	▼0.3%
44.	FAE	Vágar Airport	Vágar/Faroe Islands	FAE/EKVG	250,287	Steady	▲6.0%
45.	DEN	Bornholm Airport	Rønne	RNN/EKRN	239,978	▲3	▲15.7%
46.	FIN	Kittilä Airport	Kittilä	KTT/EFKT	234,792	▼3	▼1.0%
47.	NOR	Bardufoss Airport	Bardufoss	BDU/ENDU	218,451	Steady	▲5.2%
48.	SWE	Ronneby Airport	Ronneby/Karlskrona	RNB/ESDF	215,192	▼2	▲0.9%
49.	SWE	Kalmar Airport	Kalmar	KLR/ESMQ	213,681	▲1	▲4.3%
50.	NOR	Florø Airport	Florø	FRO/ENFL	205,830	▼1	▲2.7%
51.	SWE	Växjö Småland Airport	Växjö/Alvesta	VXO/ESMX	178,640	▲1	▼0.4%
52.	ISL	Akureyri International Airport	Akureyri	AEY/BIAR	176,537	▼1	▼3.7%
53.	NOR	Hammerfest Airport	Hammerfest	HFT/ENHF	172,191	▲1	▲1.4%
54.	SJM	Svalbard Airport Longyear	Longyearbyen	LYR/ENSB	161,223	▲2	▲7.0%
55.	FIN	Ivalo Airport	Ivalo	IVL/EFIV	142,719	▲2	▼2.5%
56.	NOR	Brønnøysund Airport Brønnøy	Brønnøysund	BNN/ENBN	142,539	▼3	▼16.3%
57.	SWE	Linköping City Airport	Linköping	LPI/ESSL	139,542	▲4	▲19.7%
58.	FIN	Joensuu Airport	Joensuu	JOE/EFJO	138,219	▲1	▲5.3%
59.	SWE	Norrköping Airport	Norrköping	NRK/ESSP	131,826	▲8	▲20.8%
60.	DEN	Karup Airport	Karup	KRP/EKKA	126,470	▼2	▼7.0%
61.	SWE	Halmstad City Airport	Halmstad	HAD/ESMT	126,147	▲1	▲8.5%
62.	NOR	Ørsta–Volda Airport, Hovden	Ørsta/Volda	HOV/ENOV	123,637	▼2	▼0.7%
63.	DEN	Esbjerg Airport	Esbjerg	EBJ/EKEB	121,313	▲6	▲14.1%
64.	NOR	Mo i Rana Airport Røssvoll	Mo i Rana	MQN/ENRA	120,137	▼1	▲5.9%
65.	SWE	Stockholm-Västerås Airport	Västerås/Stockholm	VST/ESOW	117,390	▼10	▼28.3%
66.	NOR	Stokmarknes Airport Skagen	Stokmarknes	SKN/ENSK	107,262	▼1	▼3.4%
67.	NOR	Leknes Airport	Leknes	LKN/ENLK	106,497	▼3	▼5.7%
68.	NOR	Vadsø Airport	Vadsø	VDS/ENVD	101,756	▲7	▲12.2%
69.	NOR	Sandnessjøen Airport Stokka	Sandnessjøen	SSJ/ENST	97,445	▼1	▼9.3%
70.	SWE	Örebro Airport	Örebro	ORB/ESOE	96,256	Steady	▼5.3%
71.	SWE	Jönköping Airport	Jönköping	JKG/ESGJ	95,133	▲3	▲1.2%
72.	NOR	Sogndal Airport Haukåsen	Sogndal	SOG/ENSG	92,155	Steady	▼3.9%
73.	FIN	Lappeenranta Airport	Lappeenranta	LPP/EFLP	89,551	▼2	▼8.9%
74.	ISL	Egilsstaðir International Airport	Egilsstaðir	EGS/BIEG	89,186	▼1	▼5.3%
75.	NOR	Førde Airport Bringeland	Førde	FDE/ENBL	86,121	▲1	▼2.4%
76.	NOR	Mosjøen Airport Kjærstad	Mosjøen	MJF/ENMS	85,022	▲1	▼2.1%
77.	SWE	Örnsköldsvik Airport	Örnsköldsvik	OER/ESNO	84,088	▲1	▲4.9%
78.	SWE	Karlstad Airport	Karlstad	KSD/ESOK	83,288	▼12	▼24.0%
79.	NOR	Svolvær Airport Helle	Svolvær	SVJ/ENSH	78,205	▲3	▲16.8%
80.	FIN	Kuusamo Airport	Kuusamo	KAO/EFKS	73,432	▼1	▼1.5%
81.	FIN	Kajaani Airport	Kajaani	KAJ/EFKI	71,854	▼1	▼3.6%
82.	FIN	Kokkola-Pietarsaari Airport	Kokkola/Jakobstad	KOK/EFKK	68,669	▼1	▼0.5%
83.	NOR	Lakselv Airport Banak	Lakselv	LKL/ENNA	63,381	Steady	▼2.8%
84.	FIN	Kemi-Tornio Airport	Kemi/Tornio	KEM/EFKE	59,040	▲1	▲2.4%
85.	NOR	Andøya Airport Andenes	Andenes	ANX/ENAN	58,856	▼1	▼7.1%
86.	DEN	Sønderborg Airport	Sønderborg	SGD/EKSB	57,732	▲6	▲35.5%
87.	FIN	Jyväskylä Airport	Jyväskylä	JYV/EFJY	55,706	▲1	▲10.2%
88.	ALA	Mariehamn Airport	Mariehamn	MHQ/EFMA	52,097	▼2	▼0.8%
89.	SWE	Arvidsjaur Airport	Arvidsjaur	AJR/ESNX	50,936	▼2	▼0.2%
90.	NOR	Rørvik Airport Ryum	Rørvik	RVK/ENRM	49,664	▼1	▲2.7%
91.	NOR	Namsos Airport	Namsos	OSY/ENNM	46,118	Steady	▲4.0%
92.	SWE	Trollhättan-Vänersborg Airport	Trollhättan/Vänersborg	THN/ESGT	44,226	▲1	▲4.0%
93.	NOR	Sandane Airport Anda	Sandane	SDN/ENSD	43,067	▼3	▼7.3%
94.	SWE	Lapland Airport	Gällivare	GEV/ESNG	40,908	Steady	▲2.2%
95.	SWE	Kristianstad Airport	Kristianstad	KID/ESMK	39,411	▲3	▲20.6%
96.	NOR	Stord Airport Sørstokken	Leirvik	SRP/ENSO	38,242		
97.	SWE	Dala Airport	Borlänge/Falun	BLE/ESSD	34,232	▼2	▼12.1%
98.	NOR	Skien Airport	Skien	SKE/ENSN	33,080	▼2	▼8.5%
99.	NOR	Vardø Airport Svartnes	Vardø	VAW/ENSS	30,786		
100.	NOR	Narvik Airport Framnes	Narvik	NVK/ENNK	27,197	▼1	▼6.3%

Out of date statistics for airports without data from 2014 (with at least 20,000 passengers)
Rank	Country	Airport	City/town/village	Code (IATA/ICAO)	Total passengers	Year
	GRL	Kangerlussuaq Airport	Kangerlussuaq	SFJ/BGSF	134,831	2014
	GRL	Nuuk Airport	Nuuk	GOH/BGGH	68,951	2014
	GRL	Ilulissat Airport	Ilulissat	JAV/BGJN	39,703	2014
	ISL	Ísafjörður Airport	Ísafjörður	IFJ/BIIS	35,577	2013
	GRL	Narsarsuaq Airport	Narsarsuaq	UAK/BGBW	23,360	2014
	GRL	Sisimiut Airport	Sisimiut	JHS/BGSS	20,085	2014

Some airports that might enter top 100 in 2015 (at least 20,000) or have left it in 2014
Rank	Country	Airport	City/town/village	Code (IATA/ICAO)	Total passengers (2014)
	FIN	Pori Airport	Pori	POR/EFPO	24,983
	DEN	Roskilde Airport	Roskilde/Copenhagen	RKE/EKRK	24,082
	SWE	Lycksele Airport	Lycksele	LYC/ESNL	21,069

==== International and domestic ====
International passengers 2014
Rank	Country	Airport	City/town/village	Code (IATA/ICAO)	Total passengers
1.	DEN	Copenhagen Airport	Copenhagen	CPH/EKCH	23,680,303
2.	SWE	Stockholm Arlanda Airport	Stockholm	ARN/ESSA	17,328,325
3.	FIN	Helsinki Airport	Helsinki	HEL/EFHK	13,441,567
4.	NOR	Oslo Airport	Oslo	OSL/ENGM	13,361,608
5.	SWE	Göteborg Landvetter Airport	Gothenburg	GOT/ESGG	3,846,032

Domestic passengers 2014
Rank	Country	Airport	City/town/village	Code (IATA/ICAO)	Total passengers
1.	NOR	Oslo Airport	Oslo	OSL/ENGM	10,907,544
2.	SWE	Stockholm Arlanda Airport	Stockholm	ARN/ESSA	5,090,824
3.	NOR	Bergen Airport Flesland	Bergen	BGO/ENBR	3,669,600
4.	NOR	Trondheim Airport Værnes	Trondheim	TRD/ENVA	3,427,690
5.	FIN	Helsinki Airport	Helsinki	HEL/EFHK	2,507,193

=== 2013 statistics ===
Rank	Country	Airport	City/town/village	Code (IATA/ICAO)	Total passengers	Rank change	Change 2012–2013
1.	DEN	Copenhagen Airport	Copenhagen	CPH/EKCH	24,066,917	Steady	▲3.1%
2.	NOR	Oslo Airport	Oslo	OSL/ENGM	22,956,544	Steady	▲4.0%
3.	SWE	Stockholm Arlanda Airport	Stockholm	ARN/ESSA	20,673,810	Steady	▲5.1%
4.	FIN	Helsinki Airport	Helsinki	HEL/EFHK	15,279,043	Steady	▲2.8%
5.	NOR	Bergen Airport Flesland	Bergen	BGO/ENBR	6,213,960	Steady	▲6.9%
6.	SWE	Göteborg Landvetter Airport	Gothenburg	GOT/ESGG	4,998,526	Steady	▲3.0%
7.	NOR	Stavanger Airport Sola	Stavanger	SVG/ENZV	4,668,403	Steady	▲5.8%
8.	NOR	Trondheim Airport Værnes	Trondheim	TRD/ENVA	4,311,328	Steady	▲3.6%
9.	ISL	Keflavík International Airport	Keflavík/Reykjavík	KEF/BIKF	3,209,848	Steady	▲16.1%
10.	DEN	Billund Airport	Billund	BLL/EKBI	2,829,016	Steady	▲3.5%
11.	SWE	Bromma Stockholm Airport	Stockholm	BMA/ESSB	2,277,567	▲1	▼0.7%
12.	SWE	Stockholm Skavsta Airport	Nyköping/Stockholm	NYO/ESKN	2,165,040	▼1	▼6.6%
13.	SWE	Malmö Airport	Malmö	MMX/ESMS	2,124,682	Steady	▲1.0%
14.	NOR	Tromsø Airport Langnes	Tromsø	TOS/ENTC	1,935,419	Steady	▲2.5%
15.	NOR	Moss Airport Rygge	Oslo/Moss	RYG/ENRY	1,890,889	Steady	▲9.2%
16.	NOR	Torp Sandefjord Airport	Sandefjord	TRF/ENTO	1,856,300	▲1	▲8.8%
17.	NOR	Bodø Airport	Bodø	BOO/ENBO	1,669,191	▼1	▼3.6%
18.	DEN	Aalborg Airport	Aalborg	AAL/EKYT	1,302,053	Steady	▼0.5%
19.	SWE	Luleå Airport	Luleå	LLA/ESPA	1,105,680	Steady	▲1.4%
20.	NOR	Ålesund Airport Vigra	Ålesund	AES/ENAL	1,077,209	▲2	▲7.6%
21.	NOR	Kristiansand Airport Kjevik	Kristiansand S.	KRS/ENCN	1,066,702	Steady	▲4.7%
22.	SWE	Umeå Airport	Umeå	UME/ESNU	988,406	▲1	▲0.4%
23.	FIN	Oulu Airport	Oulu	OUL/EFOU	877,080	▼3	▼18.7%
24.	SWE	Göteborg City Airport	Gothenburg	GSE/ESGP	863,140	Steady	▲6.9%
25.	NOR	Haugesund Airport Karmøy	Haugesund	HAU/ENHD	701,326	Steady	▲5.6%
26.	NOR	Harstad/Narvik Airport Evenes	Harstad/Narvik	EVE/ENEV	654,977	Steady	▲6.2%
27.	FIN	Tampere-Pirkkala Airport	Tampere	TMP/EFTP	466,671	Steady	▼18.2%
28.	NOR	Molde Airport Årø	Molde	MOL/ENML	459,013	▲2	▲2.5%
29.	DEN	Aarhus Airport	Aarhus	AAR/EKAH	455,405	▼1	▼2.6%
30.	FIN	Rovaniemi Airport	Rovaniemi	RVN/EFRO	427,367	▲3	▲5.8%
31.	SWE	Ängelholm Helsingborg Airport	Ängelholm/Helsingborg	AGH/ESTA	412,852	▲1	▲2.1%
32.	SWE	Åre Östersund Airport	Åre/Östersund	OSD/ESNZ	408,480	▲3	▲6.5%
33.	NOR	Kristiansund Airport Kvernberget	Kristiansund N.	KSU/ENKB	394,644	▲1	▲2.2%
34.	ISL	Reykjavík Airport	Reykjavík	RKV/BIRK	380,770	▼3	▼7.2%
35.	NOR	Alta Airport	Alta	ALF/ENAT	353,031	▲2	▲2.3%
36.	SWE	Visby Airport	Visby	VBY/ESSV	352,226	▲2	▲7.6%
37.	FIN	Turku Airport	Turku	TKU/EFTU	324,667	▼8	▼28.6%
38.	FIN	Vaasa Airport	Vaasa	VAA/EFVA	319,315	▼2	▼14.7%
39.	NOR	Kirkenes Airport Høybuktmoen	Kirkenes	KKN/ENKR	297,149	Steady	▼1.2%
40.	SWE	Skellefteå Airport	Skellefteå	SFT/ESNS	292,005	Steady	0.0%
41.	SWE	Sundsvall Härnösand Airport	Sundsvall/Härnösand	SDL/ESNN	272,362	▲1	▼3.6%
42.	FIN	Kuopio Airport	Kuopio	KUO/EFKU	261,151	▼1	▼7.7%
43.	FIN	Kittilä Airport	Kittilä	KTT/EFKT	237,222	Steady	▼9.9%
44.	FAE	Vagar Airport	Vágar/Faroe Islands	FAE/EKVG	236,181	Steady	▲4.7%
45.	SWE	Kiruna Airport	Kiruna	KRN/ESNQ	226,003	▲3	▲14.1%
46.	SWE	Ronneby Airport	Ronneby/Karlskrona	RNB/ESDF	213,364	▼1	▼2.6%
47.	NOR	Bardufoss Airport	Bardufoss	BDU/ENDU	207,650	Steady	▲1.9%
48.	DEN	Bornholm Airport	Rønne	RNN/EKRN	207,361	▲4	▲15.1%
49.	NOR	Florø Airport	Florø	FRO/ENFL	206,694	▲1	▲10.4%
50.	SWE	Kalmar Airport	Kalmar	KLR/ESMQ	204,828	▲1	▲10.4%
51.	ISL	Akureyri International Airport	Akureyri	AEY/BIAR	183,245	▼5	▼11.3%
52.	SWE	Växjö Småland Airport	Växjö/Alvesta	VXO/ESMX	179,413	▼3	▼7.7%
53.	NOR	Brønnøysund Airport Brønnøy	Brønnøysund	BNN/ENBN	170,370	▲1	▲0.8%
54.	NOR	Hammerfest Airport	Hammerfest	HFT/ENHF	169,883	▲2	▲13.7%
55.	SWE	Stockholm-Västerås Airport	Västerås/Stockholm	VST/ESOW	163,773	Steady	▲0.2%
56.	SJM	Svalbard Airport Longyear	Longyearbyen	LYR/ENSB	150,672	▲3	▲12.0%
57.	FIN	Ivalo Airport	Ivalo	IVL/EFIV	146,314	▲1	▲0.6%
58.	DEN	Karup Airport	Karup	KRP/EKKA	136,007	▼5	▼21.7%
59.	FIN	Joensuu Airport	Joensuu	JOE/EFJO	131,291	▼2	▼10.2%
60.	NOR	Ørsta–Volda Airport, Hovden	Ørsta/Volda	HOV/ENOV	124,555	▲2	▲7.2%
61.	SWE	Linköping City Airport	Linköping	LPI/ESSL	116,567	▲2	▲0.8%
62.	SWE	Halmstad City Airport	Halmstad	HAD/ESMT	116,219	▲11	▲21.5%
63.	NOR	Mo i Rana Airport Røssvoll	Mo i Rana	MQN/ENRA	113,492	▲2	▲3.0%
64.	NOR	Leknes Airport	Leknes	LKN/ENLK	112,927	▲4	▲8.6%
65.	NOR	Stokmarknes Airport Skagen	Stokmarknes	SKN/ENSK	111,089	▼4	▼5.0%
66.	SWE	Karlstad Airport	Karlstad	KSD/ESOK	109,574	▲3	▲9.2%
67.	SWE	Norrköping Airport	Norrköping	NRK/ESSP	109,160	▼3	▼1.7%
68.	NOR	Sandnessjøen Airport Stokka	Sandnessjøen	SSJ/ENST	107,485	▼2	▲0.8%
69.	DEN	Esbjerg Airport	Esbjerg	EBJ/EKEB	106,280	▲6	▲15.1%
70.	SWE	Örebro Airport	Örebro	ORB/ESOE	101,682	▲1	▲3.1%
71.	FIN	Lappeenranta Airport	Lappeenranta	LPP/EFLP	98,300	▲3	▲4.8%
72.	NOR	Sogndal Airport Haukåsen	Sogndal	SOG/ENSG	95,934	Steady	▼0.1%
73.	ISL	Egilsstaðir International Airport	Egilsstaðir	EGS/BIEG	94,162	▼3	▼5.2%
74.	SWE	Jönköping Airport	Jönköping	JKG/ESGJ	93,993	▲9	▲21.0%
75.	NOR	Vadsø Airport	Vadsø	VDS/ENVD	90,721	▼8	▼13.4%
76.	NOR	Førde Airport Bringeland	Førde	FDE/ENBL	88,260	Steady	▼2.0%
77.	NOR	Mosjøen Airport Kjærstad	Mosjøen	MJF/ENMS	86,803	Steady	▼0.6%
78.	SWE	Örnsköldsvik Airport	Örnsköldsvik	OER/ESNO	80,123	▲2	▼6.4%
79.	FIN	Kuusamo Airport	Kuusamo	KAO/EFKS	74,583	Steady	▼13.8%
80.	FIN	Kajaani Airport	Kajaani	KAJ/EFKI	74,558	▲2	▼4.5%
81.	FIN	Kokkola-Pietarsaari Airport	Kokkola/Jakobstad	KOK/EFKK	68,991	▼3	▼20.8%
82.	NOR	Svolvær Airport Helle	Svolvær	SVJ/ENSH	66,965	▼1	▼16.5%
83.	NOR	Lakselv Airport Banak	Lakselv	LKL/ENNA	65,234	▲1	▼13.5%
84.	NOR	Andøya Airport Andenes	Andenes	ANX/ENAN	63,372	▲4	▲10.4%
85.	FIN	Kemi-Tornio Airport	Kemi/Tornio	KEM/EFKE	57,681	▲1	▼12.3%
86.	ALA	Mariehamn Airport	Mariehamn	MHQ/EFMA	52,514	▲3	▼4.2%
87.	SWE	Arvidsjaur Airport	Arvidsjaur	AJR/ESNX	51,029	▲4	▲5.5%
88.	FIN	Jyväskylä Airport	Jyväskylä	JYV/EFJY	50,570	▼1	▼22.5%
89.	NOR	Rørvik Airport Ryum	Rørvik	RVK/ENRM	48,341	▲4	▲9.1%
90.	NOR	Sandane Airport Anda	Sandane	SDN/ENSD	46,474	Steady	▼4.6%
91.	NOR	Namsos Airport	Namsos	OSY/ENNM	44,325	▲1	▼0.9%
92.	DEN	Sønderborg Airport	Sønderborg	SGD/EKSB	42,613	▲6	▲11.4%
93.	SWE	Trollhättan-Vänersborg Airport	Trollhättan/Vänersborg	THN/ESGT	42,522	▲1	▼2.8%
94.	SWE	Lapland Airport	Gällivare	GEV/ESNG	40,046	▲1	▼5.4%
95.	SWE	Dala Airport	Borlänge/Falun	BLE/ESSD	38,950	▲3	▼0.9%
96.	NOR	Skien Airport	Skien	SKE/ENSN	36,171	▲5	▲2.5%
97.	ISL	Ísafjörður Airport	Ísafjörður	IFJ/BIIS	35,577	Steady	▼11.8%
98.	SWE	Kristianstad Airport	Kristianstad	KID/ESMK	32,686	▲12	▲35.3%
99.	NOR	Narvik Airport Framnes	Narvik	NVK/ENNK	29,034	▲4	▼9.6%
100.	DEN	Roskilde Airport	Roskilde/Copenhagen	RKE/EKRK	28,965	▲4	▼2.8%

Unsourced statistics for 2013 (for airports with at least 30,000 passengers)
Rank	Country	Airport	City/town/village	Code (IATA/ICAO)	Total passengers	Year
	GRL	Kangerlussuaq Airport	Kangerlussuaq	SFJ/BGSF	136,188	2013
	GRL	Nuuk Airport	Nuuk	GOH/BGGH	69,732	2013
	GRL	Ilulissat Airport	Ilulissat	JAV/BGJN	40,241	2013
But there is a source saying 159432 passengers for Kangerlussuaq+Narsarsuaq, and 193812 for the other Greenlandic airports together

=== 2012 statistics ===
Rank	Country	Airport	City/town/village	Code (IATA/ICAO)	Total passengers	Rank change	Change 2011–2012
1.	DEN	Copenhagen Airport	Copenhagen	CPH/EKCH	23,334,939	Steady	▲2.7%
2.	NOR	Oslo Airport	Oslo	OSL/ENGM	22,080,433	Steady	▲4.6%
3.	SWE	Stockholm Arlanda Airport	Stockholm	ARN/ESSA	19,677,765	Steady	▲3.3%
4.	FIN	Helsinki Airport	Helsinki	HEL/EFHK	14,858,215	Steady	▼0.1%
5.	NOR	Bergen Airport Flesland	Bergen	BGO/ENBR	5,814,413	Steady	▲3.8%
6.	SWE	Göteborg Landvetter Airport	Gothenburg	GOT/ESGG	4,854,162	Steady	▼0.9%
7.	NOR	Stavanger Airport Sola	Stavanger	SVG/ENZV	4,413,987	Steady	▲6.8%
8.	NOR	Trondheim Airport Værnes	Trondheim	TRD/ENVA	4,160,162	Steady	▲6.0%
9.	ISL	Keflavík International Airport	Keflavík/Reykjavík	KEF/BIKF	2,764,026	▲3	▲11.7%
10.	DEN	Billund Airport	Billund	BLL/EKBI	2,734,807	▼1	▲0.9%
11.	SWE	Stockholm Skavsta Airport	Nyköping/Stockholm	NYO/ESKN	2,317,589	▼1	▼10.2%
12.	SWE	Bromma Stockholm Airport	Stockholm	BMA/ESSB	2,293,500	▼1	▲5.2%
13.	SWE	Malmö Airport	Malmö	MMX/ESMS	2,104,359	Steady	▲8.2%
14.	NOR	Tromsø Airport Langnes	Tromsø	TOS/ENTC	1,889,023	Steady	▲4.9%
15.	NOR	Moss Airport Rygge	Oslo	RYG/ENRY	1,732,039	▲1	▲3.9%
16.	NOR	Bodø Airport	Bodø	BOO/ENBO	1,730,656	▼1	▼0.4%
17.	NOR	Torp Sandefjord Airport	Sandefjord	TRF/ENTO	1,706,064	▲1	▲26.4%
18.	DEN	Aalborg Airport	Aalborg	AAL/EKYT	1,308,593	▼1	▼5.1%
19.	SWE	Luleå Airport	Luleå	LLA/ESPA	1,089,982	Steady	▲2.2%
20.	FIN	Oulu Airport	Oulu	OUL/EFOU	1,078,533	Steady	▲10.7%
21.	NOR	Kristiansand Airport Kjevik	Kristiansand S.	KRS/ENCN	1,019,291	▲1	▲6.9%
22.	NOR	Ålesund Airport Vigra	Ålesund	AES/ENAL	1,001,387	▲1	▲7.9%
23.	SWE	Umeå Airport	Umeå	UME/ESNU	984,771	▼2	▲3.0%
24.	SWE	Göteborg City Airport	Gothenburg	GSE/ESGP	807,763	Steady	▲4.5%
25.	NOR	Haugesund Airport Karmøy	Haugesund	HAU/ENHD	664,375	▲1	▲9.8%
26.	NOR	Harstad/Narvik Airport Evenes	Harstad/Narvik	EVE/ENEV	616,453	▲1	▲3.1%
27.	FIN	Tampere-Pirkkala Airport	Tampere	TMP/EFTP	570,739	▼2	▼13.2%
28.	DEN	Aarhus Airport	Aarhus	AAR/EKAH	467,681	Steady	▼20.9%
29.	FIN	Turku Airport	Turku	TKU/EFTU	454,948	▲5	▲20.5%
30.	NOR	Molde Airport Årø	Molde	MOL/ENML	447,844	▼1	▲2.1%
31.	ISL	Reykjavík Airport	Reykjavík	RKV/BIRK	410,341	▼1	▼4.6%
32.	SWE	Ängelholm Helsingborg Airport	Ängelholm/Helsingborg	AGH/ESTA	404,434	Steady	▲1.9%
33.	FIN	Rovaniemi Airport	Rovaniemi	RVN/EFRO	403,892	▼2	▲1.8%
34.	NOR	Kristiansund Airport Kvernberget	Kristiansund N.	KSU/ENKB	386,138	▲1	▲6.3%
35.	SWE	Åre Östersund Airport	Åre/Östersund	OSD/ESNZ	383,434	▼2	▲1.5%
36.	FIN	Vaasa Airport	Vaasa	VAA/EFVA	374,139	▲2	▲10.5%
37.	NOR	Alta Airport	Alta	ALF/ENAT	345,073	▼1	▲0.1%
38.	SWE	Visby Airport	Visby	VBY/ESSV	327,312	▼1	▼3.9%
39.	NOR	Kirkenes Airport Høybuktmoen	Kirkenes	KKN/ENKR	300,843	Steady	▼0.1%
40.	SWE	Skellefteå Airport	Skellefteå	SFT/ESNS	292,081	▲3	▲5.1%
41.	FIN	Kuopio Airport	Kuopio	KUO/EFKU	282,900	Steady	▼0.5%
42.	SWE	Sundsvall Härnösand Airport	Sundsvall/Härnösand	SDL/ESNN	282,645	Steady	▲0.1%
43.	FIN	Kittilä Airport	Kittilä	KTT/EFKT	263,386	▲1	▲10.4%
44.	FAE	Vagar Airport	Vágar/Faroe Islands	FAE/EKVG	225,532	▲4	▲10.9%
45.	SWE	Ronneby Airport	Ronneby/Karlskrona	RNB/ESDF	218,965	▲1	▼3.8%
46.	ISL	Akureyri International Airport	Akureyri	AEY/BIAR	206,536	▲1	▼2.6%
47.	NOR	Bardufoss Airport	Bardufoss	BDU/ENDU	203,809	▲2	▲4.7%
48.	SWE	Kiruna Airport	Kiruna	KRN/ESNQ	198,073	▲5	▲20.7%
49.	SWE	Växjö Småland Airport	Växjö/Alvesta	VXO/ESMX	194,350	▲1	▲7.6%
50.	NOR	Florø Airport	Florø	FRO/ENFL	187,148	▲2	▲12.6%
51.	SWE	Kalmar Airport	Kalmar	KLR/ESMQ	185,530	Steady	▲4.9%
52.	DEN	Bornholm Airport	Rønne	RNN/EKRN	180,114	▼7	▼24.0%
53.	DEN	Karup Airport	Karup	KRP/EKKA	173,736	▼13	▼40.8%
54.	NOR	Brønnøysund Airport Brønnøy	Brønnøysund	BNN/ENBN	169,096	Steady	▲6.9%
55.	SWE	Stockholm-Västerås Airport	Västerås/Stockholm	VST/ESOW	163,472	Steady	▲8.8%
56.	NOR	Hammerfest Airport	Hammerfest	HFT/ENHF	149,435	Steady	▲1.5%
57.	FIN	Joensuu Airport	Joensuu	JOE/EFJO	146,197	▲2	▲24.8%
58.	FIN	Ivalo Airport	Ivalo	IVL/EFIV	145,455	Steady	▲15.9%
59.	SJM	Svalbard Airport Longyear	Longyearbyen	LYR/ENSB	134,533	▼2	▲6.5%
60.	GRL	Kangerlussuaq Airport	Kangerlussuaq	SFJ/BGSF	133,381	▲2	?%
61.	NOR	Stokmarknes Airport Skagen	Stokmarknes	SKN/ENSK	116,944	▲2	▲3.2%
62.	NOR	Ørsta–Volda Airport, Hovden	Ørsta/Volda	HOV/ENOV	116,189	▲9	▲14.6%
63.	SWE	Linköping City Airport	Linköping	LPI/ESSL	115,596	▲6	▲12.1%
64.	SWE	Norrköping Airport	Norrköping	NRK/ESSP	111,009	▼2	▼2.7%
65.	NOR	Mo i Rana Airport Røssvoll	Mo i Rana	MQN/ENRA	110,170	▼1	▼1.7%
66.	NOR	Sandnessjøen Airport Stokka	Sandnessjøen	SSJ/ENST	106,599	▲6	▲6.0%
67.	NOR	Vadsø Airport	Vadsø	VDS/ENVD	104,732	▼1	▼2.7%
68.	NOR	Leknes Airport	Leknes	LKN/ENLK	103,999	Steady	▼0.0%
69.	SWE	Karlstad Airport	Karlstad	KSD/ESOK	100,349	▼4	▼7.8%
70.	ISL	Egilsstaðir International Airport	Egilsstaðir	EGS/BIEG	99,278	Steady	▼2.1%
71.	SWE	Örebro Airport	Örebro	ORB/ESOE	98,594	▲11	▲18.9%
72.	NOR	Sogndal Airport Haukåsen	Sogndal	SOG/ENSG	96,031	▲3	▲2.5%
73.	SWE	Halmstad City Airport	Halmstad	HAD/ESMT	95,655	▼6	▼8.7%
74.	FIN	Lappeenranta Airport	Lappeenranta	LPP/EFLP	93,762	▼13	▼19.4%
75.	DEN	Esbjerg Airport	Esbjerg	EBJ/EKEB	92,314	▲3	▲3.9%
76.	NOR	Førde Airport Bringeland	Førde	FDE/ENBL	90,049	▲4	▲4.1%
77.	NOR	Mosjøen Airport Kjærstad	Mosjøen	MJF/ENMS	87,333	▲4	▲3.5%
78.	FIN	Kokkola-Pietarsaari Airport	Kokkola/Jakobstad	KOK/EFKK	87,076	▼5	▼8.0%
79.	FIN	Kuusamo Airport	Kuusamo	KAO/EFKS	86,486	▼3	▼5.7%
80.	SWE	Örnsköldsvik Airport	Örnsköldsvik	OER/ESNO	85,591	▼3	▼5.8%
81.	NOR	Svolvær Airport Helle	Svolvær	SVJ/ENSH	80,181	▲3	▼2.1%
82.	FIN	Kajaani Airport	Kajaani	KAJ/EFKI	77,852	▲3	▼0.3%
83.	SWE	Jönköping Airport	Jönköping	JKG/ESGJ	77,670	Steady	▼6.2%
84.	NOR	Lakselv Airport Banak	Lakselv	LKL/ENNA	75,423	▲3	▲12.9%
85.	GRL	Nuuk Airport	Nuuk	GOH/BGGH	69,324	▼11	▼5.0%
86.	FIN	Kemi-Tornio Airport	Kemi/Tornio	KEM/EFKE	65,761	▼11	▼29.9%
87.	FIN	Jyväskylä Airport	Jyväskylä	JYV/EFJY	65,220	▼7	▼26.6%
88.	NOR	Andøya Airport Andenes	Andenes	ANX/ENAN	57,423	▲3	▲9.6%
89.	ALA	Mariehamn Airport	Mariehamn	MHQ/EFMA	54,797	▲1	▲2.3%
90.	NOR	Sandane Airport Anda	Sandane	SDN/ENSD	48,724	▲4	▲8.3%
91.	SWE	Arvidsjaur Airport	Arvidsjaur	AJR/ESNX	48,391	▲1	▼1.9%
92.	NOR	Namsos Airport	Namsos	TRD/ENNM	44,728	▲4	▲5.5%
93.	NOR	Rørvik Airport Ryum	Rørvik	RVK/ENRM	44,300	▲6	▲9.0%
94.	SWE	Trollhättan-Vänersborg Airport	Trollhättan/Vänersborg	THN/ESGT	43,764	▲1	▲0.6%
95.	SWE	Lapland Airport	Gällivare	GEV/ESNG	42,351	▲3	▲0.4%
96.	GRL	Ilulissat Airport	Ilulissat	JAV/BGJN	41,965	▲3	▲11.8%
97.	ISL	Ísafjörður Airport	Ísafjörður	IFJ/BIIS	40,331	▲1	▼4.6%
98.	SWE	Dala Airport	Borlänge/Falun	BLE/ESSD	39,319	▲5	▲8.1%
99.	DEN	Sønderborg Airport	Sønderborg	SGD/EKSB	38,262	▼11	▼46.9%
100.	FIN	Pori Airport	Pori	POR/EFPO	35,313	▼10	▼34.7%

== Aircraft movements ==
Note: The statistics provided below do not include any movements by aircraft registered as military or touch and goes.

=== 2012 statistics ===
Rank	Country	Airport	City/town/village	Code (IATA/ICAO)	Total movements	Rank change	Change 2011–2012
1.	DEN	Copenhagen Airport	Copenhagen	CPH/EKCH	242,746	Steady	▼4.3%
2.	NOR	Oslo Airport	Oslo	OSL/ENGM	236,925	Steady	▲2.8%
3.	SWE	Stockholm Arlanda Airport	Stockholm	ARN/ESSA	209,704	Steady	▼1.4%
4.	FIN	Helsinki Airport	Helsinki	HEL/EFHK	172,232	Steady	▼10.6%
5.	NOR	Bergen Airport Flesland	Bergen	BGO/ENBR	103,481	Steady	▲0.3%
6.	NOR	Stavanger Airport Sola	Stavanger	SVG/ENZV	86,158	Steady	▲5.0%
7.	DEN	Roskilde Airport	Roskilde/Copenhagen	RKE/EKRK	72,019	▲2	▲11.0%
8.	SWE	Bromma Stockholm Airport	Stockholm	BMA/ESSB	66,612	Steady	▲0.5%
9.	NOR	Trondheim Airport Værnes	Trondheim	TRD/ENVA	60,987	▲1	▲5.3%
10.	SWE	Göteborg Landvetter Airport	Gothenburg	GOT/ESGG	60,802	▼3	▼12.5%
11.	ISL	Keflavík International Airport	Keflavík/Reykjavík	KEF/BIKF	57,873	▲2	▲6.7%
12.	ISL	Reykjavík Airport	Reykjavík	RKV/BIRK	52,228	▼1	▼6.6%
13.	DEN	Billund Airport	Billund	BLL/EKBI	50,719	▲1	▼4.5%
14.	SWE	Göteborg City Airport	Gothenburg	GSE/ESGP	48,968	▼2	▼11.6%
15.	NOR	Bodø Airport	Bodø	BOO/ENBO	43,507	Steady	▼0.0%
16.	NOR	Tromsø Airport Langnes	Tromsø	TOS/ENTC	40,439	▲1	▲2.4%
17.	NOR	Torp Sandefjord Airport	Sandefjord	TRF/ENTO	39,793	▲1	▲11.2%
18.	SWE	Malmö Airport	Malmö	MMX/ESMS	37,044	▼2	▼6.3%
19.	SWE	Stockholm Skavsta Airport	Nyköping/Stockholm	NYO/ESKN	31,804	▲1	▼1.2%
20.	FIN	Helsinki-Malmi Airport	Helsinki	HEM/EFHF	29,650	▼1	▼8.5%
21.	DEN	Aalborg Airport	Aalborg	AAL/EKYT	23,750	▲1	▼7.7%
22.	SWE	Umeå Airport	Umeå	UME/ESNU	23,096	▲2	▲0.2%
23.	NOR	Moss Airport Rygge	Moss/Oslo	RYG/ENRY	22,093	▲2	▼1.5%
24.	FIN	Turku Airport	Turku	TKU/EFTU	21,264	▲2	▼1.9%
25.	SWE	Stockholm-Västerås Airport	Västerås/Stockholm	VST/ESOW	19,798	▼4	▼37.2%
26.	DEN	Aarhus Airport	Aarhus	AAR/EKAH	19,439	▼3	▼22.2%
27.	NOR	Kristiansand Airport Kjevik	Kristiansand S.	KRS/ENCN	18,911	▲3	▲3.7%
28.	FIN	Oulu Airport	Oulu	OUL/EFOU	17,448	Steady	▼12.4%
29.	SWE	Visby Airport	Visby	VBY/ESSV	17,236	▼2	▼13.7%
30.	SWE	Luleå Airport	Luleå	LLA/ESPA	17,220	▲1	▼2.7%
31.	FIN	Tampere-Pirkkala Airport	Tampere	TMP/EFTP	16,816	▼2	▼10.9%
32.	ISL	Akureyri International Airport	Akureyri	AEY/BIAR	15,390	▲6	▲11.5%
33.	SWE	Linköping City Airport	Linköping	LPI/ESSL	14,974	Steady	▼0.2%
34.	NOR	Ålesund Airport Vigra	Ålesund	AES/ENAL	14,911	▲3	▲7.3%
35.	DEN	Esbjerg Airport	Esbjerg	EBJ/EKEB	14,460	▲4	▲5.1%
36.	NOR	Kristiansund Airport Kvernberget	Kristiansund N.	KSU/ENKB	14,433	▼1	▲3.6%
37.	SWE	Norrköping Airport	Norrköping	NRK/ESSP	14,296	▼3	▼3.3%
38.	SWE	Jönköping Airport	Jönköping	JKG/ESGJ	13,882	▼6	▼19.2%
39.	SWE	Kalmar Airport	Kalmar	KLR/ESMQ	13,264	▼3	▼4.6%
40.	SWE	Ängelholm Helsingborg Airport	Ängelholm/Helsingborg	AGH/ESTA	12,426	▲4	▲15.7%
41.	NOR	Brønnøysund Airport Brønnøy	Brønnøysund	BNN/ENBN	12,053	▼1	▲2.1%
42.	NOR	Hammerfest Airport	Hammerfest	HFT/ENHF	11,364	▼1	▲2.1%
43.	FIN	Vaasa Airport	Vaasa	VAA/EFVA	10,934	▼1	▼0.9%
44.	NOR	Florø Airport	Florø	FRO/ENFL	10,465	▲7	▲14.6%
45.	SWE	Halmstad City Airport	Halmstad	HAD/ESMT	10,324	▲10	▲20.9%
46.	NOR	Alta Airport	Alta	ALF/ENAT	9,985	▼3	▼8.8%
47.	SWE	Sundsvall Härnösand Airport	Sundsvall/Härnösand	SDL/ESNN	9,840	▼1	▼1.7%
48.	NOR	Harstad/Narvik Airport Evenes	Harstad/Narvik	EVE/ENEV	9,587	▲4	▲7.8%
49.	NOR	Haugesund Airport Karmøy	Haugesund	HAU/ENHD	9,382	▲7	▲10.2%
50.	NOR	Molde Airport Årø	Molde	MOL/ENML	9,220	▼2	▼4.3%
51.	FIN	Pori Airport	Pori	POR/EFPO	9,206	▼7	▼13.2%
52.	SWE	Arvidsjaur Airport	Arvidsjaur	AJR/ESNX	9,122	▲13	▲32.7%
53.	NOR	Kirkenes Airport Høybuktmoen	Kirkenes	KKN/ENKR	8,963	Steady	▲2.6%
54.	SWE	Dala Airport	Borlänge/Falun	BLE/ESSD	8,860	▲3	▲8.3%
55.	SWE	Örebro Airport	Örebro	ORB/ESOE	8,646	▼1	▲0.9%
56.	FIN	Kuopio Airport	Kuopio	KUO/EFKU	8,610	▼7	▼8.9%
57.	SWE	Åre Östersund Airport	Åre/Östersund	OSD/ESNZ	8,328	▲1	▲6.1%
58.	SWE	Kiruna Airport	Kiruna	KRN/ESNQ	7,948	▲20	▲38.3%
59.	NOR	Mo i Rana Airport Røssvoll	Mo i Rana	MQN/ENRA	7,691	▲1	▼0.1%
60.	FIN	Rovaniemi Airport	Rovaniemi	RVN/EFRO	7,530	▲1	▼2.1%
61.	NOR	Førde Airport Bringeland	Førde	FDE/ENBL	7,137	▲7	▲7.2%
62.	NOR	Sandnessjøen Airport Stokka	Sandnessjøen	SSJ/ENST	7,058	▲4	▲5.2%
63.	SWE	Växjö Småland Airport	Växjö/Alvesta	VXO/ESMX	6,862	▼1	▼7.0%
64.	DEN	Karup Airport	Karup	KRP/EKKA	6,737	▼14	▼27.9%
65.	DEN	Bornholm Airport	Rønne	RNN/EKRN	6,736	▼6	▼14.0%
66.	SWE	Ronneby Airport	Ronneby/Karlskrona	RNB/ESDF	6,680	▼21	▼32.6%
67.	SJM	Svalbard Airport Longyear	Longyearbyen	LYR/ENSB	6,626	▲3	▲4.3%
68.	NOR	Skien Airport	Skien	SKE/ENSN	6,616	▼5	▼10.1%
69.	NOR	Vadsø Airport	Vadsø	VDS/ENVD	6,578	Steady	▼0.6%
70.	SWE	Trollhättan-Vänersborg Airport	Trollhättan/Vänersborg	THN/ESGT	6,552	▲10	▲20.0%
71.	SWE	Karlstad Airport	Karlstad	KSD/ESOK	6,546	▲1	▲5.6%
72.	ALA	Mariehamn Airport	Mariehamn	MHQ/EFMA	6,262	▼8	▼9.1%
73.	NOR	Stokmarknes Airport Skagen	Stokmarknes	SKN/ENSK	6,163	Steady	▲1.0%
74.	NOR	Mosjøen Airport Kjærstad	Mosjøen	MJF/ENMS	6,041	Steady	▲1.5%
75.	NOR	Sogndal Airport Haukåsen	Sogndal	SOG/ENSG	5,801	Steady	▼1.5%
76.	SWE	Skellefteå Airport	Skellefteå	SFT/ESNS	5,748	▼9	▼13.8%
77.	NOR	Leknes Airport	Leknes	LKN/ENLK	5,722	▲2	▲2.1%
78.	NOR	Notodden Airport Tuven	Notodden	NTB/ENNO	5,675	▲4	▲11.8%
79.	SWE	Kristianstad Airport	Kristianstad	KID/ESMK	5,456	▼3	▼7.2%
80.	NOR	Ørsta–Volda Airport, Hovden	Ørsta/Volda	HOV/ENOV	5,370	▲4	▲11.1%
81.	DEN	Sønderborg Airport	Sønderborg	SGD/EKSB	5,147	▼4	▼11.7%
82.	FAE	Vagar Airport	Vágar/Faroe Islands	FAE/EKVG	5,145	▲4	▲13.0%
83.	FIN	Jyväskylä Airport	Jyväskylä	JYV/EFJY	4,946	▼12	▼21.4%
84.	SWE	Lycksele Airport	Lycksele	LYC/ESNL	4,880	▼3	▼4.4%
85.	FIN	Joensuu Airport	Joensuu	JOE/EFJO	4,676	▲2	▲4.7%
86.	NOR	Svolvær Airport Helle	Svolvær	SVJ/ENSH	4,541	▼1	▼2.7%
87.	SWE	Örnsköldsvik Airport	Örnsköldsvik	OER/ESNO	4,290	▲1	▼1.5%
88.	ISL	Vestmannaeyjar Airport	Vestmannaeyjar	VEY/BIVM	4,136	▲1	▲2.8%
89.	FIN	Kokkola-Pietarsaari Airport	Kokkola/Jakobstad	KOK/EFKK	4,134	▼6	▼16.0%
90.	NOR	Bardufoss Airport	Bardufoss	BDU/ENDU	3,777	▲6	▲13.6%
91.	NOR	Namsos Airport	Namsos	TRD/ENNM	3,767	▲4	▲10.2%
92.	NOR	Lakselv Airport Banak	Lakselv	LKL/ENNA	3,699	▲1	▲3.8%
93.	ISL	Egilsstaðir International Airport	Egilsstaðir	EGS/BIEG	3,566	▲1	▲0.3%
94.	SWE	Lapland Airport	Gällivare	GEV/ESNG	3,316	▼3	▼15.5%
95.	NOR	Røros Airport	Røros	RRS/ENRO	3,246	▼3	▼14.8%
96.	NOR	Andøya Airport Andenes	Andøya	ANX/ENAN	3,189	▲1	▲2.0%
97.	DEN	Thisted Airport	Thisted	TED/EKTS	3,128	Steady	▲74.4%
98.	NOR	Rørvik Airport Ryum	Rørvik	RVK/ENRM	2,985	▼1	▲10.7%
99.	SWE	Mora Siljan Airport	Mora	MXX/ESKM	2,892	Steady	▼3.7%
100.	FIN	Kittilä Airport	Kittilä	KTT/EFKT	2,846	Steady	▼2.8%

== Freight and mail tonnes ==
Note: The statistics below are provided in metric tonnes with three decimal digits, i.e. with an accuracy of number of kilograms handled at each airport. The statistics do not include belly cargo transported on regular or charter passenger flights.

=== 2012 statistics ===
Rank	Country	Airport	City/town/village	Code (IATA/ICAO)	Total tonnes	Rank change	Change 2011–2012
1.	FIN	Helsinki Airport	Helsinki	HEL/EFHK	192,161.494	Steady	▲12.8%
2.	DEN	Copenhagen Airport	Copenhagen	CPH/EKCH	157,359.017	Steady	▲7.2%
3.	NOR	Oslo Airport	Oslo	OSL/ENGM	105,204.388	Steady	▲7.5%
4.	SWE	Stockholm Arlanda Airport	Stockholm	ARN/ESSA	74,656.039	Steady	▼12.0%
5.	ISL	Keflavík International Airport	Keflavík/Reykjavík	KEF/BIKF	38,986.000	▲1	▲6.3%
6.	SWE	Göteborg Landvetter Airport	Gothenburg	GOT/ESGG	36,533.204	▼1	▼16.3%
7.	SWE	Malmö Airport	Malmö	MMX/ESMS	27,571.000	Steady	▼16.9%
8.	DEN	Billund Airport	Billund	BLL/EKBI	14,665.357	Steady	▲1.3%
9.	FIN	Turku Airport	Turku	TKU/EFTU	8,011.953	Steady	▲2.0%
10.	NOR	Bergen Airport Flesland	Bergen	BGO/ENBR	6,747.425	Steady	▲0.5%
11.	SWE	Örebro Airport	Örebro	ORB/ESOE	6,415.779	Steady	▲9.3%
12.	SWE	Jönköping Airport	Jönköping	JKG/ESGJ	5,323.046	▲1	▼2.4%
13.	NOR	Trondheim Airport Værnes	Trondheim	TRD/ENVA	5,106.631	▲2	▲4.3%
14.	SWE	Stockholm-Västerås Airport	Västerås/Stockholm	VST/ESOW	5,063.880	▼2	▼11.7%
15.	SWE	Umeå Airport	Umeå	UME/ESNU	5,032.683	▲3	▲6.0%
16.	NOR	Stavanger Airport Sola	Stavanger	SVG/ENZV	4,153.074	▼2	▼17.2%
17.	NOR	Molde Airport Årø	Molde	MOL/ENML	2,933.177	Steady	▲4.8%
18.	NOR	Tromsø Airport Langnes	Tromsø	TOS/ENTC	2,621.612	Steady	▼5.2%
19.	SWE	Sundsvall Härnösand Airport	Sundsvall/Härnösand	SDL/ESNN	2,577.405	Steady	▲18.9%
20.	FIN	Oulu Airport	Oulu	OUL/EFOU	2,043.348	Steady	▼3.2%
21.	NOR	Bodø Airport	Bodø	BOO/ENBO	1,909.181	Steady	▼7.8%
22.	SWE	Luleå Airport	Luleå	LLA/ESPA	1,842.968	Steady	▲26.7%
23.	ALA	Mariehamn Airport	Mariehamn	MHQ/EFMA	1,415.996	▲4	▲84.0%
24.	ISL	Reykjavík Airport	Reykjavík	RKV/BIRK	1,047.100	▼1	▲3.2%
25.	SWE	Visby Airport	Visby	VBY/ESSV	750.389	▼1	▼8.1%
26.	NOR	Ålesund Airport Vigra	Ålesund	AES/ENAL	735.956	▲2	▲4.4%
27.	SWE	Karlstad Airport	Karlstad	KSD/ESOK	735.050	▼1	▼8.1%
28.	NOR	Kirkenes Airport Høybuktmoen	Kirkenes	KKN/ENKR	664.894	▲1	▼3.1%
29.	FAE	Vagar Airport	Vágar/Faroe Islands	FAE/EKVG	610.756	▲5	▲18.7%
30.	SJM	Svalbard Airport Longyear	Longyearbyen	LYR/ENSB	608.369	▼5	▼25.3%
31.	NOR	Harstad/Narvik Airport Evenes	Harstad/Narvik	EVE/ENEV	549.758	▲2	▲4.3%
32.	SWE	Lapland Airport	Gällivare	GEV/ESNG	504.038	Steady	▼5.7%
33.	SWE	Kiruna Airport	Kiruna	KRN/ESNQ	487.756	▼1	▼17.1%
34.	ISL	Akureyri International Airport	Akureyri	AEY/BIAR	478.800	▲4	▲13.6%
35.	NOR	Alta Airport	Alta	ALF/ENAT	450.743	▲4	▲16.2%
36.	FIN	Tampere-Pirkkala Airport	Tampere	TMP/EFTP	401.032	▼5	▼26.0%
37.	NOR	Lakselv Airport Banak	Lakselv	LKL/ENNA	330.131	▲3	▼9.1%
38.	NOR	Torp Sandefjord Airport	Sandefjord	TRF/ENTO	311.259	▼3	▼29.1%
39.	SWE	Bromma Stockholm Airport	Stockholm	BMA/ESSB	306.972	▼3	▼29.5%
40.	NOR	Kristiansand Airport Kjevik	Kristiansand S.	KRS/ENCN	283.146	▲1	▼14.5%
41.	NOR	Vadsø Airport	Vadsø	VDS/ENVD	273.064	▲2	▲1.5%
42.	SWE	Stockholm Skavsta Airport	Nyköping/Stockholm	NYO/ESKN	265.402	▲64	▲4757.3%
43.	NOR	Mosjøen Airport Kjærstad	Mosjøen	MJF/ENMS	243.092	▲1	▼5.0%
44.	NOR	Sandnessjøen Airport Stokka	Sandnessjøen	SSJ/ENST	239.395	▲3	▲3.9%
45.	NOR	Brønnøysund Airport Brønnøy	Brønnøysund	BNN/ENBN	235.269	▲5	▼16.7%
46.	NOR	Haugesund Airport Karmøy	Haugesund	HAU/ENHD	233.137	Steady	▼5.0%
47.	NOR	Hammerfest Airport	Hammerfest	HFT/ENHF	228.116	▼2	▼8.5%
48.	NOR	Kristiansund Airport Kvernberget	Kristiansund N.	KSU/ENKB	225.759	▲1	▲12.8%
49.	ISL	Egilsstaðir International Airport	Egilsstaðir	EGS/BIEG	200.400	▲2	▲3.9%
50.	NOR	Leknes Airport	Leknes	LKN/ENLK	188.054	▼2	▼13.8%
51.	NOR	Mo i Rana Airport Røssvoll	Mo i Rana	MQN/ENRA	183.860	▲1	▼7.8%
52.	NOR	Svolvær Airport Helle	Svolvær	SVJ/ENSH	183.857	▼2	▼7.8%
53.	FIN	Rovaniemi Airport	Rovaniemi	RVN/EFRO	144.221	▲1	▼17.3%
54.	NOR	Røros Airport	Røros	RRS/ENRO	135.917	▲3	▲11.0%
55.	FIN	Kuopio Airport	Kuopio	KUO/EFKU	109.571	▲22	▲244.4%
56.	DEN	Esbjerg Airport	Esbjerg	EBJ/EKEB	106.523	▼1	▼30.3%
57.	ISL	Ísafjörður Airport	Ísafjörður	IFJ/BIIS	102.100	▲1	▲2.2%
58.	DEN	Aalborg Airport	Aalborg	AAL/EKYT	95.758	▲18	▲195.8%
59.	SWE	Åre Östersund Airport	Åre/Östersund	OSD/ESNZ	94.221	▲1	▲25.7%
60.	SWE	Norrköping Airport	Norrköping	NRK/ESSP	81.950	▼1	▼8.4%
61.	ISL	Vestmannaeyjar Airport	Vestmannaeyjar	VEY/BIVM	80.700	Steady	▲10.9%
62.	SWE	Örnsköldsvik Airport	Örnsköldsvik	OER/ESNO	65.683	▼9	▼62.9%
63.	NOR	Bardufoss Airport	Bardufoss	BDU/ENDU	47.077	▲1	▼9.2%
64.	NOR	Florø Airport	Florø	FRO/ENFL	45.895	▲3	▼1.5%
65.	NOR	Båtsfjord Airport	Båtsfjord	BJF/ENBS	45.065	▲1	▼44.8%
66.	NOR	Stokmarknes Airport Skagen	Stokmarknes	SKN/ENSK	44.277	▲2	▲3.5%
67.	NOR	Førde Airport Bringeland	Førde	FDE/ENBL	40.009	▲2	▲3.4%
68.	FIN	Kajaani Airport	Kajaani	KAJ/EFKI	38.326	▼2	▼18.4%
69.	NOR	Honningsvåg Airport Valan	Honningsvåg	HVG/ENHV	35.712	▼4	▼24.8%
70.	ISL	Bíldudalur Airport	Bíldudalur	BIU/BIBD	35.400	▲1	▼5.3%
71.	ISL	Vopnafjörður Airport	Vopnafjörður	VPN/BIVO	34.100	▲8	▲9.3%
72.	FIN	Joensuu Airport	Joensuu	JOE/EFJO	33.092	▲1	▼6.5%
73.	NOR	Ørsta–Volda Airport, Hovden	Ørsta/Volda	HOV/ENOV	32.792	▲2	▼2.8%
74.	NOR	Berlevåg Airport	Berlevåg	BVG/ENBV	32.261	▼2	▼13.4%
75.	NOR	Værøy Heliport	Værøy	VRY/ENVR	31.997	▼1	▼9.3%
76.	NOR	Hasvik Airport	Hasvik	HAA/ENHK	31.174	▲2	▼0.5%
77.	NOR	Namsos Airport	Namsos	TRD/ENNM	31.166	▲14	▲72.0%
78.	NOR	Mehamn Airport	Mehamn	MEH/ENMH	30.980	▼8	▼18.2%
79.	ISL	Hornafjörður Airport	Höfn	HFN/BIHN	28.200	▲2	▼5.7%
80.	FIN	Kemi-Tornio Airport	Kemi/Tornio	KEM/EFKE	28.085	▲8	▲22.2%
81.	NOR	Vardø Airport Svartnes	Vardø	VAW/ENSS	25.222	▲4	▼3.8%
82.	NOR	Narvik Airport Framnes	Narvik	NVK/ENNK	23.488	▲1	▼11.2%
83.	NOR	Røst Airport	Røst	RET/ENRS	22.590	▲11	▲62.4%
84.	NOR	Sogndal Airport Haukåsen	Sogndal	SOG/ENSG	22.195	▼4	▼28.3%
85.	NOR	Sandane Airport Anda	Sandane	SDN/ENSD	21.641	▲1	▼14.9%
86.	FIN	Kokkola-Pietarsaari Airport	Kokkola/Jakobstad	KOK/EFKK	21.484	▲1	▼12.2%
87.	NOR	Rørvik Airport Ryum	Rørvik	RVK/ENRM	19.761	▼3	▼25.1%
88.	NOR	Stord Airport Sørstokken	Leirvik	SRP/ENSO	16.538	▲2	▼20.3%
89.	NOR	Andøya Airport Andenes	Andenes	ANX/ENAN	15.224	Steady	▼28.8%
90.	FIN	Vaasa Airport	Vaasa	VAA/EFVA	14.827	▲3	▼5.9%
91.	DEN	Bornholm Airport	Rønne	RNN/EKRN	14.515	▼28	▼72.5%
92.	SWE	Ronneby Airport	Ronneby/Karlskrona	RNB/ESDF	13.750	▲5	▲30.1%
93.	DEN	Aarhus Airport	Aarhus	AAR/EKAH	12.191	▼46	▼97.1%
94.	SWE	Lycksele Airport	Lycksele	LYC/ESNL	11.370	▲9	▲57.3%
95.	FIN	Jyväskylä Airport	Jyväskylä	JYV/EFJY	11.257	▼3	▼35.9%
96.	FIN	Kittilä Airport	Kittilä	KTT/EFKT	9.209	▲5	▲13.1%
97.	NOR	Sørkjosen Airport	Sørkjosen	SOJ/ENSR	8.722	▲5	▲12.8%
98.	SWE	Halmstad City Airport	Halmstad	HAD/ESMT	5.458	▼3	▼54.1%
99.	SWE	Höga Kusten Airport	Kramfors/Sollefteå	KRF/ESNK	4.545	▲8	▲13.0%
100.	DEN	Karup Airport	Karup	KRP/EKKA	3.843	▲9	▲27.6%

Greenlandic airports are excluded from this list because of lack of information. The ranking does not include Greenlandic airports.

== Busiest metropolitan air-traffic regions ==
=== 2016 statistics ===
Rank	Country	Metropolitan area	Total passengers	Rank change	Change 2014–2015	Airport(s) included
1.	DEN/SWE	Metropolitan Copenhagen / Øresund Region	31,678,207	Steady	▲8.5%	Copenhagen Airport, Malmö Airport, Roskilde Airport and Ängelholm Helsingborg Airport
2.	SWE	Metropolitan Stockholm	29,356,148	▲1	▲6.5%	Stockholm Arlanda Airport, Stockholm Skavsta Airport, Bromma Stockholm Airport and Stockholm Västerås Airport
3.	NOR	Greater Oslo Region	28,547,334	▼1	▲2.4%	Oslo Gardermoen Airport, Oslo Rygge Airport and Oslo Torp Sandefjord Airport

=== 2015 statistics ===
Rank	Country	Metropolitan area	Total passengers	Rank change	Change 2014–2015	Airport(s) included
1.	DEN/SWE	Metropolitan Copenhagen / Øresund Region	29,213,617	Steady	▲3.8%	Copenhagen Airport, Malmö Airport, Roskilde Airport and Ängelholm Helsingborg Airport
2.	NOR	Greater Oslo Region	27,862,892	Steady	▲0.1%	Oslo Gardermoen Airport, Oslo Rygge Airport and Oslo Torp Sandefjord Airport
3.	SWE	Metropolitan Stockholm	27,556,768	Steady	▲3.6%	Stockholm Arlanda Airport, Stockholm Skavsta Airport, Bromma Stockholm Airport and Stockholm Västerås Airport

=== 2014 statistics ===
Rank	Country	Metropolitan area	Total passengers	Rank change	Change 2013–2014	Airport(s) included
1.	DEN/SWE	Metropolitan Copenhagen / Øresund Region	28,136,631	▲1	▲5.6%	Copenhagen Airport, Malmö Airport, Roskilde Airport and Ängelholm Helsingborg Airport
2.	NOR	Greater Oslo Region	27,839,889	▼1	▲4.3%	Oslo Gardermoen Airport, Oslo Rygge Airport and Oslo Torp Sandefjord Airport
3.	SWE	Metropolitan Stockholm	26,597,749	Steady	▲5.2%	Stockholm Arlanda Airport, Stockholm Skavsta Airport, Bromma Stockholm Airport and Stockholm Västerås Airport

=== 2013 statistics (provisional) ===
Rank	Country	Metropolitan area	Total passengers	Rank change	Change 2012–2013	Airport(s) included
1.	NOR	Greater Oslo Region	26,703,733	▲1	▲4.6%	Oslo Gardermoen Airport, Oslo Rygge Airport and Oslo Torp Sandefjord Airport
2.	DEN/SWE	Metropolitan Copenhagen / Øresund Region	26,633,416	▼1	▲2.9%	Copenhagen Airport, Malmö Airport, Roskilde Airport and Ängelholm Helsingborg Airport
3.	SWE	Metropolitan Stockholm	25,280,190	Steady	▲3.4%	Stockholm Arlanda Airport, Stockholm Skavsta Airport, Bromma Stockholm Airport and Stockholm Västerås Airport
4.	FIN	Greater Helsinki	15,279,043	Steady	▲2.8%	Helsinki Airport and Helsinki-Malmi Airport
5.	NOR	Greater Bergen Region	6,213,960	Steady	▲6.9%	Bergen Airport Flesland
6.	SWE	Metropolitan Gothenburg	5,861,666	Steady	▲3.5%	Göteborg Landvetter Airport and Göteborg City Airport
7.	NOR	Greater Stavanger	4,668,403	Steady	▲5.8%	Stavanger Airport Sola
8.	NOR	Trondheim Region	4,311,328	Steady	▲3.6%	Trondheim Airport Værnes
9.	DEN	East Jutland metropolitan area	3,284,421	Steady	▲2.6%	Billund Airport and Aarhus Airport
10.	ICE	Capital Region	3,132,513	Steady	▲12.3%	Keflavík International Airport and Reykjavík Airport

=== 2012 statistics ===
==== Passengers ====
Rank	Country	Metropolitan area	Total passengers	Rank change	Change 2011–2012	Airport(s) included
1.	DEN/SWE	Metropolitan Copenhagen / Øresund Region	25,873,527	Steady	▲3.1%	Copenhagen Airport, Malmö Airport, Roskilde Airport and Ängelholm Helsingborg Airport
2.	NOR	Greater Oslo Region	25,518,536	Steady	▲5.8%	Oslo Gardermoen Airport, Oslo Rygge Airport and Oslo Torp Sandefjord Airport
3.	SWE	Metropolitan Stockholm	24,452,326	Steady	▲2.0%	Stockholm Arlanda Airport, Stockholm Skavsta Airport, Bromma Stockholm Airport and Stockholm Västerås Airport
4.	FIN	Greater Helsinki	14,858,215	Steady	▼0.1%	Helsinki Airport and Helsinki-Malmi Airport
5.	NOR	Greater Bergen Region	5,814,413	▲1	▲3.8%	Bergen Airport Flesland
6.	SWE	Metropolitan Gothenburg	5,661,925	▼1	▼0.2%	Göteborg Landvetter Airport and Göteborg City Airport
7.	NOR	Greater Stavanger	4,413,987	Steady	▲6.8%	Stavanger Airport Sola
8.	NOR	Trondheim Region	4,160,162	Steady	▲6.0%	Trondheim Airport Værnes
9.	DEN	East Jutland metropolitan area	3,202,190	Steady	▼3.0%	Billund Airport and Aarhus Airport
10.	ICE	Capital Region	2,790,555	Steady	▲9.8%	Keflavík International Airport and Reykjavík Airport

==== Aircraft movements ====
Note: The statistics provided below do not include any movements by aircraft registered as military or touch and goes.

Rank	Country	Metropolitan area	Total movements	Rank change	Change 2011–2012	Airport(s) included
1.	DEN/SWE	Metropolitan Copenhagen / Øresund Region	366,329	Steady	▼1.2%	Copenhagen Airport, Malmö Airport, Roskilde Airport and Ängelholm Helsingborg Airport
2.	SWE	Metropolitan Stockholm	327,918	Steady	▼4.3%	Stockholm Arlanda Airport, Stockholm Skavsta Airport, Bromma Stockholm Airport and Stockholm Västerås Airport
3.	NOR	Greater Oslo Region	298,811	Steady	▲3.5%	Oslo Airport, Moss Airport Rygge and Torp Sandefjord Airport
4.	FIN	Greater Helsinki	201,882	Steady	▼10.3%	Helsinki Airport and Helsinki-Malmi Airport
5.	ICE	Capital Region	110,101	▲1	▼0.1%	Keflavík International Airport and Reykjavík Airport
6.	SWE	Metropolitan Gothenburg	109,770	▼1	▼12.1%	Göteborg Landvetter Airport and Göteborg City Airport
7.	NOR	Greater Bergen Region	103,841	Steady	▲0.6%	Bergen Airport Flesland
8.	NOR	Greater Stavanger	86,158	Steady	▲5.0%	Stavanger Airport Sola
9.	DEN	East Jutland metropolitan area	70,689	Steady	▼10.1%	Billund Airport and Aarhus Airport
10.	NOR	Trondheim Region	60,987	Steady	▲5.3%	Trondheim Airport Værnes

==== Freight and mail tonnes ====
Note: The statistics below are provided in metric tonnes with three decimal digits, i.e. with an accuracy of number of kilograms handled at each airport. The statistics do not include belly cargo transported on regular or charter passenger flights.

Rank	Country	Metropolitan area	Total tonnes	Rank change	Change 2011–2012	Airport(s) included
1.	FIN	Greater Helsinki	192,161.494	▲1	▲12.8%	Helsinki Airport and Helsinki-Malmi Airport
2.	DEN/SWE	Metropolitan Copenhagen / Øresund Region	184,930.017	▼1	▲2.7%	Copenhagen Airport, Malmö Airport, Roskilde Airport and Ängelholm Helsingborg Airport
3.	NOR	Greater Oslo Region	104,729.818	Steady	▲6.5%	Oslo Airport, Moss Airport Rygge and Torp Sandefjord Airport
4.	SWE	Metropolitan Stockholm	80,292.293	Steady	▼11.8%	Stockholm Arlanda Airport, Stockholm Skavsta Airport, Bromma Stockholm Airport and Stockholm Västerås Airport
5.	ICE	Capital Region	41,218.100	▲1	▲6.0%	Keflavík International Airport and Reykjavík Airport
6.	SWE	Metropolitan Gothenburg	36,536.034	▼1	▼16.3%	Göteborg Landvetter Airport and Göteborg City Airport
7.	DEN	East Jutland metropolitan area	14,677.548	Steady	▼1.5%	Billund Airport and Aarhus Airport
8.	FIN	Turku metropolitan area	8,011.953	Steady	▲2.0%	Turku Airport
9.	NOR	Greater Bergen Region	6,747.425	Steady	▲0.5%	Bergen Airport Flesland
10.	SWE	Örebro County	6,415.779	Steady	▲9.3%	Örebro Airport

== Busiest air routes ==
Included below are statistics for the busiest air routes in terms of total passengers on board. When air traffic exists to/from or between secondary airports for a city/region, the secondary airports are included in the statistics below according to the footnotes. The main airport is defined as the airport handling the highest number of passengers for each city/region.

=== Busiest intra-Nordic air routes ===
These statistics include total passengers on-board between and within the Nordic countries.

Rank	Country 1	City 1	Country 2	City 2	Passengers (2012)	Passengers (2016)	Passengers (2019)
1.	NOR	Oslo^{1}	NOR	Trondheim	2,039,184	2,119,844	2,206,801
2.	NOR	Oslo^{1}	NOR	Bergen	1,991,095	2,037,755	2,165,482
3.	NOR	Oslo^{2}	NOR	Stavanger	1,620,606	1,648,488	1,761,646
4.	DEN	Copenhagen	NOR	Oslo^{2}	1,410,384	1,506,326	1,540,240
5.	NOR	Oslo	SWE	Stockholm	1,200,562	1,399,211	1,408,504
6.	DEN	Copenhagen^{4}	SWE	Stockholm^{3}	1,309,198	1,555,615	1,390,123
7.	SWE	Stockholm^{3}	FIN	Helsinki	1,029,827	1,275,468	1,379,068
8.	NOR	Oslo	NOR	Tromsø	1,033,295	1,178,371	1,242,962
9.	SWE	Stockholm^{3}	SWE	Gothenburg	1,270,234	1,332,597	1,129,552
10.	SWE	Stockholm	SWE	Luleå	984,869	1,068,051	1,046,100
11.	SWE	Stockholm^{3}	SWE	Malmö^{4}	1,191,531	1,209,688	1,023,136
12.	FIN	Helsinki	FIN	Oulu	885,062	949,143	956,641
13.	SWE	Stockholm^{3}	SWE	Umeå	916,533	957,840	860,500
14.	DEN	Copenhagen	FIN	Helsinki	777,804	792,299	852,741
15.	NOR	Oslo	NOR	Bodø	737,703	809,484	837,623
16.	DEN	Copenhagen	DEN	Aalborg	919,302	890,706	782,275
17.	NOR	Oslo	NOR	Ålesund	605,261	606,046	654,853
18.	NOR	Oslo	NOR	Harstad/Narvik	521,645	579,286	604,761
19.	FIN	Helsinki	FIN	Rovaniemi	345,496	396,897	543,660
20.	DEN	Copenhagen	ISL	Keflavík/Reykjavík	379,302	534,285	531,975
21.	NOR	Bergen	NOR	Stavanger	732,115	560,686	513,845
22.	NOR	Oslo	FIN	Helsinki	341,761	406,888	513,127
23.	NOR	Oslo	NOR	Kristiansand S.	485,799	510,597	510,077
24.	NOR	Oslo	NOR	Haugesund	424,181	450,732	474,092
25.	DEN	Copenhagen	NOR	Bergen	382,375	483,949	434,841
26.	SWE	Stockholm^{3}	SWE	Östersund/Åre	336,108	470,704	429,612
27.	SWE	Stockholm^{3}	SWE	Helsingborg/Ängelholm^{4}	384,640	402,377	376,367
28.	SWE	Stockholm^{3}	SWE	Visby	?	381,610	375,468
29.	NOR	Oslo	NOR	Molde	342,331	371,564	354,012
30.	NOR	Bergen	NOR	Trondheim	488,915	410,029	345,612

^{1} Includes Oslo Airport, Moss Airport Rygge and Torp Sandefjord Airport
^{2} Includes Oslo Airport and Torp Sandefjord Airport
^{3} Includes Stockholm Arlanda Airport and Bromma Stockholm Airport
^{4} In these statistics Malmö and Helsingborg/Ängelholm are separated from Copenhagen/Roskilde. When these airports in the Øresund region are considered together, flights between this region and Stockholm carried 2,885,369 passengers in 2012 and 2,789,626 in 2019, making this the busiest intra-Nordic air corridor.

=== Busiest intra-European Union air routes ===
These statistics include total passenger on-board between the Nordic countries and other countries within the European Union and member states of the European Free Trade Association. At the time these values refer to, the United Kingdom was part of the European Union, and is therefore still listed here.

Rank	Country 1	City 1	Country 2	City 2	Passengers (2012)	Passengers (2016)	Passengers (2019)
1.	DEN	Copenhagen	GBR	London^{1}	1,637,520	2,500,567	2,214,177
2.	SWE	Stockholm^{2}	GBR	London^{1}	1,532,962	1,809,061	1,610,929
3.	NOR	Oslo^{3}	GBR	London^{1}	1,297,192	1,319,675	1,434,256
4.	DEN	Copenhagen	NLD	Amsterdam	822,858	974,986	1,109,796
5.	FIN	Helsinki	GBR	London^{8}	646,175	897,408	1,047,095
6.	DEN	Copenhagen	FRA	Paris^{4}	845,000	928,240	886,836
7.	SWE	Stockholm	NLD	Amsterdam	630,806	780,689	863,616
8.	ISL	Reykjavík^{18}	GBR	London^{1}	314,555	822,075	851,995
9.	NOR	Oslo^{5}	NLD	Amsterdam	720,778	798,313	829,768
10.	FIN	Helsinki	NLD	Amsterdam	463,784	560,823	738,498
11.	SWE	Stockholm^{6}	DEU	Frankfurt^{7}	673,818	688,138	697,945
12.	SWE	Stockholm^{6}	FRA	Paris^{9}	563,227	487,874	664,469
13.	DEN	Copenhagen	DEU	Frankfurt	644,956	662,306	663,662
14.	DEN	Copenhagen	DEU	Berlin^{11}	527,191	682,020	628,470
15.	FIN	Helsinki	DEU	Munich	385,880	489,650	589,107
16.	SWE	Gothenburg^{10}	GBR	London^{1}	537,202	698,074	578,776
17.	FIN	Helsinki	GER	Berlin	325,766	453,427	569,767
18.	SWE	Stockholm^{6}	DEU	Munich^{14}	440,768	477,758	559,991
19.	NOR	Oslo^{3}	DEU	Frankfurt^{7}	479,892	475,475	539,327
20.	SWE	Stockholm^{6}	ESP	Málaga			538,863
21.	FIN	Helsinki	DEU	Frankfurt	525,857	500,358	527,928
22.	DEN	Copenhagen	ESP	Málaga	202,893	503,266	523,432
23.	SWE	Stockholm^{6}	DEU	Berlin^{11}	416,275	490,647	516,373
24.	DEN	Copenhagen	CHE	Zurich	425,176	415,046	515,266
25.	DEN	Copenhagen	DEU	Munich	398,379	478,197	513,678
26.	NOR	Oslo^{12}	FRA	Paris^{13}	482,353	459,142	513,447
27.	FIN	Helsinki	FRA	Paris	422,260	410,691	492,822
28.	DEN	Copenhagen	BEL	Brussels^{16}	481,878	636,357	478,854
29.	NOR	Oslo^{3}	ESP	Alicante	197,156	468,851	474,351
30.	DEN	Copenhagen	AUT	Vienna			456,143

^{1} Includes London Heathrow Airport, London Gatwick Airport, London Stansted Airport and/or London Luton Airport
^{2} Includes Stockholm Arlanda Airport, Stockholm Skavsta Airport and Stockholm Västerås Airport
^{3} Includes Oslo Airport, Moss Airport Rygge and Torp Sandefjord Airport
^{4} Includes Paris Charles de Gaulle Airport and Paris Orly Airport
^{5} Includes Oslo Airport and Torp Sandefjord Airport
^{6} Includes Stockholm Arlanda Airport and Stockholm Skavsta Airport
^{7} Includes Frankfurt Airport and Frankfurt Hahn Airport
^{8} Includes London Heathrow Airport and London Gatwick Airport
^{9} Includes Paris Charles de Gaulle Airport and Paris Beauvais Tillé Airport
^{10} Includes Göteborg Landvetter Airport, and Göteborg City Airport
^{11} Includes Berlin Tegel Airport and Berlin Schönefeld Airport
^{12} Includes Oslo Airport and Moss Airport Rygge
^{13} Includes Paris Charles de Gaulle Airport, Paris Orly Airport and Paris Beauvais Tillé Airport
^{14} Includes Munich Airport and Allgäu Airport Memmingen
^{15} Includes Barcelona–El Prat Airport and Girona–Costa Brava Airport
^{16} Includes Brussels Airport and Brussels-Charleroi Airport
^{17} Includes Rome-Fiumicino Airport and Rome-Ciampino Airport
^{18} Refers to Keflavík Airport

=== Busiest extra–European Union air routes ===
These statistics include total passengers on board between the Nordic countries and countries outside of the European Union and non-member states of the European Free Trade Association.

Rank	Country 1	City 1	Country 2	City 2	Passengers (2012)	Passengers (2016)	Passengers (2019)
1.	SWE	Stockholm	TUR	Istanbul^{1}	292,119	474,403	499,736
2.	DEN	Copenhagen	TUR	Istanbul^{1}	367,859	475,497	495,425
3.	FIN	Helsinki	JPN	Tokyo^{5}	187,069	279,724	438,270
4.	ISL	Reykjavík^{7}	USA	New York City^{3}	191,500	398,685	433,338
5.	DEN	Copenhagen	QAT	Doha	156,492	286,886	400,021
6.	FIN	Helsinki	THA	Bangkok	258,607	261,486	361,581
7.	DEN	Copenhagen	USA	New York City^{3}	264,687	382,313	360,078
8.	FIN	Helsinki	HKG	Hong Kong	182,121	181,809	352,038
9.	FIN	Helsinki	RUS	Moscow^{6}	140,829	186,535	336,507
10.	DEN	Copenhagen	ARE	Dubai	204,394	319,357	330,579
11.	SWE	Stockholm	ARE	Dubai	0	258,510	302,545
12.	SWE	Stockholm	QAT	Doha	153,059	224,012	284,259
13.	SWE	Stockholm	USA	New York City^{3}	248,157	334,838	279,117
14.	NOR	Oslo	USA	New York City^{3}	241,577	306,257	276,700
15.	SWE	Stockholm	THA	Bangkok	227,198	269,933	264,007
16.	DEN	Copenhagen	THA	Bangkok	372,069	265,549	261,593
17.	FIN	Helsinki	CHN	Shanghai	146,788	162,956	244,416
18.	FIN	Helsinki	QAT	Doha	0	0	233,846
19.	ISL	Reykjavík^{7}	USA	Boston	147,700	339,691	233,669
20.	NOR	Oslo	THA	Bangkok	145,744	234,737	229,212
21.	FIN	Helsinki	JPN	Osaka	140,688	148,715	223,869
22.	FIN	Helsinki	KOR	Seoul	122,579	176,273	214,982
23.	FIN	Helsinki	RUS	Saint Petersburg	106,794	?	210,179
24.	ISL	Reykjavík^{7}	CAN	Toronto	45,900	214,105	209,201
25.	NOR	Oslo	QAT	Doha	0	147,430	202,347
26.	FIN	Helsinki	SIN	Singapore	157,754	144,491	196,941
27.	NOR	Oslo	ARE	Dubai	0	163,920	194,994
28.	DEN	Copenhagen	CHN	Beijing	139,075	136,891	189,228
29.	DEN	Copenhagen	TUR	Antalya	182,108	154,083	185,912
30.	FIN	Helsinki	USA	New York City	173,877	165,721	180,585

^{1} Includes the new Istanbul Airport, Istanbul Atatürk Airport and Istanbul Sabiha Gökçen International Airport
^{2} Includes Oslo Airport and Torp Sandefjord Airport
^{3} Includes John F. Kennedy International Airport and Newark Liberty International Airport
^{4} Includes Newark Liberty International Airport
^{5} Includes Narita International Airport
^{6} Includes Sheremetyevo International Airport
^{7} Includes Keflavík International Airport
^{8} Includes Washington-Dulles and Baltimore-Washington airports

== Gallery ==
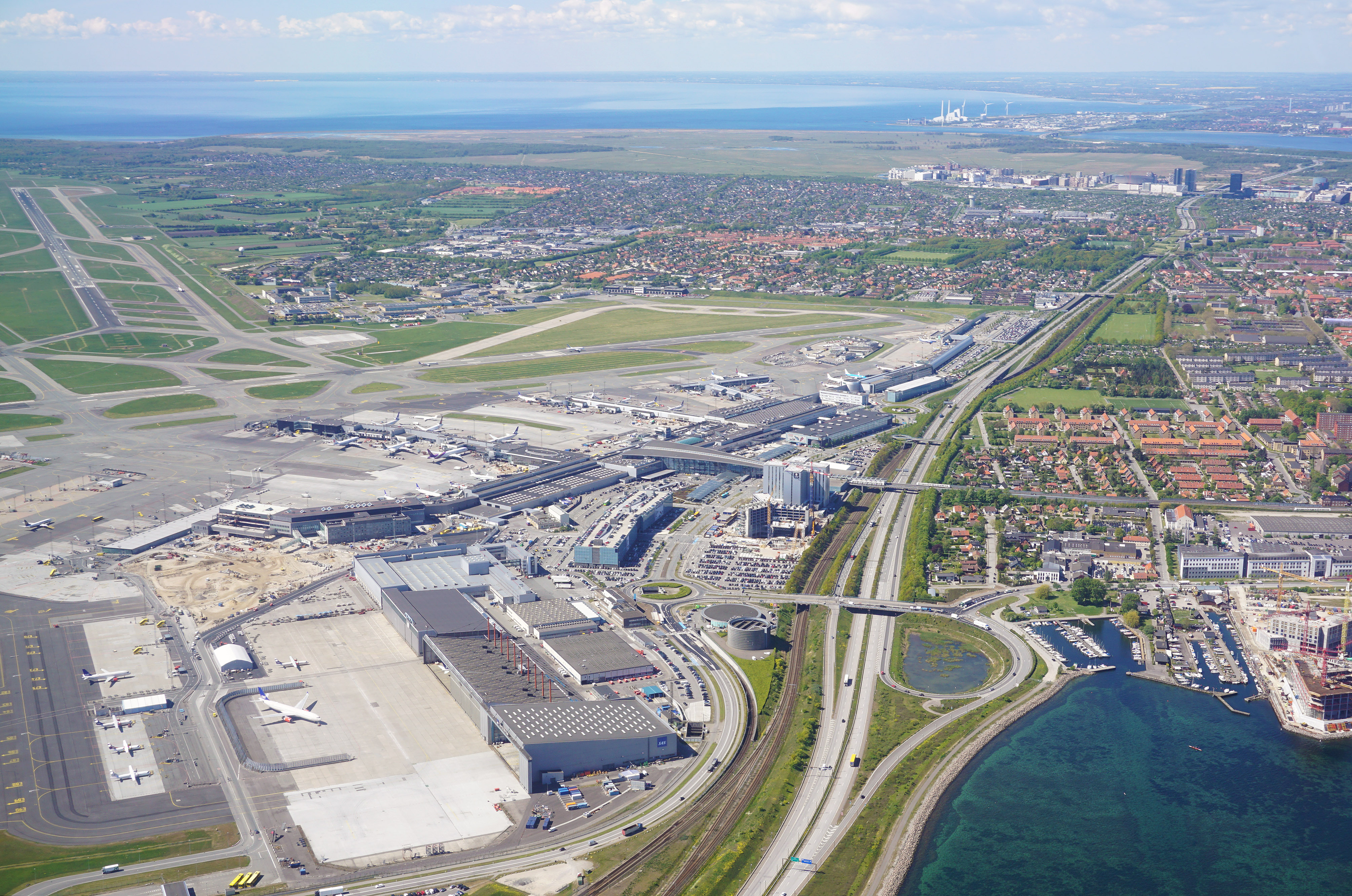
Copenhagen Airport, aerial view

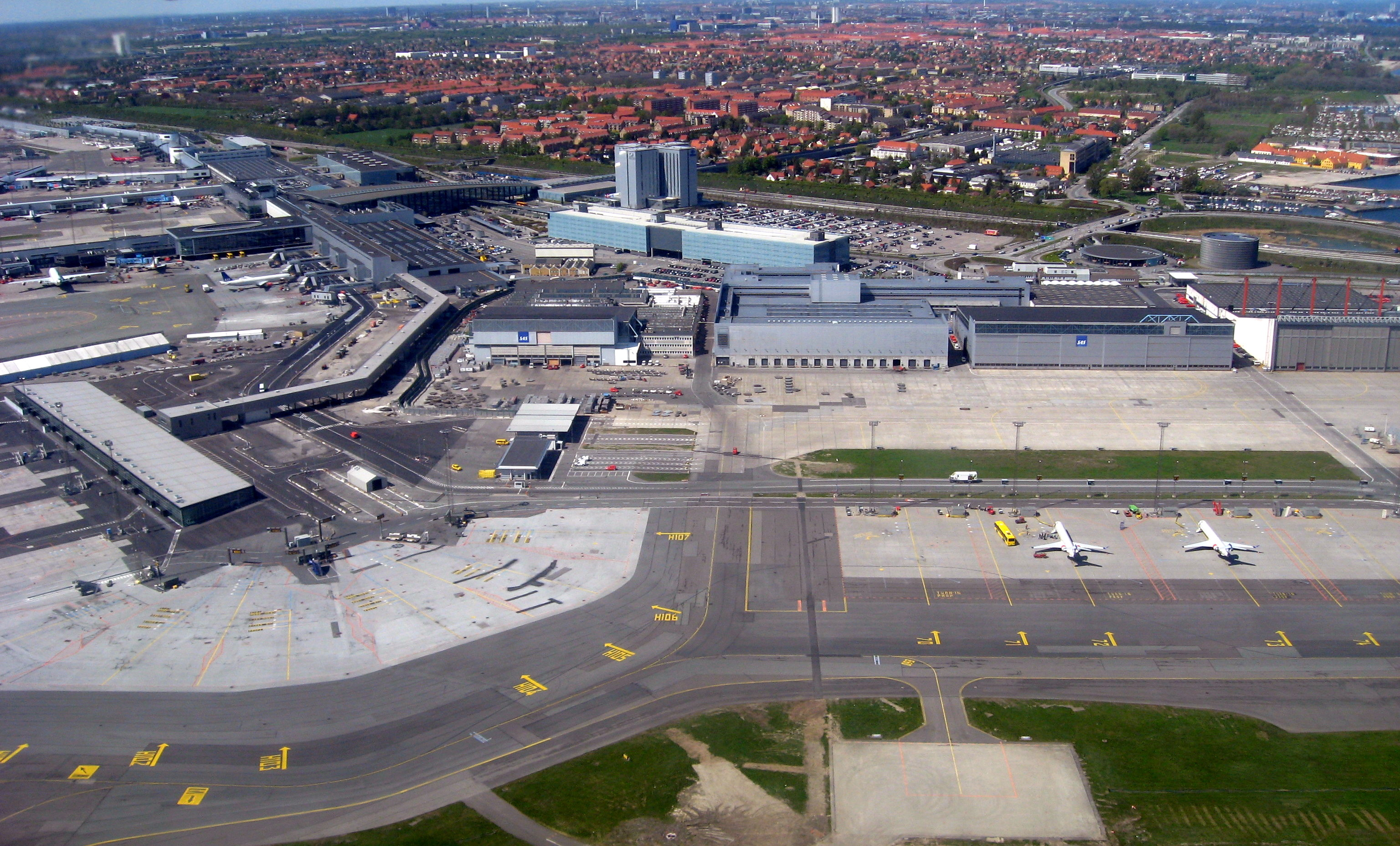
Copenhagen Airport, terminal and main hangar area with new low-cost terminal to the left

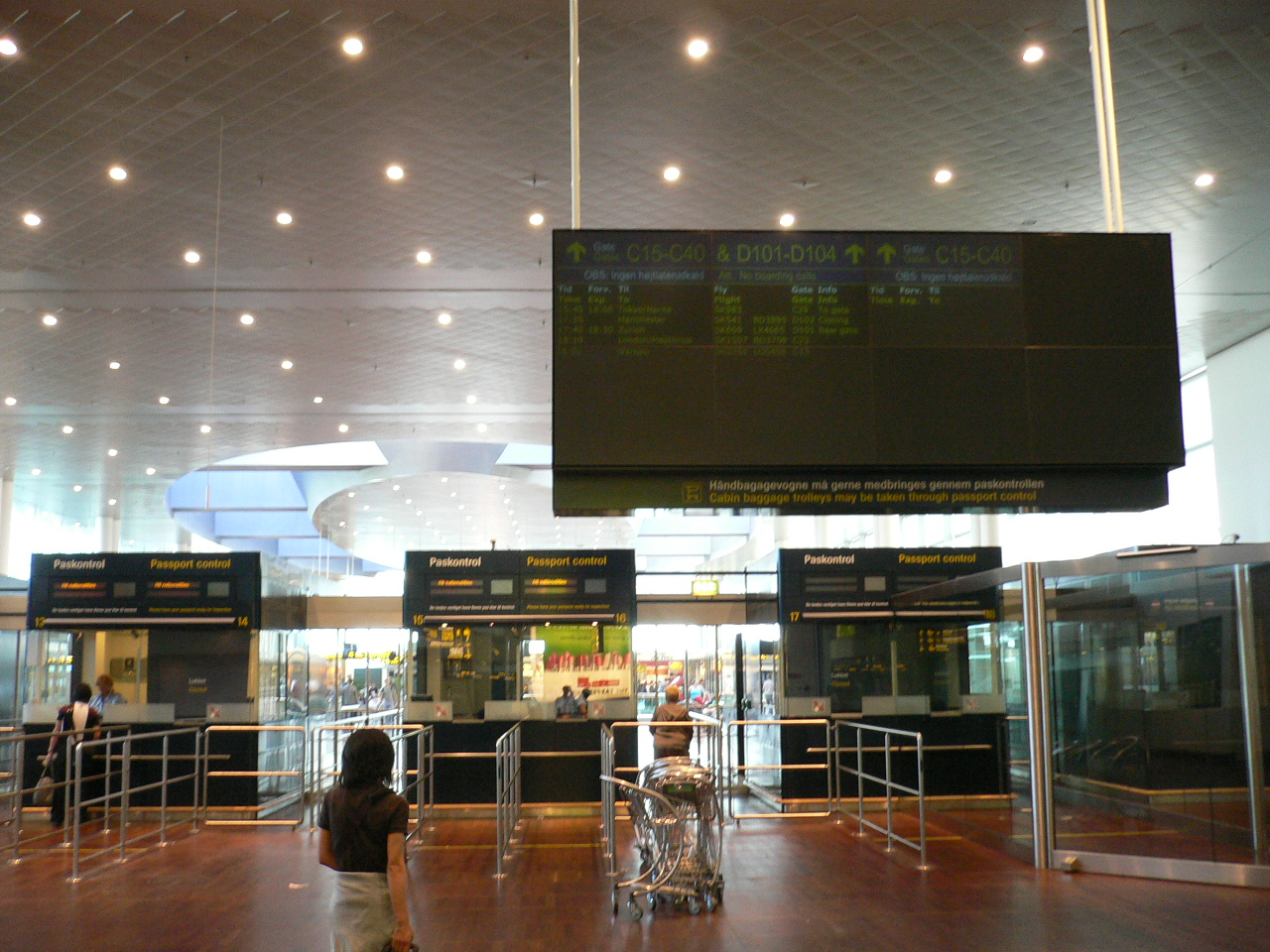
Copenhagen Airport, non-schengen border control at pier C

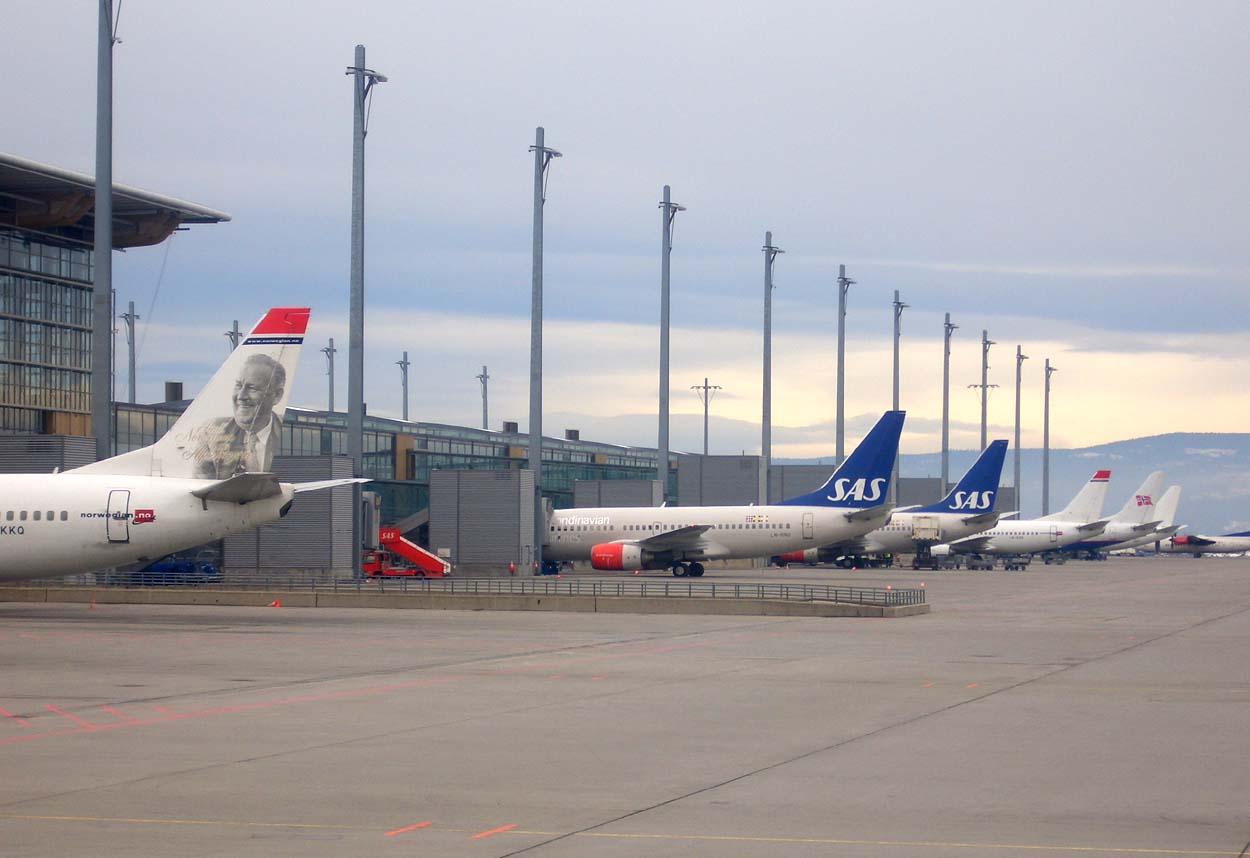
Oslo Airport, domestic concourse

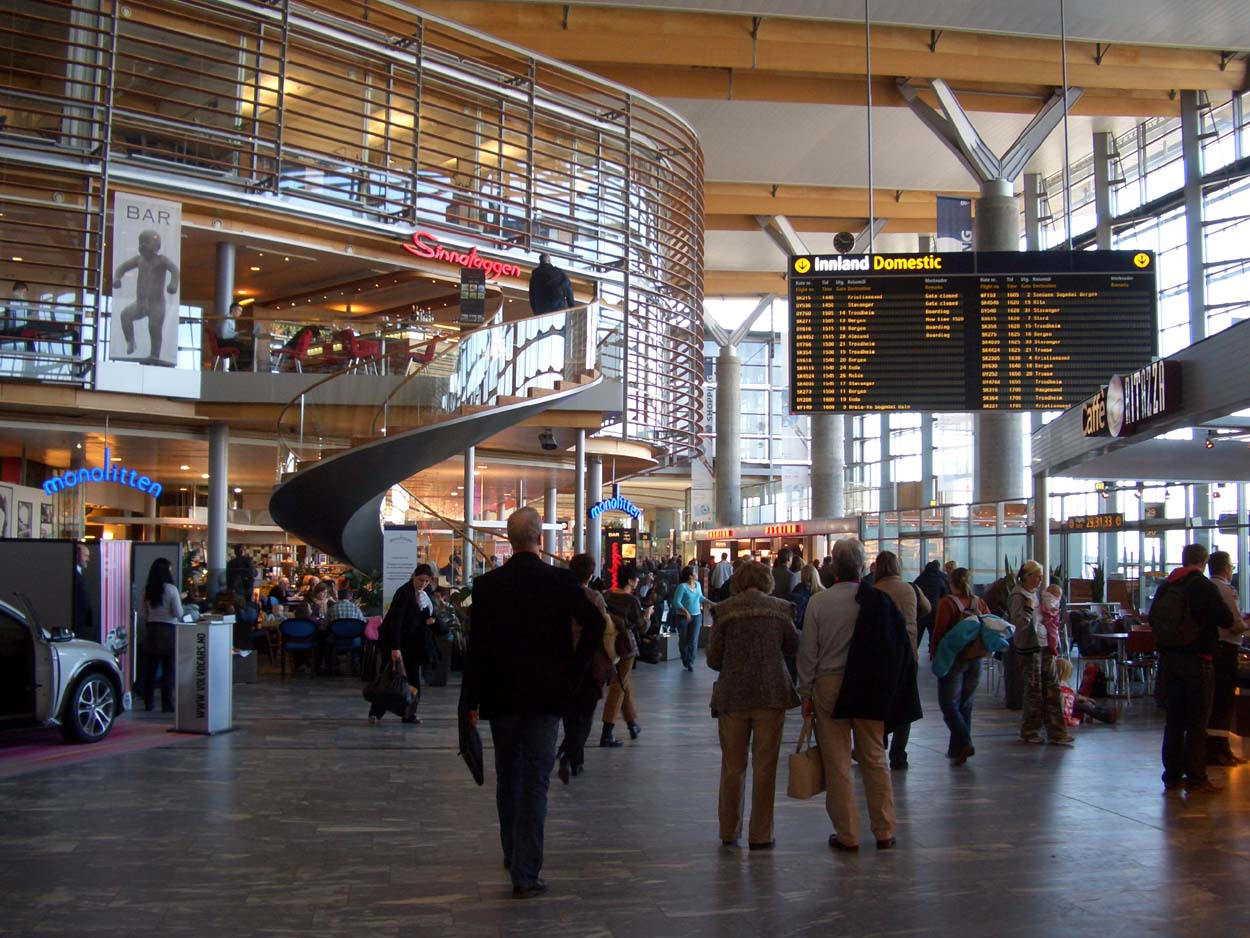
Oslo Airport, entrance to domestic area

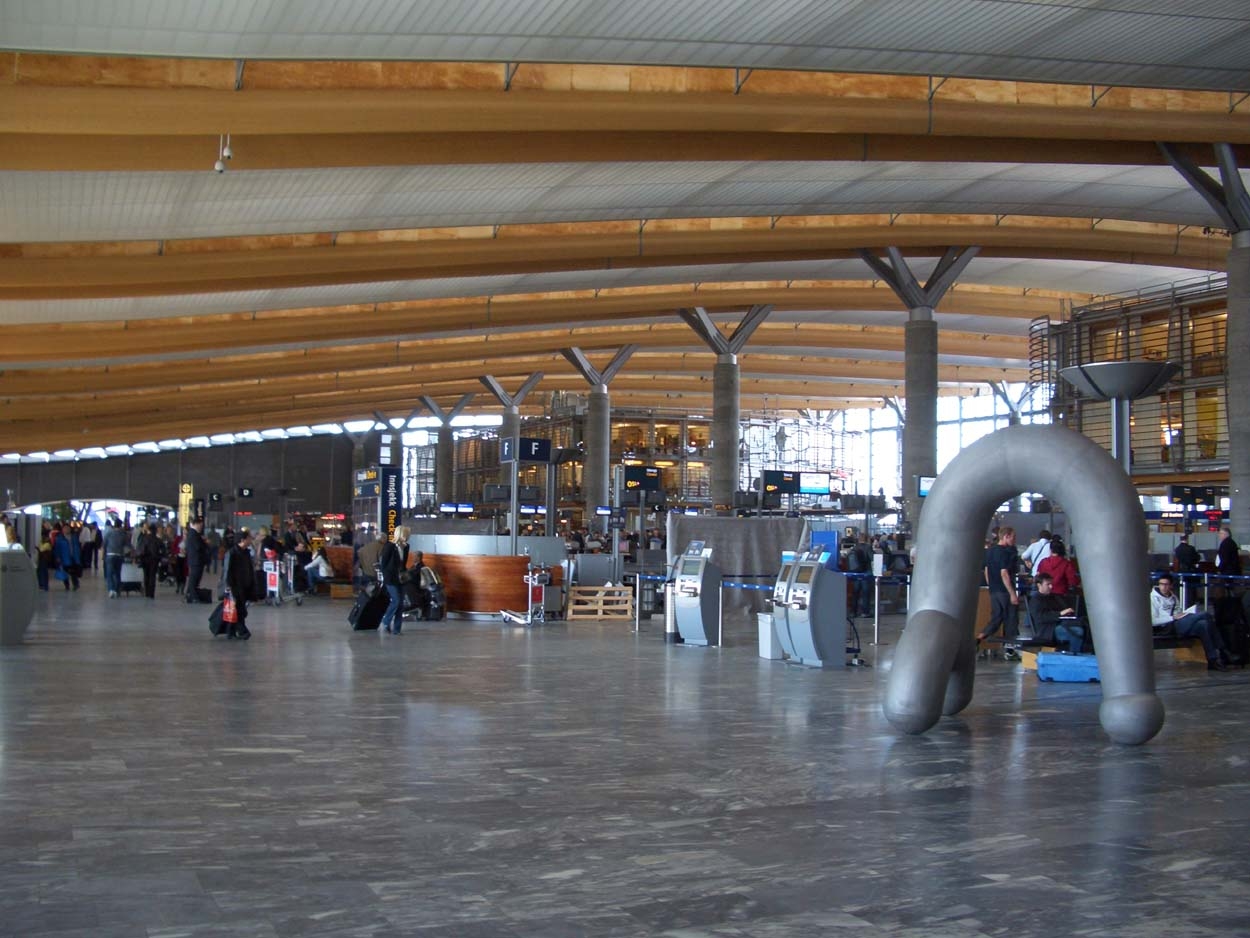
Oslo Airport, check-in area

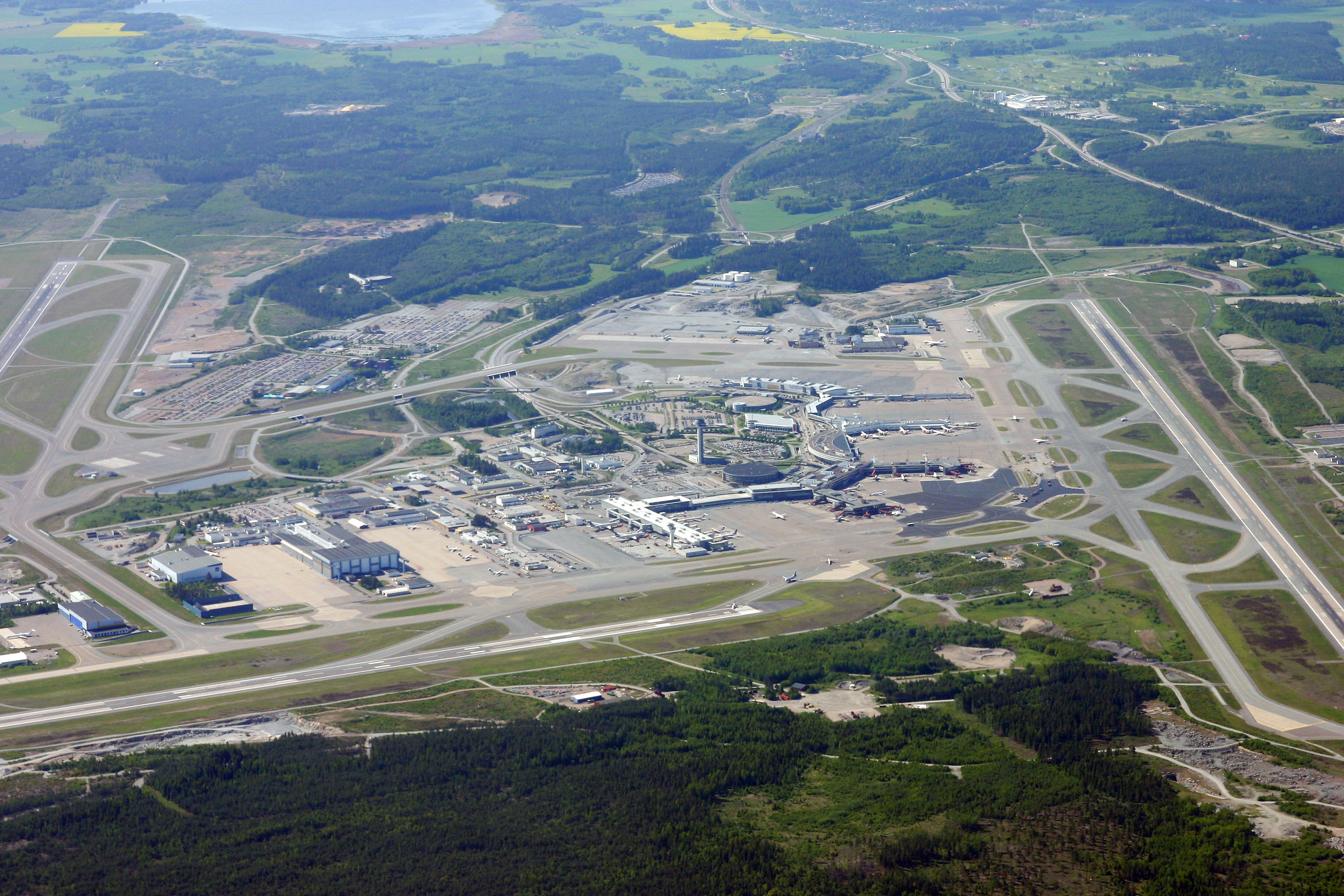
Stockholm Arlanda Airport, aerial view from the north

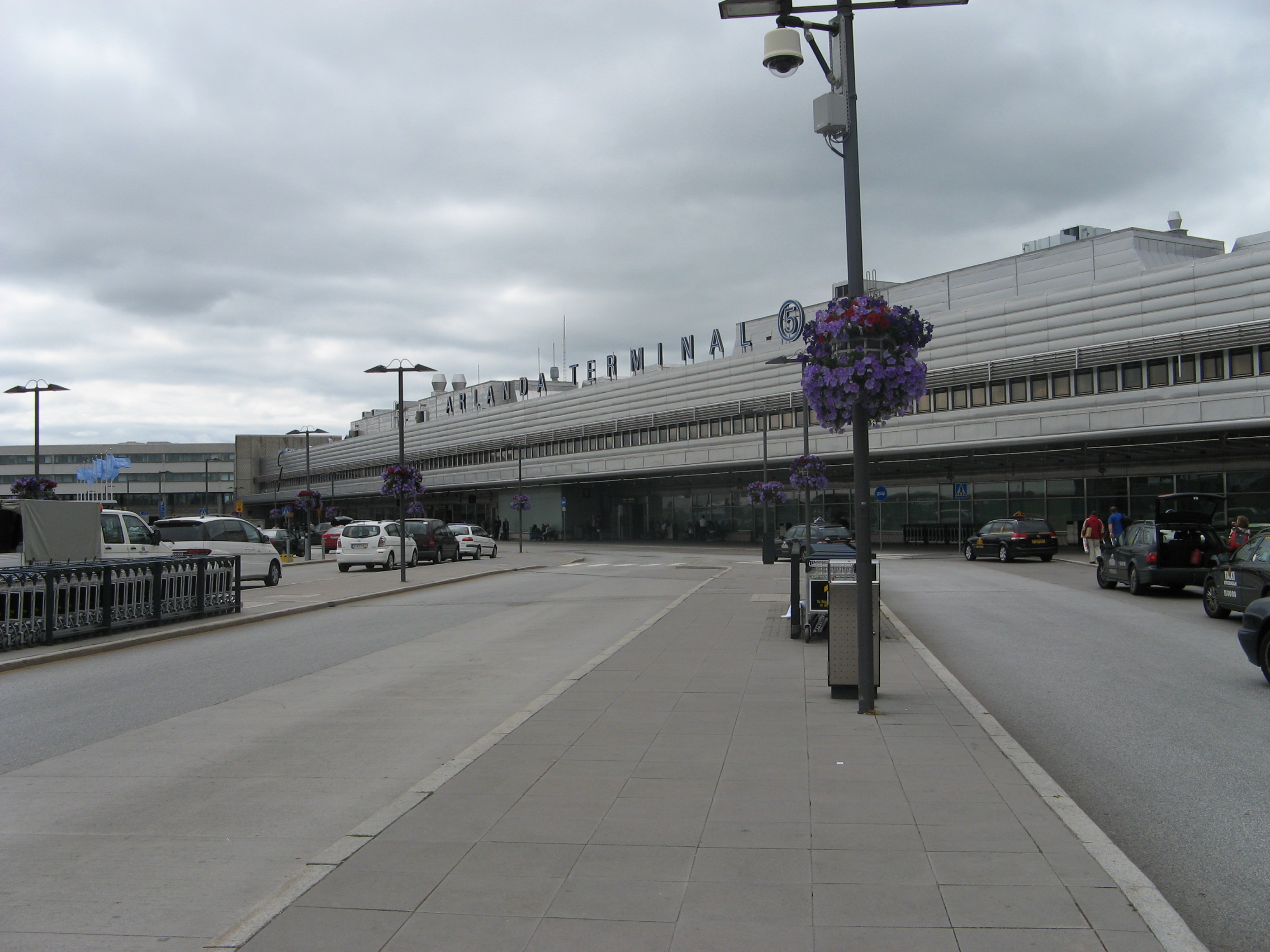
Stockholm Arlanda Airport, terminal 5

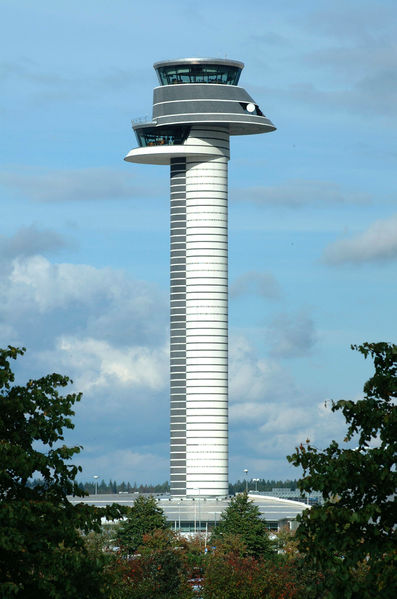
Stockholm Arlanda Airport, control tower

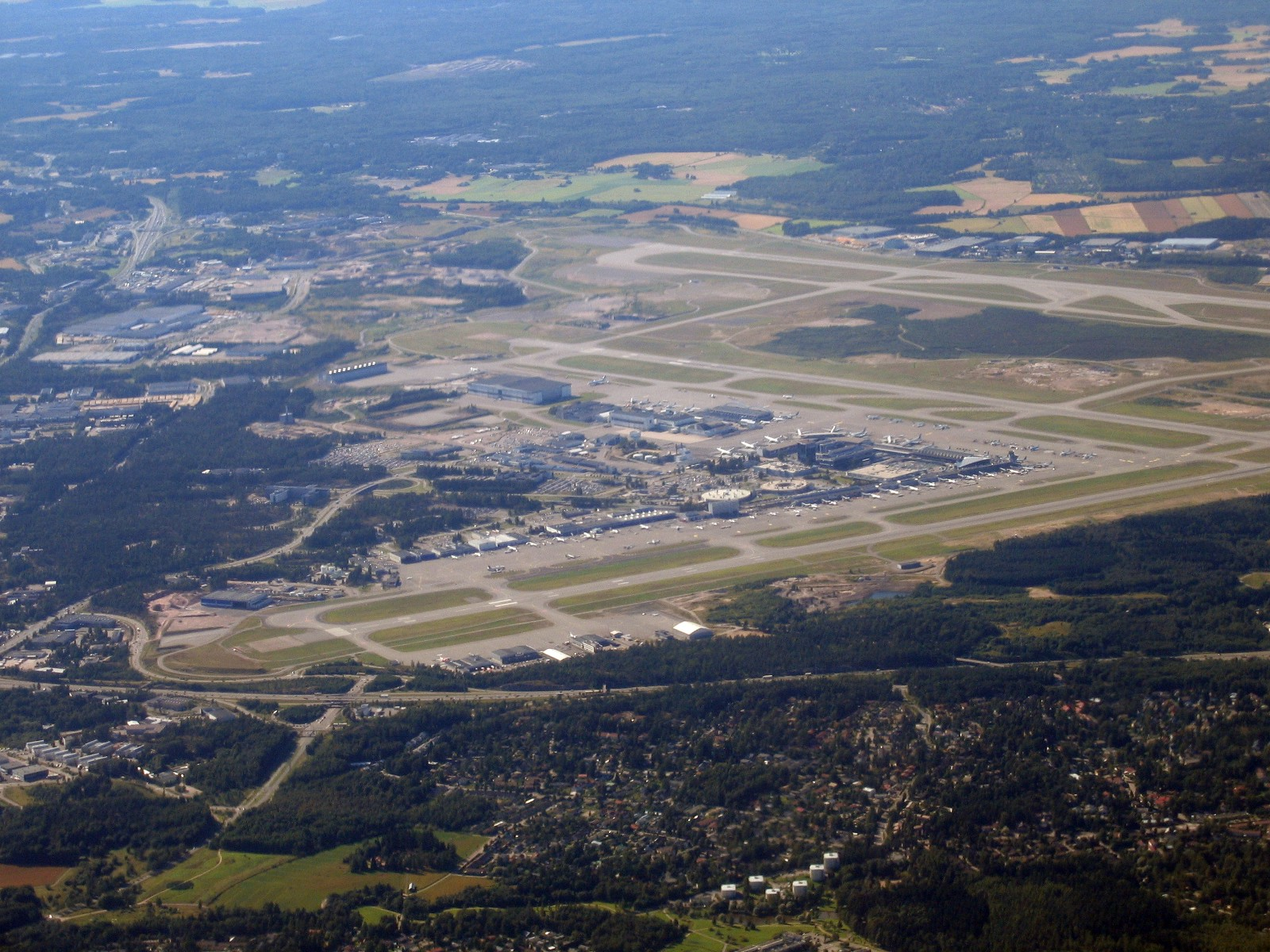
Helsinki Airport, aerial view from the east

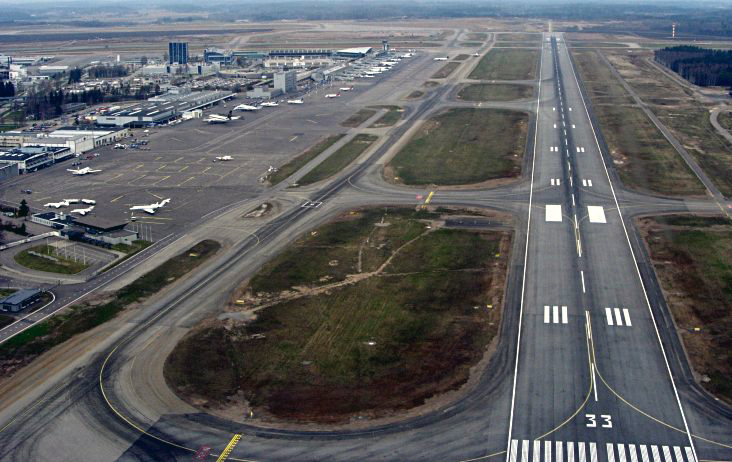
Helsinki Airport, aerial view from runway 33

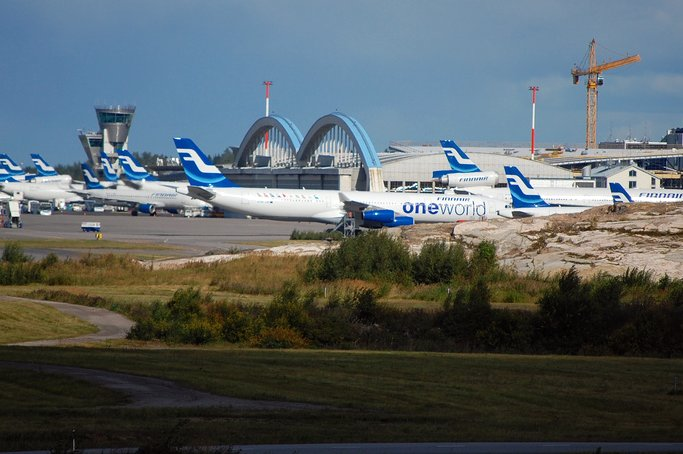
Helsinki Airport, apron view

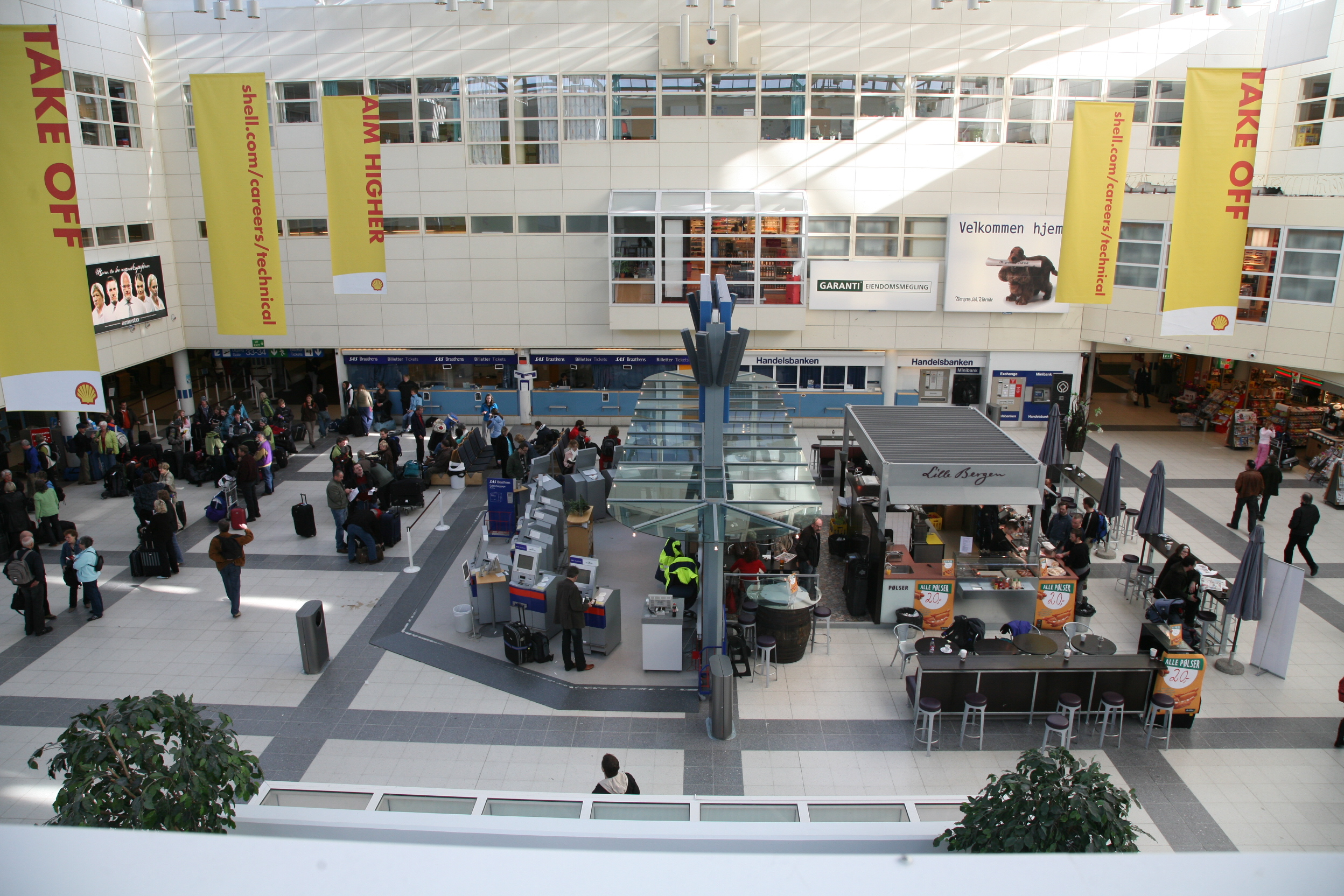
Bergen Airport Flesland, terminal view

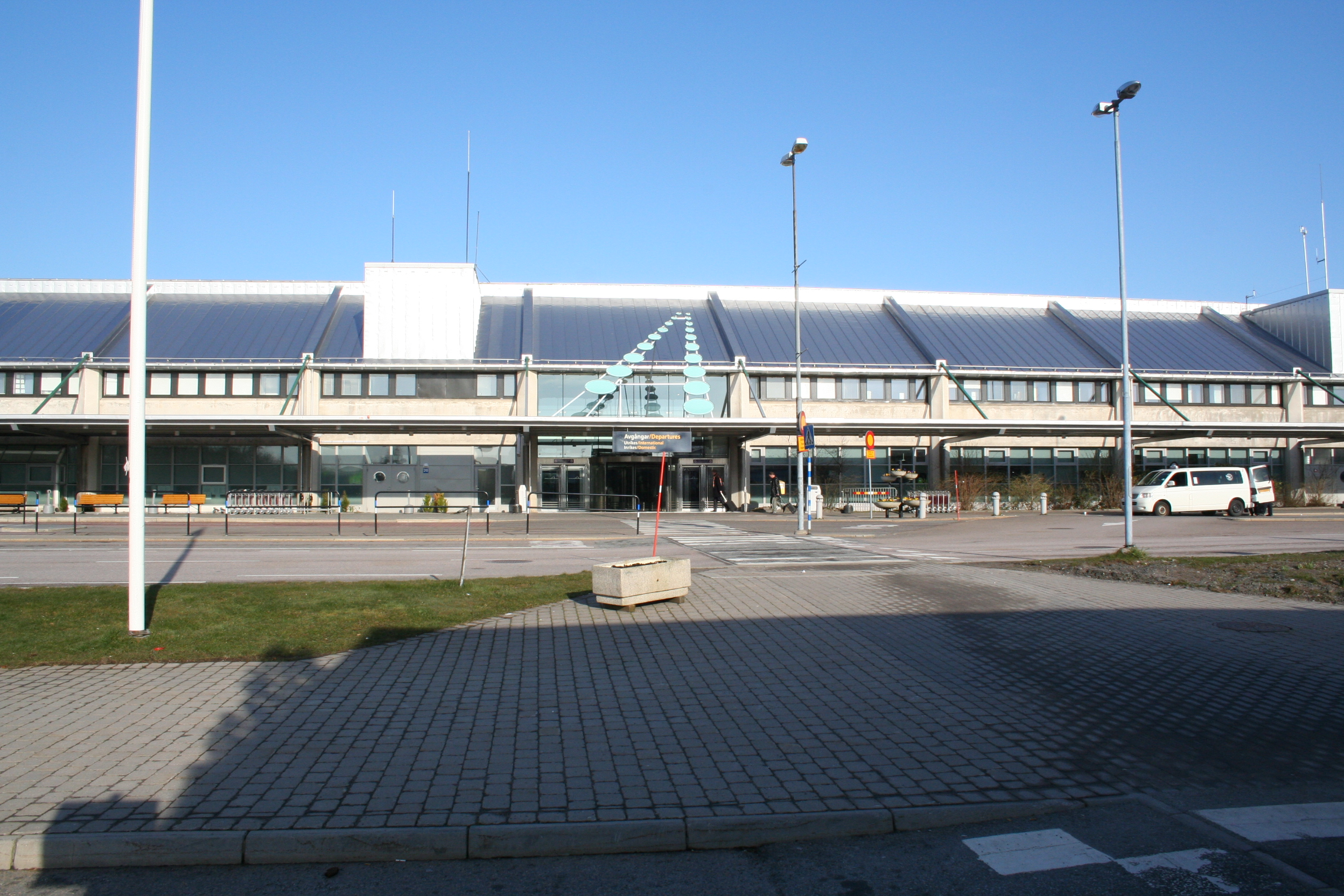
Göteborg Landvetter Airport, terminal entrance

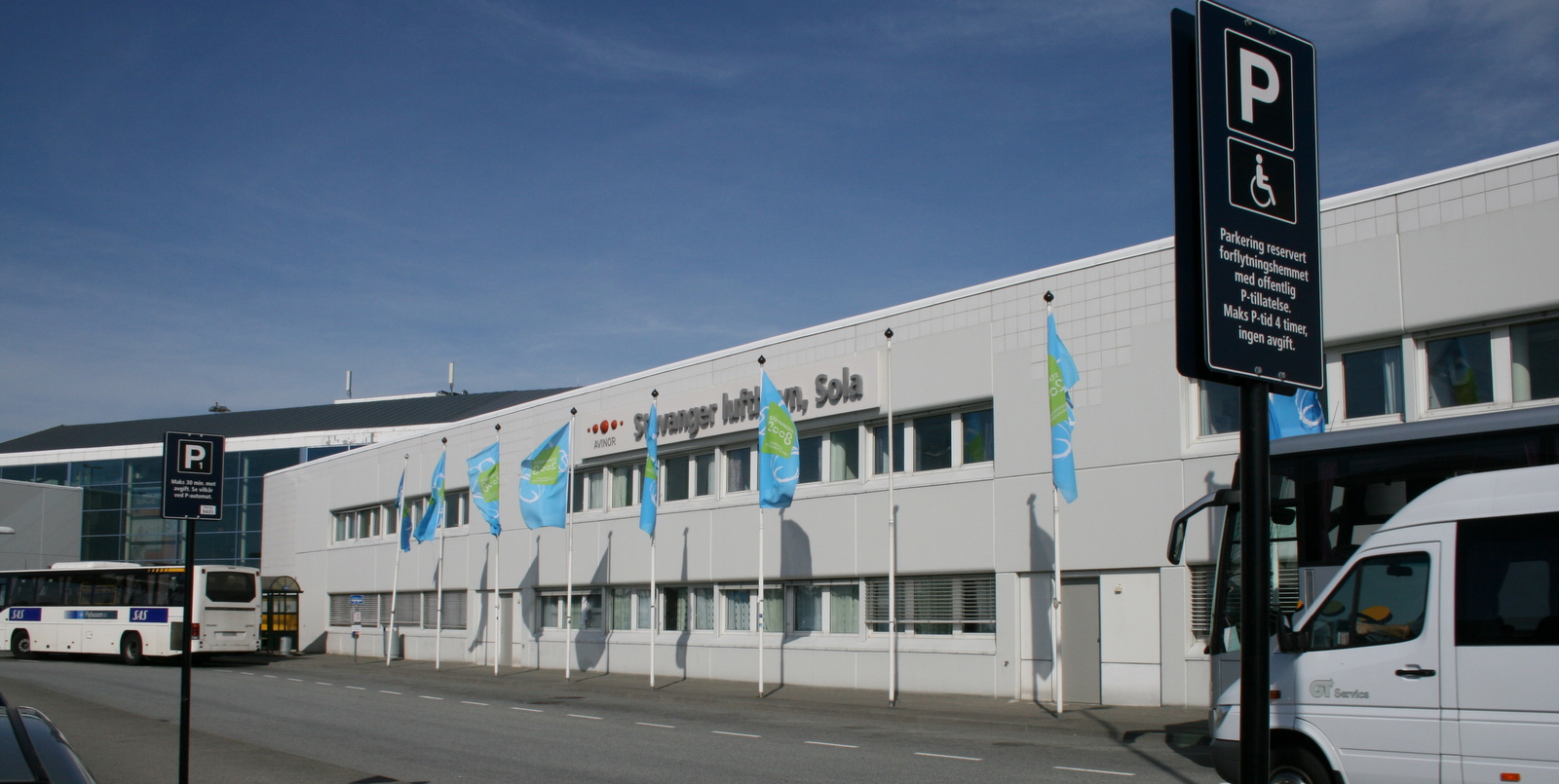
Stavanger Airport Sola, terminal

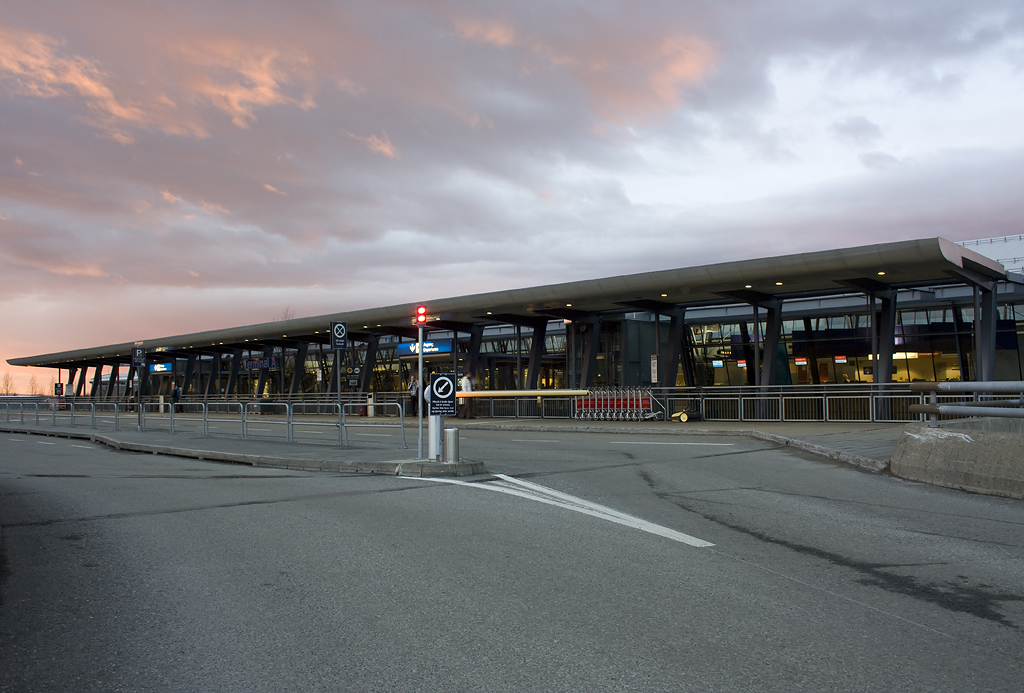
Trondheim Airport Værnes, terminal

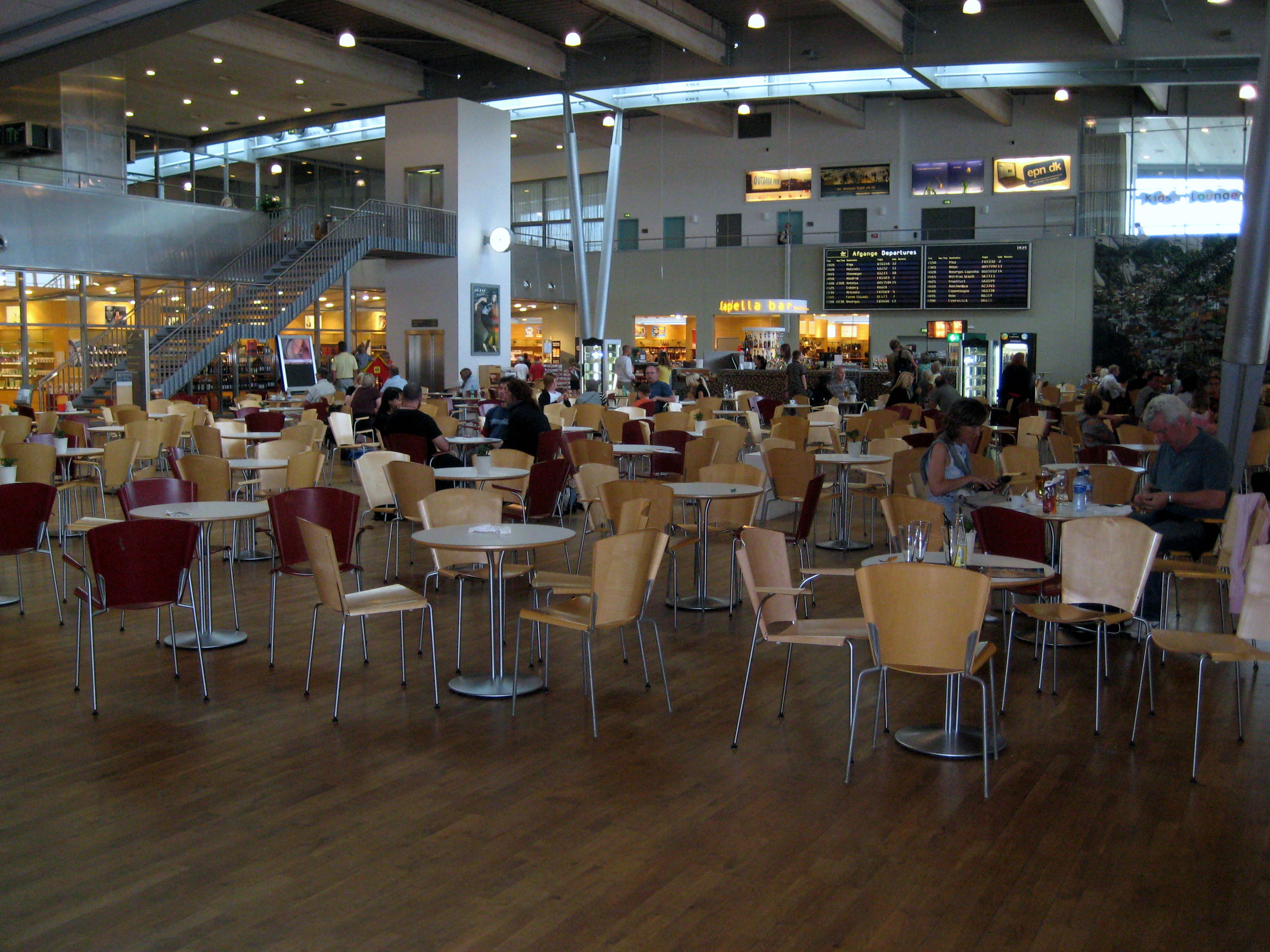
Billund Airport, Capella Bar in terminal

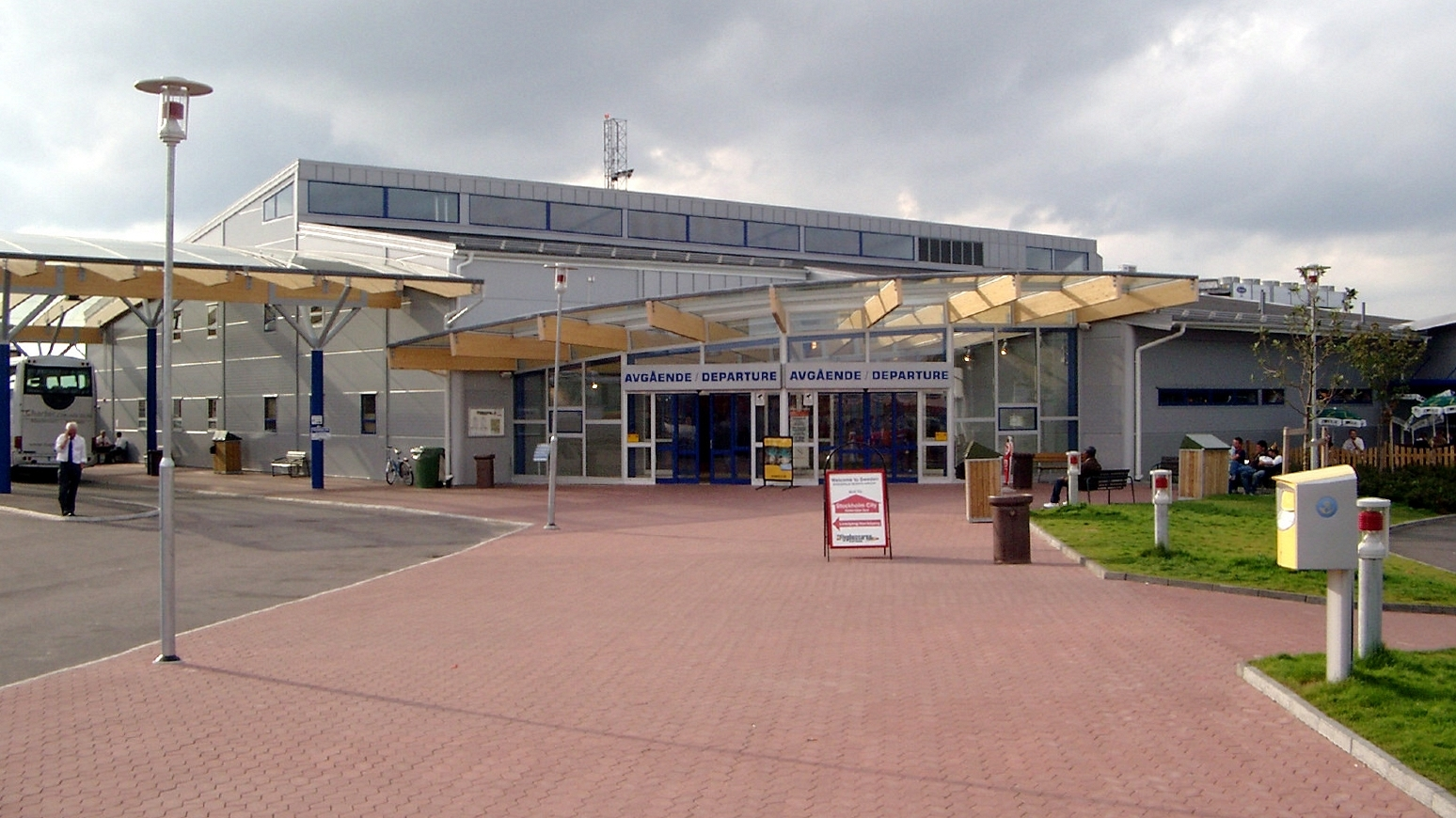
Stockholm Skavsta Airport, terminal entrance

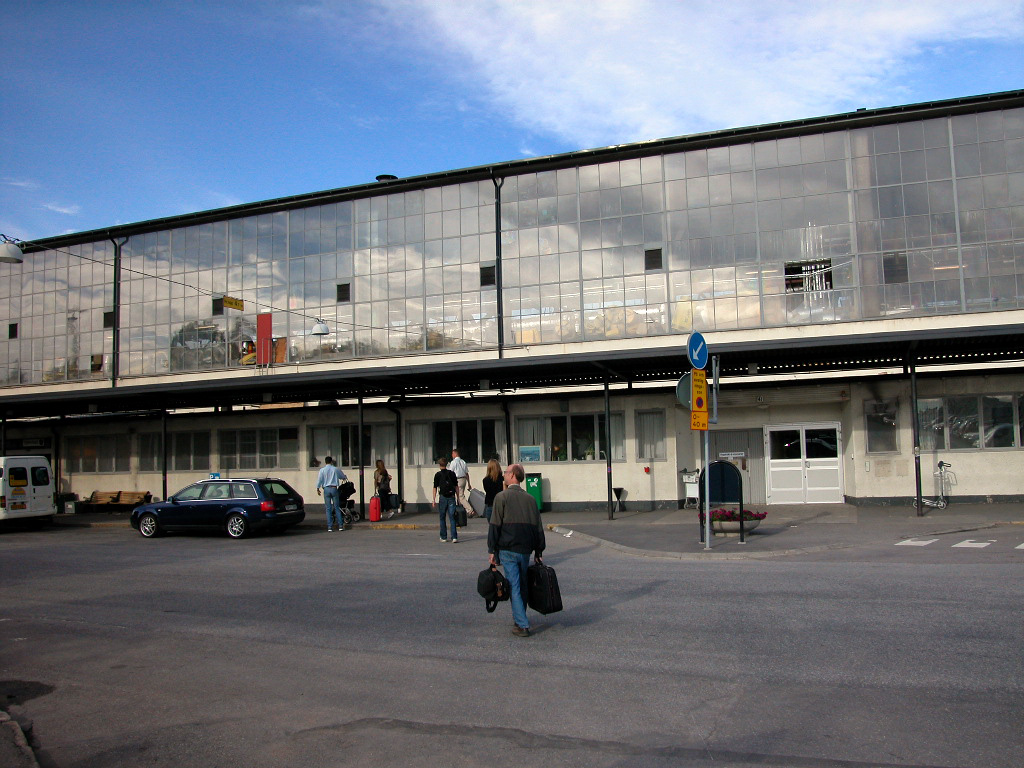
Stockholm Bromma Airport, terminal entrance

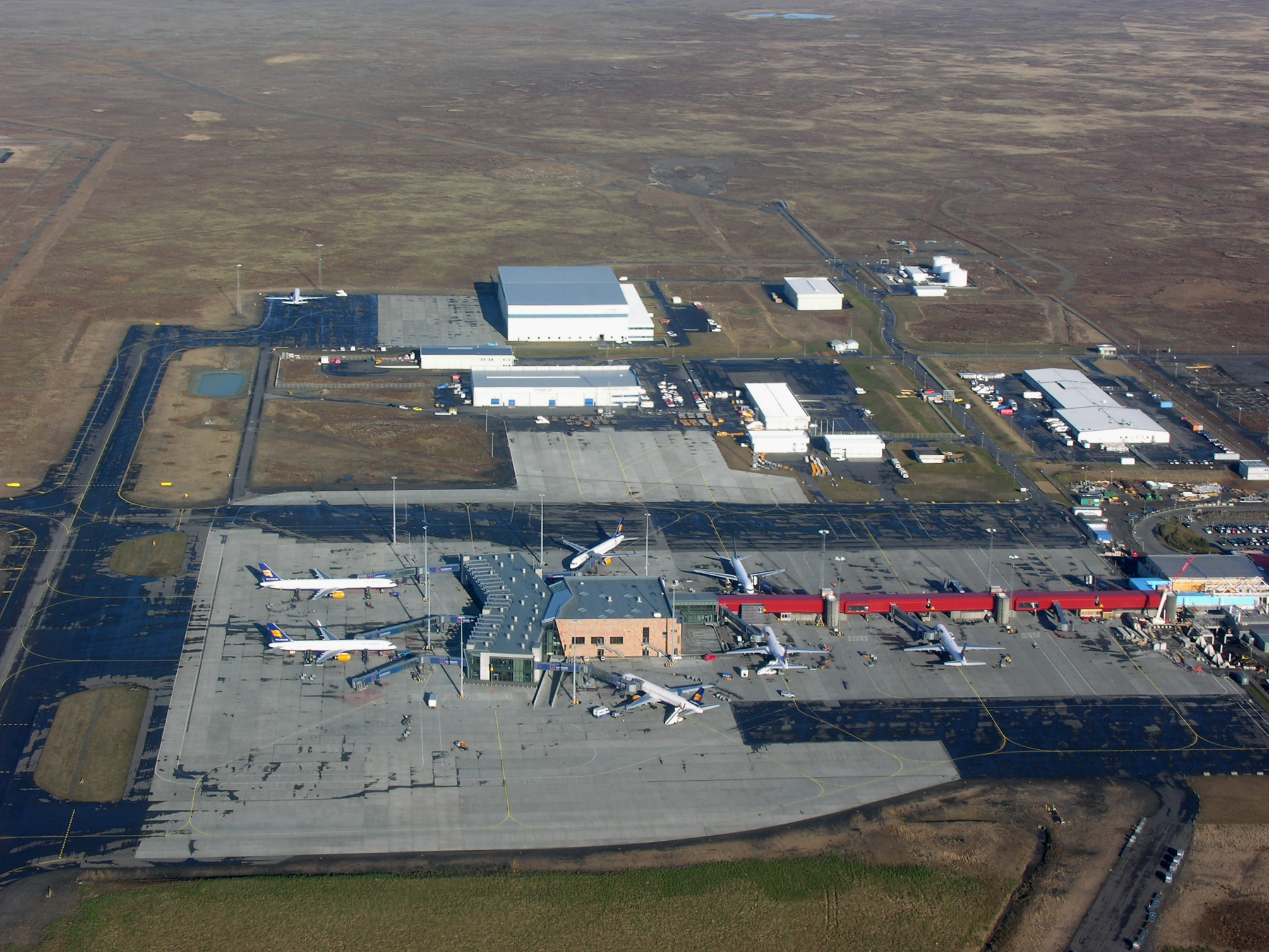
Keflavík International Airport, aerial view of terminal

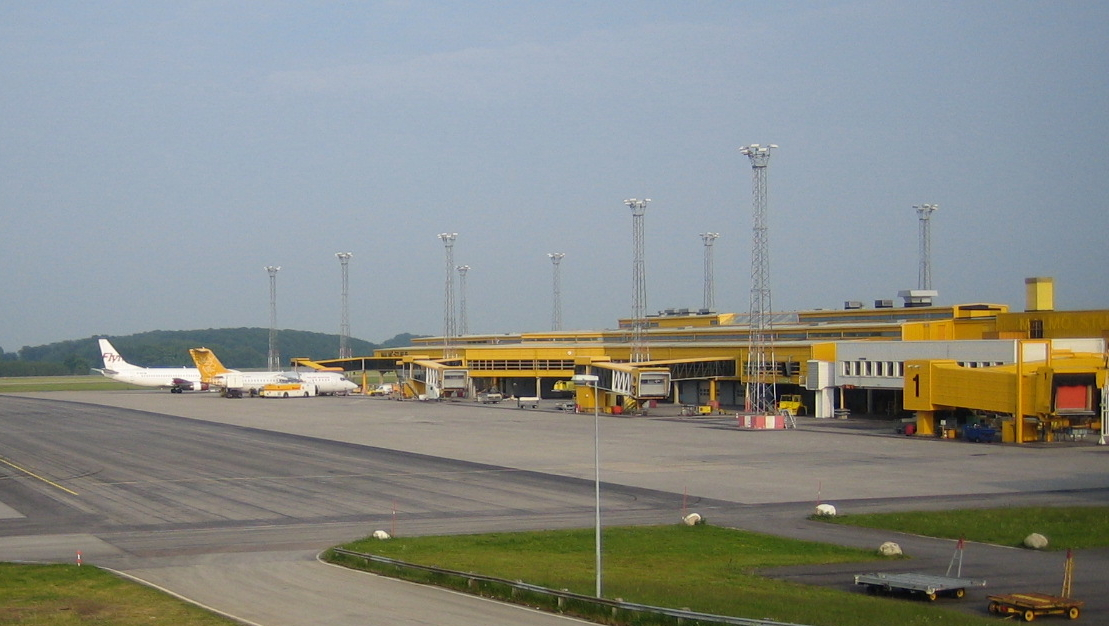
Malmö Airport, terminal from domestic side

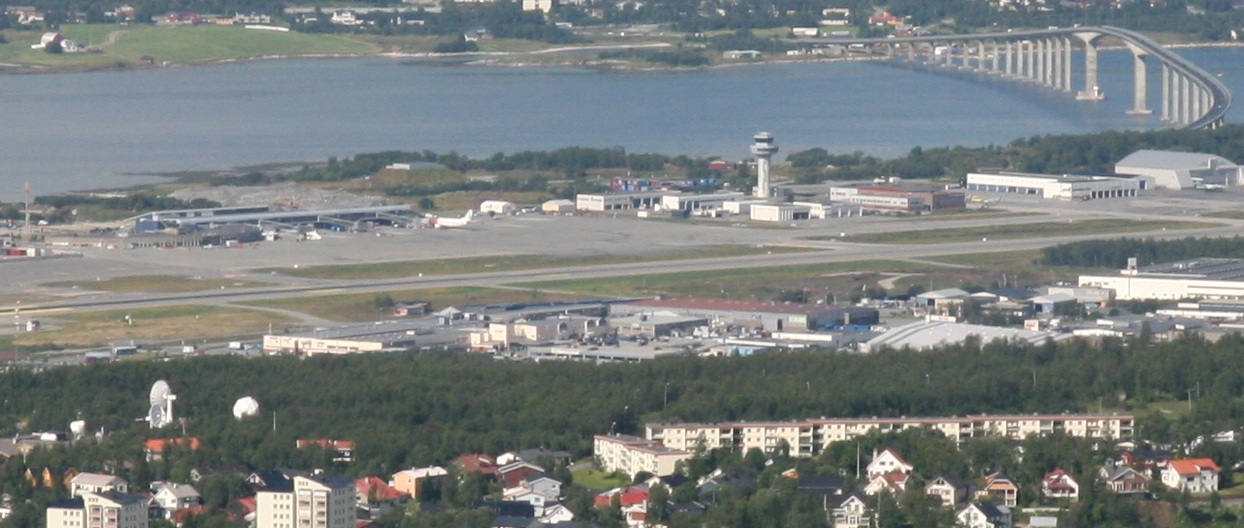
Tromsø Airport Langnes, aerial view

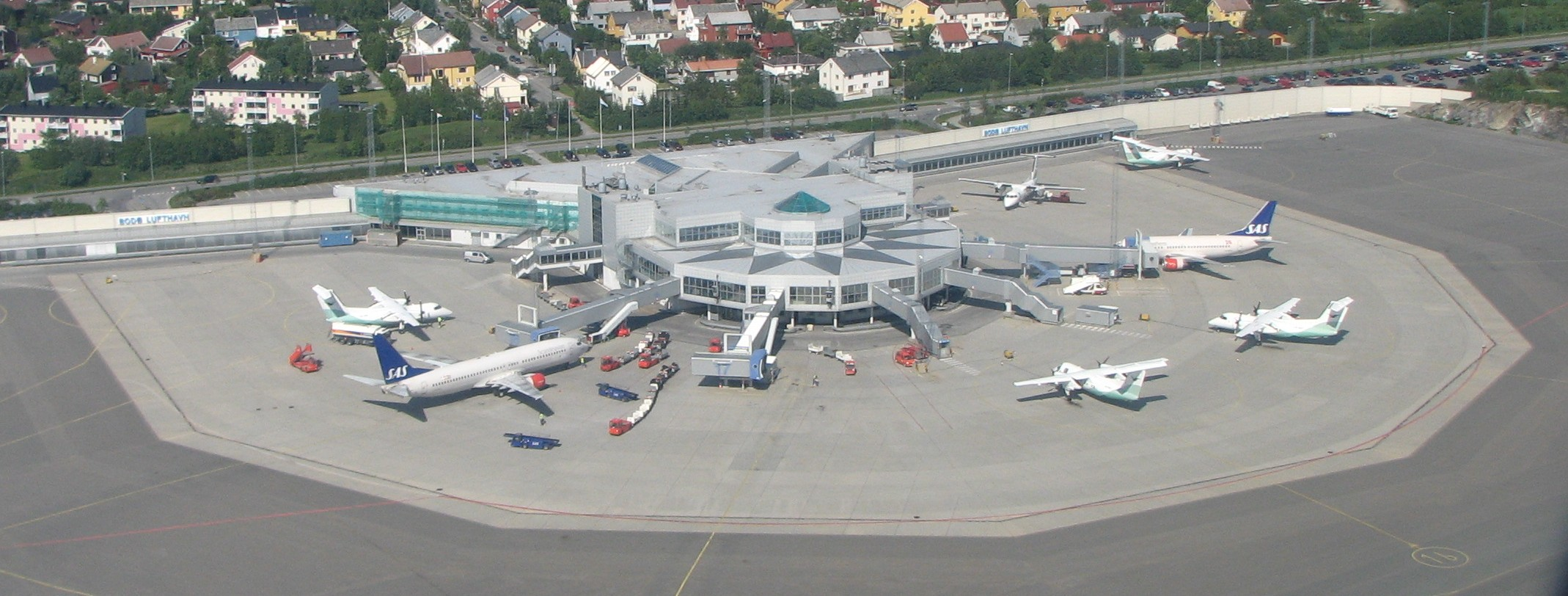
Bodø Airport, aerial view

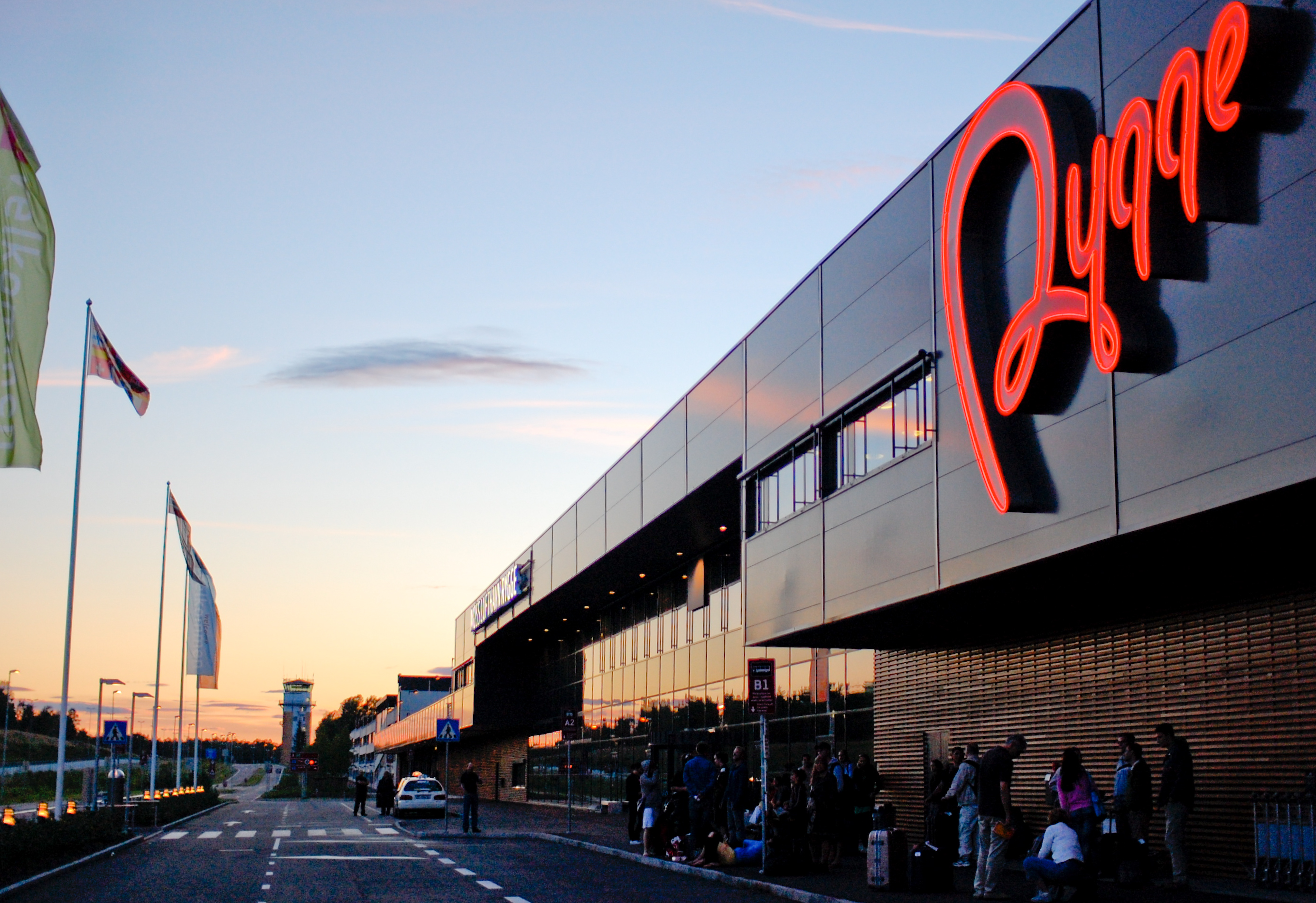
Moss Airport Rygge, terminal

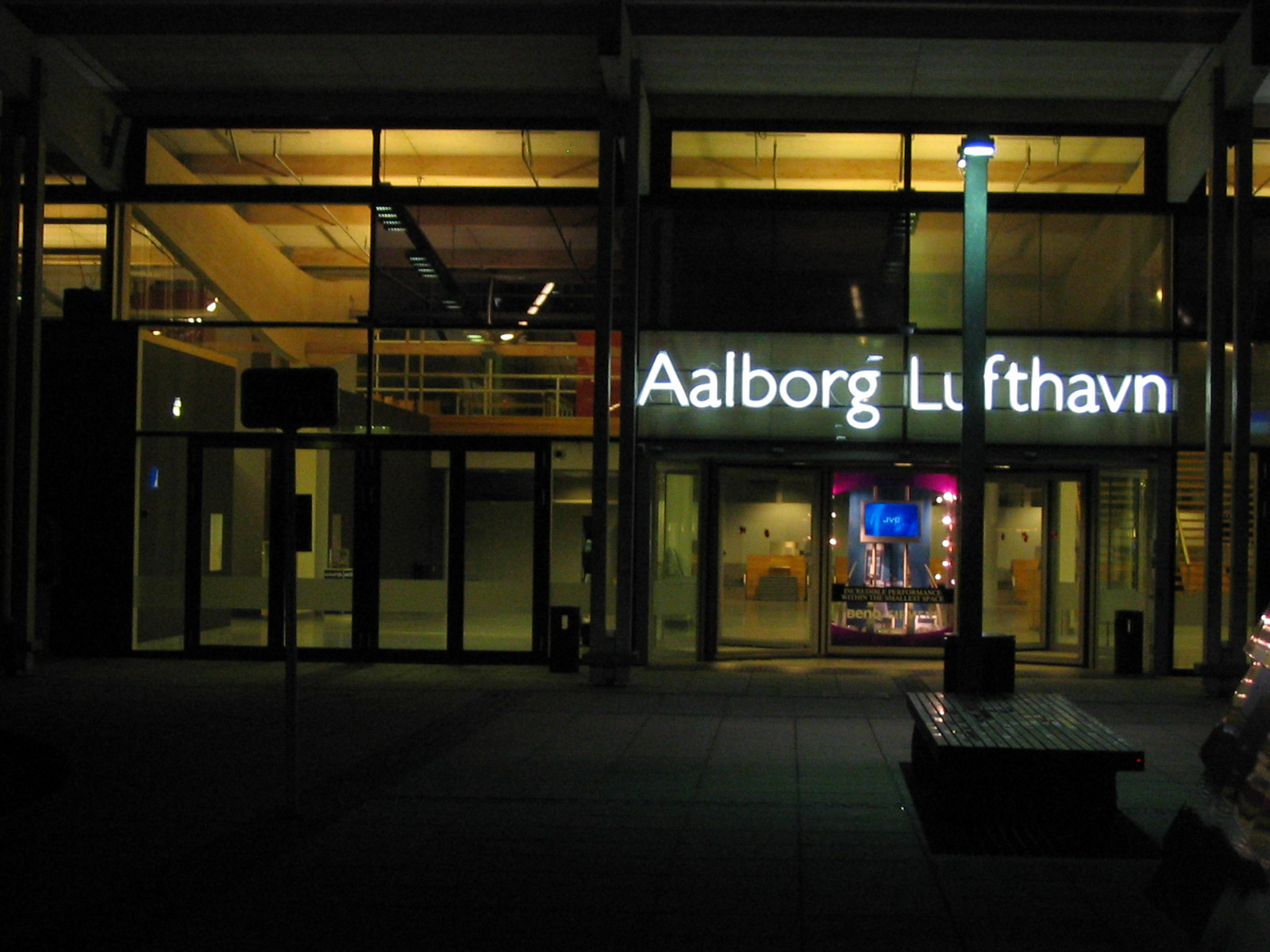
Aalborg Airport, terminal entrance

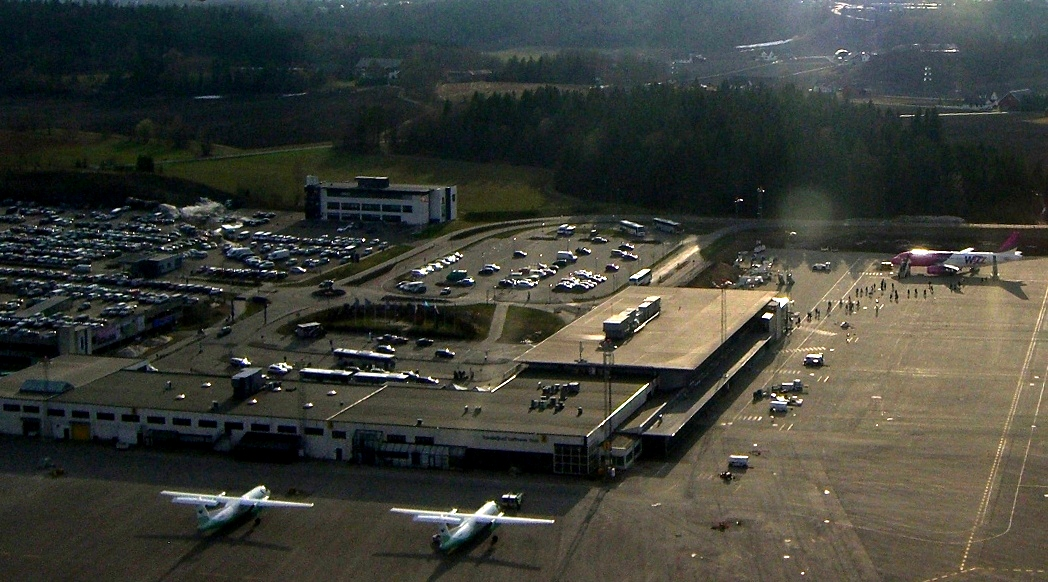
Torp Sandefjord Airport, aerial view

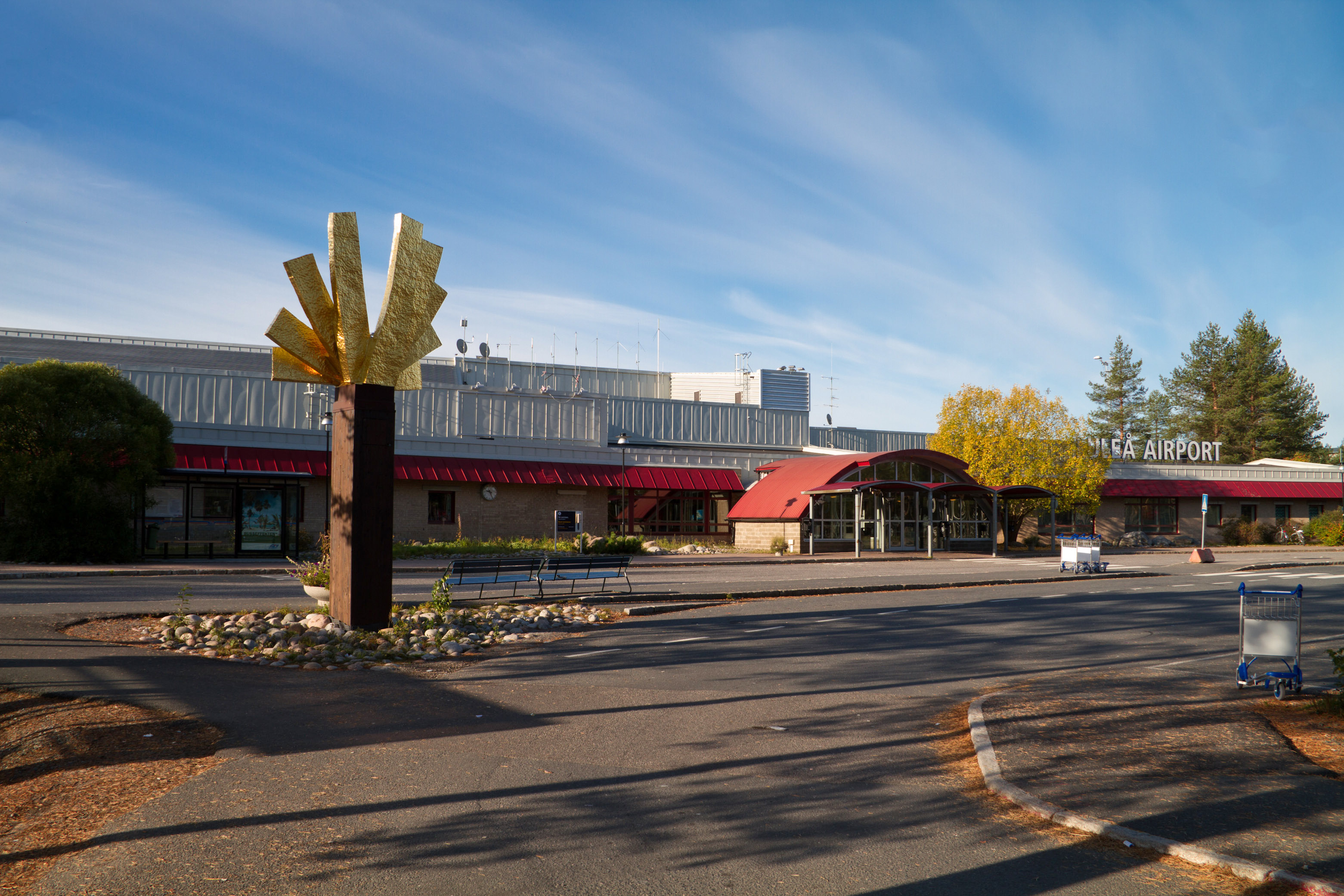
Luleå Airport, terminal entrance

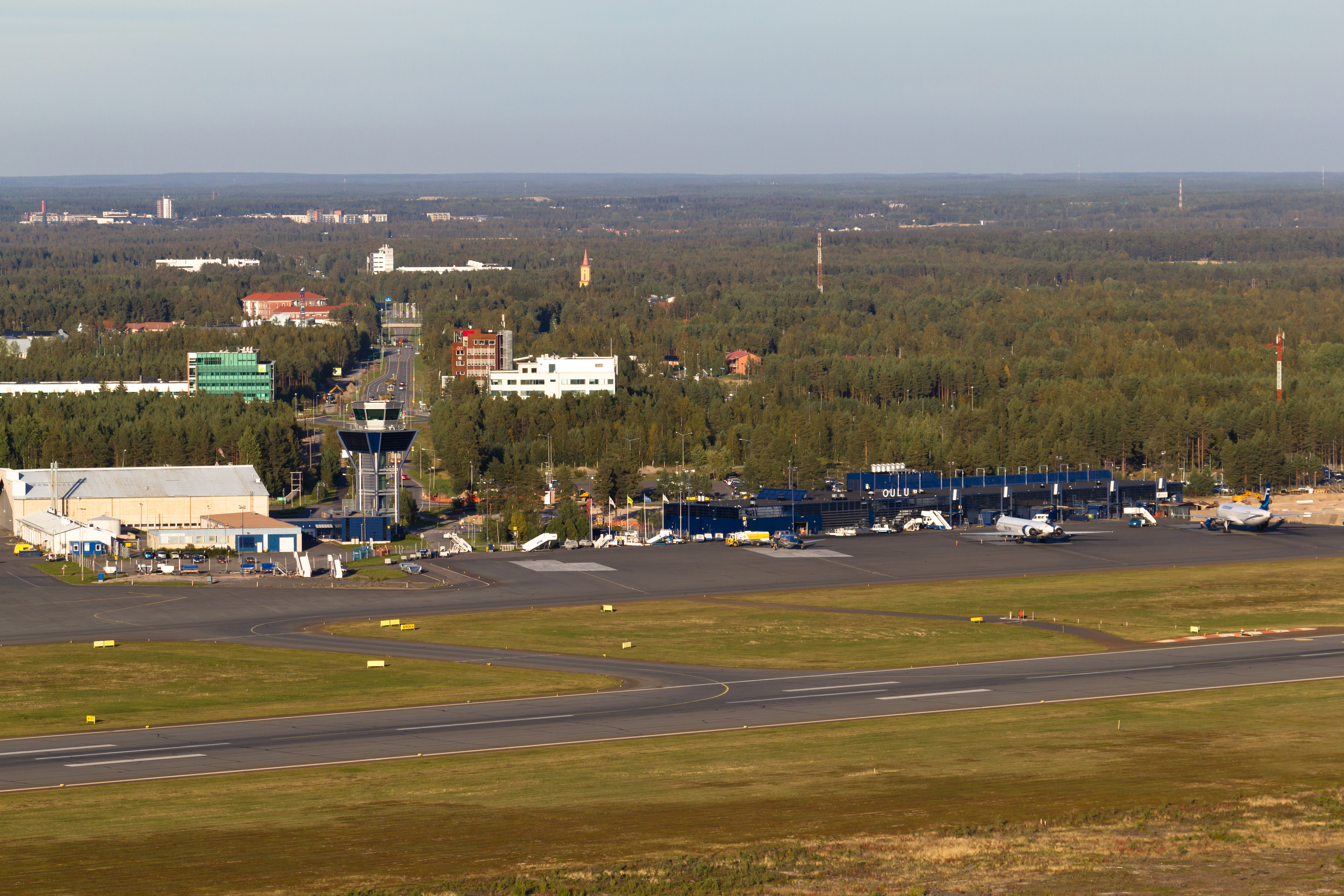
Oulu Airport, terminal overview

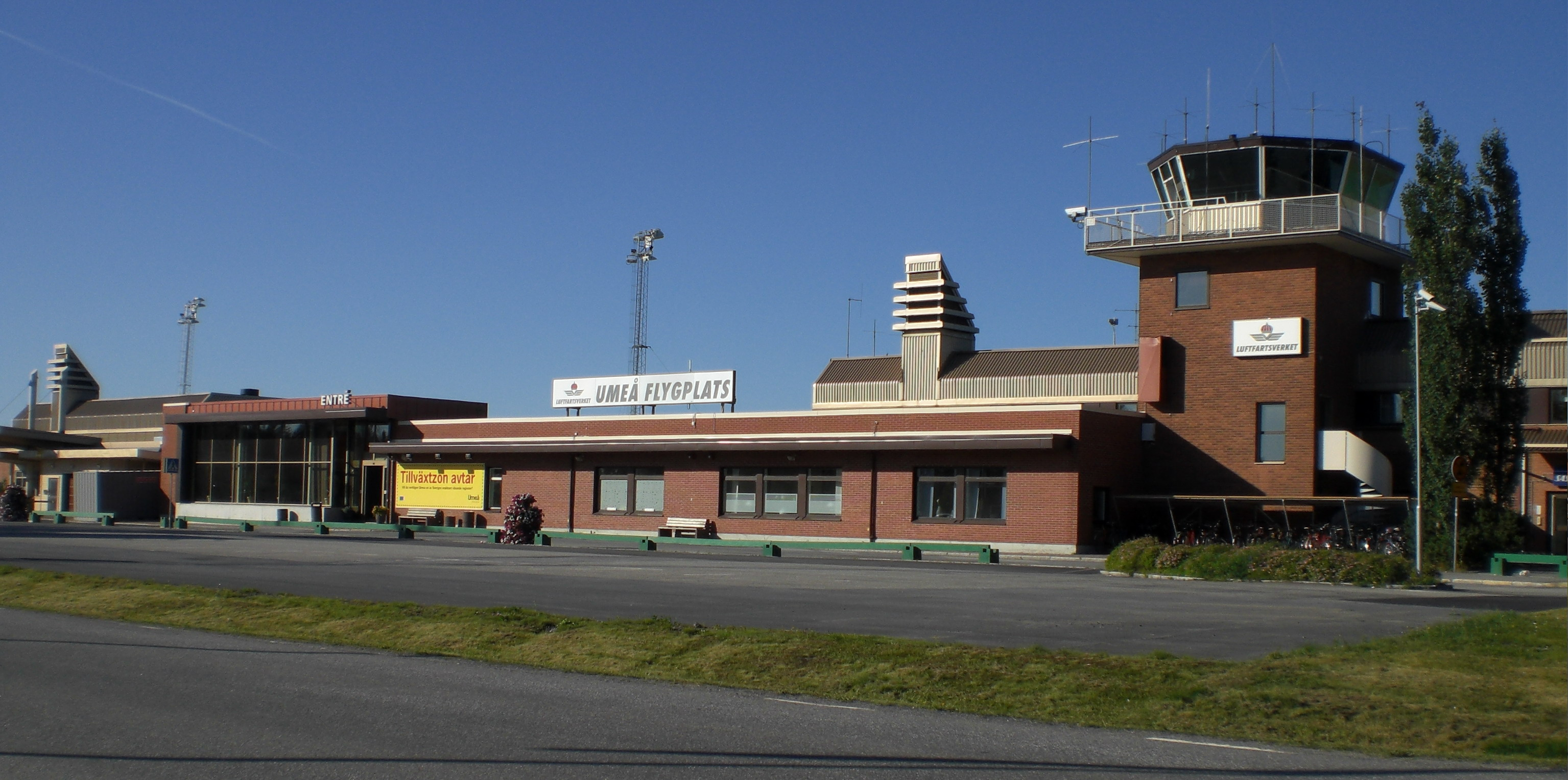
Umeå City Airport, terminal entrance

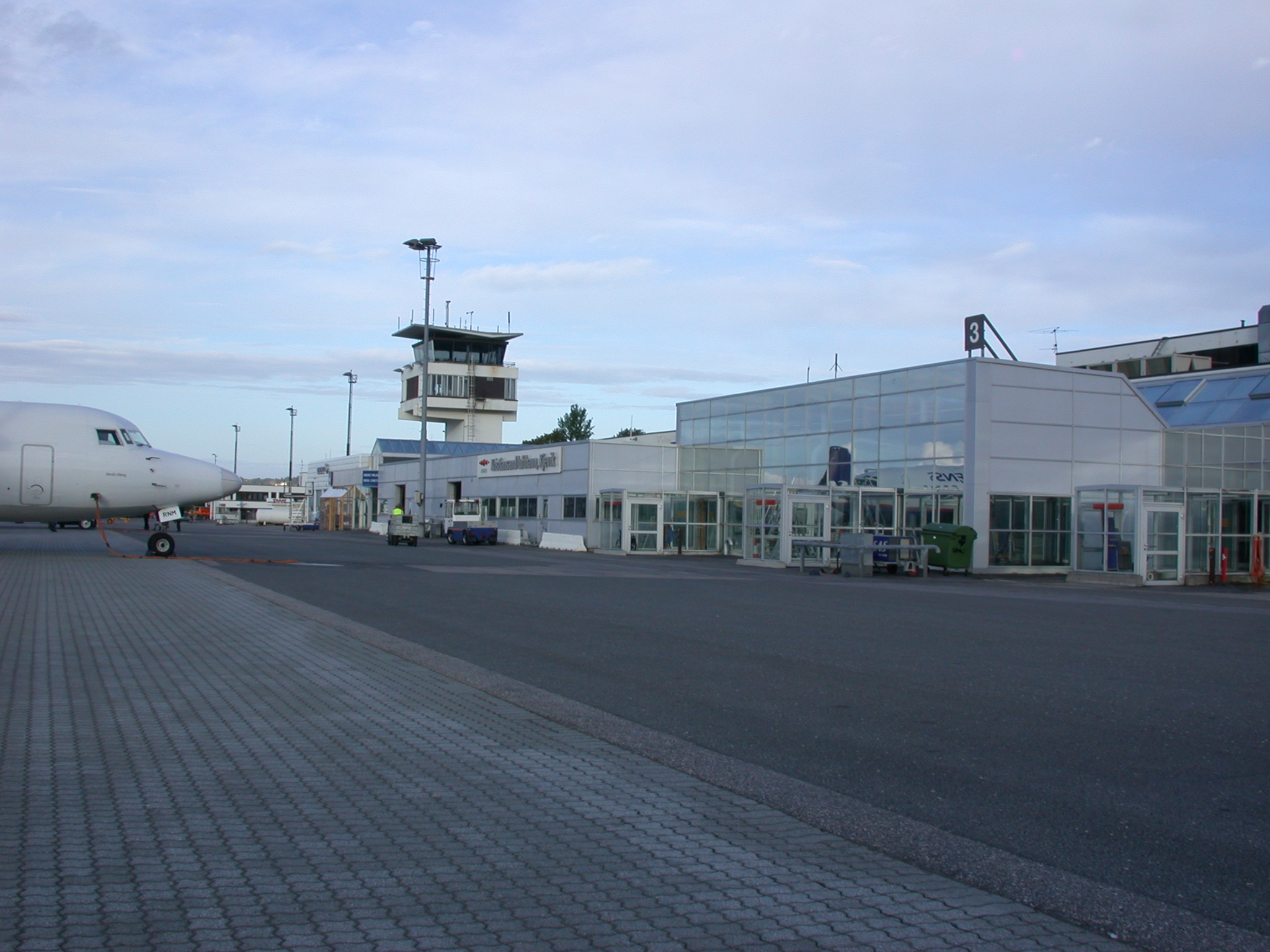
Kristiansand Airport Kjevik, apron view

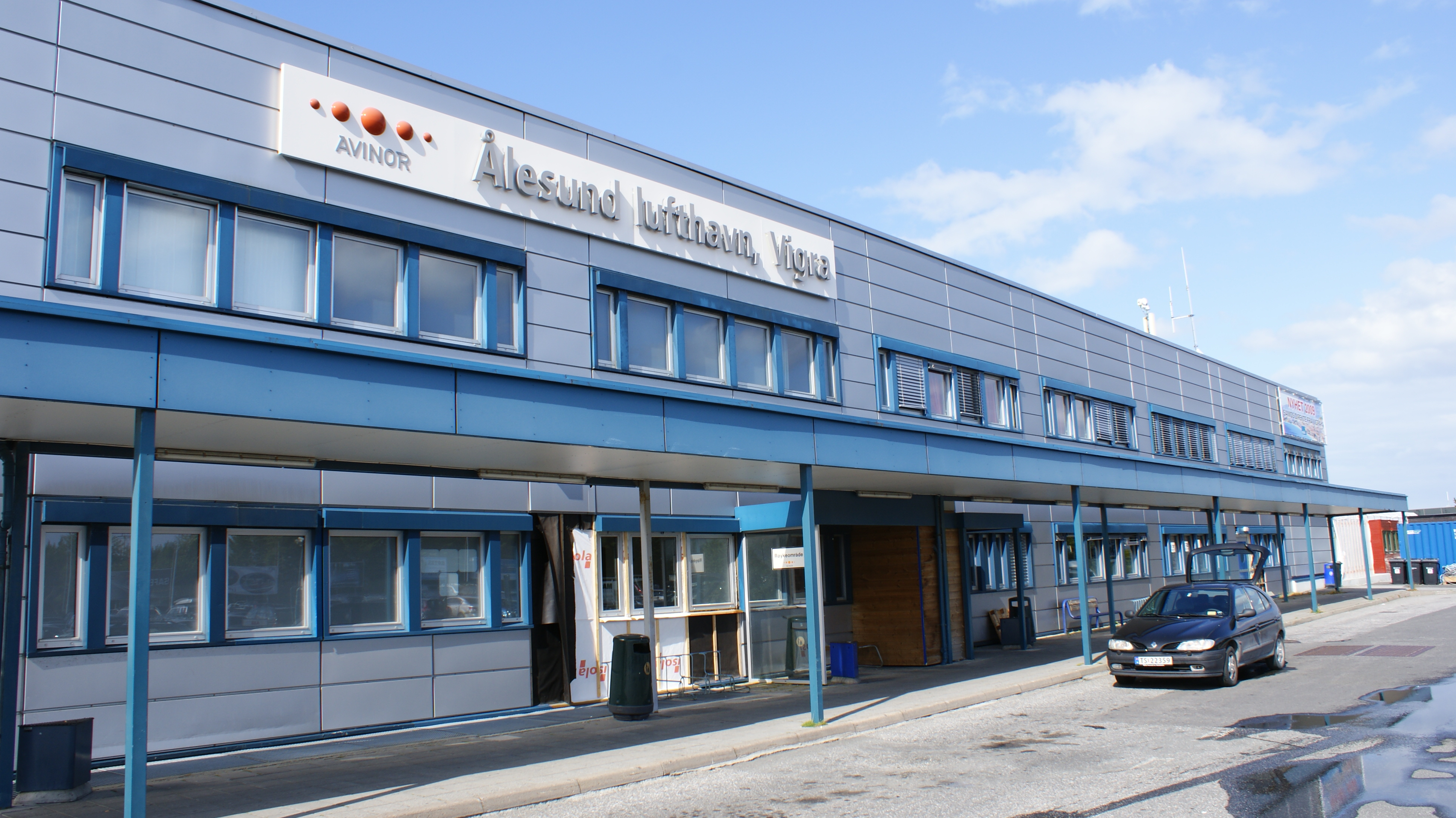
Ålesund Airport Vigra, terminal entrance

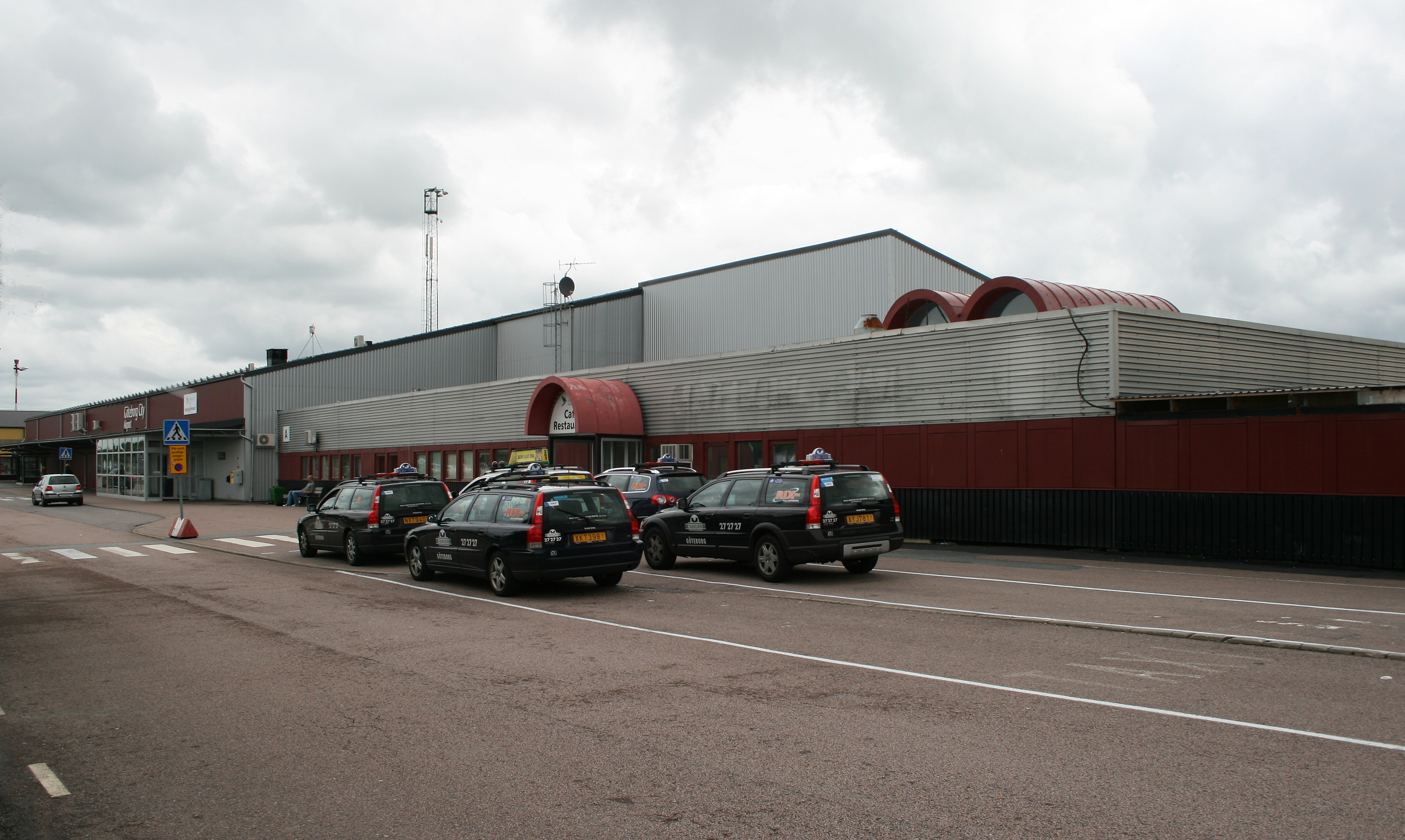
Göteborg City Airport, taxi line at terminal

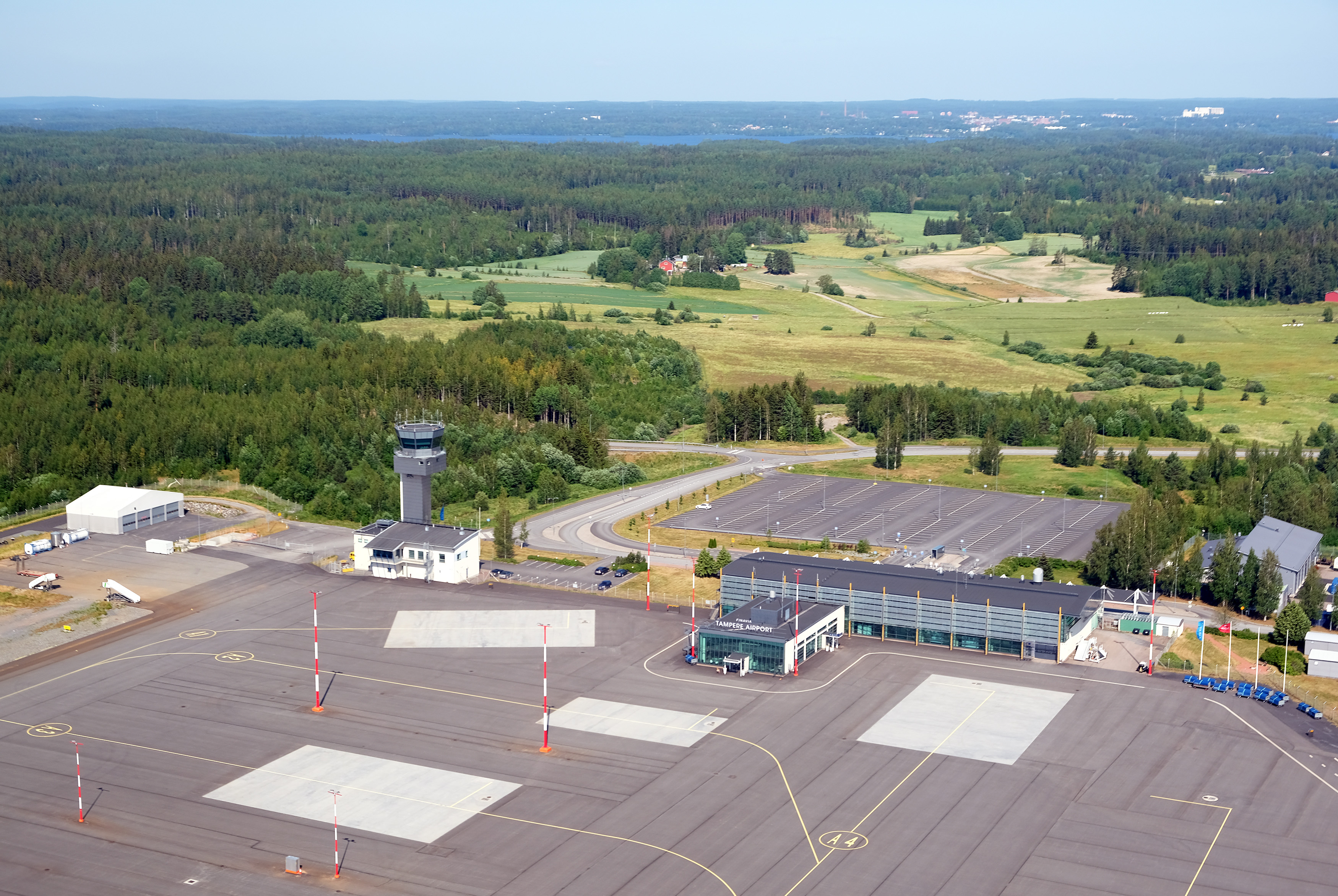
Tampere-Pirkkala Airport, terminal overview

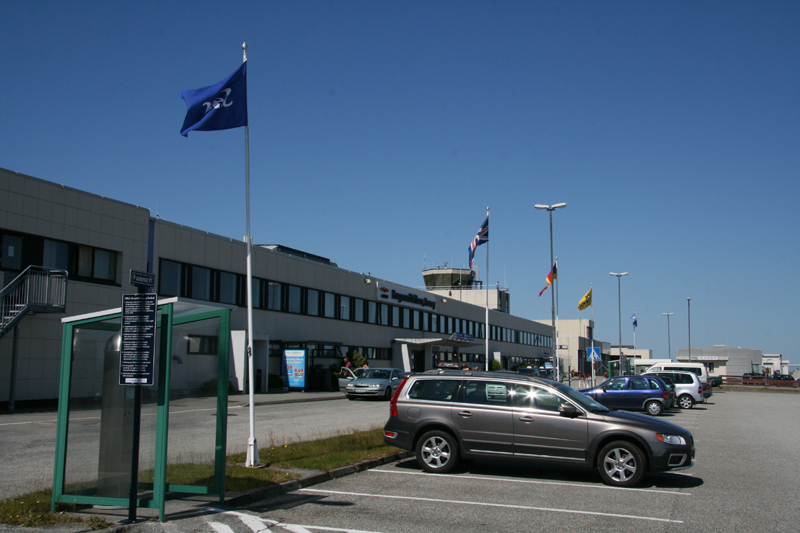
Haugesund Airport Karmøy, parking at terminal

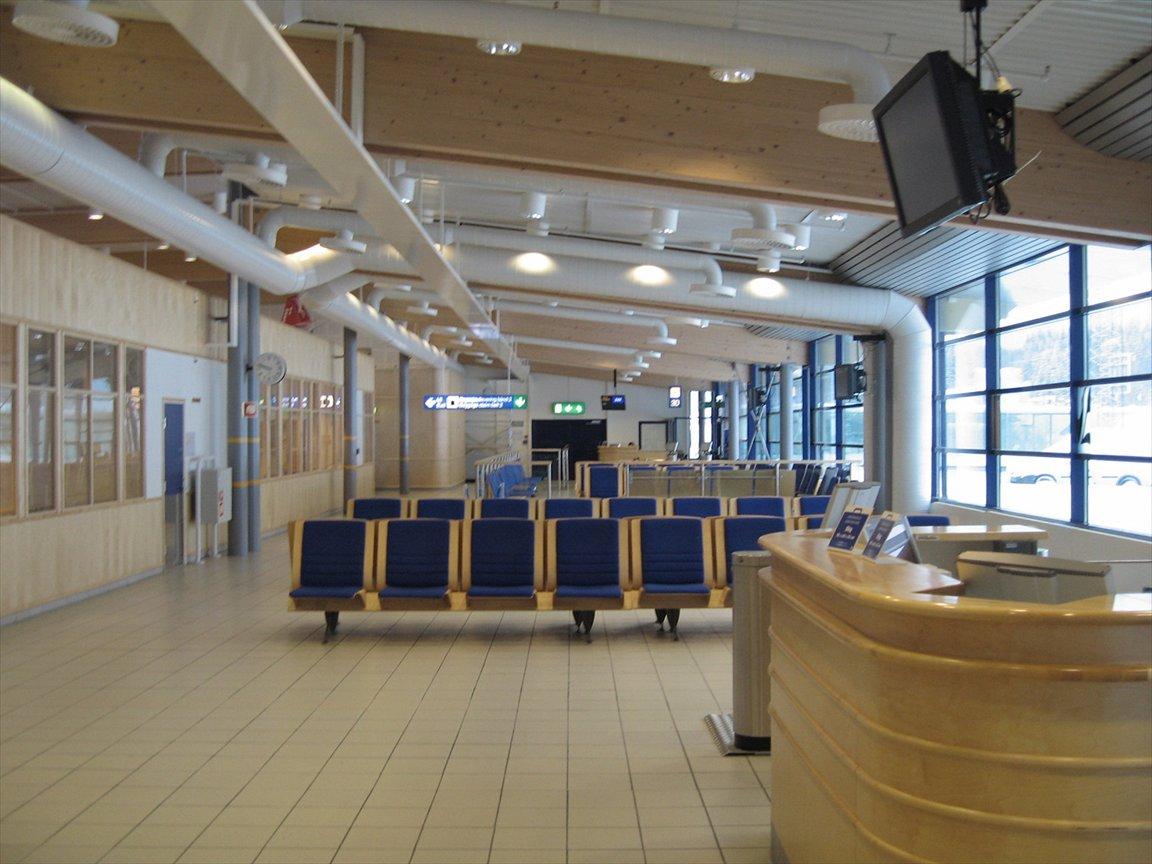
Harstad/Narvik Airport Evenes, terminal at Gate 30

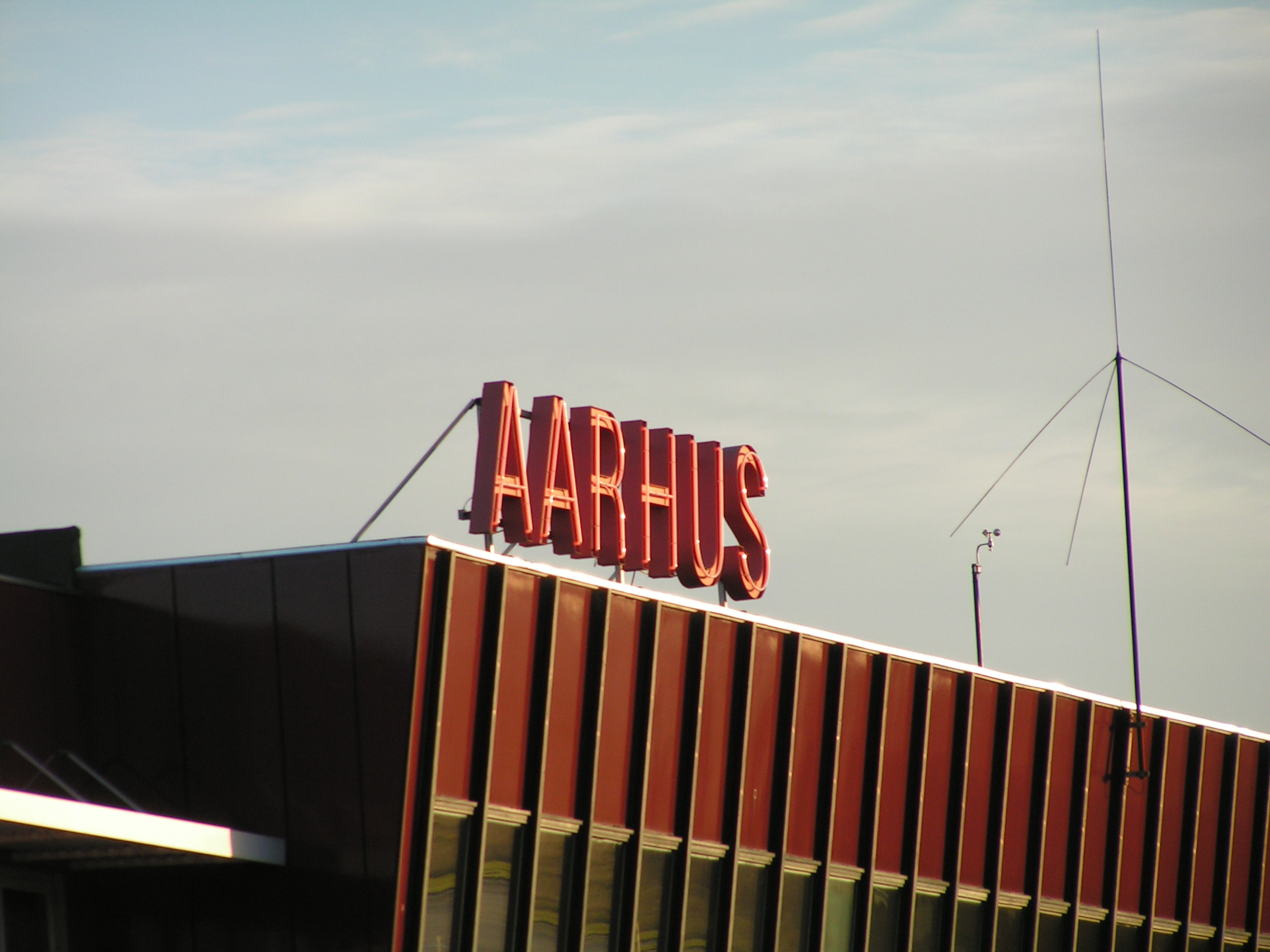
Aarhus Airport, terminal

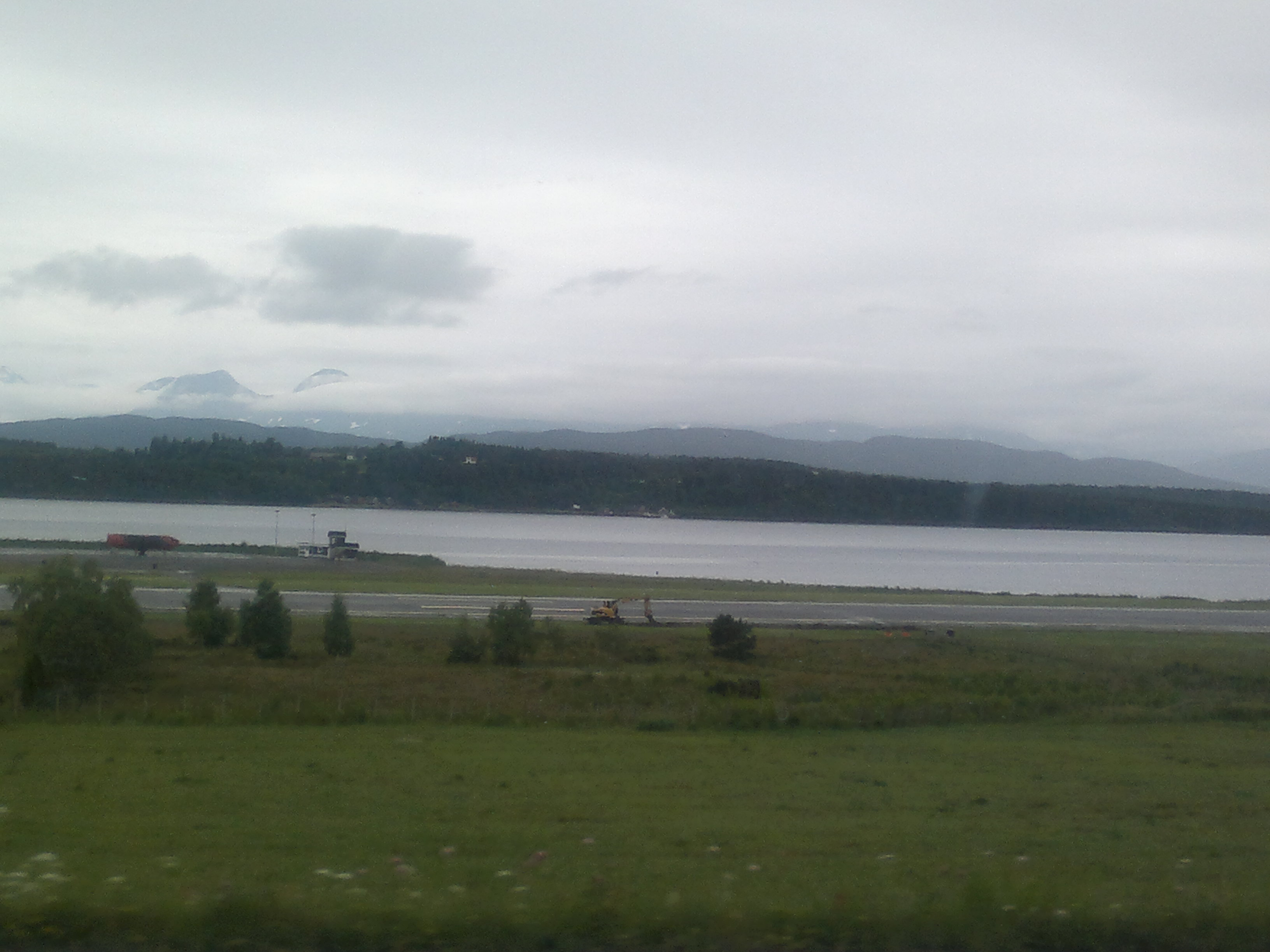
Molde Airport Årø, terminal in background

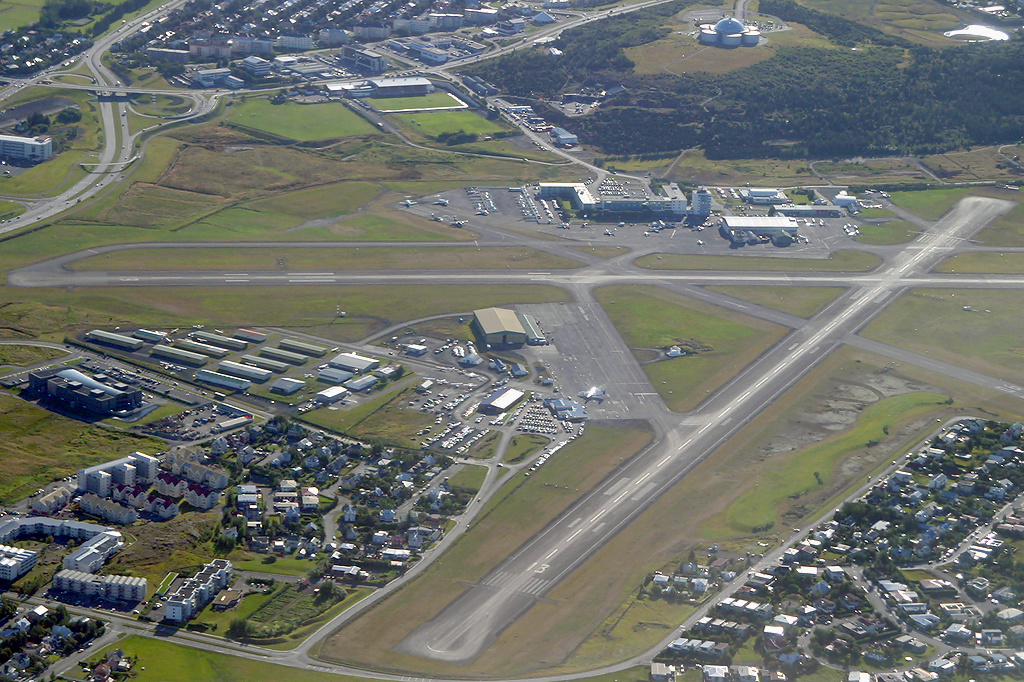
Reykjavík Airport, aerial view

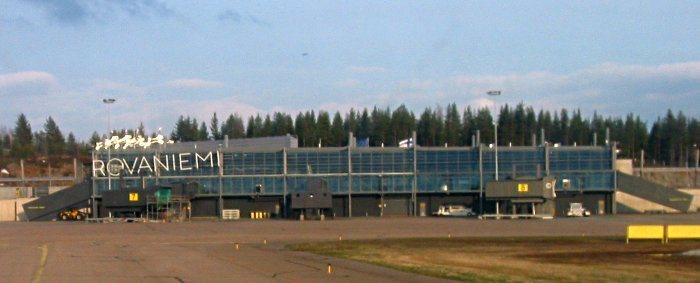
Rovaniemi Airport, terminal

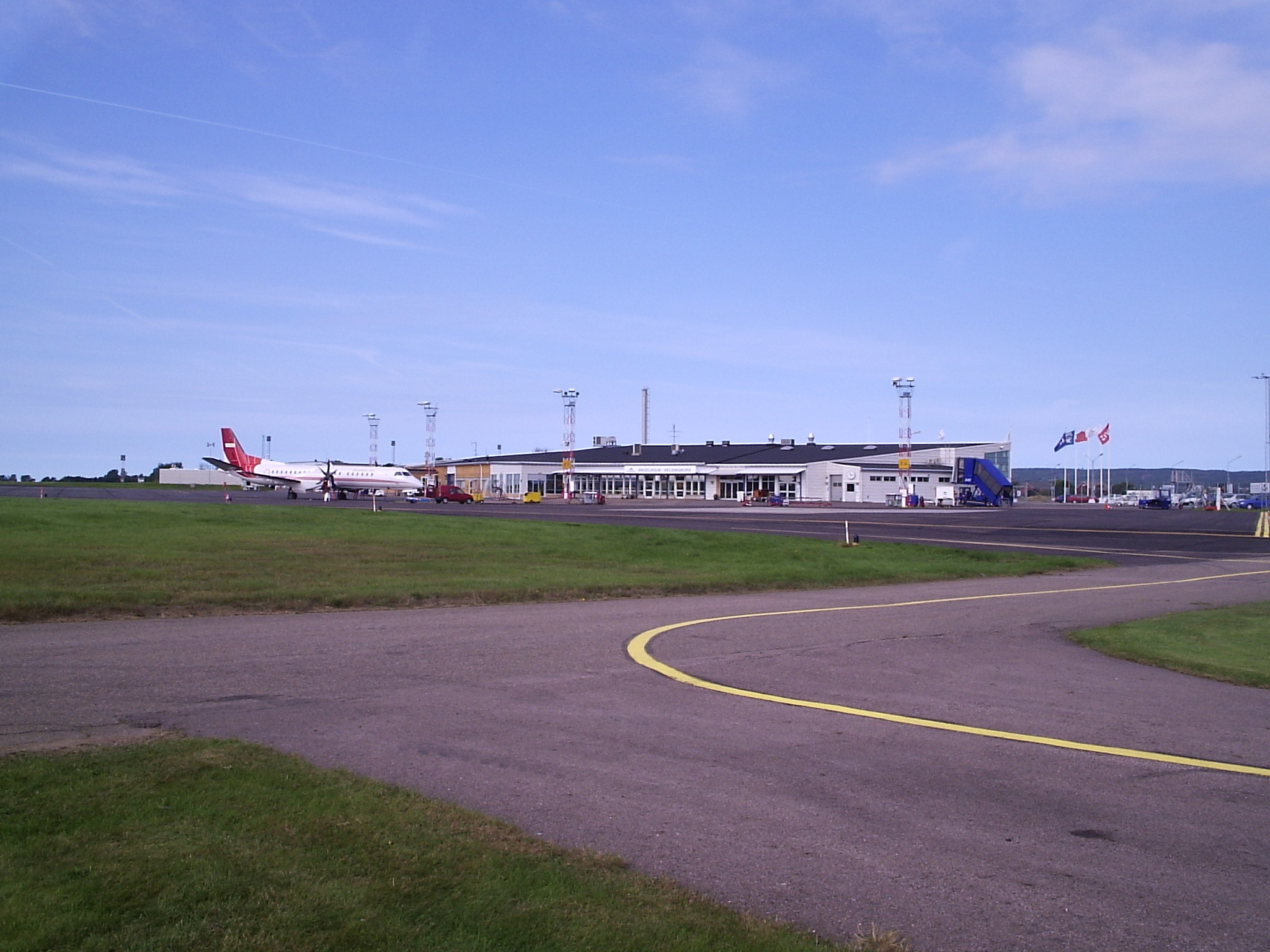
Ängelholm-Helsingborg Airport, terminal view from air aide

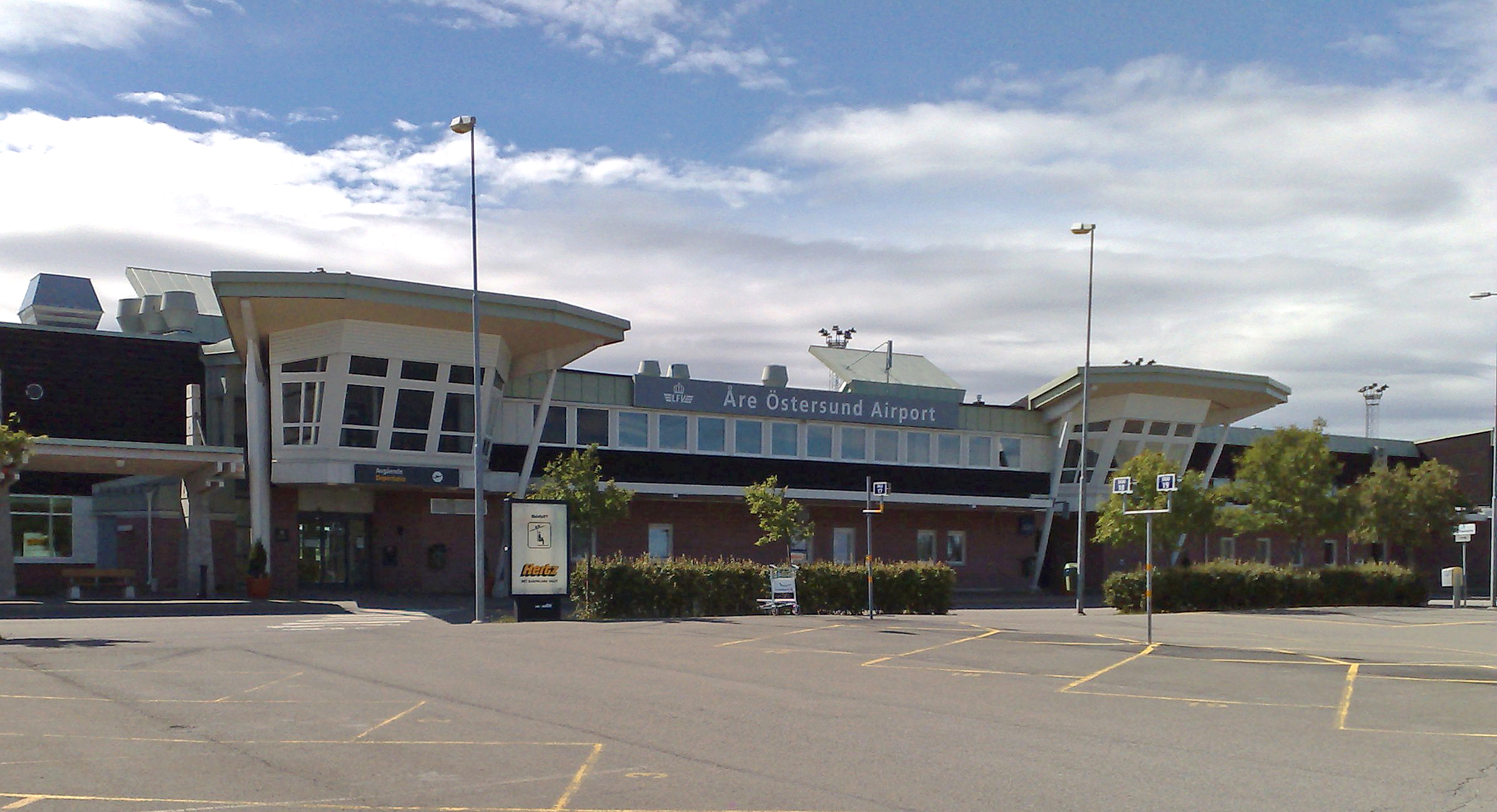
Åre Östersund Airport Airport, terminal view

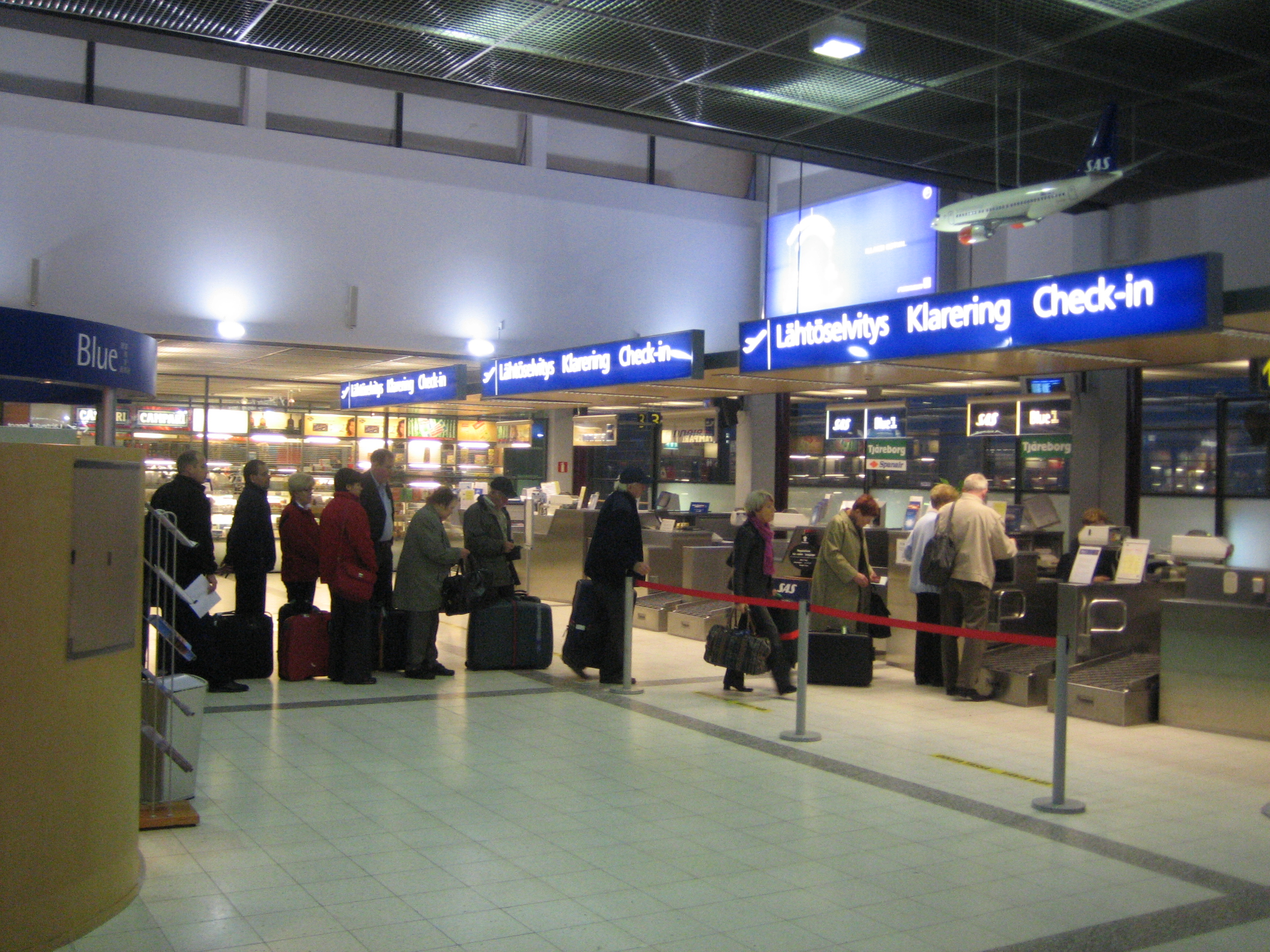
Turku Airport, terminal check-in area

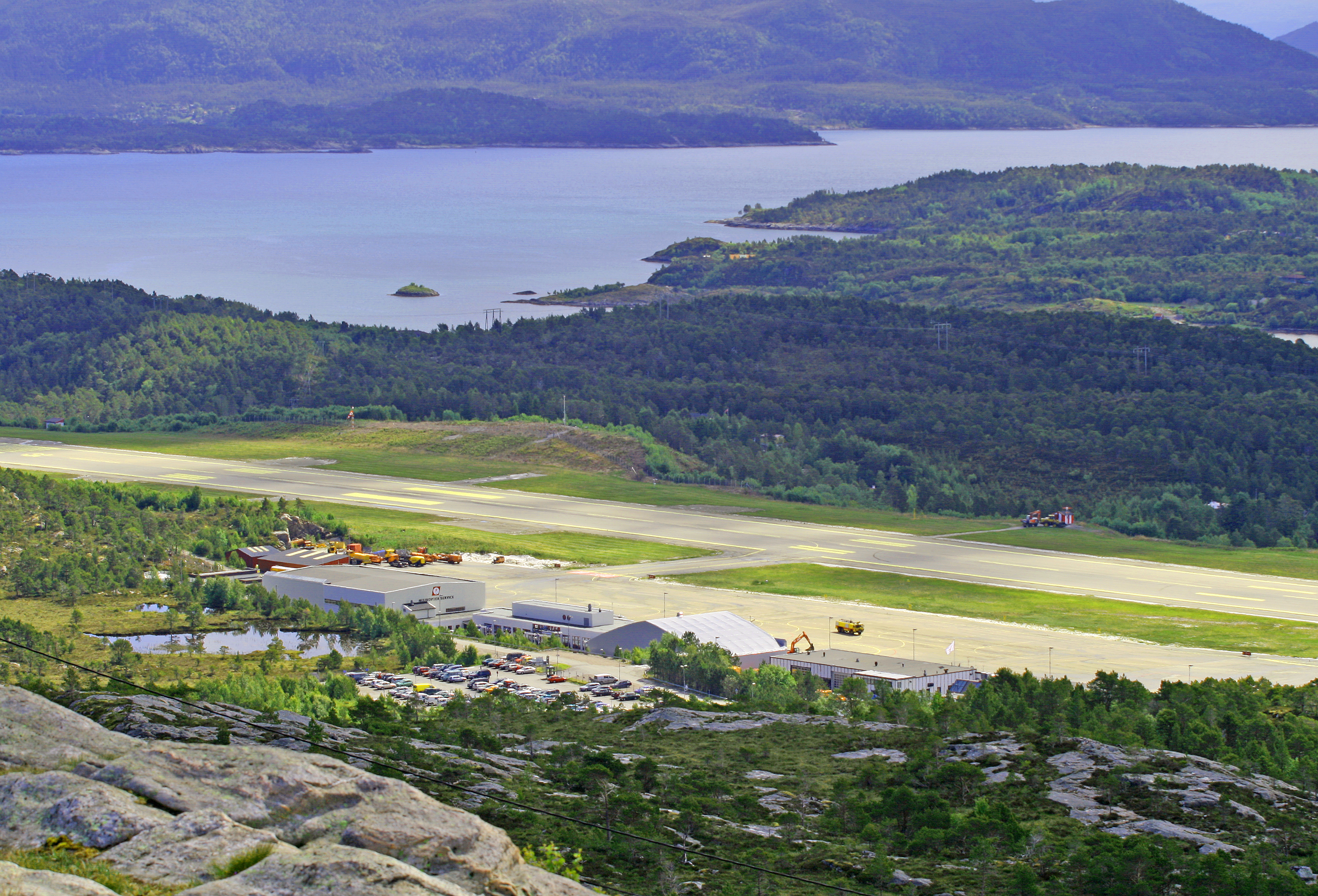
Kristiansund Airport Kvernberget, aerial view

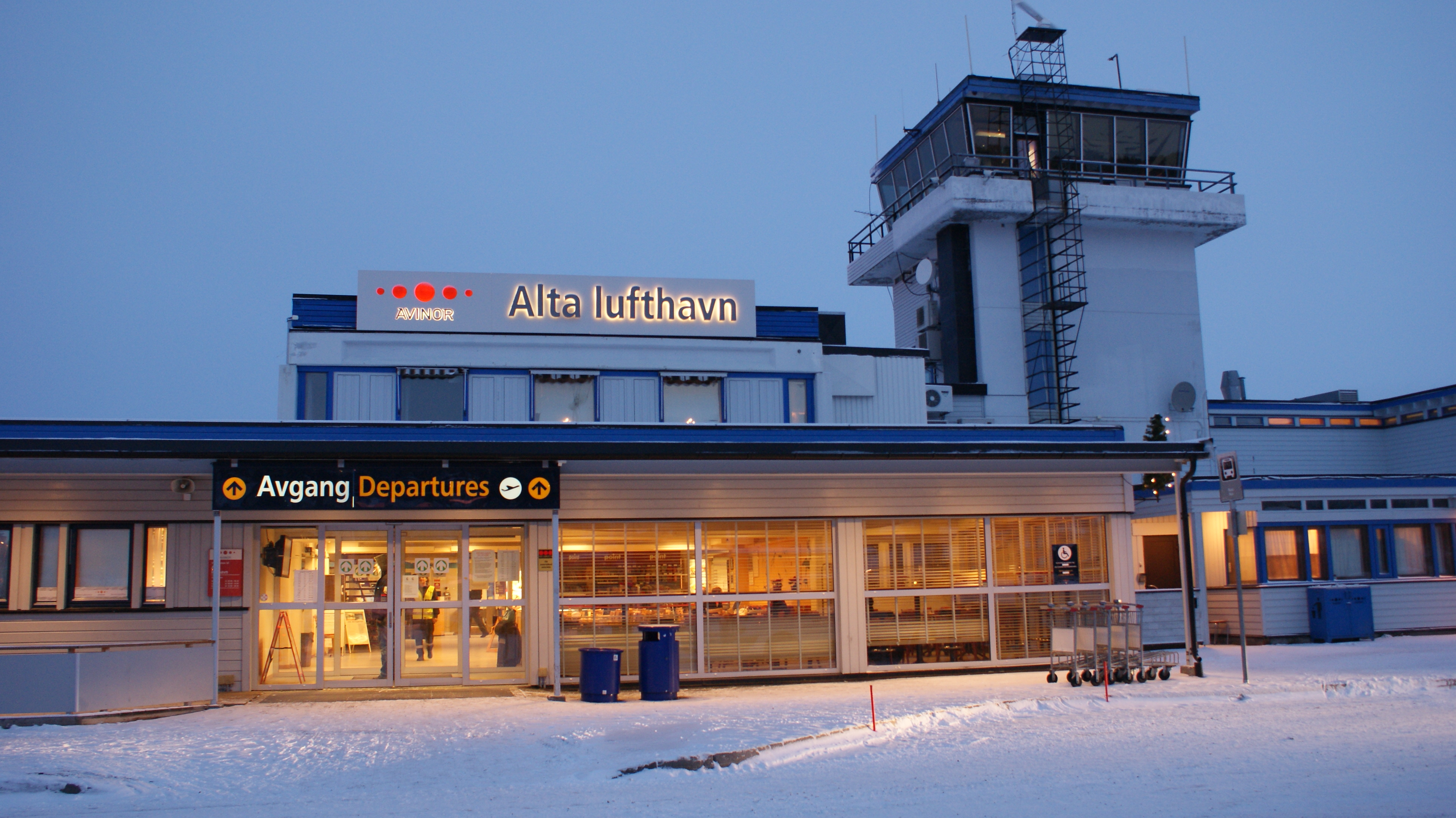
Alta Airport, terminal

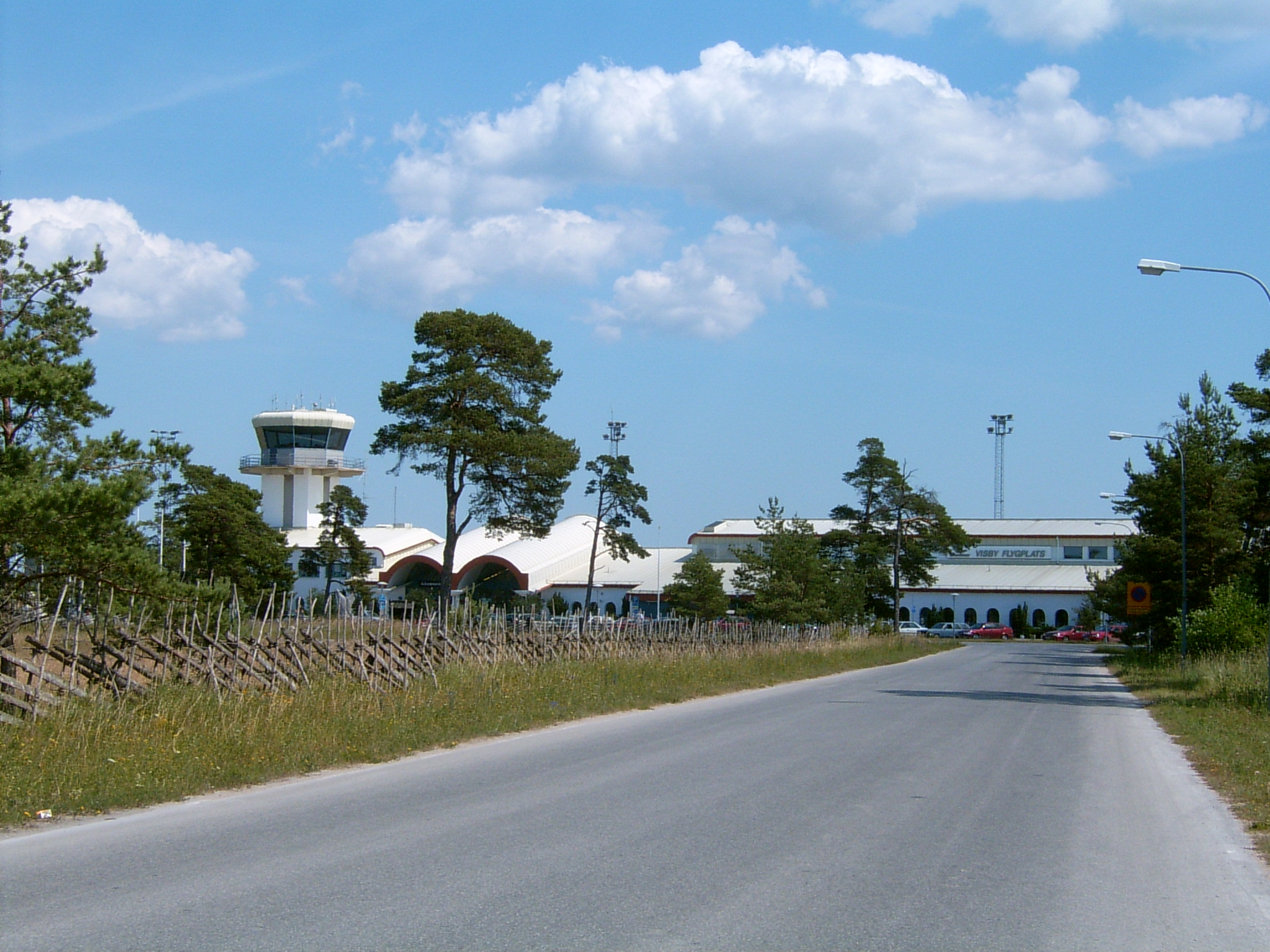
Visby Airport, road to terminal

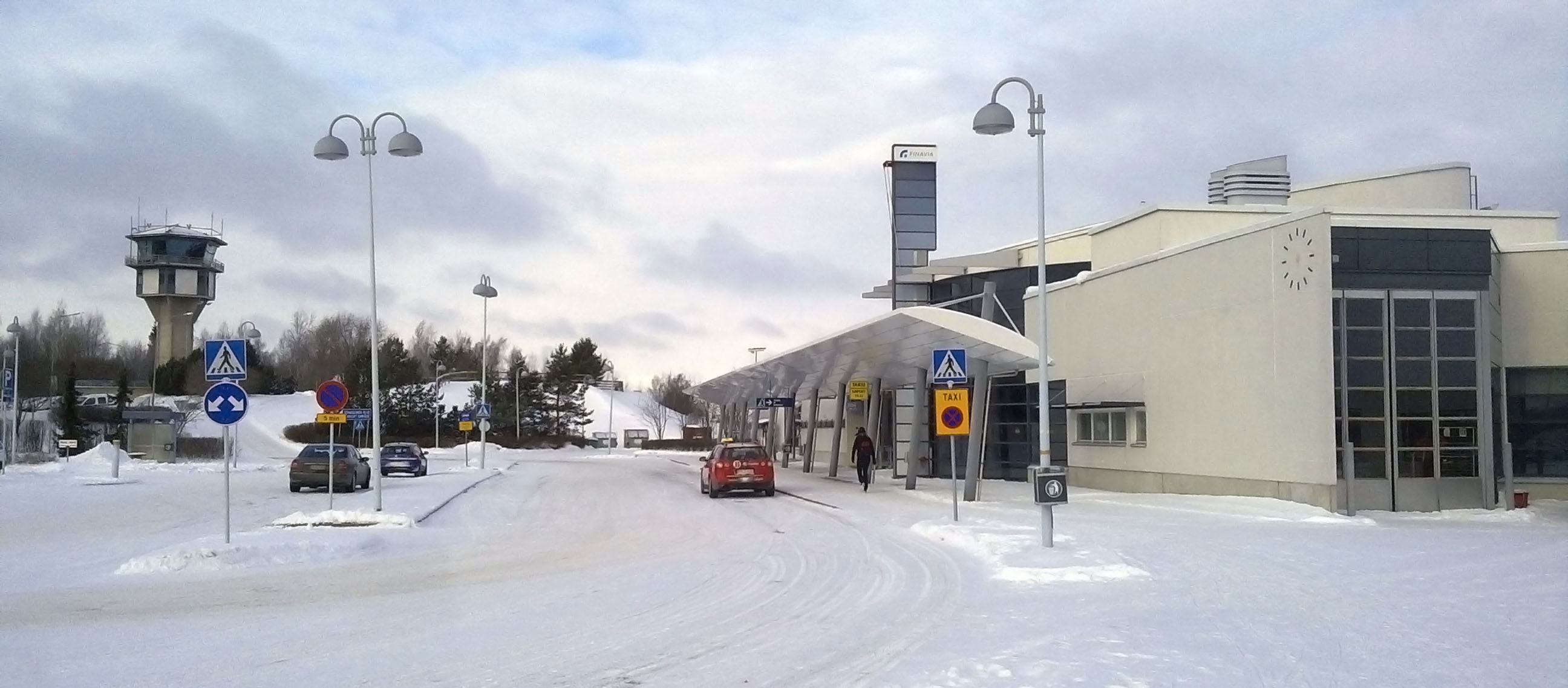
Vaasa Airport, terminal land side

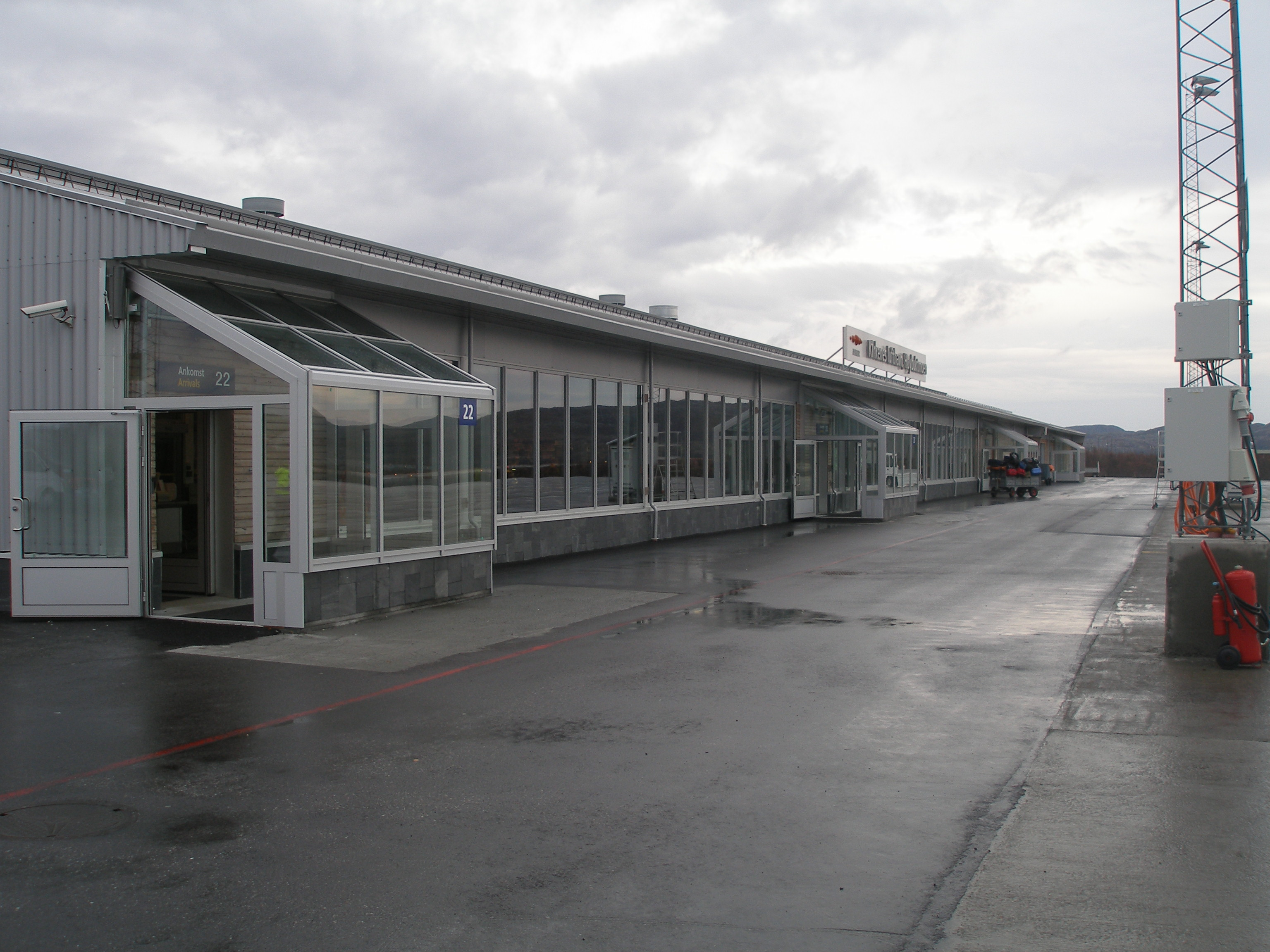
Kirkenes Airport Høybuktmoen, terminal air side

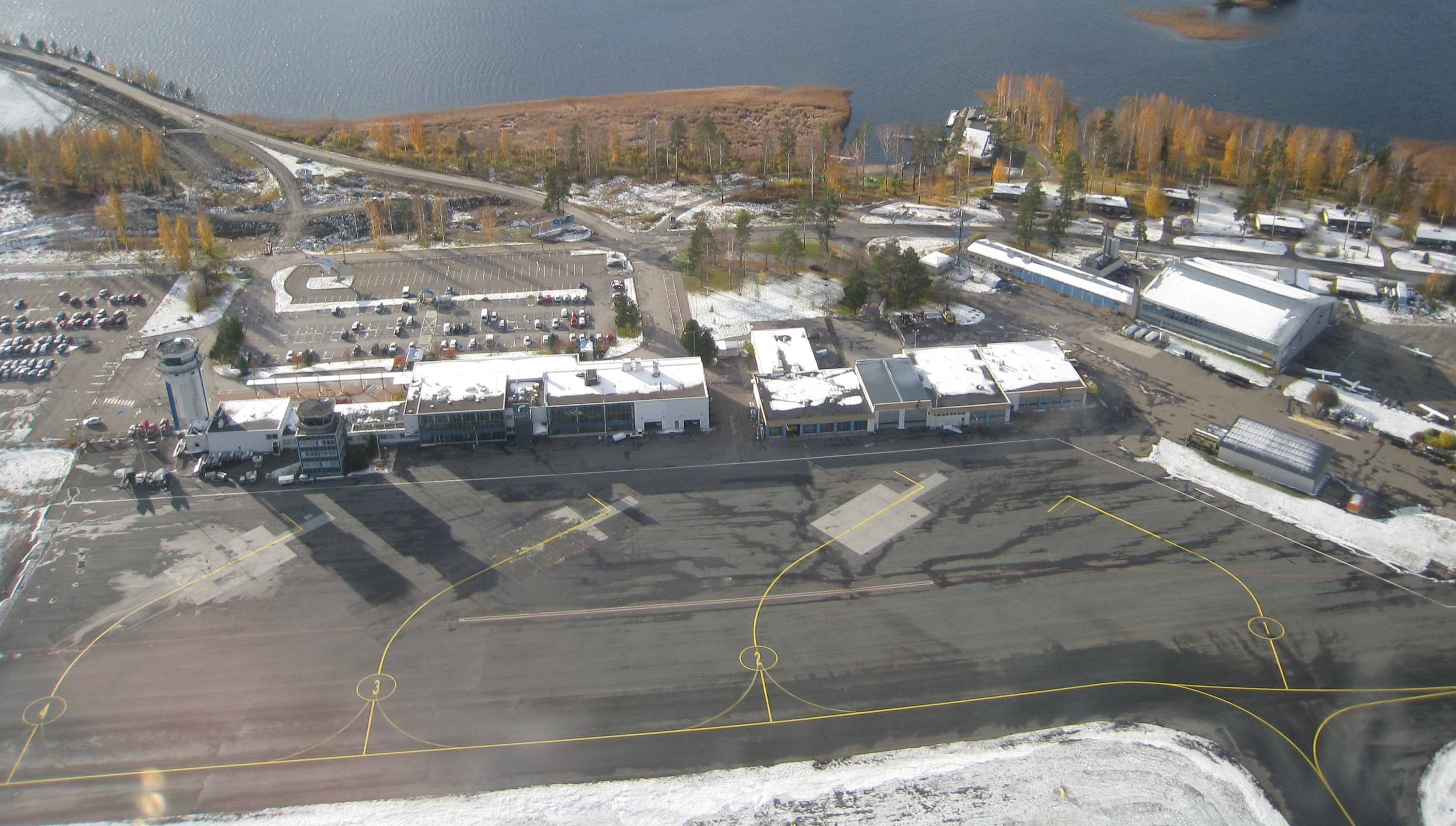
Kuopio Airport, apron and terminal

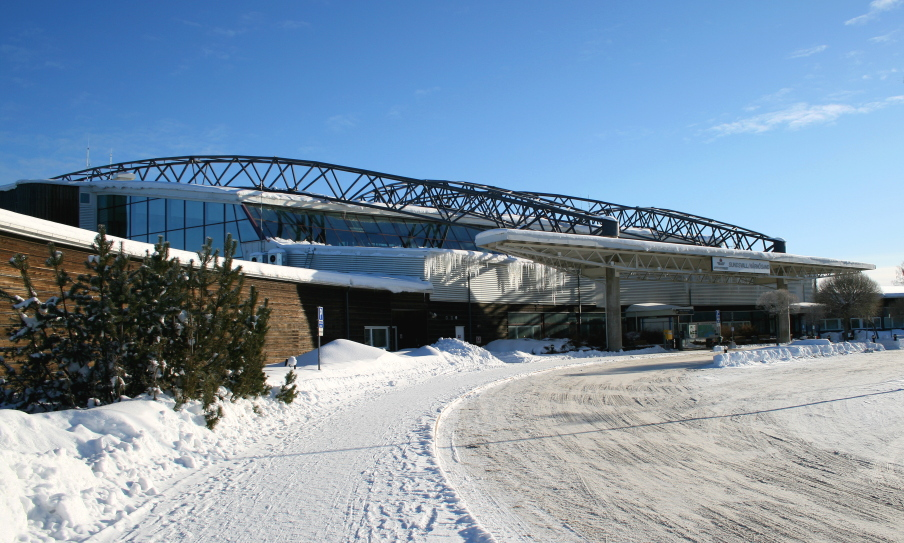
Sundsvall-Härnösand Airport, terminal land side

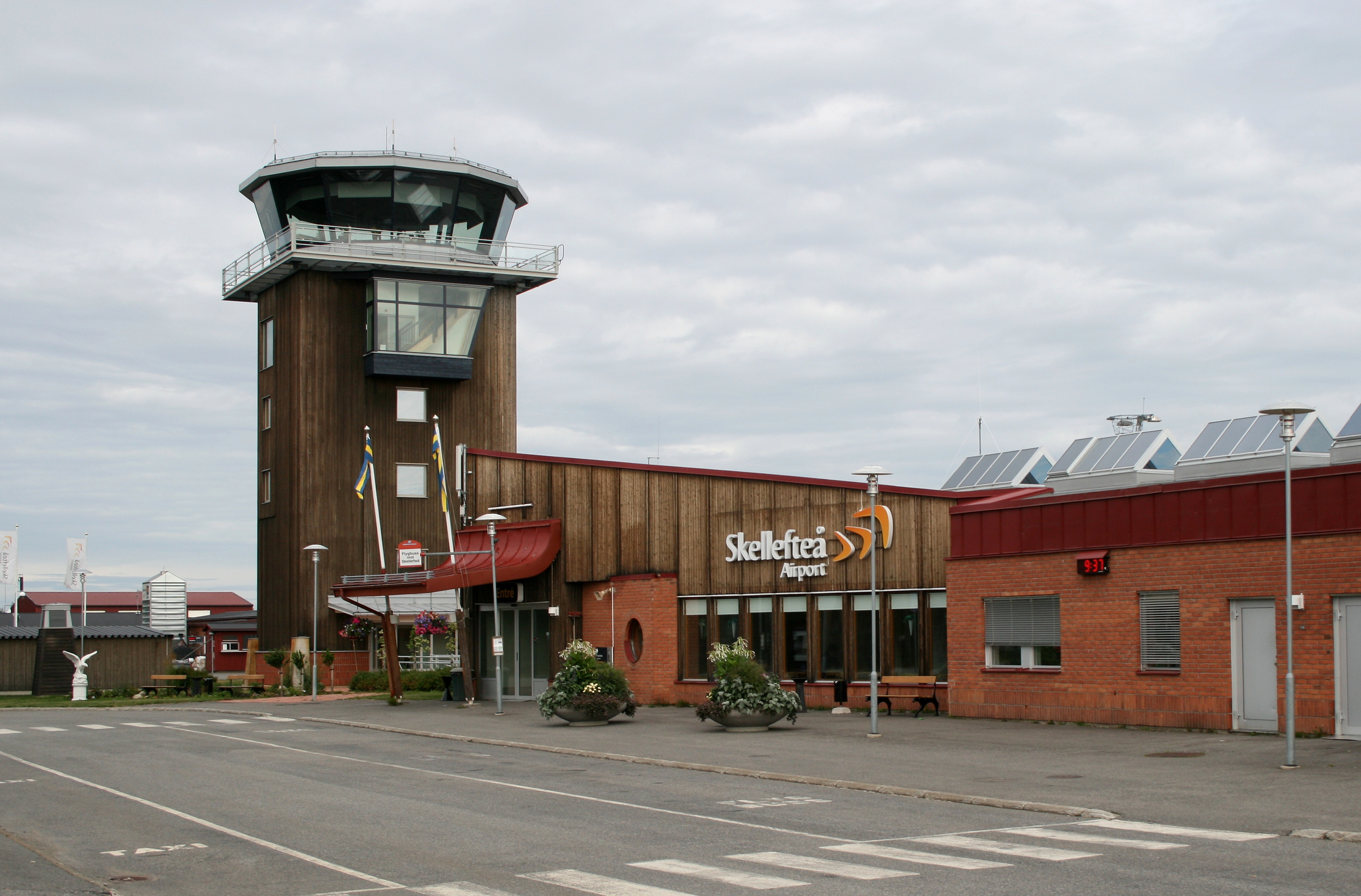
Skellefteå Airport, terminal and ATC-tower land side

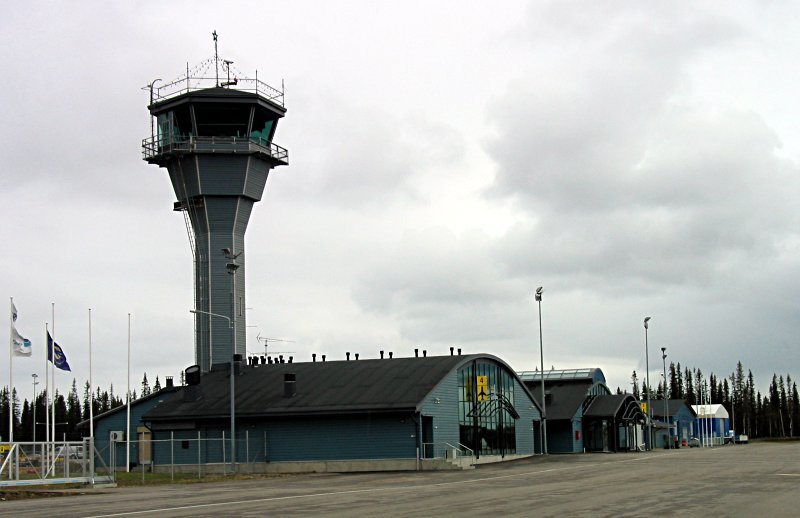
Kittilä Airport, terminal and ATC-tower air side

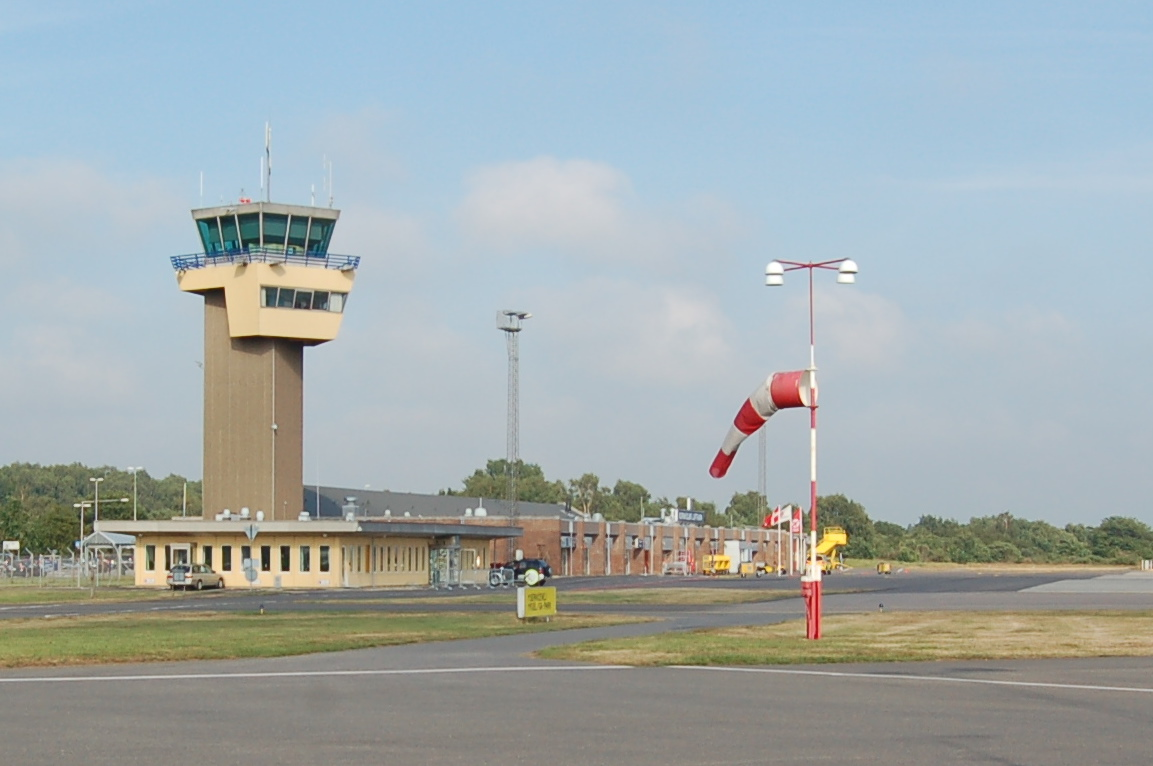
Bornholm Airport, terminal and ATC-tower air side

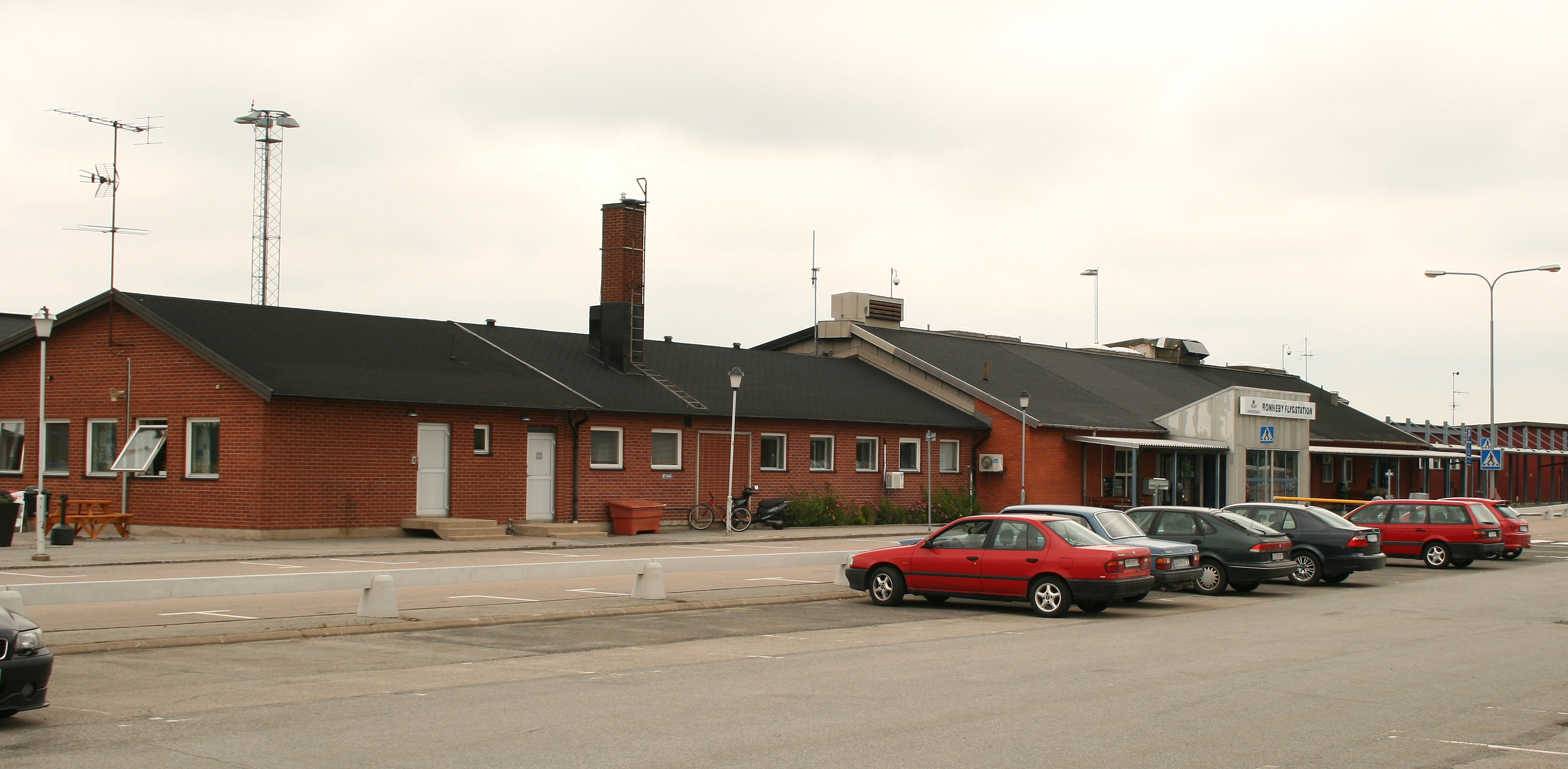
Ronneby Airport, terminal land side

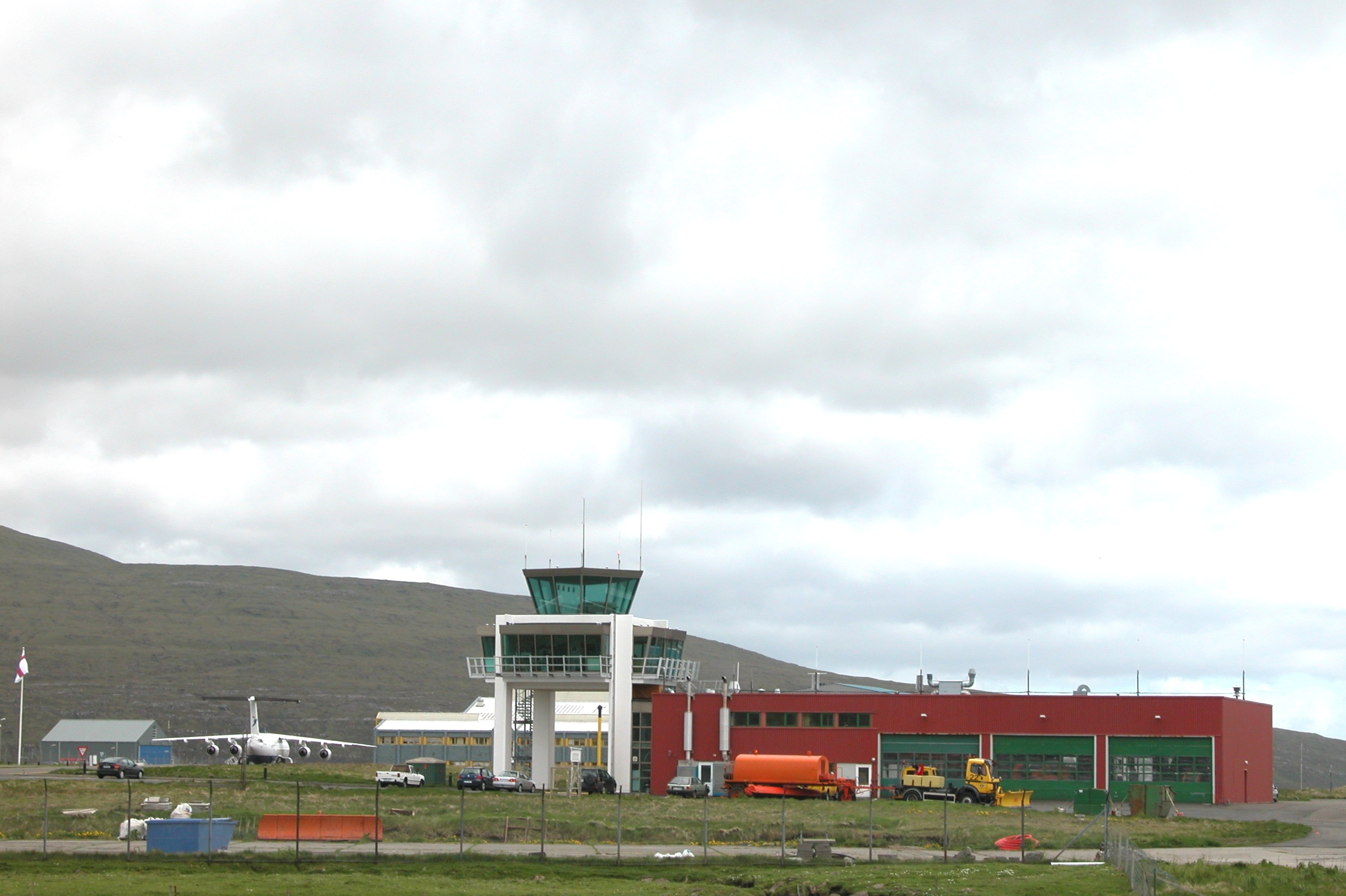
Vágar Airport, service buildings adjacent to apron

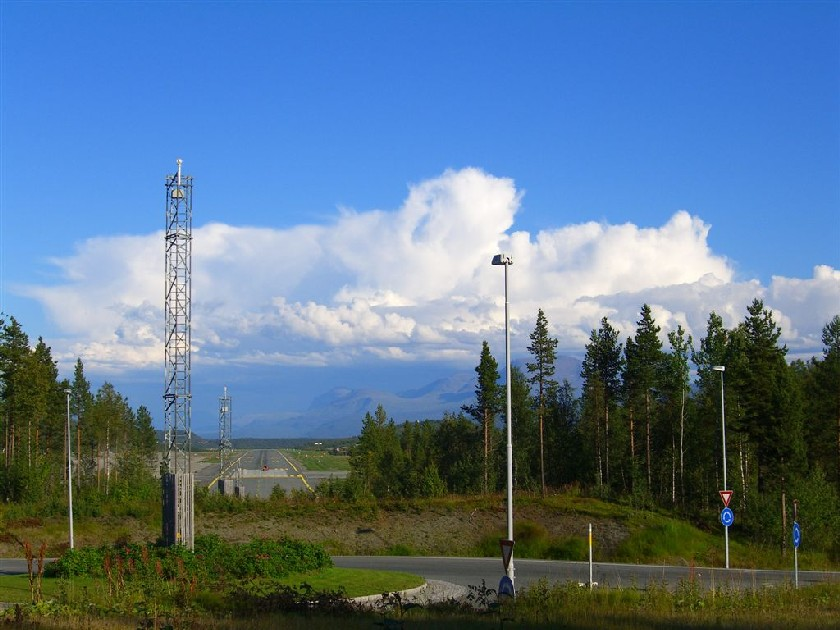
Bardufoss Airport, runway and approach lights

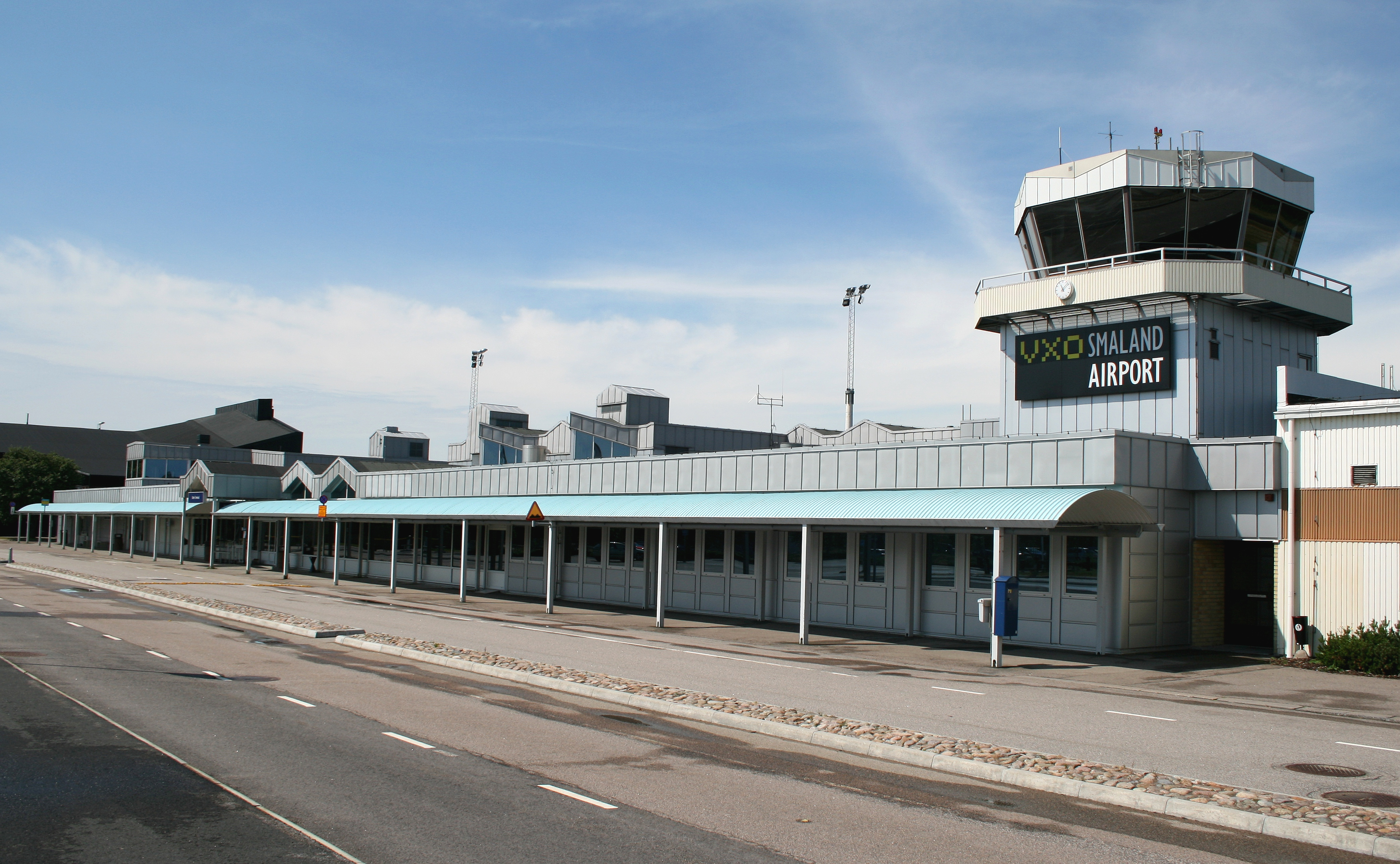
Växjö Småland Airport, terminal land side

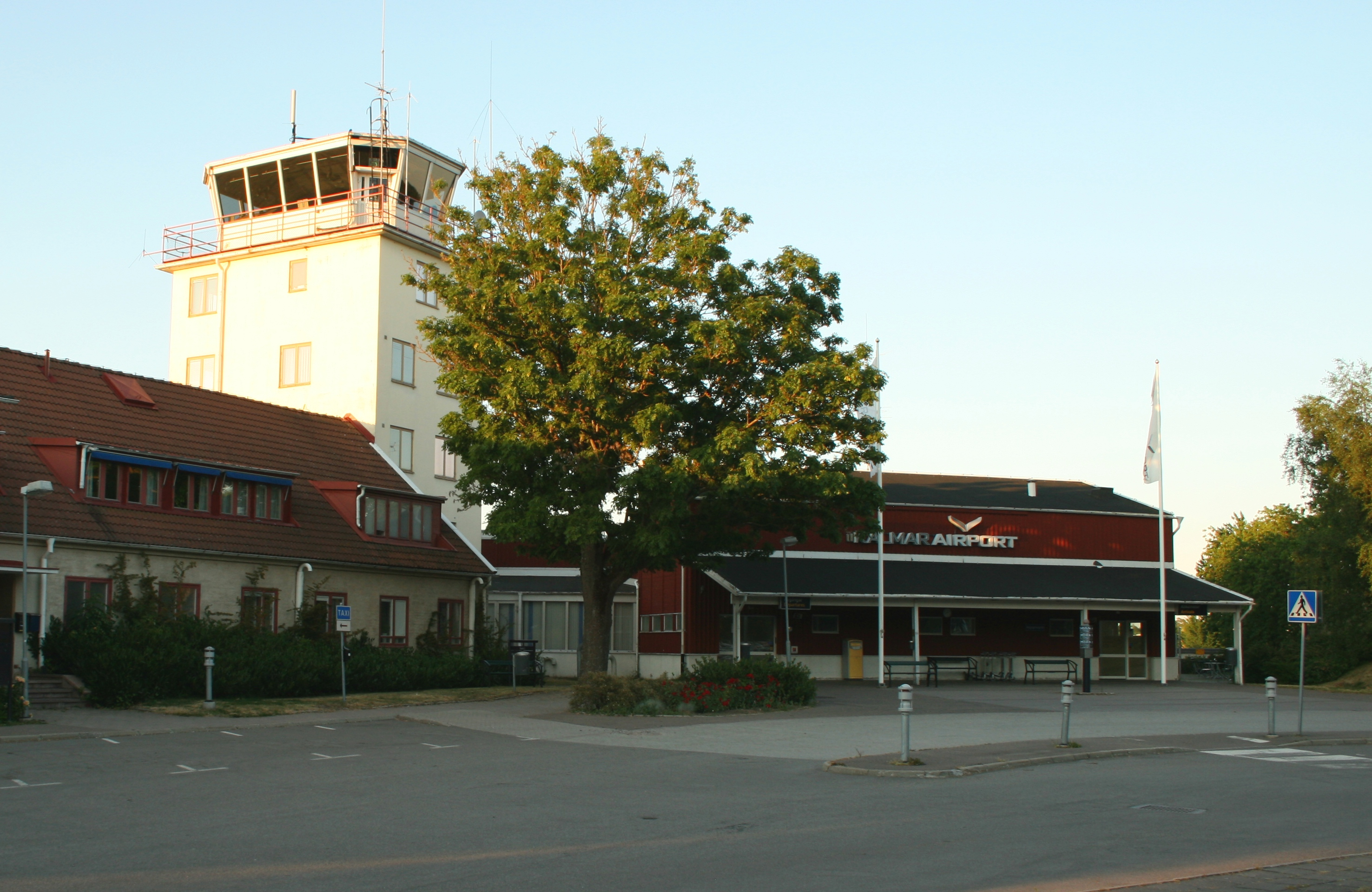
Kalmar Airport, terminal land side

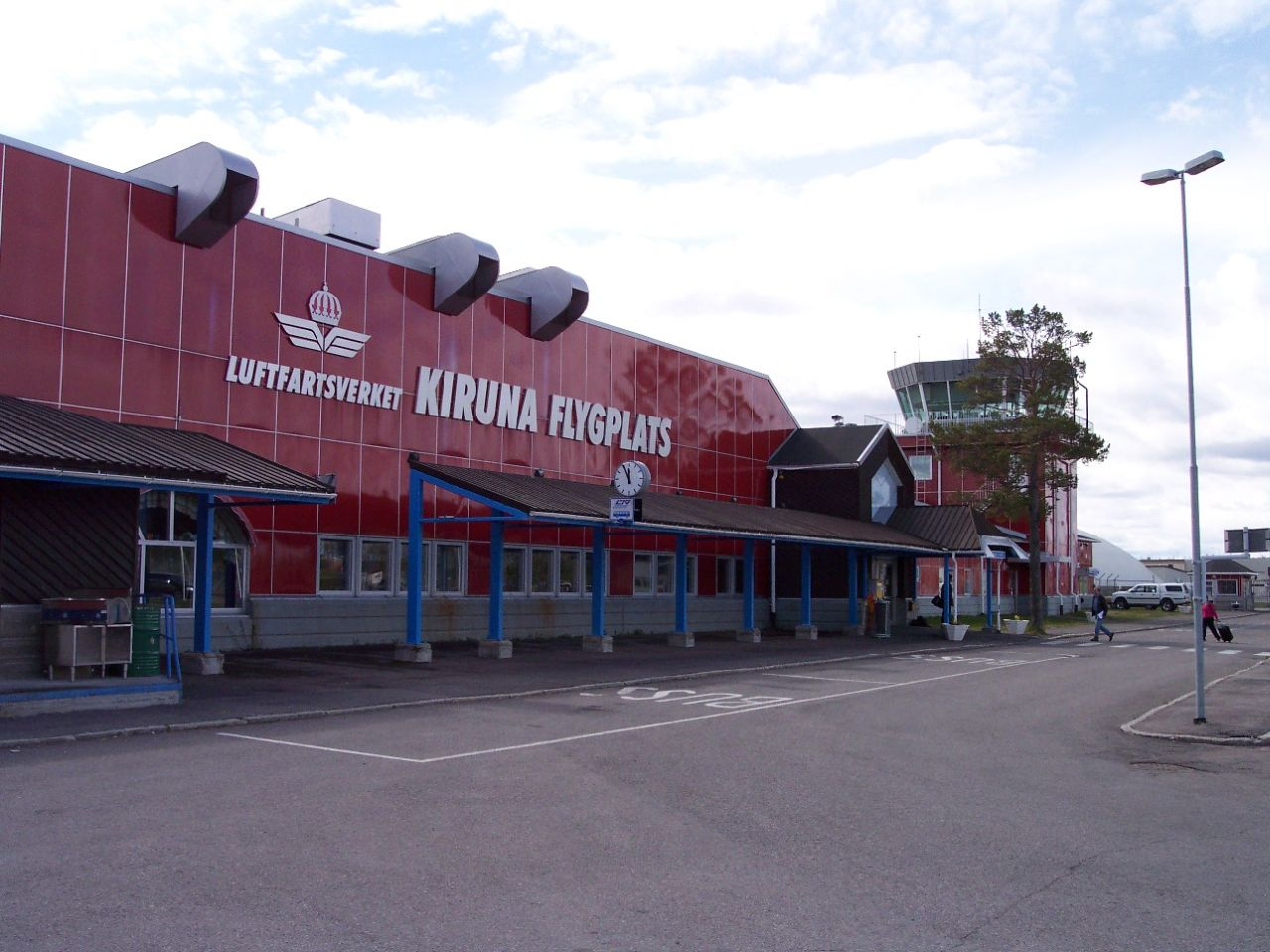
Kiruna Airport, terminal land side

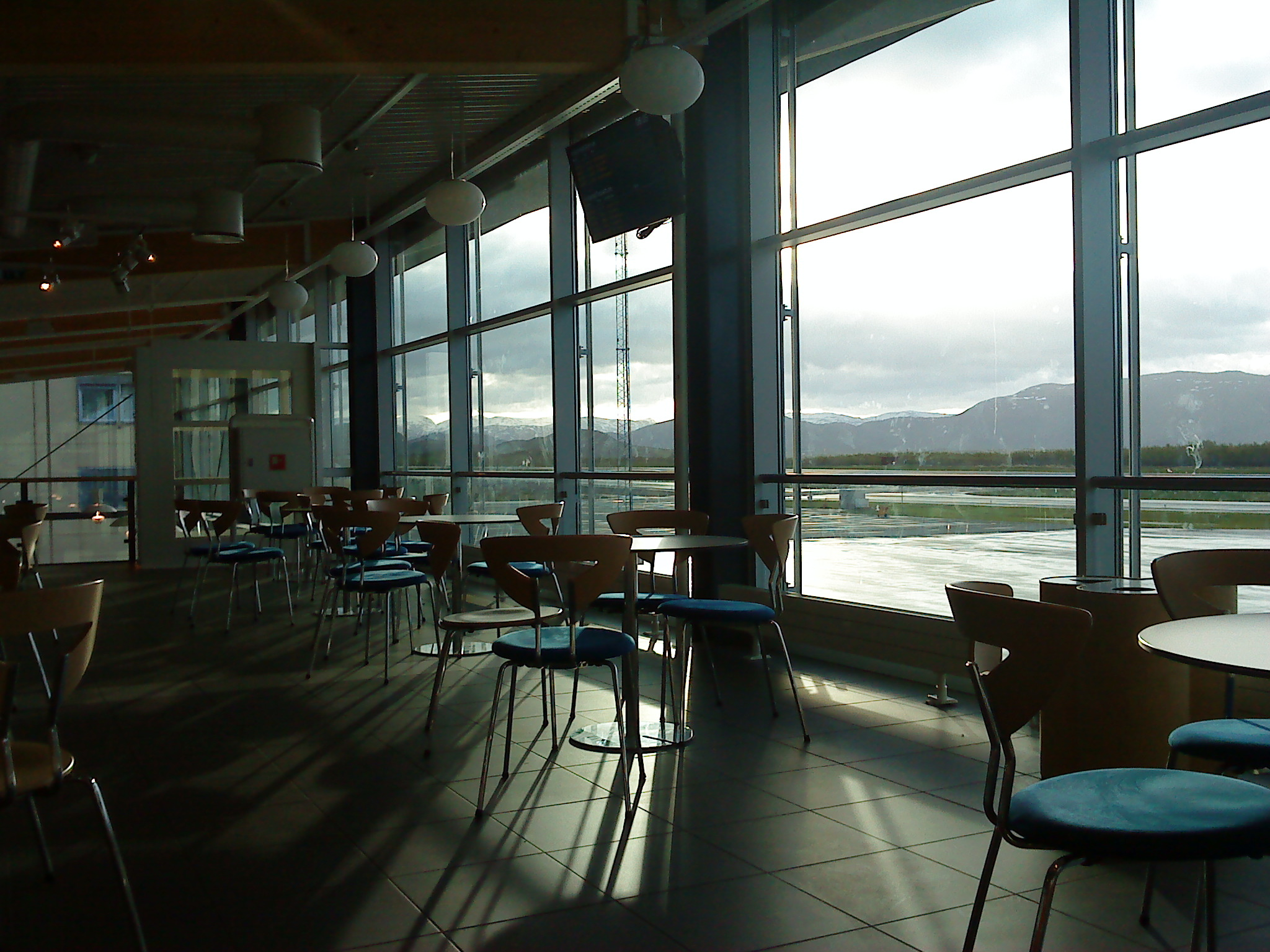
Brønnøysund Airport Brønnøy, inside terminal

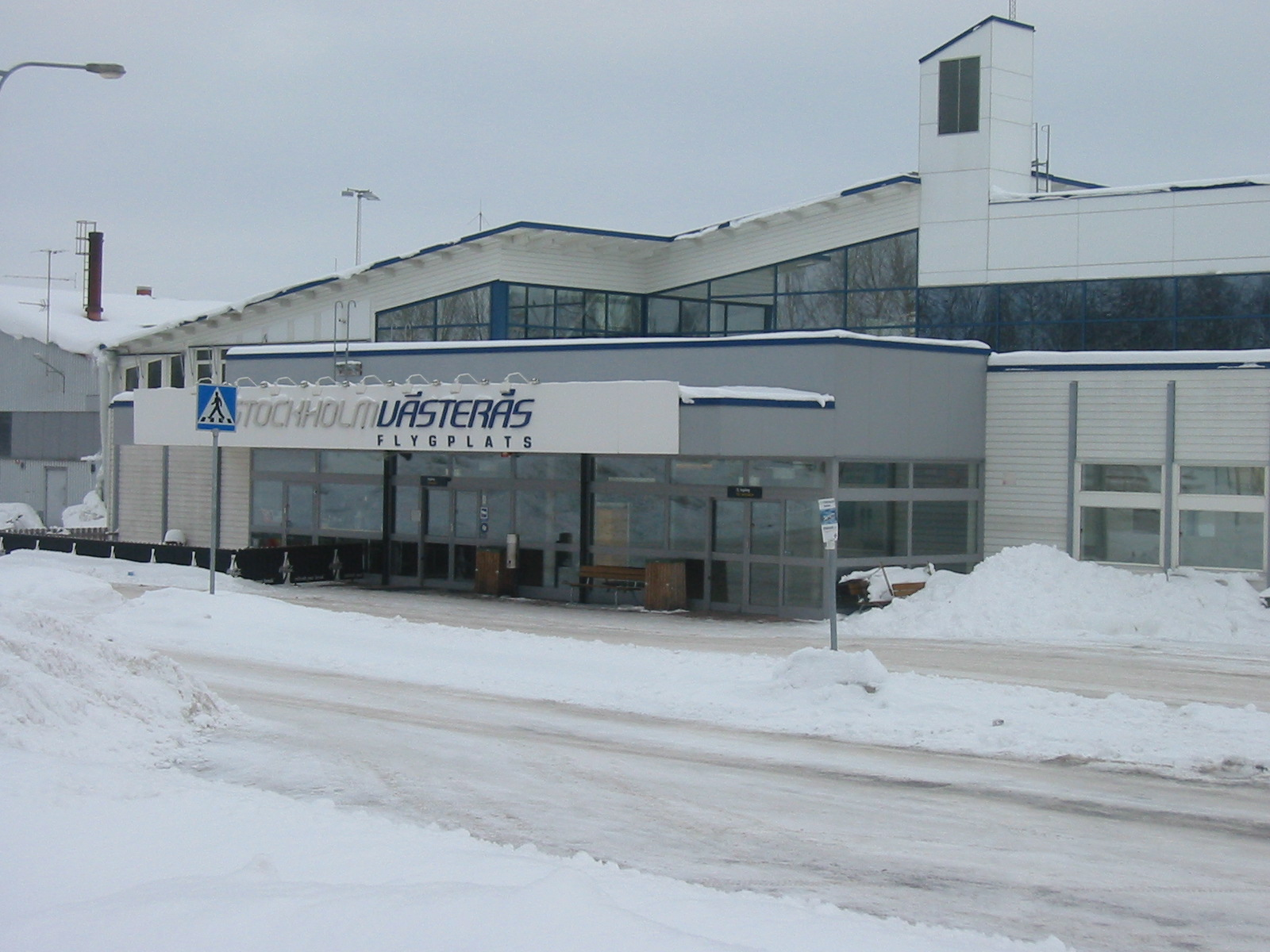
Stockholm Västerås Airport, terminal land side

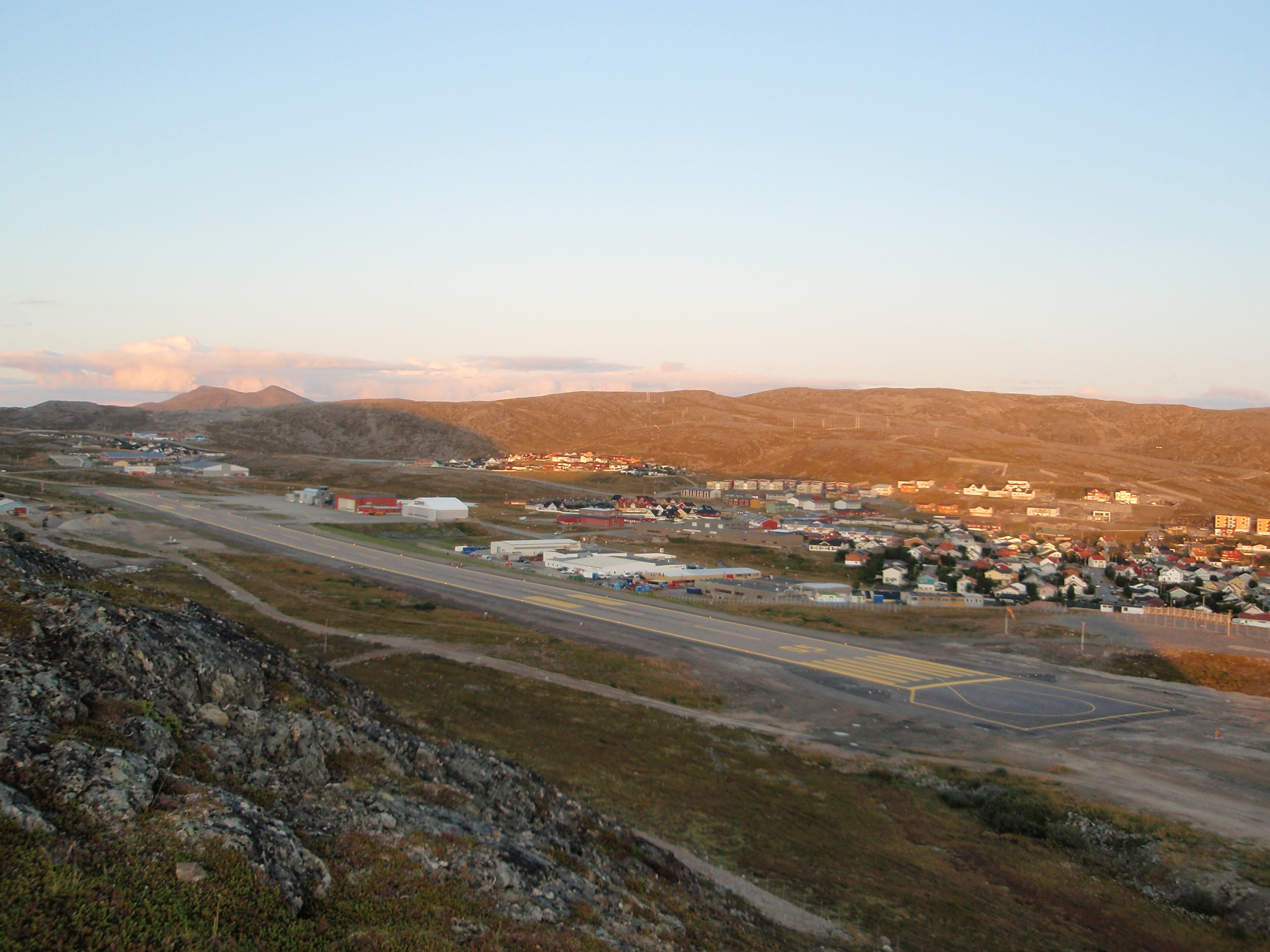
Hammerfest Airport, airport overview

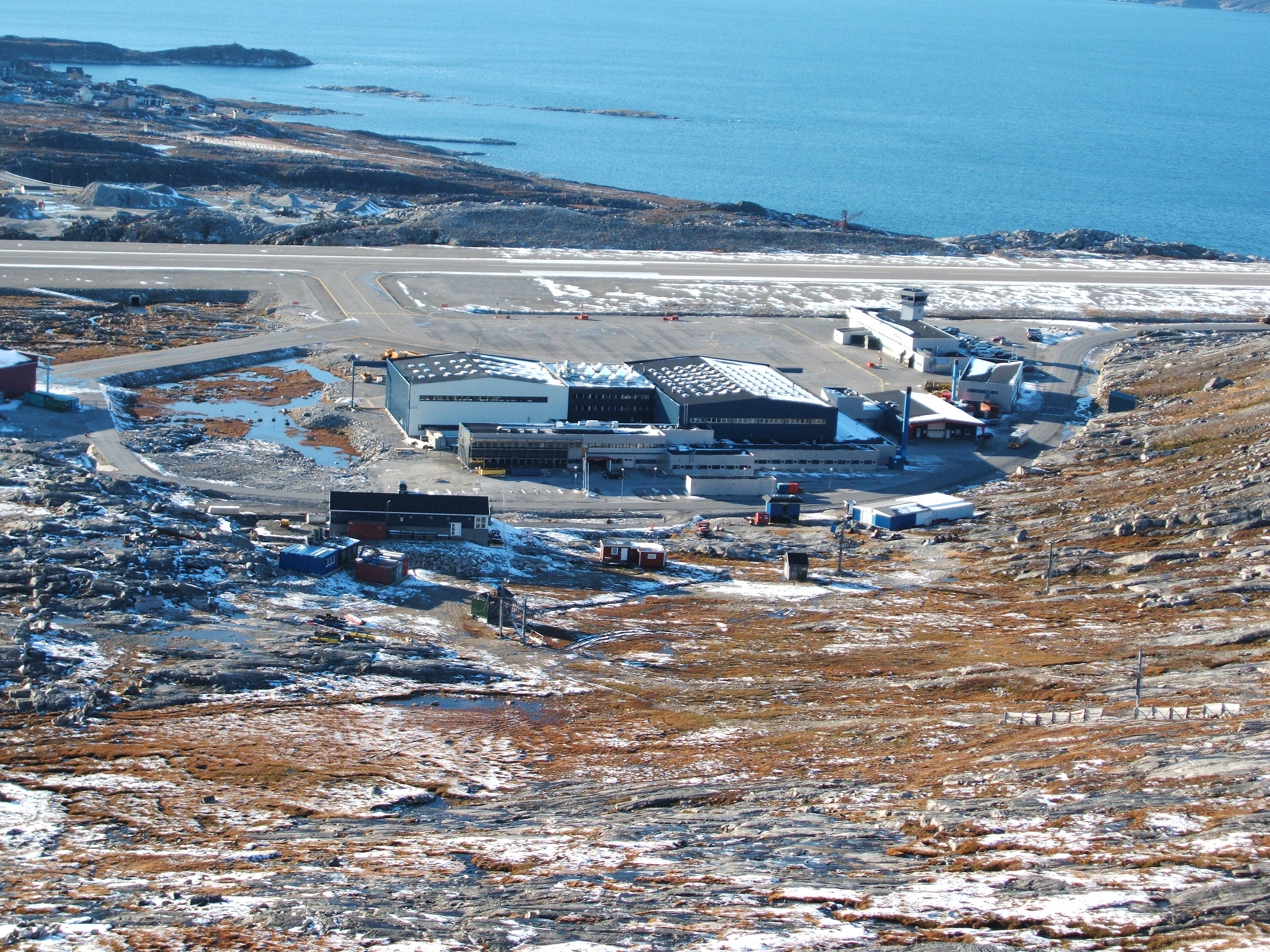
Nuuk Airport, terminal and runway

== See also ==
- List of the busiest airports in Europe
- List of busiest airports by passenger traffic
- List of busiest passenger air routes
