= Nextjet =

Swedish regional airline (2002–2018)

NextJet
IATA	ICAO	Call sign
2N	NTJ	NEXTJET
- Founded: 2002
- Ceased operations: 16 May 2018
- Hubs: Stockholm-Arlanda Airport
- Secondary hubs: Mariehamn Airport
- Fleet size: 15
- Destinations: 22
- Headquarters: Solna Municipality, Sweden
- Key people: Magnus Ivarsson (CEO)
- Website: nextjet.se on archive.org

NextJet was one of the largest regional airlines in Sweden. It was headquartered in Frösundavik in Solna Municipality, just north of Stockholm. The airline filed for bankruptcy on 16 May 2018.

== History ==
NextJet served most of their domestic destinations from Stockholm-Arlanda Airport. As of summer 2010 they also served a lot of domestic destinations from Stockholm-Bromma Airport on behalf of Sverigeflyg as well as Stockholm-Arlanda Airport and Helsinki-Vantaa Airport from Mariehamn Airport on the behalf of Air Åland. Many of the domestic routes operated by NextJet were subsidised by the Swedish government. Its IATA airline designator, 2N, is shared with the Ukrainian Південмашавіа / Yuzhmashair.

One of the airline's investors was former member of ABBA, Björn Ulvaeus. It also operated taxi and executive charter flights with two business jet aircraft. Since 2012, the main owner of Nextjet had been Örnsköldsvik's local business life through Höga Kusten Flyg AB, and the owner's aim was to secure the air connections to Stockholm. Since July 2016 Nextjet group (Nextjet Sverige AB, Nextjet AB and Sweports AB and Höga Kusten Flyg -brand) is mutually owned by Jakobstad-based energy company Katternö, Air Åland and Magnus Ivarsson - current Nextjet CEO and one of airline founders.

Six months prior to its demise, Nextjet experienced difficulty when one of its aircraft was sabotaged, resulting in closure of an airport and its air traffic.

On 16 May 2018, the airline filed for bankruptcy. It subsequently shut down operations and cancelled all flights that departed after 1pm that day. However on 1 June 2018, the airline was purchased by Olsen Group to resume operations on 11 June 2018, rebranding the airline as Air Scandic. However, the airline never resumed operations since.

== Destinations ==
NextJet served the following destinations (as of May 2017):

Country	City	Airport name
Åland	Mariehamn Secondary hub	Mariehamn Airport
Finland	Helsinki	Helsinki Airport
Finland	Kokkola / Jakobstad	Kokkola-Pietarsaari Airport
Finland	Oulu	Oulu Airport
Finland	Pori Secondary hub	Pori Airport
Finland	Turku	Turku Airport
Norway	Tromsø	Tromsø Airport
Sweden	Arvidsjaur	Arvidsjaur Airport
Sweden	Gällivare	Gällivare Airport
Sweden	Gothenburg	Göteborg Landvetter Airport
Sweden	Hemavan	Hemavan Airport
Sweden	Jönköping	Jönköping Airport
Sweden	Karlstad	Karlstad Airport
Sweden	Kramfors	Kramfors Airport
Sweden	Luleå	Luleå Airport
Sweden	Lycksele	Lycksele Airport
Sweden	Stockholm Hub	Stockholm-Arlanda Airport
Sweden	Sundsvall	Sundsvall-Timrå Airport
Sweden	Vilhelmina	Vilhelmina Airport
Sweden	Visby	Visby Airport
Sweden	Västerås	Stockholm Västerås Airport
Sweden	Örnsköldsvik	Örnsköldsvik Airport

== Fleet ==
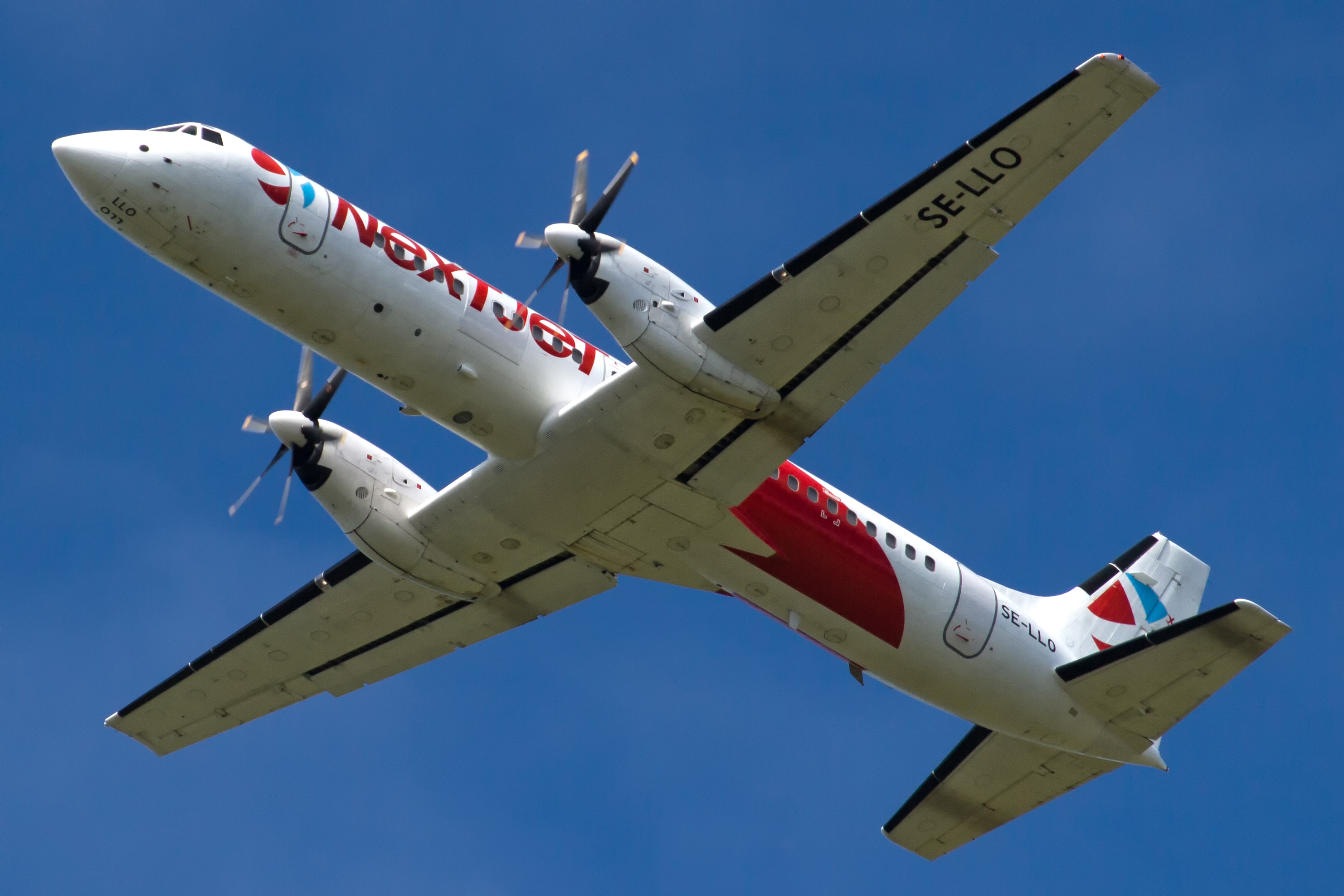
Nextjet BAe ATP

At the time of bankruptcy in May 2018, the NextJet fleet included the following aircraft:

NextJet fleet
Aircraft	In service	Orders	Passengers	Notes
ATR 42-300	1	—	46	operated by DOT LT
BAe ATP	4	—	68	
Bombardier CRJ200	2	—	50	operated by Voyageur Airways
Saab 340A	3	—	33-36	
Saab 340B	6	—	33-36	
Total	15	—		
