= PopulAir =

Swedish airline

populAir

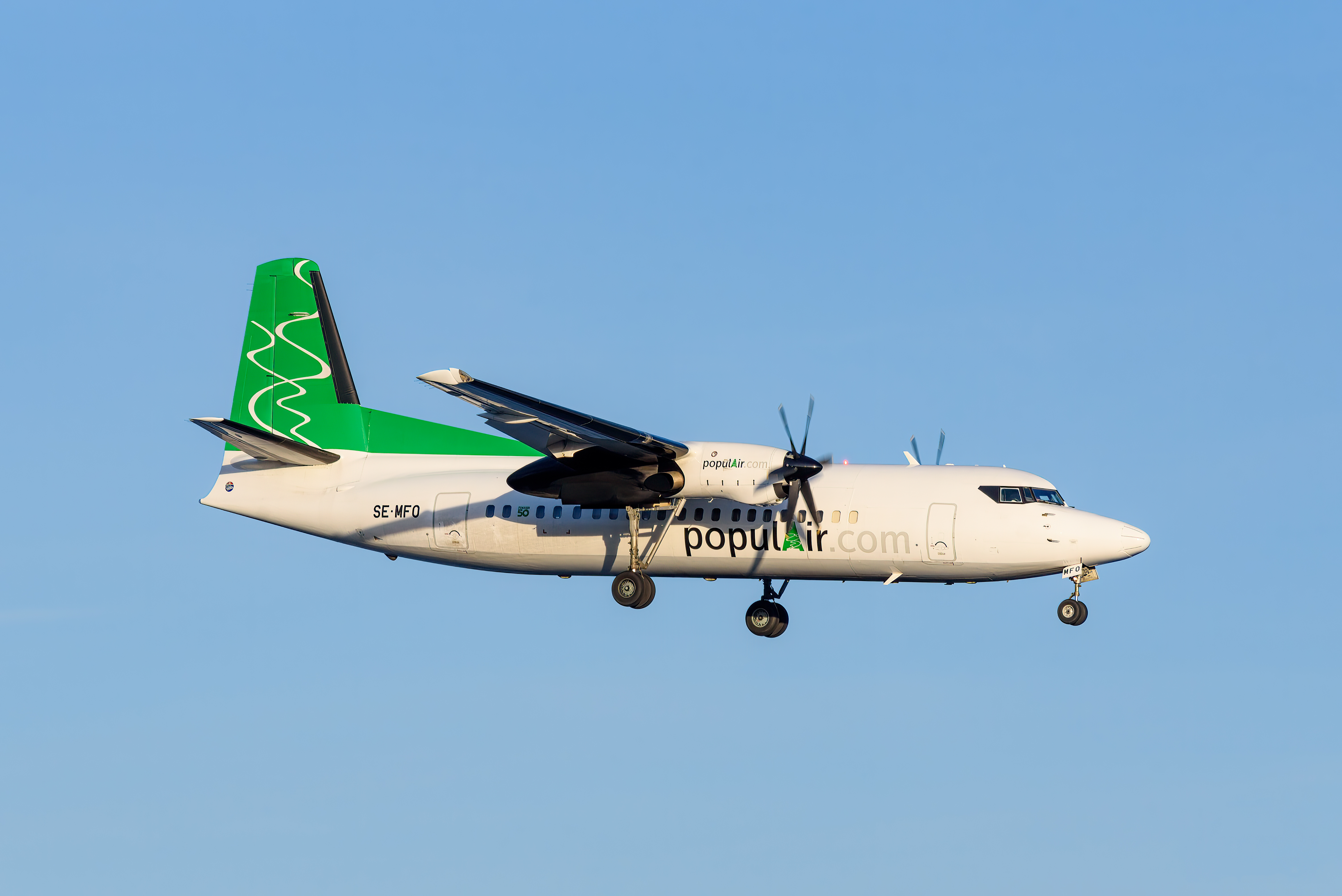
- A PopulAir Fokker 50
IATA	ICAO	Call sign
HP	APF	AMAPOLA
- Founded: 2004; 22 years ago
- AOC #: SE.AOC.0057
- Hubs: Stockholm Arlanda Airport
- Fleet size: 12
- Parent company: Sven Salén AB
- Headquarters: Stockholm Arlanda Airport, Sweden
- Website: www.populair.com

PopulAir (styled as populAir) is a passenger and cargo airline based in Stockholm, Sweden. Known between 2004 and 2023 as Amapola Flyg, the airline's primary hub is located at Stockholm Arlanda Airport. The airline offers flights to various destinations across Sweden, including public service obligation routes to northern Sweden. Additionally, populAir provides passenger services from Mariehamn to Turku. PopulAir operates a fleet consisting of 12 Fokker 50 aircraft, which includes 7 passenger planes and 5 cargo planes.

== History ==
Amapola Flyg AB was established and started operations in 2004 to take over postal services previously operated by Falcon Air. It is wholly owned by Salenia (a Swedish investment company) and has some 50 employees.

Amapola operated freight services on behalf of the Swedish postal service, Jetpak and MiniLiner from Maastricht Aachen Airport and its main base at Stockholm-Arlanda Airport.

On July 1, 2018, Amapola Flyg began passenger air traffic with regional routes in Sweden. In April 2021, the airline started flights in Finland from Helsinki-Vantaa Airport to Joensuu, on behalf of the Finnish State traffic authority Traficom. The airline operated the Dublin to Donegal PSO (Public Service Obligation) service from July 2021 to February 2022, following the collapse of Irish airline Stobart Air.

Amapola operated freight services on behalf of the Swedish postal service as their exclusive operator between 2004 and 2019.

Following the bankruptcy of Nextjet, On June 1, 2018, the Swedish Transport Administration (Trafikverket) announced Amapola Flyg's takeover of air services on several public service obligation routes to Norrland. In October 2023, Amapola was awarded another contract by the Swedish Transport Administration to operate domestic flights on twelve routes from 2023 to 2027. These routes, include Gällivare–Kramfors–Arlanda and Hemavan–Arvidsjaur–Vilhelmina–Lycksele–Arlanda.

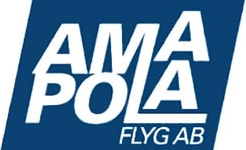
Name and branding used until 2023

Amapola changed its name to PopulAir as part of a rebranding effort in October 2023. This change was accompanied by a new green and white livery for its Fokker 50 aircraft. In October 2024, PopulAir relocated its operations at Arlanda Airport to Terminal 3

== Destinations ==
This is a list of destinations operated by PopulAir (passenger flights) as of November 2024:

Country	City	Airport	Notes	Refs
Sweden	Arvidsjaur	Arvidsjaur Airport		
Sweden	Gällivare	Gällivare Lapland Airport		
Sweden	Hemavan	Hemavan Airport		
Sweden	Jönköping	Jönköping Airport	Part of Jönköping-Oslo-Trondheim freight route	
Sweden	Kramfors	Höga Kusten Airport		
Sweden	Lycksele	Lycksele Airport		
Sweden	Örnsköldsvik	Örnsköldsvik Airport		
Sweden	Stockholm	Stockholm Arlanda Airport	Base	
Sweden	Vilhelmina	Vilhelmina Airport		
Finland	Mariehamn	Mariehamn Airport		
Finland	Turku	Turku Airport		
Norway	Oslo	Gardermoen Airport	From 2026 (freight)	
Norway	Trondheim	Trondheim Airport	From 2026 (freight)	

== Fleet ==
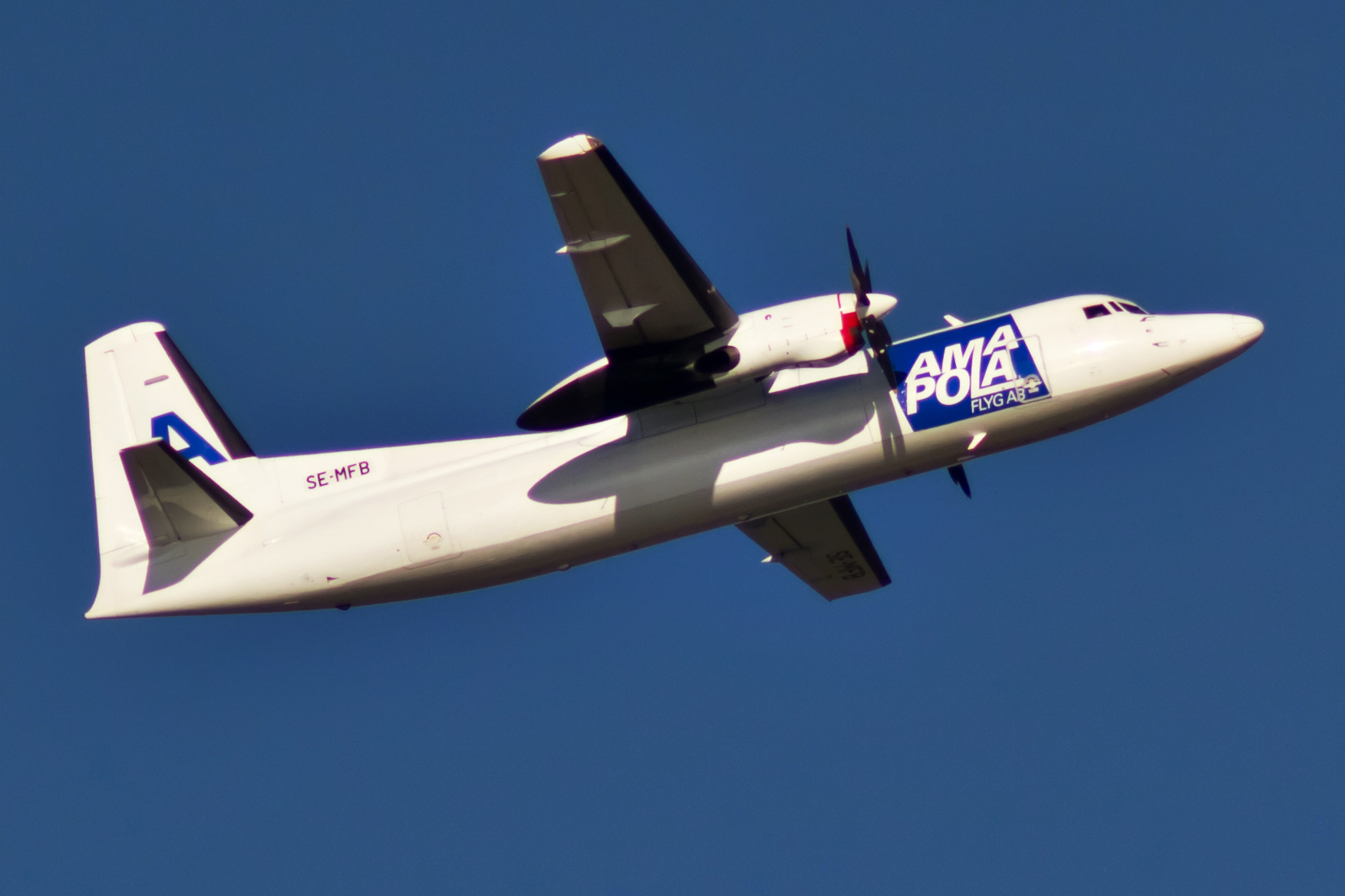
Amapola Freight Fokker 50

As of August 2025, Amapola Flyg operates the following aircraft:

Aircraft	In service	Orders	Passengers
Fokker 50	7	—	50
Fokker 50 Freighter	5	—	Cargo
Total	12	—	
