= Storuman Airport =

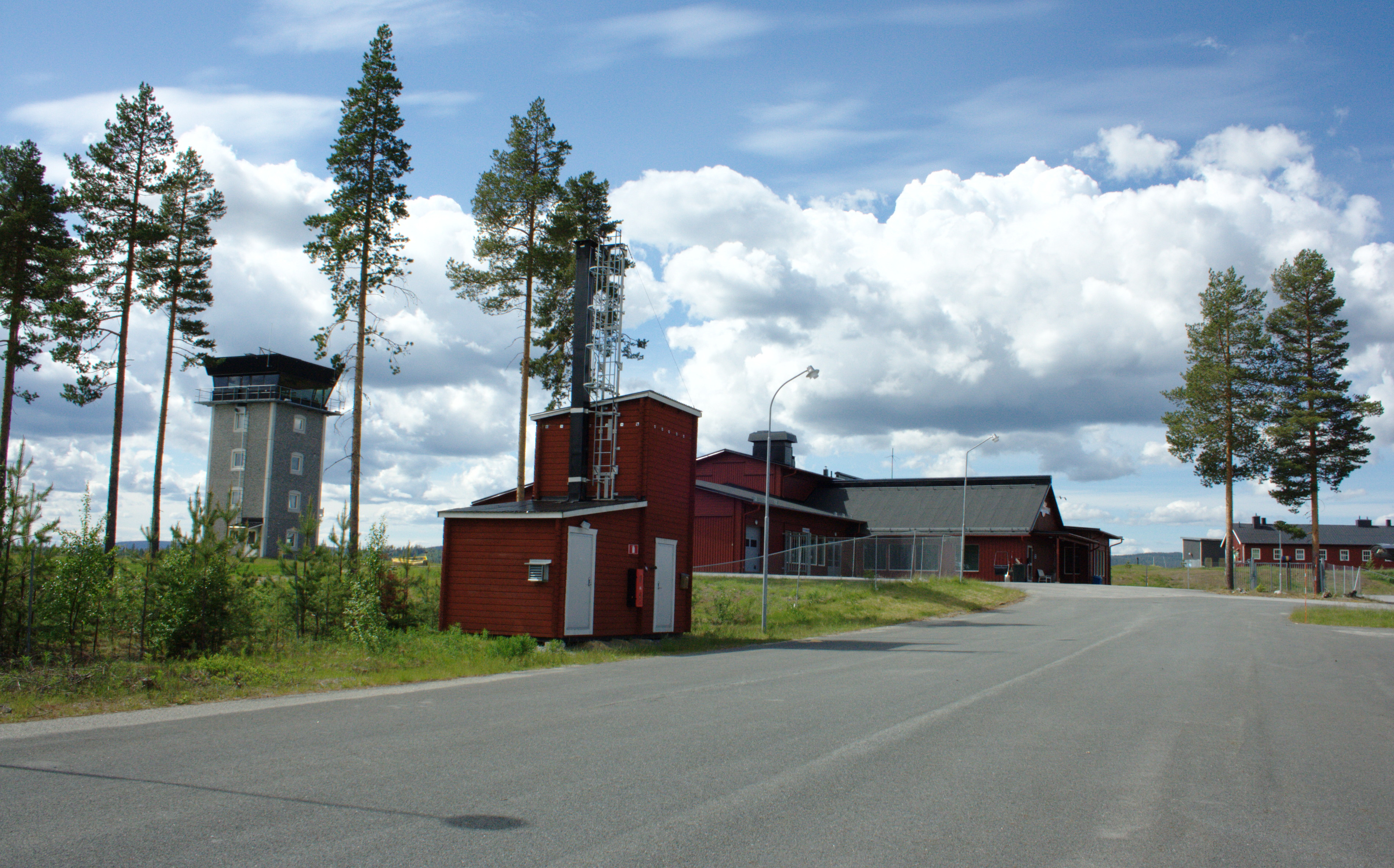
- IATA: SQO; ICAO: ESUD

Summary
- Airport type: Military
- Owner: Swedish Fortifications Agency
- Location: Storuman
- Elevation AMSL: 915 ft (279 m)
- Coordinates: 64°57′39″N 017°41′47″E
- Interactive map of Storuman Airport

Runways
Direction	Length		Surface
Direction	ft	m	Surface
15/33	7,490	2,283	Asphalt

Statistics
- Passengers (2009): 9 346

Storuman Airport (IATA: SQO, ICAO: ESUD) is an airport about 35 km east of Storuman, Sweden, in the small village of Gunnarn. It had 12,753 passengers in 2006, but closed in June 2010. Since 2023 it has been owned by the Swedish Armed Forces.

== History ==
=== Foundation and early years ===
It was built as a military airbase (called Gunnarn), hence the relatively long runway. Scheduled passenger traffic to Stockholm began in 1993.

The government and the relevant authority decided not to support the traffic financially from autumn 2008. The reason is that the Vilhelmina Airport is located only 75 km (47 mi) from Storuman centre. Air traffic cannot continue without public financial support. The municipality thought it was important to have its own airport so it financed an operator itself from 2009. On 18 January 2010, Storuman Municipality decided to stop supporting the air traffic and to end the agreement with Avion Express. Traffic continued with only one flight per day until June 2010 when all scheduled traffic ended. Since 2018, flights from Vilhelmina make a landing at Lycksele Airport, making a drive (110 km/68 mi) to Lycksele the fastest way of travelling from Storuman to Stockholm.

=== Repurchase by Swedish Armed Forces ===
In May 2023, the Storuman Municipality made a decision to sell the airport to Fortifikationsverket, the agency responsible for managing defence properties in Sweden. Following this on September 3, 2023, the Swedish Armed Forces announced the repurchase of the airport for 18 million SEK. This sale was expected to save the municipality approximately 1.5 million SEK annually in operational costs. The Swedish Air Force's F21 Norbotten Wing, which has its main base in Luleå and side bases in Jokkmokk and Vidsel, plans to use Gunnarn as an additional side base.

== Statistics ==
This is the statistics of annual passengers at Storuman Airport until regular passenger traffic shut down in 2010:

Annual passenger traffic
Year	Passengers	Annual change
1998	11,503	▲11.85%
1999	13,216	▲14.89%
2000	17,475	▲32.23%
2001	20,691	▲18.40%
2002	15,868	▼23.31%
2003	13,475	▼15.08%
2004	14,325	▲6.31%
2005	13,821	▼3.52%
2006	12,753	▼7.73%
2007	12,501	▼1.98%
2008	10,577	▼15.39%
2009	9,346	▼11.64%
2010	2,795	▼70.09%

== See also ==
- List of the largest airports in the Nordic countries
