= Air Åland =

Provincial airline of Åland, Finland (2005–2012)

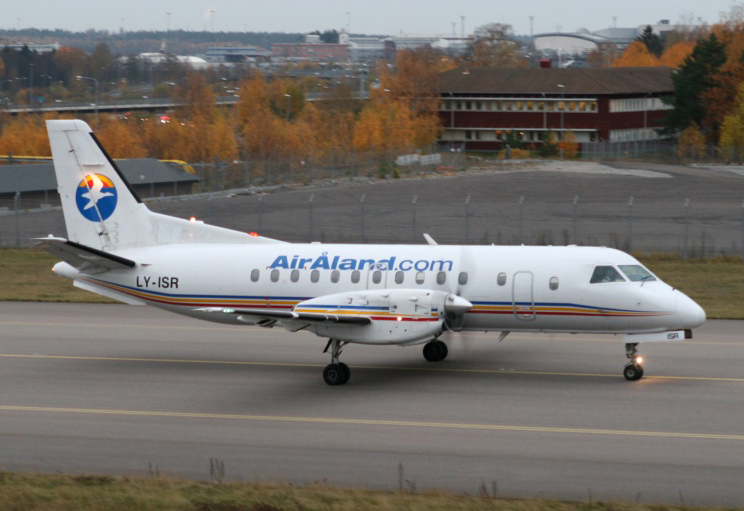
- Saab 340
| IATA | ICAO | Call sign |
|---|---|---|
| N9 2Q | NVD | NORVIND |
- Founded: 2005; 21 years ago
- Ceased operations: 2012; 14 years ago
- Hubs: Mariehamn Airport
- Fleet size: 2
- Destinations: 3
- Headquarters: Mariehamn, Åland, Finland

Air Åland AB was the provincial airline of Åland, with headquarters and operational base at Mariehamn Airport in Mariehamn, Åland, Finland. It operated scheduled services from Åland to Helsinki and Stockholm. Starting from 1 July 2012, its operations were handed over to the Swedish airline NextJet.

== History ==
The airline was founded on 14 January 2005 as Flyg & Far Åland and started operation on 29 October of that same year, with a broad base of owners within the trade and business of the Åland islands. The airline never had an own AOC (Air Operator Certificate) and through the years the flight operations were entrusted to different air operators. The goal of the owners was to maintain air traffic with good quality at a low price to mainland (Finland and Sweden). Starting from 1 July 2012, the operations were taken over by the Swedish airline NextJet.

== Destinations (before 2012) ==
In January 2011, Air Åland served the following destinations:

- Finland
  - Helsinki (Helsinki-Vantaa Airport)
- Sweden
  - Stockholm (Stockholm-Arlanda Airport)
- Åland
  - Mariehamn (Mariehamn Airport) hub

== Fleet (before 2012) ==
In 2010, the Air Åland fleet consisted of 2 Saab 340A operated by Nextjet.
