= Hälsingfors =

Village in Västerbotten County, Sweden

Coordinates: 64°32′59.96″N 18°41′59.14″E

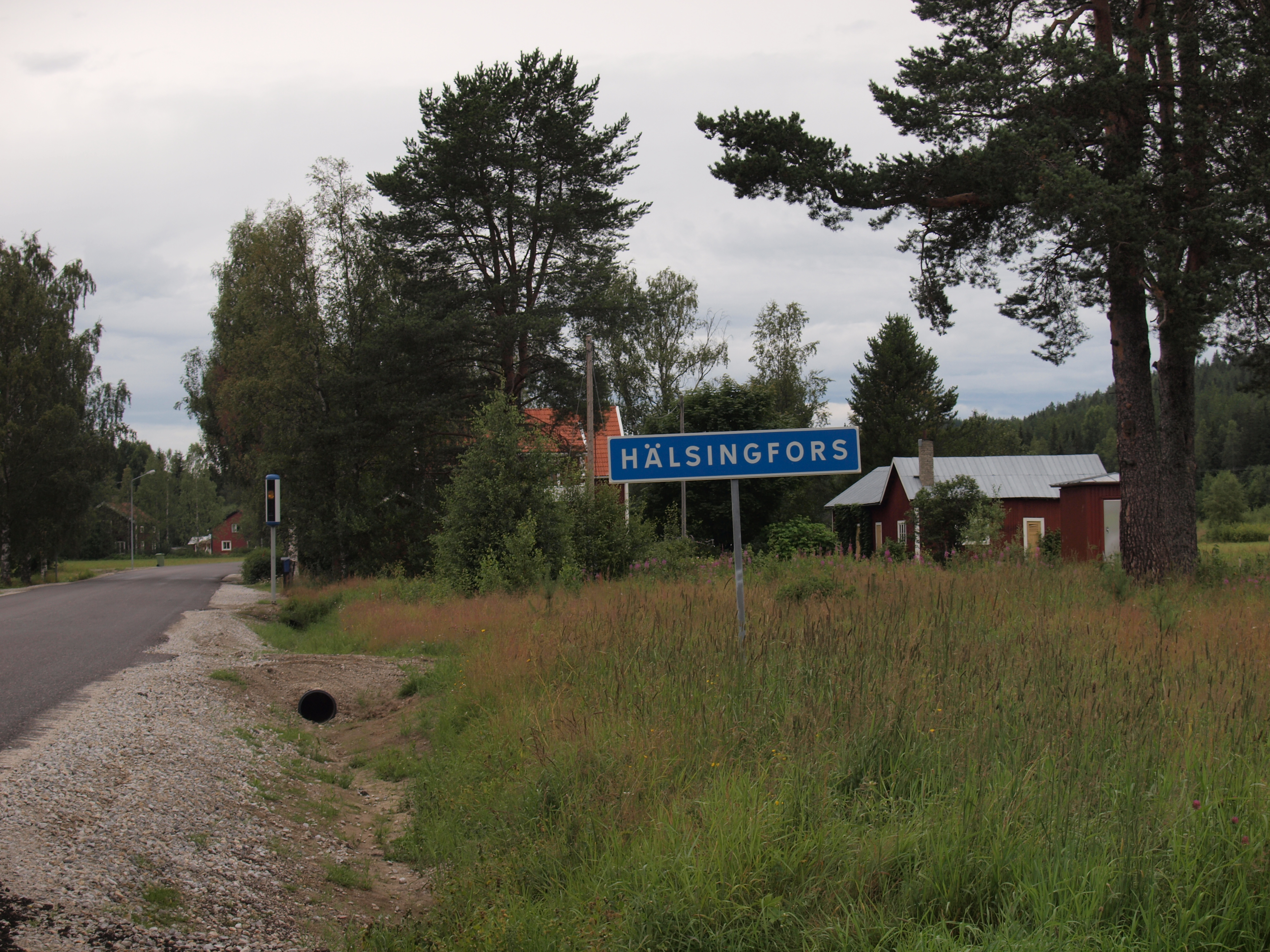
Entering Hälsingfors.

Hälsingfors is a village in Lycksele Municipality, Västerbotten County, Sweden, very near to Lycksele Airport.
