= Gardsjönäs =

Coordinates: 65°27′N 16°26′E

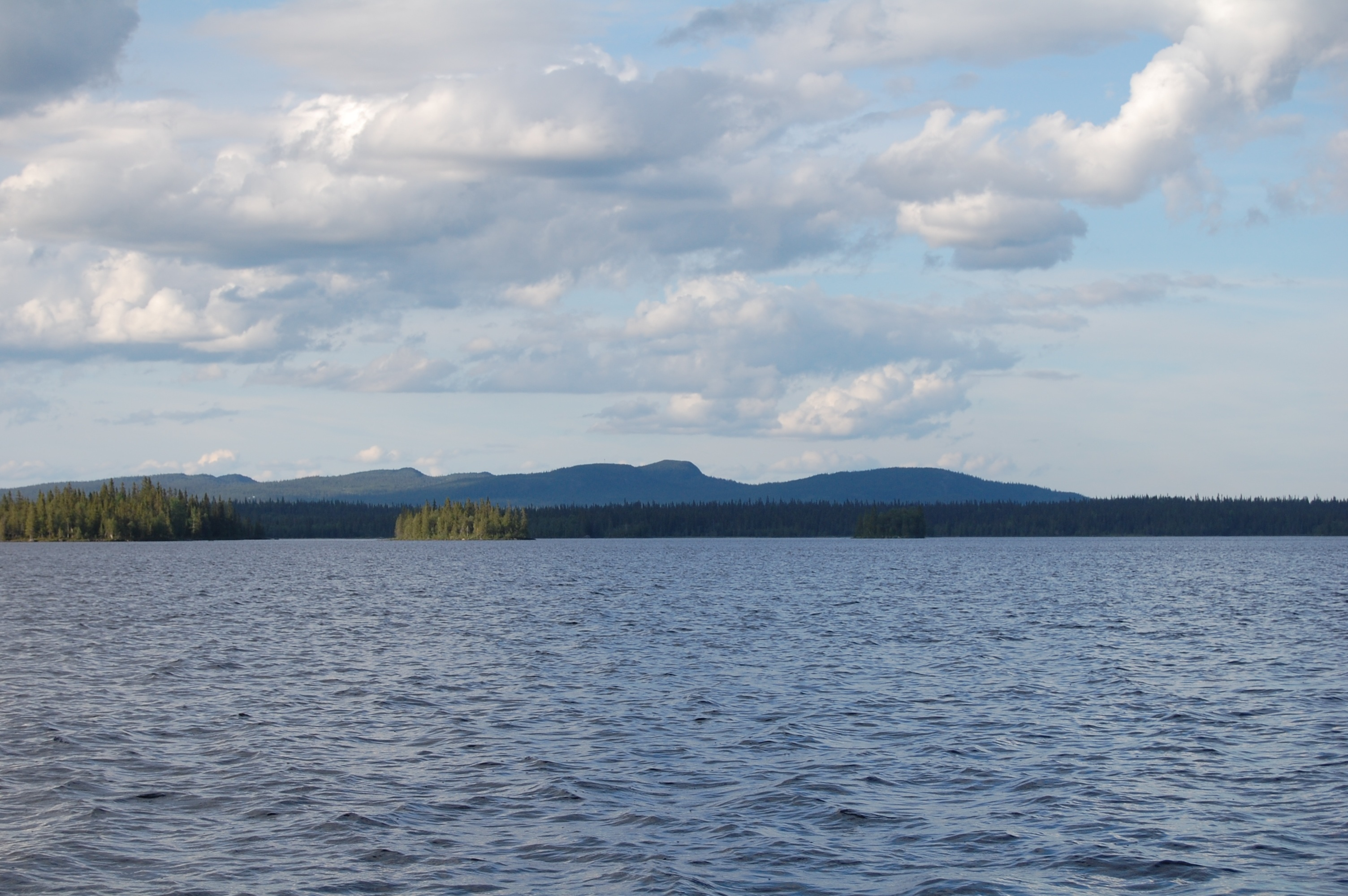
Lake Gardsjönäs in Gardsjönäs

Gardsjönäs is a small 200-year-old village with a population of 9. The village is located within the Storuman Municipality, Västerbotten County, Sweden.

The sami name is Gardejaur, meaning Fence-lake-Headland (Gard-sjö-näs in Swedish).

The village is located on high ground near a large lake, the Gardsjönäs lake, making it a quite popular place during the Swedish winter holidays, tourist and hunting seasons. The locals enjoy a wildlife untouched by man without being too far away from more urban settlements. The village is easily reached thanks to the close proximity of European route E12.
