= Aero Flight 217 =

1963 aviation accident

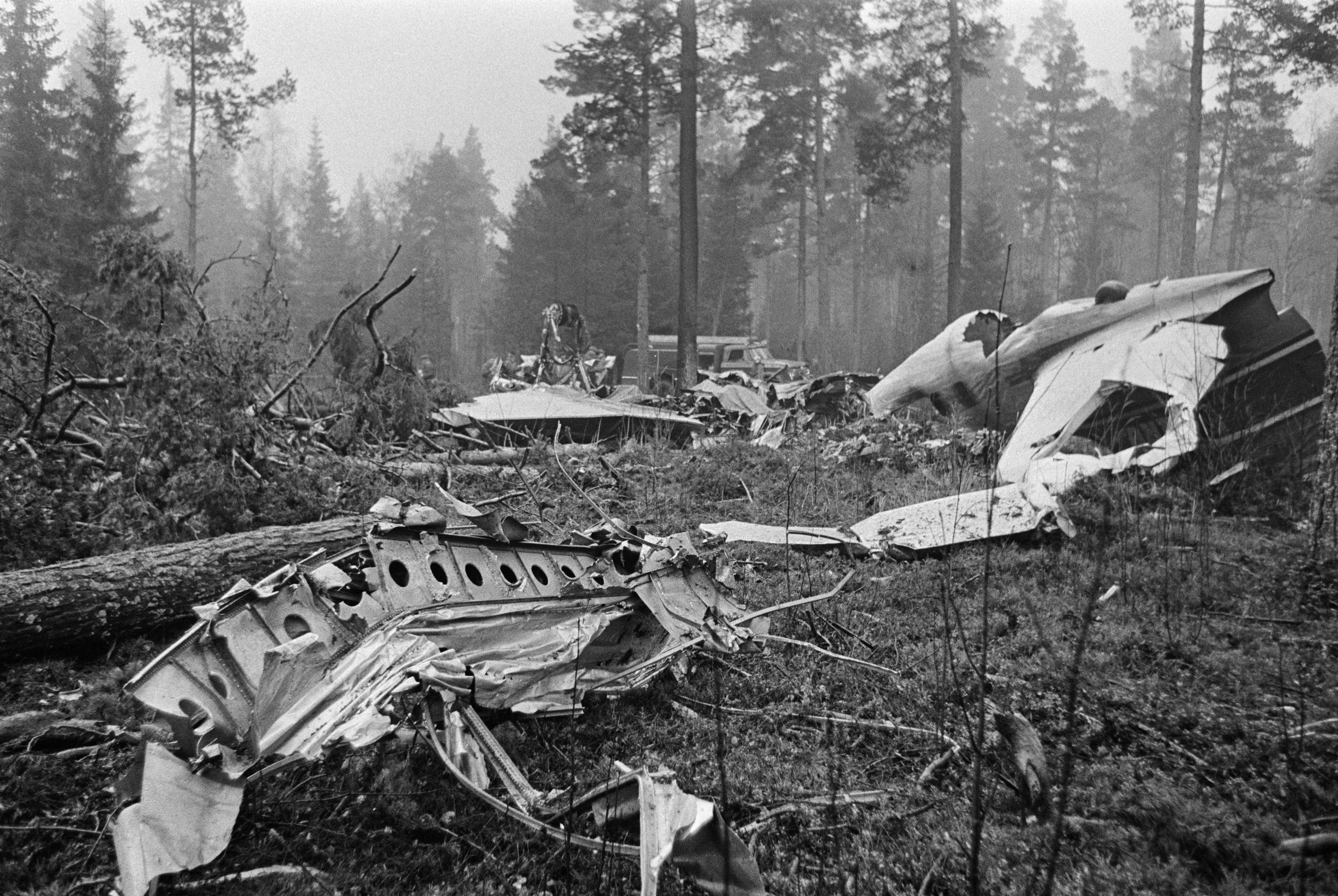
- Remains of OH-LCA in the woods near the airport, 1963

Accident
- Date: 8 November 1963
- Summary: Controlled flight into terrain
- Site: Near Mariehamn Airport, Jomala, Åland, Finland; 60°07′19″N 19°53′47″E

Aircraft
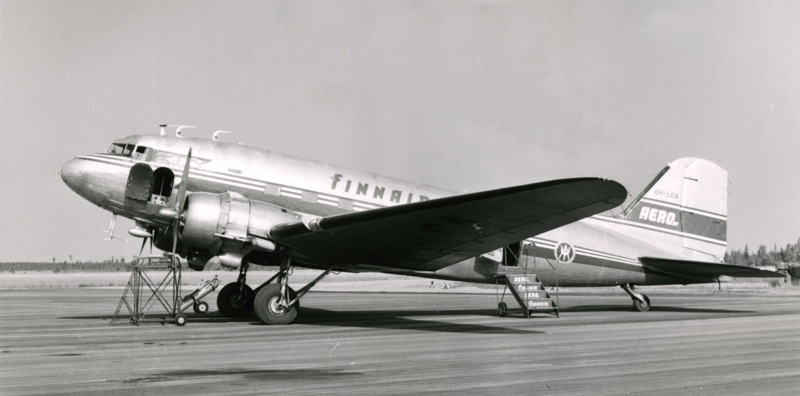
- OH-LCA, the aircraft involved in the accident
- Aircraft type: Douglas DC-3
- Operator: Aero O/Y
- IATA flight No.: AY217
- ICAO flight No.: FIN217
- Call sign: FINNAIR 217
- Registration: OH-LCA
- Flight origin: Helsinki Airport
- Stopover: Turku Airport
- Destination: Mariehamn Airport
- Occupants: 25
- Passengers: 22
- Crew: 3
- Fatalities: 22
- Survivors: 3

Aero Flight 217 was a domestic passenger flight from Helsinki, Finland, to Mariehamn in the autonomous territory of Åland, operated by the Finnish flag carrier Aero O/Y (now Finnair). On 8 November 1963, the aircraft serving the flight crashed in poor visibility while attempting to land on a non-precision approach at Mariehamn Airport in the municipality of Jomala, resulting in the deaths of 22 people out of 25 on board. The crash remains the second deadliest aviation accident in Finland, the first being Aero Flight 311 almost two years earlier.

== Flight chronology ==
Aero Flight 217, operated with a Douglas DC-3, was scheduled to take off at 14:50 GMT and travel along the Helsinki-Turku-Mariehamn route from Helsinki Airport. The crew consisted of pilot Pekka Marttinen, co-pilot Pekka Yli-Niemi and flight attendant Marianne Kullberg. The flight departed later than scheduled, at 15:09 GMT.

Everything proceeded as planned as far as the stopover at Turku Airport. The aircraft departed from Turku with 21 passengers, three crew members, one deadheading passenger, 789 kilograms of cargo and 1,100 litres of fuel. At this time, the weather was foggy and near Aero O/Y's planning minimal limit that would have cancelled the flight. In Mariehamn, horizontal visibility was slightly worse and thus partially under these limits. According to the flight plan, Stockholm Arlanda Airport in Sweden was reserved as a back-up airport for Flight 217.

Nothing unusual was reported via radio during the flight from Turku to Mariehamn, which was flown at 2,000 feet. The aircraft was nearing the non-directional beacon (NDB) "MAR" from northwest so that it was aligned for the final approach already in Godby. It flew past the NDB at 16:57-16:58 GMT and was prepared to land on the runway. However, the aircraft struck trees 1,480 meters before the runway and 50 meters before the final approach beacon ("Locator S"). The airplane had been perfectly aligned for the runway at the time of the contact. The plane hit the ground after rotating leftwards on its longitudinal axis, landing upside down and immediately catching fire.

Flight attendant Kullberg and two male passengers escaped from the burning wreck before rescuers arrived. Everyone else had died either from impact forces or the fire. After Flight 217 had not responded to any calls, the air traffic controller called a major alarm without delay. Rescue work was hindered by foggy weather and poor road conditions in the area of the crash site.

== Mariehamn Airport technical equipment ==
Mariehamn Airport used two radio transmitters for contacting airplanes: the "MAR" and "Locator S" beacons. The airport was not equipped with an instrument landing system (ILS) or a radar; while ILS equipment had been purchased for the airport two years before the accident, local land disputes postponed its installation. A low-power approach lighting system stretched from 1,020 meters before the runway and was powered from the same source as "Locator S", which could mean turning on the lights may have reduced the voltage to the beacon. The area around the beacon, which had the highest obstacle profile, did not have any lights. Contemporary press went so far as to call the landing equipment of the airport a "death trap" after the crash.

== Investigation ==
The subsequent crash investigation by Finland's Accident Investigation Board (AIB) revealed that the deadheading passenger was not included on the plane's flight manifest. The passenger, former Aero O/Y pilot and World War II fighter ace Ilmari Joensuu, was allowed to enter the cockpit by the pilots. Contrary to the speculation in the press following the incident, the AIB report did not link Joensuu's presence in the cockpit to the accident.

The AIB investigation concluded that the crash happened because of lack of awareness on the part of the pilots, either of the plane's altitude or of its location. The misconception of the altitude could have resulted from the altimeter displaying a wrong altitude or the pilots correcting a known altimeter error the opposite way. Another Aero O/Y pilot who had flown the accident aircraft, one Captain Tamminen, had informed investigators that the altimeter had erroneously shown an altitude fifty feet higher than normal the day before the flight. If this error remained, Captain Marttinen might have corrected the error in the opposite direction, resulting in an altitude 100 feet greater than was correct. According to the AIB report, this still would not have been enough to hit the trees, but it would have been possible with an additional error in flying even lower. Technical investigation of the altimeter determined that a new malfunction possibly occurred during the flight.

The other possibility of mistaken location was supported by statements of other Aero O/Y pilots who claimed that the "Locator S" beacon had given wrong readings to the airplane radio compass. This wrong reading may have given an impression that the airplane had passed the beacon earlier than it did in reality. However, the AIB stated that it was unlikely as Flight 217 flew very close to the beacon, which meant the signal must have been strong and that the likely reason was the pilots' misconception of the altitude instead.

The AIB recommended that airlines use stricter weather standards than those prescribed by the International Civil Aviation Organization's Obstruction Clearance Limit (OCL). It also criticized the use of NDB-only landing systems and proposed that ILS and GCA equipment would be speedily taken to use at Finnish airports.

Wreckage from the aircraft was left in the forest in the vicinity of Mariehamn Airport for nearly 55 years, before being removed in 2018 due to environmental concerns. A memorial plaque was then placed at the site.

== See also ==
- Aero Flight 311, Aero O/Y's fatal accident in 1961
