= Hemavan Airport =

Hemavan Tärnaby Airport
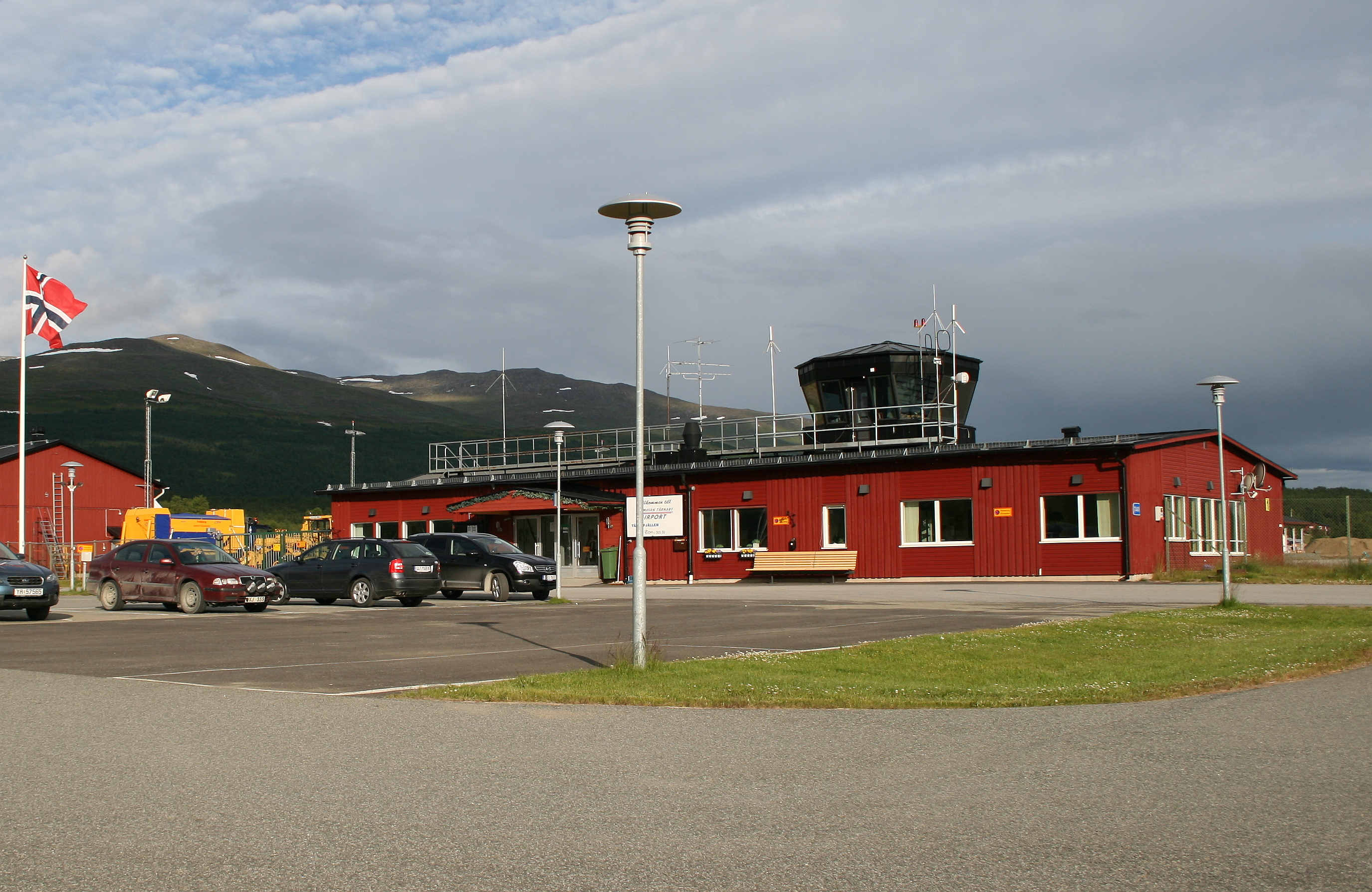
- IATA: HMV; ICAO: ESUT

Summary
- Airport type: Public
- Operator: Storuman Municipality
- Location: Hemavan
- Opened: 1994
- Elevation AMSL: 1,503 ft / 458 m
- Coordinates: 65°48′22″N 015°4′58″E

Map

Runways
Direction	Length		Surface
Direction	ft	m	Surface
15/33	5,254	1,601	Asphalt

Statistics (2018)
- Passengers total: 11,059
- International passengers: 132
- Domestic passengers: 10,927
- Landings total: 437

Hemavan Tärnaby Airport (IATA: HMV, ICAO: ESUT) is an airport in Hemavan, Sweden. The nearest villages are Hemavan and Tärnaby, both of which are ski resorts. Also many Norwegians from Mo i Rana and surroundings use the airport. It is located in Storuman Municipality (Västerbotten County), which was 1994-2010 the only municipality in Sweden with two airports operating scheduled flights. The other airport, Storuman Airport, is closed for traffic since 2010.

== Airlines and destinations ==
The following airlines operate regular scheduled and charter flights at Hemavan Airport:

Airlines	Destinations
PopulAir	Arvidsjaur, Lycksele, Stockholm–Arlanda

== Ground transport ==
Taxis and rental cars are available. The road distance to Hemavan is 1 km, to Tärnaby 19 kilometres (12 mi) and Mo i Rana, Norway, 98 kilometres (61 mi).

== See also ==
- List of the largest airports in the Nordic countries
