= Tärnaby =

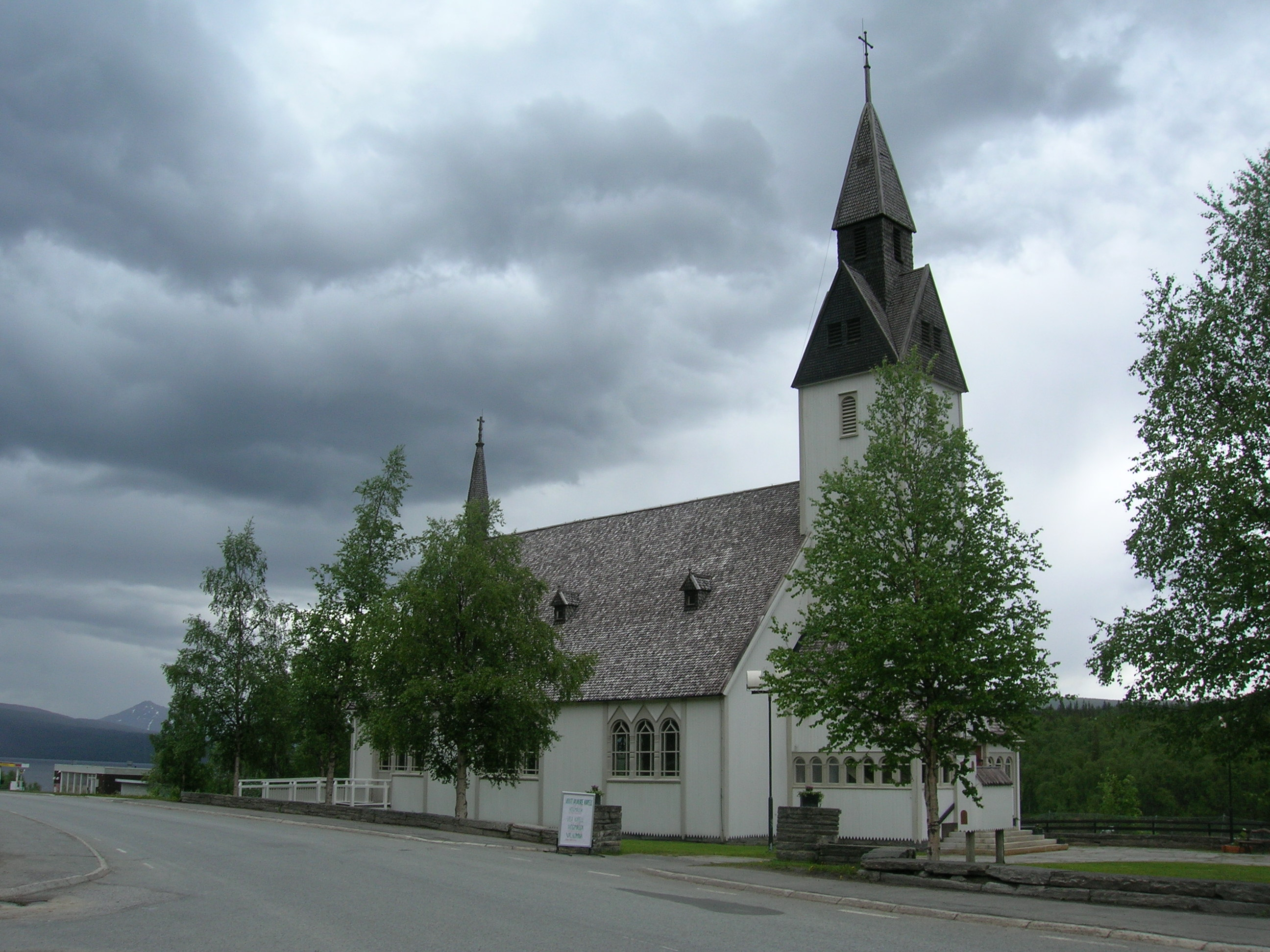
- Tärna Church in mid-June 2008

- Location within Västerbotten Location within Sweden
- Coordinates: 65°43′N 15°16′E
- Country: Sweden
- Province: Lapland
- County: Västerbotten County
- Municipality: Storuman Municipality

Area
  - Total: 1.64 km^{2} (0.63 sq mi)

Population (31 December 2010)
  - Total: 482
  - Density: 294/km^{2} (760/sq mi)
- Time zone: UTC+1 (CET)
  - Summer (DST): UTC+2 (CEST)

Tärnaby is a locality situated in Storuman Municipality, Lapland, Västerbotten County, Sweden with 482 inhabitants in 2010.

It is known for its successful skiers, particularly in the "technical" disciplines: Slalom and Giant Slalom: Ingemar Stenmark, Anja Pärson, Bengt Fjällberg, Stig Strand and Jens Byggmark. In winter, Tärnaby is transformed into one of northern Sweden's ski resorts. By summer, the lakes and mountains provide opportunities for activities such as fishing, canoeing, hiking and mountain biking.

18 km further north in the Parish of Tärnaby is the village Hemavan, a ski resort, with an airport and start point of the Kungsleden trail.

== History ==
Tärna is the latest permanently settled parish in Sweden, with the oldest new construction built in 1824 at Lövlund. However, for centuries before that, the Sami had practiced reindeer herding in the area. There are also around 9,000-year-old Stone Age finds in the area around Tärnasjön.

The Swedish Tourist Association's tourist station in Tärnaby was inaugurated on 14 July 1927, by the county governor (Landshövding). In the early 1950s, after World War II, tourism in Tärnaby began to develop, with the construction of several hotels and ski lifts. In the 1960s, hydroelectric power plants were built, flooding farms and agricultural lands, with the landowners being compensated by the municipality for this intrusion. Since 1971, the parish of Tärna has been part of the municipality of Storuman.

== See also ==
- Blue Highway, an international tourist route (Norway – Sweden – Finland – Russia)
