= Gällivare Lapland Airport =

Gällivare Airport

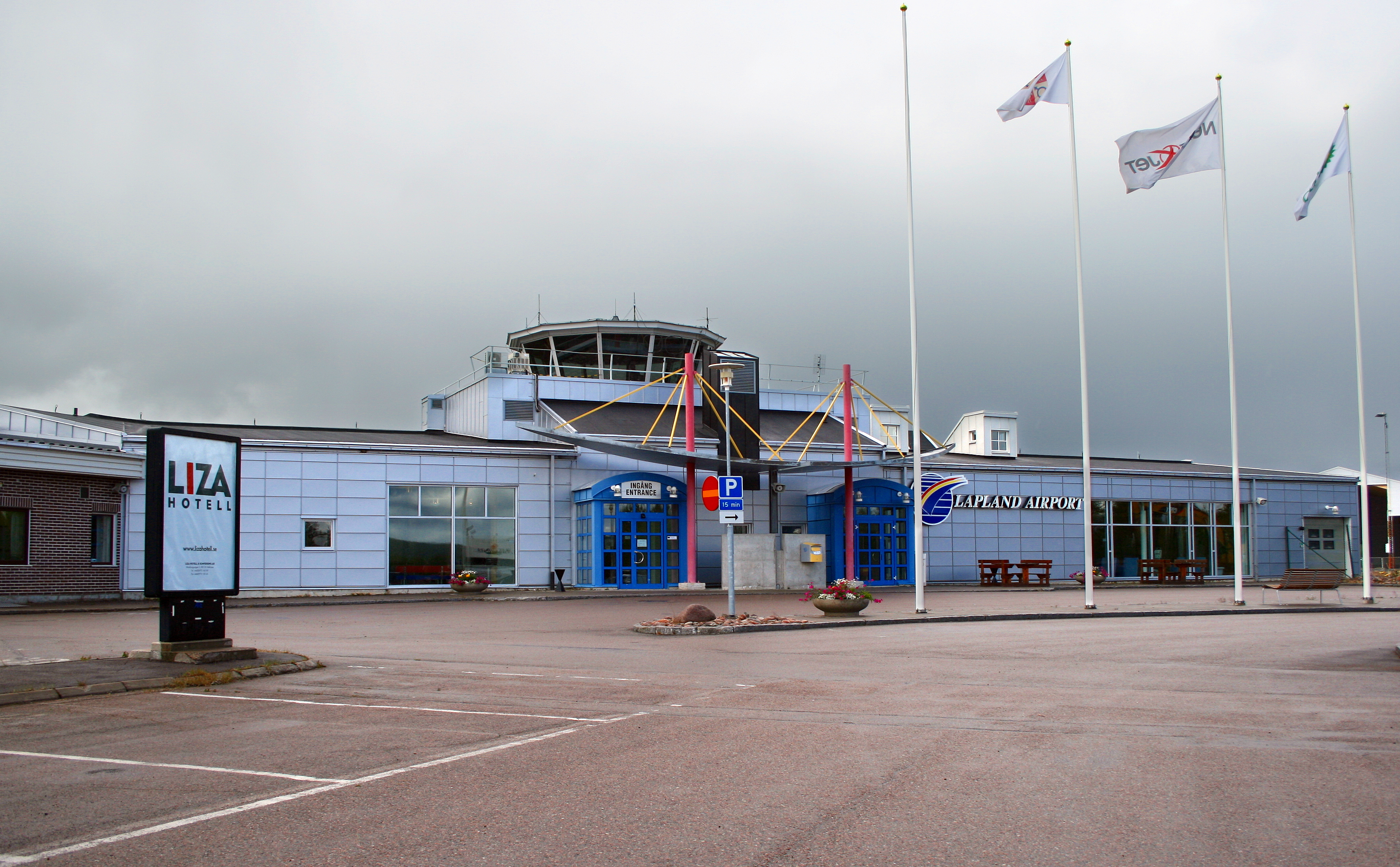
- IATA: GEV; ICAO: ESNG

Summary
- Airport type: Public
- Operator: Gällivare Municipality
- Serves: Gällivare and Malmberget
- Location: Gällivare Municipality, Norrbotten, Sweden
- Elevation AMSL: 1,027 ft / 312 m
- Coordinates: 67°07′59″N 020°48′44″E
- Website: gellivare.se

Map

Runways
Direction	Length		Surface
Direction	ft	m	Surface
12/30	5,610	1,714	Asphalt

Statistics (2018)
- Passengers total: 20,377
- International passengers: 0
- Domestic passengers: 20,377
- Landings total: 1,457

Gällivare Lapland Airport (IATA: GEV, ICAO: ESNG) is an airport located in Gällivare Municipality, Sweden, about 7 kilometres (4 mi) east from Gällivare and about 10 kilometres (6 mi) from Malmberget. The airport has since 2009 been expanded in a project co-financed by the county council and the EU, the airport was also re-branded.

== History ==
The airport was originally a military airfield with three 800-metre (2,625 ft) airstrips called Kavaheden, built during World War II. The sole surviving airstrip was later extended to 1,350 metres (4,429 ft) before being opened to regular civilian flights on 19 April 1971. The airstrip was gradually extended to its current length between 1984 and 1994. In 1989 the airstrip was broadened to 45 metres (148 ft). The airport is one of six airports within Swedish Lapland.

From the bankruptcy of Nextjet on 18 May 2018 until 14 September 2018, there were no regular passenger flights serving Gällivare Lapland Airport. During that period Kiruna Airport operated flight transfer buses to Gällivare. A new operator called LOT Polish Airlines, started operations on the Gällivare – Arvidsjaur – Stockholm route under a new PSO contract on 15 September 2018.

== Airlines and destinations ==
The following airlines operate regular scheduled and charter flights at Gällivare Lapland Airport:

Airlines	Destinations
PopulAir	Kramfors, Stockholm–Arlanda

== Ground transportation ==
There is a taxi stand as well as short-term and long-term parking lots at the airport.

== See also ==
- List of the largest airports in the Nordic countries
