= Vilhelmina Airport =

South Lapland Airport Vilhelmina Airport

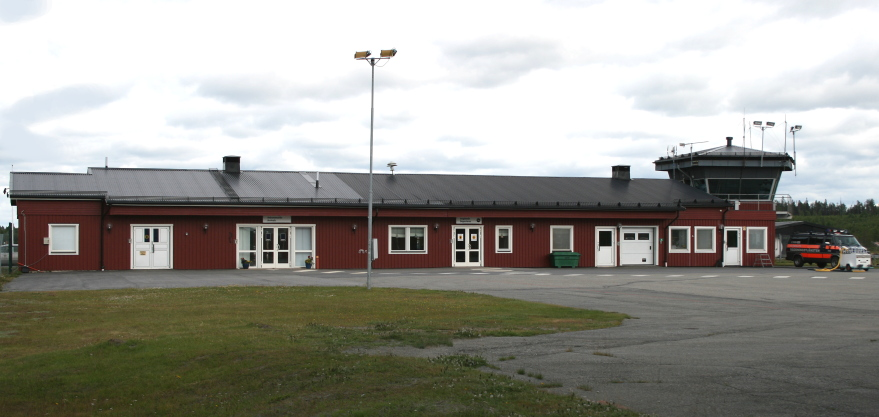
- IATA: VHM; ICAO: ESNV

Summary
- Airport type: Public
- Operator: Vilhelmina Municipality
- Location: Vilhelmina
- Elevation AMSL: 1,140 ft (350 m)
- Coordinates: 64°34′44″N 016°50′00″E

Map
- Location within Västerbotten Location within Sweden

Runways
Direction	Length		Surface
Direction	ft	m	Surface
10/28	4,928	1,502	Asphalt

Statistics (2018)
- Passengers total: 11,424
- International passengers: 3
- Domestic passengers: 11,421
- Landings total: 748

South Lapland Airport (IATA: VHM, ICAO: ESNV) also known as Vilhelmina Airport or Vilhelmina Sagadal Airport is an airport in the village of Sagadal outside Vilhelmina, Sweden.

== History ==
Vilhelmina Airport began regular flights in the early 1970s, initially offering two weekday services on the Vilhelmina–Strömsund–Sundsvall route. The airport has gradually expanded its facilities, adding capacity and routes over the years. In 2001, the Swedish government introduced public service obligations, mandating state-supported flights to ensure rural air access, including daily round-trip flights to Stockholm.

In 2007, Vilhelmina Airport handled 16,293 passengers. Due to the 2010 closure of Storuman Airport, some passengers from Storuman now use Vilhelmina Airport. Renovations have modernised the terminal and upgraded runway surfaces. Plans have been proposed to extend the runway from 1,500 to 2,300 metres to accommodate larger jet aircraft.

On 27 January 2012, Vilhelmina Airport was renamed South Lapland Airport as part of a collaboration between the municipalities of Vilhelmina, Åsele, Dorotea, and Strömsund, which established a joint company, South Lapland Eco Invest AB. This entity aims to extend the airport's runway, currently the shortest in Norrland, to attract larger planes from across Sweden and Europe. The four municipalities hold equal ownership in the new company.

In June 2023, South Lapland Airport projected that it would require 35 million SEK over the next five years for infrastructure and operational improvements. Essential costs include upgrades to aging machinery, resurfacing the runway, and implementing a backup power system. The pandemic initially caused a reduction in traffic, but passenger numbers have recently risen to around 11,000, compared to a peak of 16,000 before 2020. However, ongoing financial shortfalls prompted the municipality to consider staff reductions, which proved challenging due to the specialised certifications required.

== Airlines and destinations ==
The following airlines operate regular scheduled and charter flights at Vilhelmina Airport:

Airlines	Destinations
PopulAir	Arvidsjaur, Lycksele, Stockholm–Arlanda

Flights to Stockholm Arlanda Airport are contracted through the Swedish Transport Administration. Nextjet operated this route from 2008 until its 2018 bankruptcy, using BAe ATP and Saab 340 aircraft. Following Nextjet's collapse, PopulAir began service on 1 July 2018. Currently, the Stockholm service operates twice daily on weekdays and once on Sundays, with no flights on Saturdays. As of March 2020, daily weekday flights were reduced to one due to the COVID-19 pandemic in Sweden.

== Air traffic ==
After NextJet's bankruptcy, the Swedish Transport Administration (Trafikverket) and the government worked for a couple of weeks to restore the routes. Trafikverket used an emergency procedure under the EU's air traffic regulation, awarding Amapola Flyg the routes between Stockholm Arlanda and Hemavan, Vilhelmina and Lycksele for seven months. Services resumed on 1 July, with the Hemavan route stopping at Kramfors/Sollefteå Airport.

== See also ==
- List of the largest airports in the Nordic countries
