= Arvidsjaur Airport =

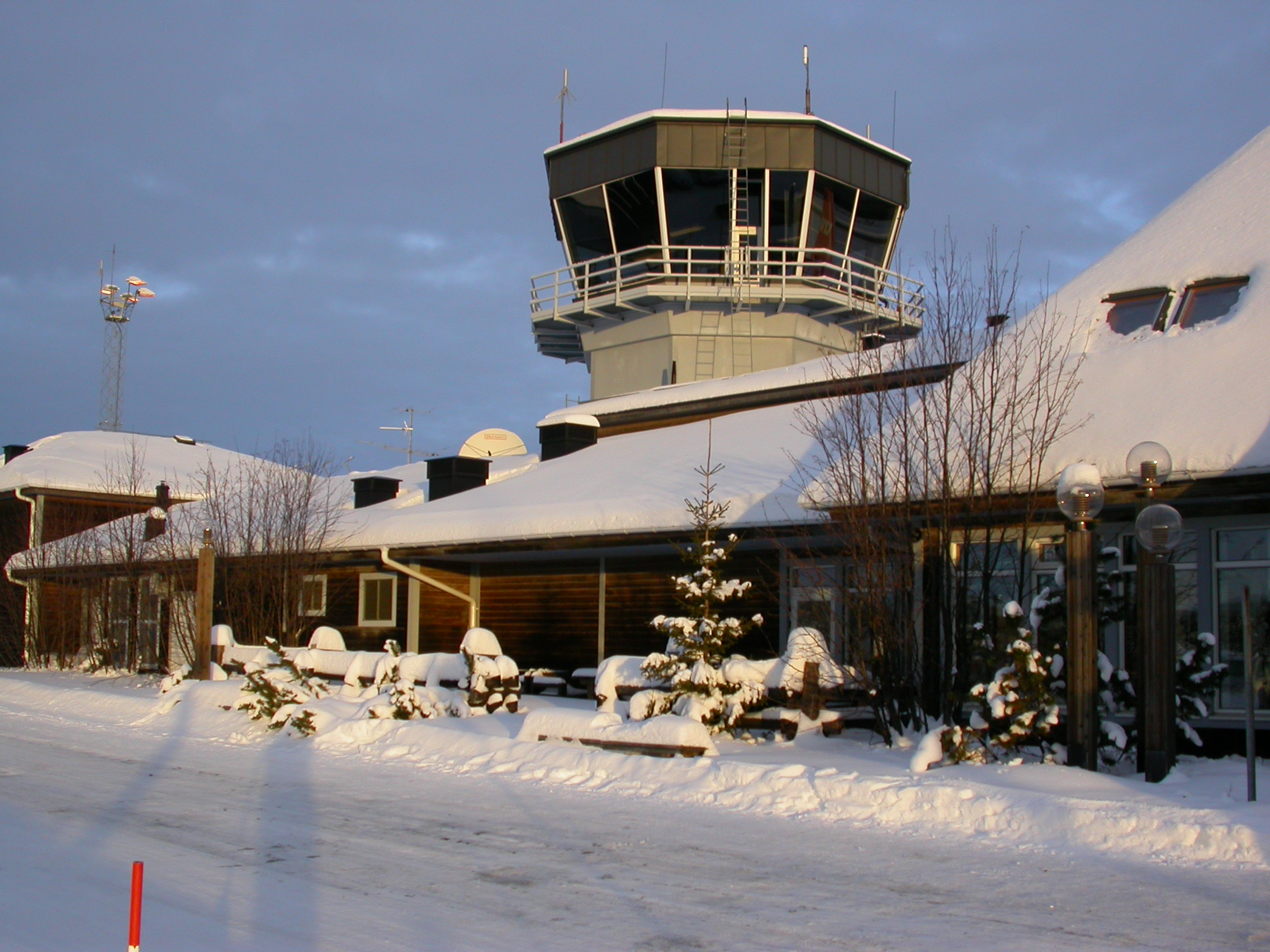
- IATA: AJR; ICAO: ESNX

Summary
- Airport type: Public
- Operator: Town of Arvidsjaur
- Location: Arvidsjaur
- Opened: 1990
- Time zone: CET (UTC+1)
  - Summer (DST): (UTC+2)
- Elevation AMSL: 1,245 ft / 379 m
- Coordinates: 65°35′25″N 019°16′55″E
- Website: arvidsjaurairport.se

Map

Runways
| Direction | Length | | Surface |
| Direction | ft | m | Surface |
|---|---|---|---|
| 12/30 | 8,201 | 2,500 | Asphalt |

Statistics (2016)
- Passengers total: 56,940
- International passengers: 25,738
- Domestic passengers: 31,202
- Landings total (2009): 6,957
- Statistics: Swedish Transport Agency

Arvidsjaur Airport (IATA: AJR, ICAO: ESNX) is situated 13 km (8.1 mi) from Arvidsjaur town in Sweden and had 52,681 passengers in 2018.

== Airlines and destinations ==
The following airlines operate regular scheduled and charter flights at Arvidsjaur Airport.

| Airlines | Destinations |
|---|---|
| Condor | Seasonal charter: Hanover, Munich |
| Eurowings | Seasonal charter: Hanover, Munich |
| LEAV Aviation | Seasonal: Munich |
| PopulAir | Hemavan, Lycksele, Stockholm–Arlanda, Vilhelmina |

The airport is additionally used for irregular leisure and business charter flights during the European winter season.

== Statistics ==
Traffic by calendar year
| Year | Passenger volume | Change | Domestic | Change | International | Change |
|---|---|---|---|---|---|---|
| 2019 | 58,769 | ▲11.6% | 27,912 | ▲29.9% | 30,857 | ▼1.1% |
| 2018 | 52,681 | ▼8.8% | 21,486 | ▼21.4% | 31,195 | ▲2.5% |
| 2017 | 57,760 | ▲1.4% | 27,324 | ▼12.4% | 30,436 | ▲18.2% |
| 2016 | 56,940 | ▲11.3% | 31,202 | ▲3.2% | 25,738 | ▲22.9% |
| 2015 | 51,173 | | 30,239 | | 20,934 | |

== See also ==
- List of the largest airports in the Nordic countries
