= Storuman Municipality =

Storuman Municipality Storumans kommun
- Municipality
- The lake at Storuman seen from the hills above the town

- Coat of arms

- Coordinates: 65°06′N 17°06′E
- Country: Sweden
- County: Västerbotten County
- Seat: Storuman

Area
  - Total: 8,234.1 km^{2} (3,179.2 sq mi)
  - Land: 7,303.53 km^{2} (2,819.91 sq mi)
  - Water: 930.57 km^{2} (359.30 sq mi)
- Area as of 1 January 2014.

Population (30 June 2025)
  - Total: 5,555
  - Density: 0.7606/km^{2} (1.970/sq mi)
- Time zone: UTC+1 (CET)
  - Summer (DST): UTC+2 (CEST)
- ISO 3166 code: SE
- Province: Lapland
- Municipal code: 2421
- Website: www.storuman.se

Storuman Municipality (Swedish: Storumans kommun; Southern Sami: Luspie tjïelte; Ume Sami: Lusspie kommuvnna) is a municipality in Västerbotten County in northern Sweden. Its seat is located in Storuman.

The parish Stensele was created as late as 1822. It was, together with the parish Tärna, made into a municipality in 1863. In 1903 Tärna was detached to form a municipality of its own. The local government reform of 1971 saw the reunification of Stensele and Tärnaby municipalities, thus forming Storuman Municipality with the name taken from its largest town.

Tärnaby, a small village in the municipality, has fostered the internationally famous alpine skiers Ingemar Stenmark, Stig Strand and Anja Pärson.

== Geography ==
With an area of 8,286 square kilometres (3,199 sq mi), the municipality has Sweden's ninth largest area, but is sparsely populated with a population density of less than 1 inhabitant per km^{2}.

=== Localities ===
There are four localities (or urban areas) in Storuman Municipality:

| # | Locality | Population |
|---|---|---|
| 1 | **Storuman** | 2,255 |
| 2 | Stensele | 578 |
| 3 | Tärnaby | 533 |
| 4 | Hemavan/Bierke | 216 |

The municipal seat in bold

== Demographics ==
This is a demographic table based on Storuman Municipality's electoral districts in the 2022 Swedish general election sourced from SVT's election platform, in turn taken from SCB official statistics.

In total there were 5,801 residents, including 4,515 Swedish citizens of voting age. 51.2% voted for the left coalition and 48.0% for the right coalition. Indicators are in percentage points except population totals and income.

| Location | Residents | Citizen adults | Left vote | Right vote | Employed | Swedish parents | Foreign heritage | Income SEK | Degree |
| Location | | | % | % | | | | | |
|---|---|---|---|---|---|---|---|---|---|
| Gunnarn | 560 | 434 | 46.6 | 52.6 | 82 | 93 | 7 | 21,919 | 26 |
| Luspen | 1,941 | 1,427 | 53.3 | 45.8 | 81 | 85 | 15 | 22,257 | 30 |
| Slussfors | 460 | 394 | 55.1 | 44.9 | 85 | 91 | 9 | 19,591 | 31 |
| Tärnaby-Hemavan | 1,519 | 1,238 | 52.1 | 47.2 | 82 | 91 | 9 | 23,698 | 34 |
| Vallnäs | 1,321 | 1,022 | 48.8 | 50.2 | 84 | 92 | 8 | 24,379 | 31 |
Source: SVT

== Transportation ==
Storuman Municipality has two major roads, E12 and E45, crossing in Storuman. An international tourist route Blue Highway (Norway - Sweden - Finland - Russia) goes through Storuman.

There are two railways, Inlandsbanan and the Storuman-Hällnäs Line in Storuman. The former is used for tourist trains in the summer, and both for freight trains.

The nearest airport for the eastern part of Storuman Municipality is Vilhelmina Airport. For the western part, Hemavan Airport is situated near the village centre of Hemavan.

== Sister cities ==
The following cities are twinned with Storuman:

- Viitasaari, Central Finland
