= Stensele =

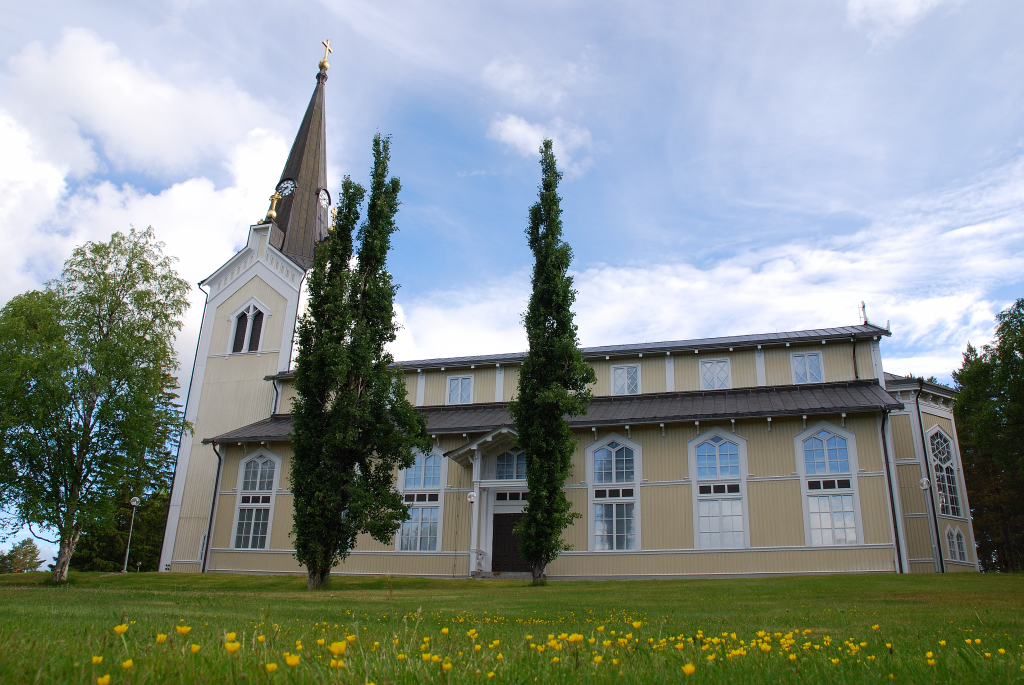
- Stensele Church

- Location within Västerbotten Location within Sweden
- Coordinates: 65°03′59″N 17°09′21″E
- Country: Sweden
- Province: Lapland
- County: Västerbotten County
- Municipality: Storuman Municipality

Area
  - Total: 1.25 km^{2} (0.48 sq mi)

Population (31 December 2010)
  - Total: 546
  - Density: 437/km^{2} (1,130/sq mi)
- Time zone: UTC+1 (CET)
  - Summer (DST): UTC+2 (CEST)

Stensele (Swedish pronunciation: [ˈstěːnsɛlɛ]) is a locality situated in Storuman Municipality, Västerbotten County, Sweden, with 546 inhabitants in 2010. It lies not far from the municipal seat of Storuman itself. The town boasts Sweden's largest wooden church.

== History ==
Stensele is a parish village within the Stensele parish district and was included in the Stensele rural municipality following the municipal reform of 1862. A municipal community for the locality, Stensele municipal community, was established on April 30, 1937, and was dissolved at the end of 1964. Since 1971, the locality has been part of the Storuman Municipality.

== Climate ==
Climate data for Stensele, 1961–1990
Month	Jan	Feb	Mar	Apr	May	Jun	Jul	Aug	Sep	Oct	Nov	Dec	Year
Mean daily maximum °C (°F)	−8.7 (16.3)	−6.3 (20.7)	−1.0 (30.2)	4.0 (39.2)	11.1 (52.0)	16.9 (62.4)	18.3 (64.9)	16.2 (61.2)	10.6 (51.1)	4.7 (40.5)	−2.6 (27.3)	−6.5 (20.3)	4.7 (40.5)
Daily mean °C (°F)	−12.8 (9.0)	−10.7 (12.7)	−5.9 (21.4)	−0.3 (31.5)	6.2 (43.2)	11.8 (53.2)	13.5 (56.3)	11.6 (52.9)	6.8 (44.2)	1.7 (35.1)	−5.6 (21.9)	−10.4 (13.3)	0.5 (32.9)
Mean daily minimum °C (°F)	−17.4 (0.7)	−15.7 (3.7)	−11.2 (11.8)	−4.9 (23.2)	1.0 (33.8)	6.6 (43.9)	8.6 (47.5)	7.0 (44.6)	3.0 (37.4)	−1.3 (29.7)	−9.1 (15.6)	−14.8 (5.4)	−4.0 (24.8)
Average precipitation mm (inches)	34 (1.3)	25 (1.0)	28 (1.1)	26 (1.0)	36 (1.4)	54 (2.1)	88 (3.5)	65 (2.6)	55 (2.2)	42 (1.7)	41 (1.6)	35 (1.4)	529 (20.9)
Source: Hong Kong Observatory.

== See also ==
- Blue Highway, a tourist route (Norway – Sweden – Finland – Russia)
