= Storuman =

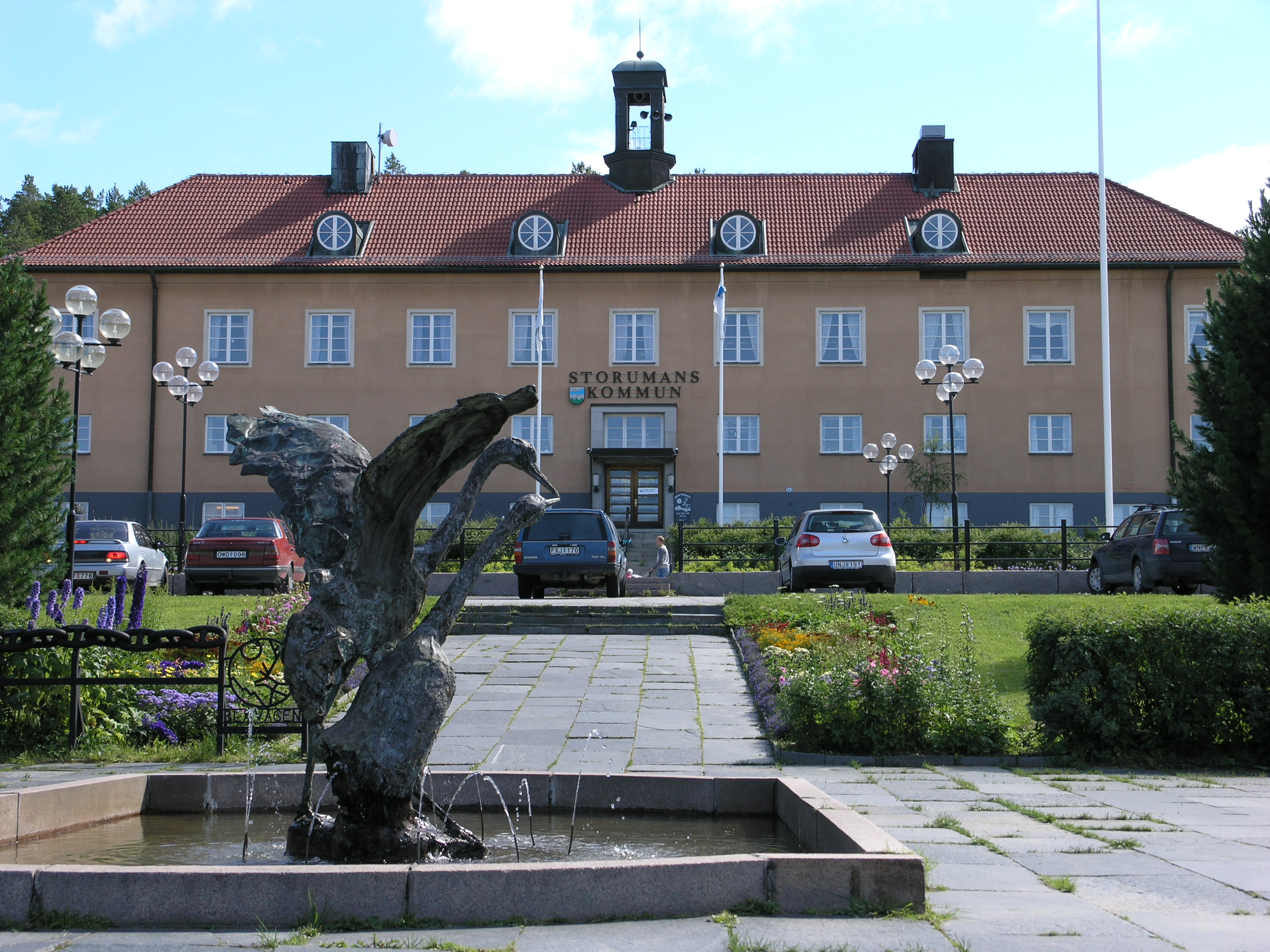
- The municipal building

- Location within Västerbotten Location within Sweden
- Coordinates: 65°06′N 17°06′E
- Country: Sweden
- Province: Lapland
- County: Västerbotten County
- Municipality: Storuman Municipality

Area
  - Total: 3.12 km^{2} (1.20 sq mi)

Population (31 December 2010)
  - Total: 2,207
  - Density: 708/km^{2} (1,830/sq mi)
- Time zone: UTC+1 (CET)
  - Summer (DST): UTC+2 (CEST)

Storuman (Southern Sami: Luspie, Ume Sami: Lusspie) is a locality and the seat of Storuman Municipality in Västerbotten County, province of Lapland, Sweden with 2,207 inhabitants in 2010. It is situated by the Ume River, at the southeastern end of Lake Storuman.

== History ==
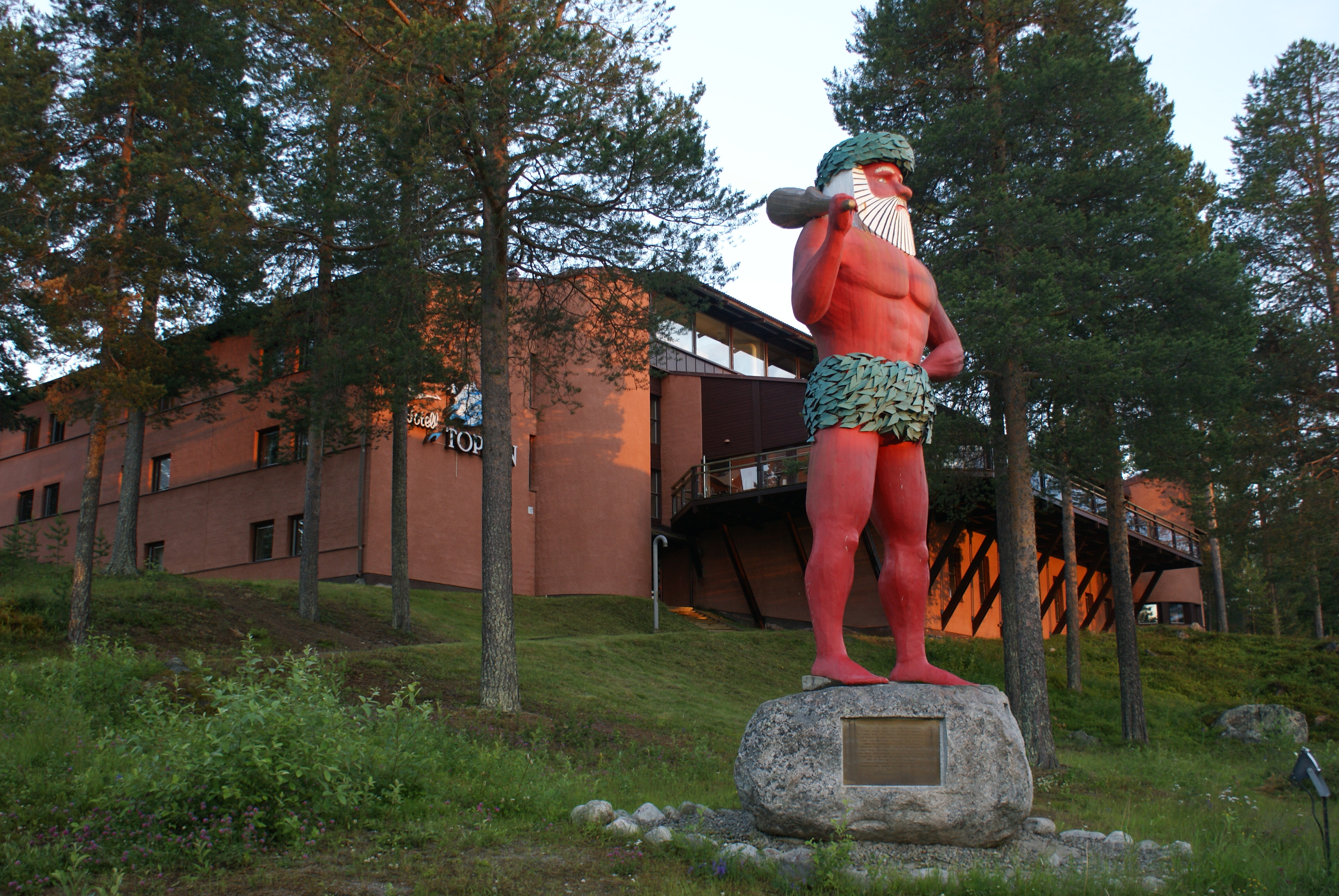
Statue of the Vildmannen (Wild man) in Storuman

It is believed that the first Swedish people who came to the area, were from Vilhelmina to the south and settled here around 1741. The place became known as 'Luspen', derived from a local river of the same name. Until 1912, the population of the village was about 40 inhabitants living in eight farms, but that changed when a railway station was built (Inland Line) around 1924. The village quickly grew and became known as an important centre for hydroelectric power and the timber industry. It later became a popular tourist spot as well.

== Notable people ==
- Johanna Olofsson, professional ice hockey player for Luleå HF/MSSK

== See also ==
- Blue Highway, an international tourist route
