= Hemavan =

- Hemavan in 2024, viewed across Hemavan Airport

- Location within Västerbotten Location within Sweden
- Coordinates: 65°50′N 15°05′E
- Country: Sweden
- Province: Lapland
- County: Västerbotten County
- Municipality: Storuman Municipality

Area
  - Total: 0.91 km^{2} (0.35 sq mi)

Population (31 December 2010)
  - Total: 222
  - Density: 245/km^{2} (630/sq mi)
- Time zone: UTC+1 (CET)
  - Summer (DST): UTC+2 (CEST)

Hemavan (South Sami: Bïerke) is a locality situated in Storuman Municipality, Västerbotten County (Lapland), Sweden with 222 inhabitants in 2010.

It is located on European route E12. During the winter months Hemavan caters to many tourists as a ski resort, mainly from Sweden and the neighbouring countries of Norway and Finland.

Hemavan also has the Hemavan Airport, with one flight per day 6 days of the week to and from Stockholm-Arlanda.

Hemavan is the starting point of the Kungsleden trail.

== History ==
The area was originally named Björkfors in 1834, named by the Sámi Enar Andersson, who later sold the village to another settler family that had come from Stensele parish. When the village was provided with postal and telegraph services in 1918, the name was changed to Hemavan because another Björkfors was registered by the Torne River, and Hemavan was based on the area's 17 "avor's" (cut-off bays) in the Ume River, especially the bay that was closest.

In the beginning, the villagers subsisted on hunting, fishing, and agriculture. The transport route along the Ume River, which people (including those known as "Norgefararna" who traveled to Mo i Rana for trade) used both summer and winter, could only be traveled with skis, sleds, or horse-drawn carts/sledges before it was improved in the 1930s. With the upgrade of this road, the first tourists came to the village, staying with local residents. Hemavan officially became a ski resort when the Högfjällshotellet (1953), Hemavan inn (Wärdshus), completed in 1954, and the first ski lift was inaugurated same year.

In 1993, Hemavan's airport was completed for commercial air traffic, and before this, there was a small airfield for gliders in the 1960s.

== Climate ==
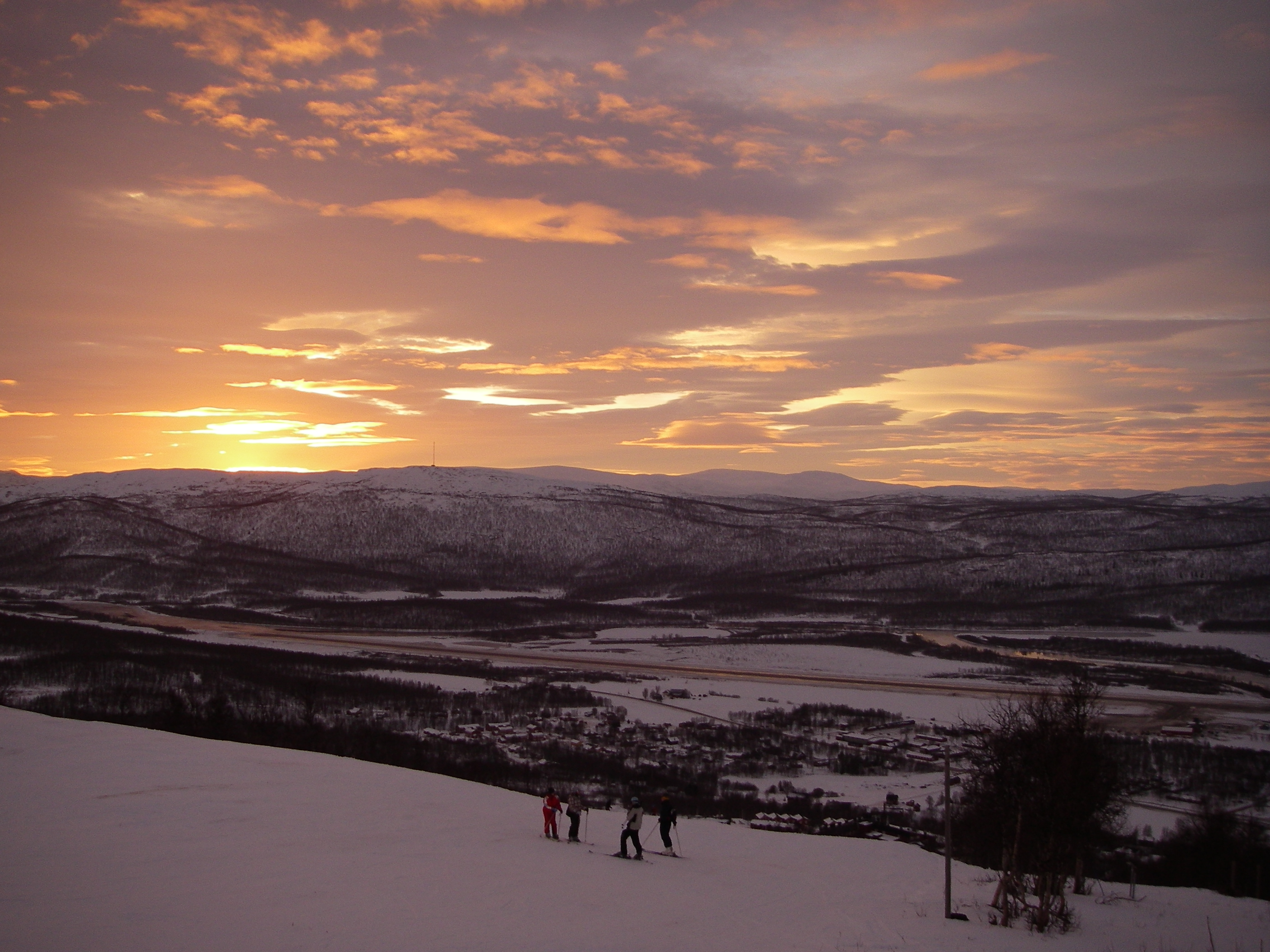
The Hemavan Valley, viewed from the ski resort, just after noon a few days before the winter solstice in December 2007

Hemavan has a subarctic climate (Köppen Dfc) with cold winters and mild summers. Due to North Atlantic low-pressure systems dominating winter months, Hemavan receives sizeable amounts of snow in winter and the cover usually thaws in May.

Climate data for Hemavan Airport 2002–2020 averages; precipitation & snow depth 2002–2018; extremes since 1901
Month	Jan	Feb	Mar	Apr	May	Jun	Jul	Aug	Sep	Oct	Nov	Dec	Year
Record high °C (°F)	7.3 (45.1)	8.3 (46.9)	10.4 (50.7)	14.6 (58.3)	26.1 (79.0)	29.0 (84.2)	31.0 (87.8)	27.6 (81.7)	24.8 (76.6)	17.7 (63.9)	10.6 (51.1)	7.3 (45.1)	31.0 (87.8)
Mean maximum °C (°F)	3.1 (37.6)	3.5 (38.3)	5.2 (41.4)	10.3 (50.5)	18.4 (65.1)	23.0 (73.4)	24.8 (76.6)	23.3 (73.9)	17.8 (64.0)	10.5 (50.9)	5.7 (42.3)	4.2 (39.6)	25.9 (78.6)
Mean daily maximum °C (°F)	−5.6 (21.9)	−4.4 (24.1)	−1.0 (30.2)	3.9 (39.0)	9.3 (48.7)	14.7 (58.5)	18.2 (64.8)	16.3 (61.3)	11.0 (51.8)	4.1 (39.4)	−1.0 (30.2)	−3.0 (26.6)	5.2 (41.4)
Daily mean °C (°F)	−10.0 (14.0)	−8.5 (16.7)	−6.0 (21.2)	−0.3 (31.5)	4.8 (40.6)	9.7 (49.5)	13.0 (55.4)	11.6 (52.9)	7.2 (45.0)	1.3 (34.3)	−4.0 (24.8)	−6.8 (19.8)	1.0 (33.8)
Mean daily minimum °C (°F)	−14.4 (6.1)	−13.5 (7.7)	−10.9 (12.4)	−4.5 (23.9)	0.3 (32.5)	4.7 (40.5)	7.8 (46.0)	6.8 (44.2)	3.4 (38.1)	−1.5 (29.3)	−7.0 (19.4)	−10.5 (13.1)	−3.3 (26.1)
Mean minimum °C (°F)	−31.4 (−24.5)	−31.4 (−24.5)	−27.5 (−17.5)	−17.6 (0.3)	−6.2 (20.8)	−1.0 (30.2)	1.1 (34.0)	−0.4 (31.3)	−3.9 (25.0)	−11.6 (11.1)	−19.7 (−3.5)	−26.9 (−16.4)	−35.1 (−31.2)
Record low °C (°F)	−44.1 (−47.4)	−44.3 (−47.7)	−39.0 (−38.2)	−26.6 (−15.9)	−16.5 (2.3)	−5.0 (23.0)	−1.6 (29.1)	−4.0 (24.8)	−10.1 (13.8)	−23.4 (−10.1)	−38.0 (−36.4)	−48.9 (−56.0)	−48.9 (−56.0)
Average precipitation mm (inches)	72.7 (2.86)	58.7 (2.31)	75.2 (2.96)	46.2 (1.82)	36.3 (1.43)	57.4 (2.26)	81.4 (3.20)	76.5 (3.01)	91.1 (3.59)	62.5 (2.46)	69.4 (2.73)	102.5 (4.04)	829.9 (32.67)
Average extreme snow depth cm (inches)	76 (30)	86 (34)	97 (38)	90 (35)	41 (16)	0 (0)	0 (0)	0 (0)	1 (0.4)	6 (2.4)	27 (11)	57 (22)	102 (40)

Climate data for Hemavan-Gierevarto A 1991-2020 normals (794m)
Month	Jan	Feb	Mar	Apr	May	Jun	Jul	Aug	Sep	Oct	Nov	Dec	Year
Mean daily maximum °C (°F)	−5.6 (21.9)	−6.2 (20.8)	−4.2 (24.4)	0.1 (32.2)	5.3 (41.5)	11.2 (52.2)	14.7 (58.5)	12.9 (55.2)	7.7 (45.9)	1.3 (34.3)	−2.6 (27.3)	−4.5 (23.9)	2.5 (36.5)
Daily mean °C (°F)	−8.1 (17.4)	−8.6 (16.5)	−6.5 (20.3)	−2.6 (27.3)	2.1 (35.8)	7.2 (45.0)	10.7 (51.3)	9.4 (48.9)	5.0 (41.0)	−0.6 (30.9)	−4.7 (23.5)	−6.6 (20.1)	−0.3 (31.5)
Mean daily minimum °C (°F)	−10.4 (13.3)	−10.9 (12.4)	−8.8 (16.2)	−4.9 (23.2)	−0.4 (31.3)	4.1 (39.4)	7.7 (45.9)	6.8 (44.2)	2.9 (37.2)	−2.3 (27.9)	−6.6 (20.1)	−8.8 (16.2)	−2.6 (27.3)
Source: NOAA

Climate data for Hemavan Flygplats 1991–2020 normals (458m)
Month	Jan	Feb	Mar	Apr	May	Jun	Jul	Aug	Sep	Oct	Nov	Dec	Year
Mean daily maximum °C (°F)	−4.9 (23.2)	−5.0 (23.0)	−1.4 (29.5)	3.3 (37.9)	8.7 (47.7)	14.3 (57.7)	17.7 (63.9)	15.9 (60.6)	10.8 (51.4)	4.0 (39.2)	−1.1 (30.0)	−3.5 (25.7)	4.9 (40.8)
Daily mean °C (°F)	−9.1 (15.6)	−9.4 (15.1)	−5.9 (21.4)	−0.9 (30.4)	4.5 (40.1)	9.5 (49.1)	12.6 (54.7)	11.2 (52.2)	6.9 (44.4)	1.2 (34.2)	−4.1 (24.6)	−7.1 (19.2)	0.8 (33.4)
Mean daily minimum °C (°F)	−14.4 (6.1)	−14.9 (5.2)	−11.6 (11.1)	−5.8 (21.6)	−0.2 (31.6)	4.4 (39.9)	7.6 (45.7)	6.6 (43.9)	3.1 (37.6)	−1.8 (28.8)	−7.7 (18.1)	−11.7 (10.9)	−3.9 (25.0)
Source: NOAA

== See also ==
- Tärnaby
