= Höga Kusten Airport =

Höga Kusten Airport Kramfors-Sollefteå flygplats

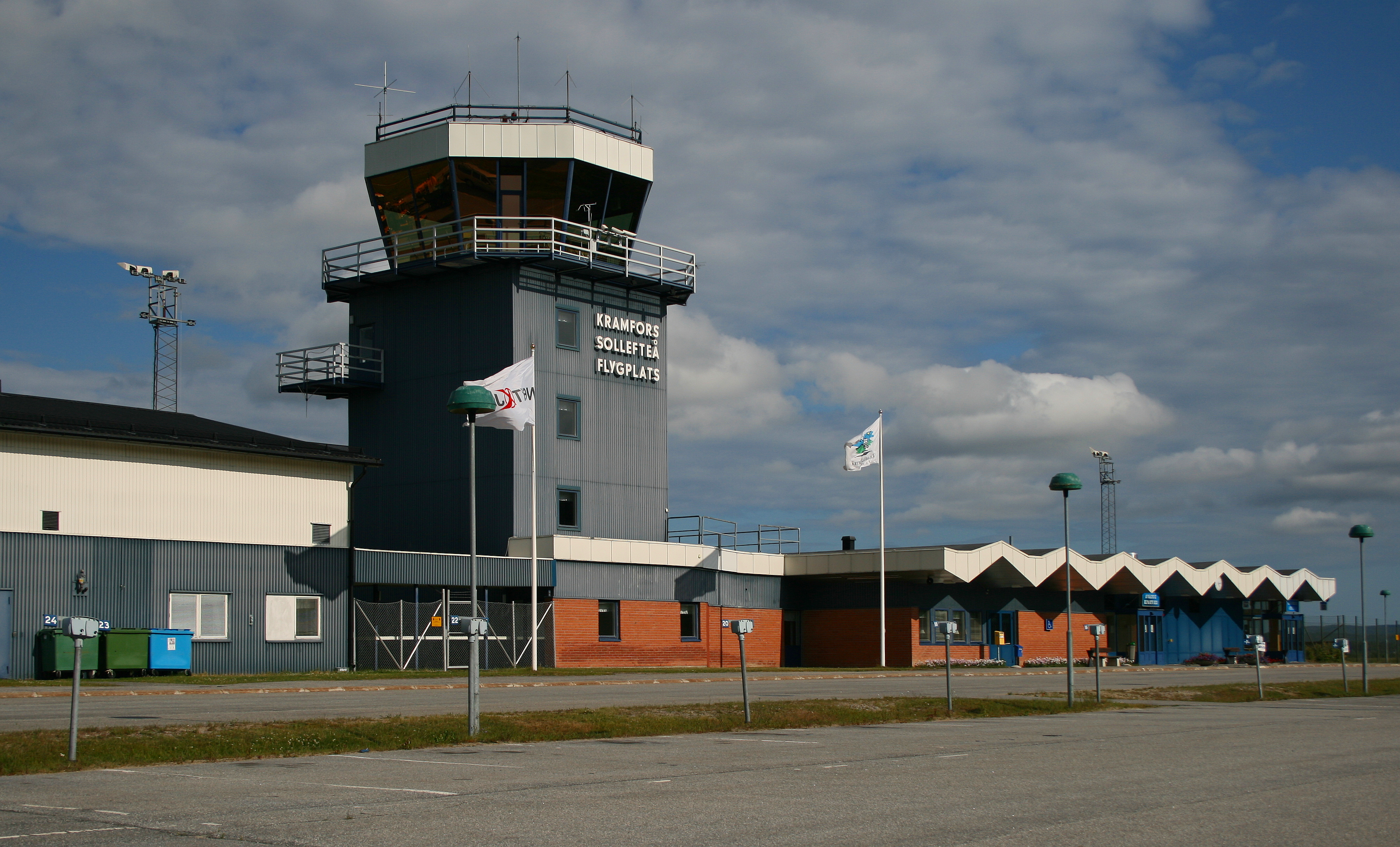
- IATA: KRF; ICAO: ESNK

Summary
- Airport type: Public and other municipalities
- Owner: Kramfors Municipality and Sollefteå Municipality
- Operator: Höga Kusten Airport AB
- Serves: Kramfors, Sollefteå
- Location: Nyland, Sweden
- Elevation AMSL: 10 m / 33 ft
- Coordinates: 63°02′55″N 017°46′08″E
- Website: www.hogakustenairport.se

Map

Runways
Direction	Length		Surface
Direction	m	ft	Surface
17/35	2,001	6,565	Asphalt

Statistics (2016)
- Passengers: 8,735

Höga Kusten Airport (IATA: KRF, ICAO: ESNK), translated High Coast Airport, is an airport situated between the localities Kramfors and Sollefteå in Sweden. Its official name according to the Swedish Aeronautical Information Publication is Kramfors-Sollefteå Airport. The airport is named Kramfors on tickets and flight lists on other airports.

== History ==
The number of passengers in 2017 was 11,396, dropping sharply from 62,000 in 2000 and 18,455 in 2012. The reason for this is low price flights from larger airports relatively nearby like Örnsköldsvik Airport and Sundsvall-Timrå Airport and the 5-hour train connection to Stockholm (started 2012) (travel has not been reduced overall during this period, but Kramfors passengers have to a large extent chosen other routes).

== Airlines and destinations ==
The following airlines operate regular scheduled and charter flights at Höga Kusten Airport:

Airlines	Destinations
PopulAir	Gällivare, Stockholm–Arlanda

== Transportation ==
Ground transport is by taxi, shared taxi, rental car or own car. There is a railway station on the Ådalen Line 1½ km (1 mile) from the airport. Taxi transfer is available, which should be pre-booked.

== See also ==
- List of the largest airports in the Nordic countries
