= Arvidsjaur =

Arvidsjaur Árviesjávrrie
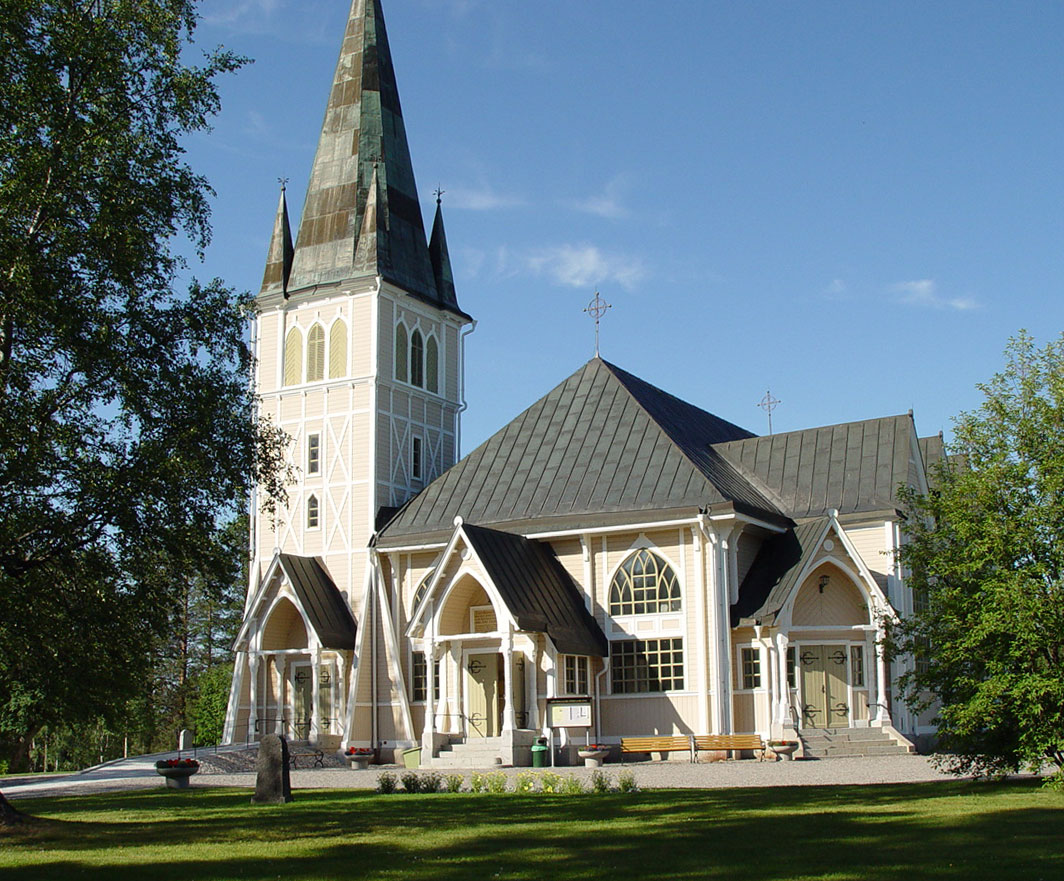
- Arvidsjaur Church

- Location within Norrbotten Location within Sweden
- Coordinates: 65°35′N 19°10′E
- Country: Sweden
- Province: Lapland
- County: Norrbotten County
- Municipality: Arvidsjaur Municipality

Area
  - Total: 4.67 km^{2} (1.80 sq mi)

Population (31 December 2010)
  - Total: 4,635
  - Density: 993/km^{2} (2,570/sq mi)
- Time zone: UTC+1 (CET)
  - Summer (DST): UTC+2 (CEST)

Arvidsjaur (Swedish: [ˈǎrːvɪdsjaʊr]; Ume Sami: Árviesjávrrie; Pite Sami: Árvehávvre) is a locality and the seat of Arvidsjaur Municipality in Norrbotten County, province of Lapland, Sweden with 4,635 inhabitants in 2010.

Arvidsjaur is a center for the European car industry. During the winter months, major car-manufacturers perform arctic trials in the Arvidsjaur Municipality. The town also fosters tourism by offering snowmobile tours, trekking, skiing, fishing and dogsled rides.

== History ==
Arvidsjaur is a Swedish adaptation of the Ume Sámi word árviesjávrrie, derived from árvies ("generous" or "one who gives abundantly") and jávrrie ("lake"), referring to the fishing in the nearby lake of the same name. Aruens järff by was the Swedishized name of the Sámi village where the Arvidsjaur Church was built in 1607. In the Place Name Register, the variants *Arfwids Jerfwi by (1606) and Arfwids Järfwi (1607) are documented.

== Sport ==
The following sports clubs are in Arvidsjaur:

- IFK Arvidsjaur

== Transport ==
Arvidsjaur has established rail and road networks, and also has an airport, with daily flights to Stockholm, and seasonal ones to destinations in Germany. The railway Inlandsbanan has only tourist trains in the summer. There are buses to Gällivare, Östersund, Skellefteå, Piteå, Luleå and more local places.

== Climate ==
Arvidsjaur has a subarctic climate that is dominated by the long winters and briefly interrupted by moderately warm but very bright summers due to its northerly latitude. The highest temperature ever in Arvidsjaur (32.5 °C) was recorded on July 27, 2019.

Climate data for Arvidsjaur, elevation 382 m (1,253 ft) (1991–2020 normals, extremes 1996–present)
Month	Jan	Feb	Mar	Apr	May	Jun	Jul	Aug	Sep	Oct	Nov	Dec	Year
Record high °C (°F)	6.9 (44.4)	7.3 (45.1)	9.7 (49.5)	17.9 (64.2)	27.1 (80.8)	30.2 (86.4)	32.5 (90.5)	29.3 (84.7)	23.2 (73.8)	20.1 (68.2)	10.7 (51.3)	7.8 (46.0)	32.5 (90.5)
Mean daily maximum °C (°F)	−6.3 (20.7)	−5.7 (21.7)	−1.0 (30.2)	4.3 (39.7)	10.9 (51.6)	16.5 (61.7)	19.4 (66.9)	17.2 (63.0)	11.5 (52.7)	3.7 (38.7)	−2.2 (28.0)	−4.6 (23.7)	5.3 (41.5)
Daily mean °C (°F)	−10.3 (13.5)	−10.0 (14.0)	−5.6 (21.9)	0.0 (32.0)	6.1 (43.0)	11.7 (53.1)	14.6 (58.3)	12.6 (54.7)	7.4 (45.3)	0.7 (33.3)	−5.2 (22.6)	−8.3 (17.1)	1.1 (34.1)
Mean daily minimum °C (°F)	−14.9 (5.2)	−14.9 (5.2)	−10.9 (12.4)	−5.0 (23.0)	0.9 (33.6)	6.7 (44.1)	9.8 (49.6)	8.0 (46.4)	3.5 (38.3)	−2.3 (27.9)	−8.8 (16.2)	−12.5 (9.5)	−3.4 (25.9)
Record low °C (°F)	−41.3 (−42.3)	−39.5 (−39.1)	−33.3 (−27.9)	−23.8 (−10.8)	−9.3 (15.3)	−2.0 (28.4)	2.0 (35.6)	−0.8 (30.6)	−6.0 (21.2)	−19.1 (−2.4)	−33.1 (−27.6)	−34.9 (−30.8)	−41.3 (−42.3)
Average precipitation mm (inches)	31.7 (1.25)	24.1 (0.95)	24.1 (0.95)	25.4 (1.00)	41.0 (1.61)	64.7 (2.55)	82.5 (3.25)	74.0 (2.91)	55.7 (2.19)	47.5 (1.87)	40.6 (1.60)	37.8 (1.49)	549.2 (21.62)
Source 1: WMO 1991-2020 Climate Normals
Source 2: SMHI Normals datasheets for the 1991-2020 period

Climate data for Arvidsjaur (2002–2022 averages); extremes since 1996
Month	Jan	Feb	Mar	Apr	May	Jun	Jul	Aug	Sep	Oct	Nov	Dec	Year
Record high °C (°F)	6.9 (44.4)	7.3 (45.1)	9.7 (49.5)	17.9 (64.2)	27.1 (80.8)	30.2 (86.4)	32.5 (90.5)	29.3 (84.7)	23.2 (73.8)	20.1 (68.2)	10.7 (51.3)	7.8 (46.0)	32.5 (90.5)
Mean maximum °C (°F)	2.6 (36.7)	3.7 (38.7)	6.6 (43.9)	12.7 (54.9)	22.6 (72.7)	25.0 (77.0)	26.6 (79.9)	24.6 (76.3)	18.6 (65.5)	11.1 (52.0)	5.4 (41.7)	3.9 (39.0)	27.8 (82.0)
Mean daily maximum °C (°F)	−7.0 (19.4)	−5.4 (22.3)	−0.6 (30.9)	4.8 (40.6)	11.5 (52.7)	17.0 (62.6)	20.0 (68.0)	17.6 (63.7)	11.7 (53.1)	4.0 (39.2)	−2.0 (28.4)	−4.1 (24.6)	5.6 (42.1)
Daily mean °C (°F)	−11.2 (11.8)	−9.9 (14.2)	−5.5 (22.1)	0.2 (32.4)	6.4 (43.5)	12.1 (53.8)	15.1 (59.2)	13.0 (55.4)	7.8 (46.0)	1.0 (33.8)	−5.3 (22.5)	−8.1 (17.4)	1.3 (34.3)
Mean daily minimum °C (°F)	−15.4 (4.3)	−14.5 (5.9)	−10.4 (13.3)	−4.5 (23.9)	1.3 (34.3)	7.1 (44.8)	10.2 (50.4)	8.3 (46.9)	3.9 (39.0)	−2.0 (28.4)	−8.5 (16.7)	−12.0 (10.4)	−3.0 (26.5)
Mean minimum °C (°F)	−30.4 (−22.7)	−29.3 (−20.7)	−25.1 (−13.2)	−14.9 (5.2)	−4.9 (23.2)	1.4 (34.5)	4.8 (40.6)	1.2 (34.2)	−2.9 (26.8)	−12.9 (8.8)	−21.6 (−6.9)	−26.9 (−16.4)	−33.1 (−27.6)
Record low °C (°F)	−41.3 (−42.3)	−39.5 (−39.1)	−33.3 (−27.9)	−23.8 (−10.8)	−9.3 (15.3)	−2.0 (28.4)	2.0 (35.6)	−0.8 (30.6)	−6.0 (21.2)	−19.1 (−2.4)	−33.1 (−27.6)	−34.9 (−30.8)	−41.3 (−42.3)
Average precipitation mm (inches)	30.1 (1.19)	24.2 (0.95)	21.1 (0.83)	23.0 (0.91)	41.0 (1.61)	56.6 (2.23)	81.0 (3.19)	67.6 (2.66)	58.9 (2.32)	44.3 (1.74)	34.9 (1.37)	37.1 (1.46)	519.8 (20.46)
Source 1: SMHI Open Data
Source 2: SMHI Monthly Data 2002–2022

== See also ==
- Skogssamer
