= Mariehamn Airport =

Mariehamn Airport Mariehamns flygplats

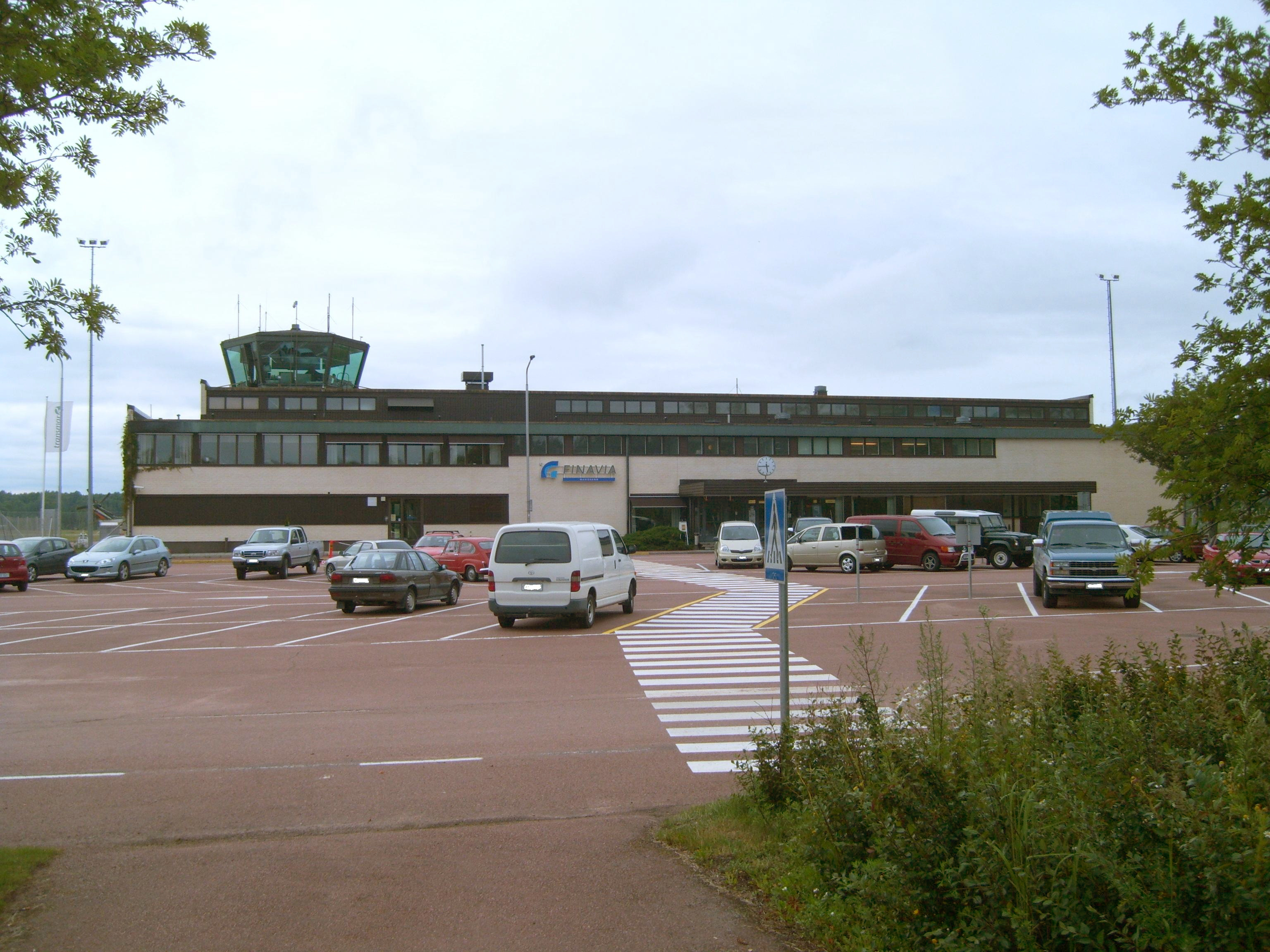
- IATA: MHQ; ICAO: EFMA

Summary
- Airport type: Public
- Owner: Finavia
- Operator: Finavia
- Serves: Mariehamn
- Location: Jomala, Åland, Finland
- Elevation AMSL: 17 ft (5.2 m)
- Coordinates: 60°07′19″N 019°53′47″E
- Website: finavia.fi

Map
- Location within Finland

Runways
Direction	Length		Surface
Direction	m	ft	Surface
03/21	1,903	6,243	Asphalt

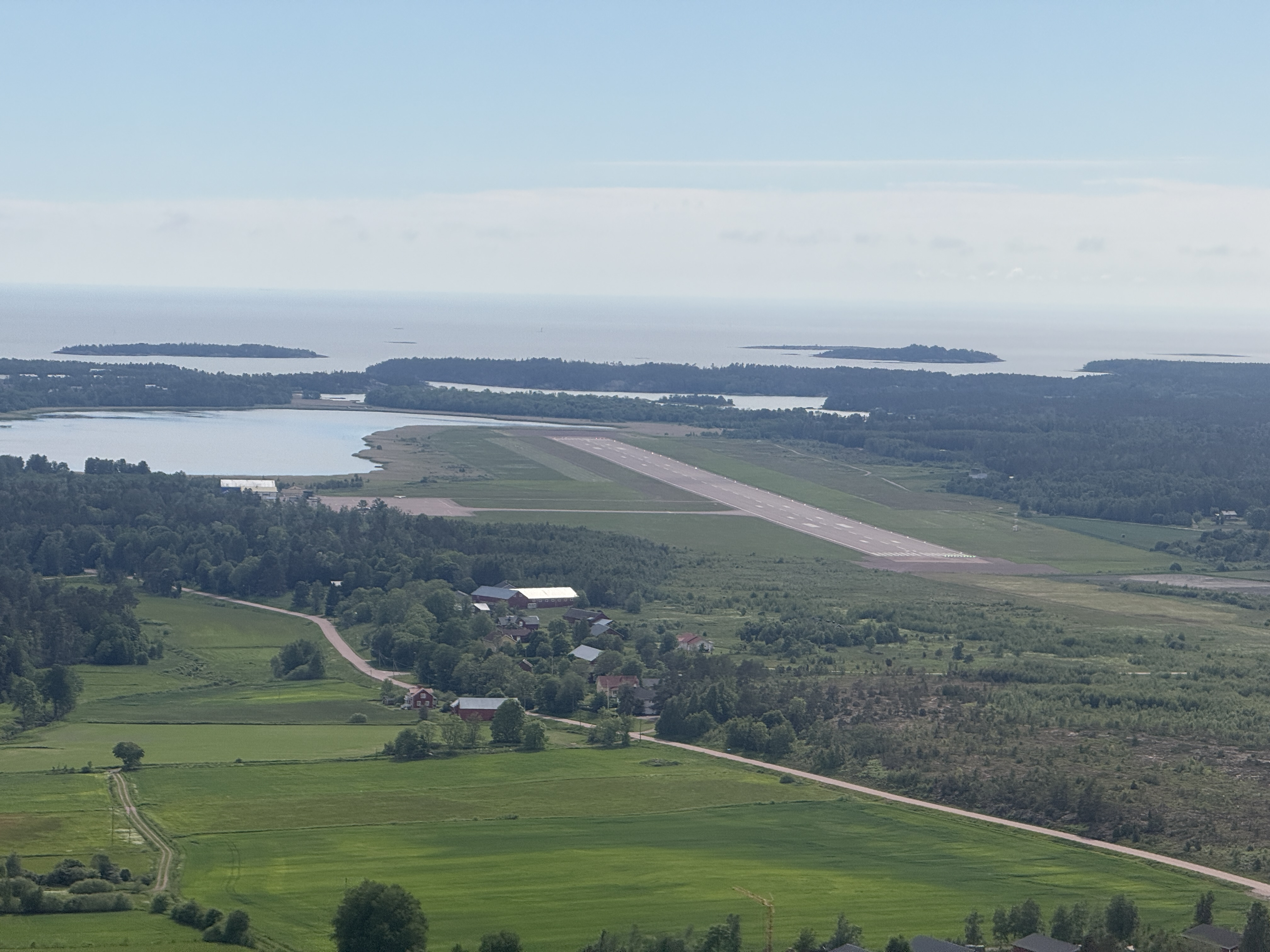
Mariehamn Airport runaway 2026

Mariehamn Airport (Swedish: Mariehamns flygplats, Finnish: Maarianhaminan lentoasema, IATA: MHQ, ICAO: EFMA) is located in Jomala, Åland, Finland. The airport lies approximately 3 kilometres (1.9 mi) north-west of the Mariehamn town centre. The state-owned Finavia operates the airport.

== Airlines and destinations ==
The following airlines operate regular scheduled flights at Mariehamn Airport:

Airlines	Destinations
Finnair	Helsinki
PopulAir	Stockholm–Arlanda, Turku

== Statistics ==
The table below shows annual passenger numbers at Mariehamn Airport.

Annual passenger statistics for Mariehamn Airport
Year	Domestic passengers	International passengers	Total passengers	Change
2005	43,266	4,079	47,345	−18.9% ▼
2006	57,364	6,750	64,114	+35.4% ▲
2007	53,269	10,032	63,301	−1.3% ▼
2008	51,210	10,900	62,110	−1.9% ▼
2009	41,949	14,305	56,254	−9.4% ▼
2010	36,904	11,768	48,672	−13.5% ▼
2011	39,209	14,359	53,568	+10.1% ▲
2012	38,762	14,245	53,007	−1.0% ▼
2013	37,847	14,653	52,500	−1.0% ▼
2014	37,436	14,661	52,097	−0.8% ▼
2015	42,365	16,971	59,336	+13.9% ▲
2016	42,864	16,680	59,544	+0.4% ▲
2017	42,488	19,080	61,568	+3.4% ▲
2018	41,377	13,263	54,640	−11.3% ▼
2019	37,406	14,350	51,756	−5.3% ▼
2020	18,225	5,835	24,060	−53.5% ▼
2021	14,284	4,021	18,305	−23.9% ▼
2022	15,499	11,248	26,747	+46.1% ▲
2023	20,197	17,439	37,636	+40.7% ▲
2024	18,889	20,893	39,782	+5.7% ▲
2025	19,169	23,139	42,308	+6.3% ▲

== Incidents and accidents ==
- On 8 November 1963, Aero Flight 217, a Douglas DC-3, crashed while approaching Mariehamn Airport, resulting in 22 deaths. The crash occurred near the airport.

== See also ==
- List of the largest airports in the Nordic countries
