= Turku Airport =

Turku Airport Turun lentoasema Åbo flygplats

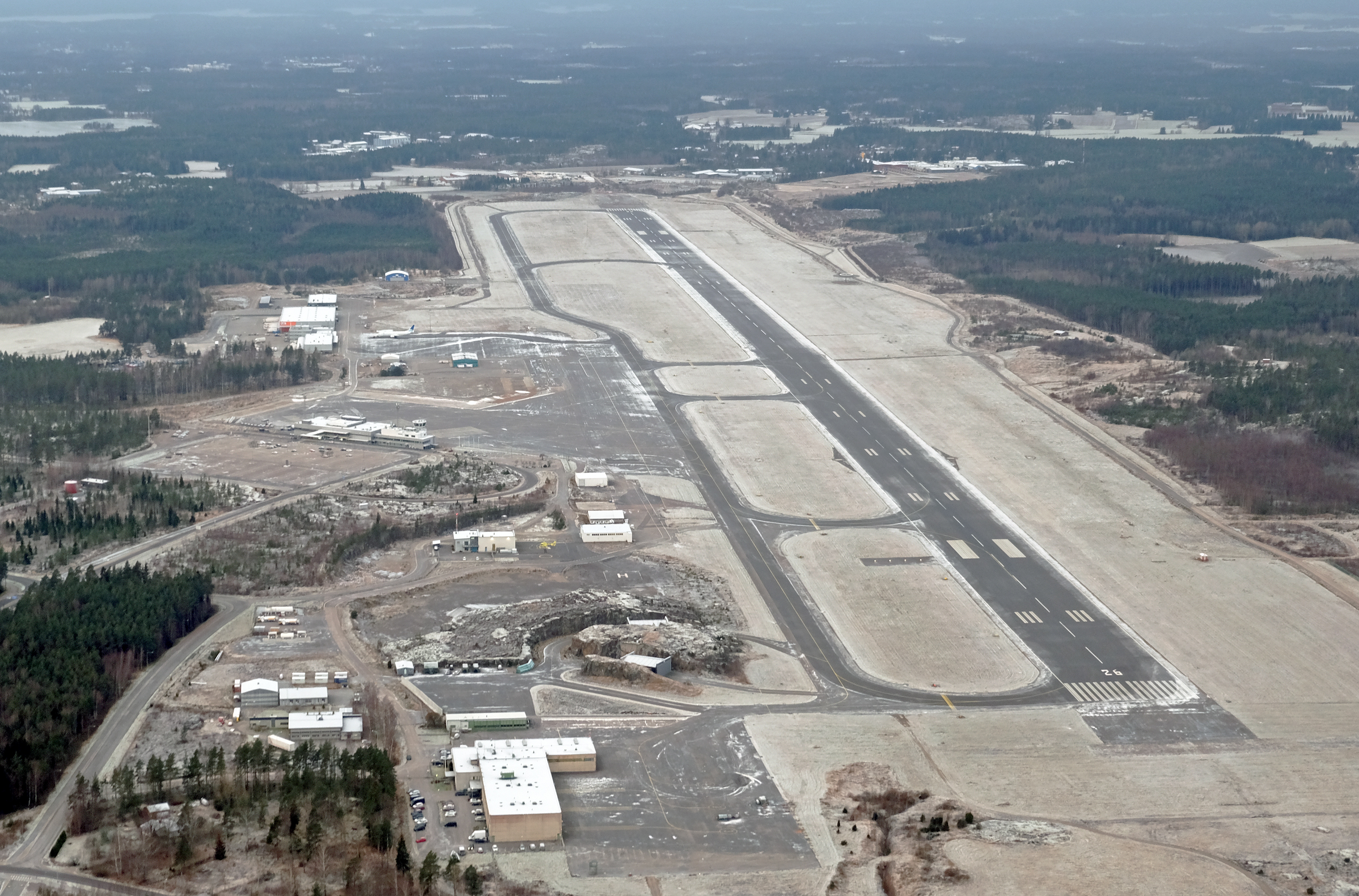
- IATA: TKU; ICAO: EFTU

Summary
- Airport type: Public
- Operator: Finavia
- Serves: Turku, Finland
- Elevation AMSL: 49 m (161 ft)
- Coordinates: 60°30′53″N 022°15′42″E
- Website: finavia.fi

Map
- Location within Finland

Runways
Direction	Length		Surface
Direction	m	ft	Surface
08/26	2,500	8,202	Asphalt

Statistics (2020)
- Passengers: 112,585
- Flight volume: 14,219
- Freight (tons): 3,692 (2019)
- Source: AIP Finland

Turku Airport (IATA: TKU, ICAO: EFTU), is located in Turku, Finland, 8 kilometres (5.0 mi) north of the center, in Lentokenttä (Finnish for 'airfield'; Swedish: Flygfältet) district in the Maaria-Paattinen ward of Turku. It serves approximately 450,000 passengers per year, being the fifth busiest airport in Finland by the number of passengers (in 2025) and the second busiest airport by the amount of cargo tonnes (in 2012). Turku Airport is exclusively operated by the state-owned company Finavia.

== History ==
=== Early years ===
Turku Airport was Finland's first civilian airport when it was built in Artukainen in 1935, but already in the 1920s there was a water airport on Ruissalo Island. Artukainen served as a main airport of Turku until the new airport was built in the municipality of Rusko in 1955. The location became part of Turku in 1957. A new terminal building was opened in 1978. The runway was upgraded to 2500 m in 1980. An air cargo terminal was opened in 1991 as well as an air cargo plate. Terminal 1 was renovated and enlarged in 1999. In the 1990s, Lufthansa CityLine operated flights to Hamburg and ELK Airways to Tallinn.

=== Development during the 2000s ===
Among normal operation the airport offers differentiated service specifically designed for low-cost airlines since 2008. A second cargo terminal was opened in 2003 and a second passenger terminal for low-cost airlines in 2008. Wizz Air launched flights to Turku in April 2008 and airBaltic in July 2009. Wingo xprs operated flights to Stockholm-Bromma in spring 2009 and Jet Air to Gdańsk in 2009–2010.

=== Development since the 2010s ===
Norwegian Air Shuttle flew to Stockholm-Arlanda and Flybe Nordic to Tallinn during the winter season 2011–2012. Ryanair operated flights to Brussels-Charleroi, London-Stansted, Málaga and Barcelona-Girona only during the summer season 2012. According to Ryanair the period was very successful but they could not tolerate the raised airport costs of Finavia and promised to return all routes as soon as the price raise would be withdrawn. During Ryanair's stay there was a 27% growth on passenger statistics. Turku Airport was closed partially in July 2014 for the renovation of the runway and taxiways. Terminal 1 and the passenger apron were also renovated; Finavia budgeted 14 million euros for the renovations and improvements. However, Scandinavian Airlines flights to Copenhagen, one of the most important destinations operated since 2006, were discontinued after the renovations. This had an immediate impact in passenger volumes.

Terminal 2 was closed and its passenger services migrated to the main terminal due to an oil leakage clean up of a spare power unit in autumn 2014. In June 2015 Finavia announced that the low-cost terminal would be completely demolished and the low-cost concept would be continued in the first floor of main terminal in new premises.

In March 2023, Finnair announced the termination of flights between Turku and Helsinki Airport in favor of a coach service due to low demand and the short distance. Finnair resumed flights between Turku and Helsinki on 25 October 2026, with a daily overnight flight; its afternoon flight from Stockholm to Helsinki also stops in Turku.

== Logicity ==
Turku Airport and its surroundings are marketed as LogiCity aiming to attract logistics companies and manufacturers.

Logicity started as a project of Pilot Turku Ltd (founded in 2003) but is now operated by Turku Municipal Property Corporation after the contract with Pilot Turku Ltd ended in 2010. LogiCity will be a logistic hub built around Turku Airport. Logicity is supposed to link the different modes of transportation together. The location is considered ideal due to facts that Turku Airport is just 20 minutes from the sea ports of Turku and Naantali, whose combined values are comparable to the Port of Vuosaari in Helsinki. Both E18 highway to St. Petersburg and E63 to Tampere go via Turku Airport, and also rail transport connection to Russia and China passes by the Logicity area. Pilot Turku describes the Turku Region as "the meeting point of the East, the West and the Nordic countries" and as "the multimodal transport centre of the Nordic Triangle".

Logicity is estimated to create at least 3,000 to 5,000 new jobs. The length of the runway at Turku airport has an option to be upgraded to reach 3,300 m (10,827 ft) to meet new demands. There are several plans set for the nearby area: new roads, commercial centres, retail parks, industrial estates, logistic terminals and offices. In fact there is already a big commercial area along with the E18 ring road just few kilometers from the airport. Logicity is planned in two phases: Phase One allows to build 400,000 m^{2} (4,305,564 sq ft) of floorspace and Phase Two will increase it to 1,000,000 m^{2} (11,000,000 sq ft). The project is regionally important and many towns near the airport (including Turku) are involved in the project as shareholders of Pilot Turku Ltd e.g. Kaarina, Lieto and Naantali.

In 2015, there were three zoning plans pending in the Logicity area: the northern side of the runway, the railway sites on the east and the industrial zones near the railway.

== Airlines and destinations ==
The following airlines operate regular scheduled and charter flights at Turku Airport:

Airlines	Destinations
Aegean Airlines	Seasonal charter: Rhodes
airBaltic	Riga
Finnair	Helsinki, Stockholm–Arlanda (Note: Finnair's afternoon flight from Stockholm–Arlanda to Helsinki stops in Turku. The service runs in that direction only, so Finnair does not fly from Turku to Stockholm.)
PopulAir	Mariehamn
Scandinavian Airlines	Stockholm–Arlanda
Sunclass Airlines	Seasonal charter: Gran Canaria, Tenerife–South
Wizz Air	Gdańsk

== Statistics ==
=== Passengers ===
Annual passenger statistics for Turku Airport
Year	Domestic passengers	International passengers	Total passengers	Change
2006	127,582	212,338	339,920	+3.6% ▲
2007	130,666	178,116	308,782	−9.2% ▼
2008	102,003	216,094	318,097	+3.0% ▲
2009	90,746	187,275	278,021	−12.6% ▼
2010	104,533	252,726	357,259	+28.5% ▲
2011	116,631	260,902	377,533	+5.7% ▲
2012	109,995	344,953	454,948	+20.5% ▲
2013	96,388	228,279	324,667	-28.6% ▼
2014	93,107	204,751	297,858	-8.3% ▼
2015	102,095	210,010	312,105	+4.9% ▲
2016	97,680	226,397	324,077	+3.8% ▲
2017	106,022	227,582	333,604	+2.9% ▲
2018	105,746	263,686	369,432	+10.7% ▲
2019	106,825	346,102	452,927	+22.6% ▲
2020	25,251	87,334	112,585	-75.1% ▼
2021	4,906	46,180	51,086	-54.6% ▼
2022	14,693	118,444	133,137	+160.6% ▲
2023	7,307	225,736	233,043	+75.0% ▲
2024	6,262	248,752	255,014	+9.4% ▲
2025	6,355	272,148	278,503	+9.2% ▲

* During 2014 the airport was operating only 11 months due to renovation of the runway

5 busiest routes by passengers handled:
Rank	Airport (2012)	Passengers (2012)	Airport (2017)	Passengers (2017)	Airport (2018)	Passengers (2018)	Airport (2019)	Passengers (2019)
1.	Helsinki	▼87,362	Helsinki	▲104,486	Gdańsk	▲117,159	Gdańsk	117,261
2.	Stockholm–Arlanda	▲66,761	Gdańsk	▲92,784	Helsinki	▼102,356	Helsinki	▼100,086
3.	Gdańsk	▲61,122	Stockholm–Arlanda	▼83,141	Stockholm–Arlanda	▲85,679	Stockholm–Arlanda	▲86,331
4.	Copenhagen	▼53,567	Riga	▲30,824	Riga	▲35,132	Riga	▲45,536
5.	Riga	▼32,828	Mariehamn	19,477	Mariehamn	▲24,446	Krakow	▲26,592

=== Freight and mail ===
Loaded/Unloaded freight and mail (tons) Turku Airport
Year	Domestic freight	Domestic mail	International freight	International mail	Total freight and mail	Change
2006	132	260	2,883	3	3,278	+9.8% ▲
2007	50	102	3,304	3	3,459	+5.5% ▲
2008	43	0	4,650	1	4,695	+35.7% ▲
2009	157	0	6,761	0	6,919	+47.4% ▲
2010	72	0	6,988	0	7,061	+2.1% ▲
2011	1	1	7,852	0	7,853	+11.2% ▲
2012	18	0	7,994	0	8,012	+0.2% ▲
2013	0	0	5,342	0	5,342	-33.3% ▼
2014	1	0	3,058	0	3,059	-42.7% ▼
2015	-	-	-	-	4,289	+40.2% ▲
2016	-	-	-	-	3,731	-13.0% ▼
2017	-	-	-	-	3,238	-13.2% ▼
2018	-	-	-	-	4,140	+27.9% ▲
2019	-	-	-	-	3,692	-10.8% ▼

- Finavia has not published Turku Airport's cargo statistics since 2014; 2015–2019 by Eurostat

== See also ==
- List of the largest airports in the Nordic countries
