= Lycksele Airport =

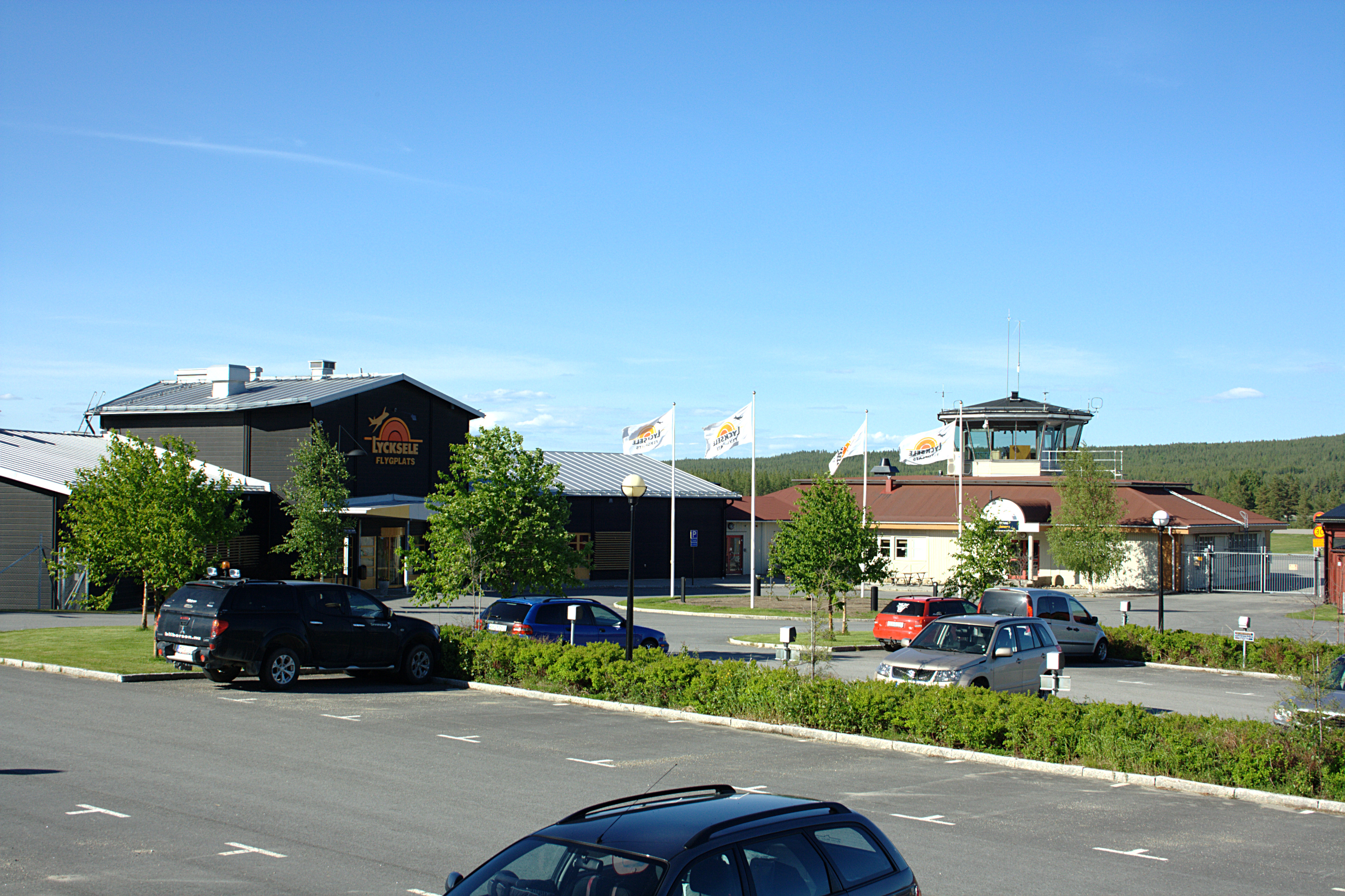
- IATA: LYC; ICAO: ESNL

Summary
- Airport type: Public
- Operator: Lycksele Municipality
- Location: Lycksele
- Elevation AMSL: 705 ft / 215 m
- Coordinates: 64°32′53″N 018°42′58″E

Map

Runways
Direction	Length		Surface
Direction	ft	m	Surface
14/32	6,564	2,001	Asphalt

Statistics (2018)
- Passengers total: 14,201
- International passengers: 149
- Domestic passengers: 14,052
- Landings total: 1750

Lycksele Airport (IATA: LYC, ICAO: ESNL) is a regional airport in Lycksele, northern Sweden.

== Airlines and destinations ==
The following airlines operate regular scheduled and charter flights at Lycksele Airport:

Airlines	Destinations
PopulAir	Arvidsjaur, Hemavan, Stockholm–Arlanda

== See also ==
- List of the largest airports in the Nordic countries
