= Bunge, Gotland =

Bunge
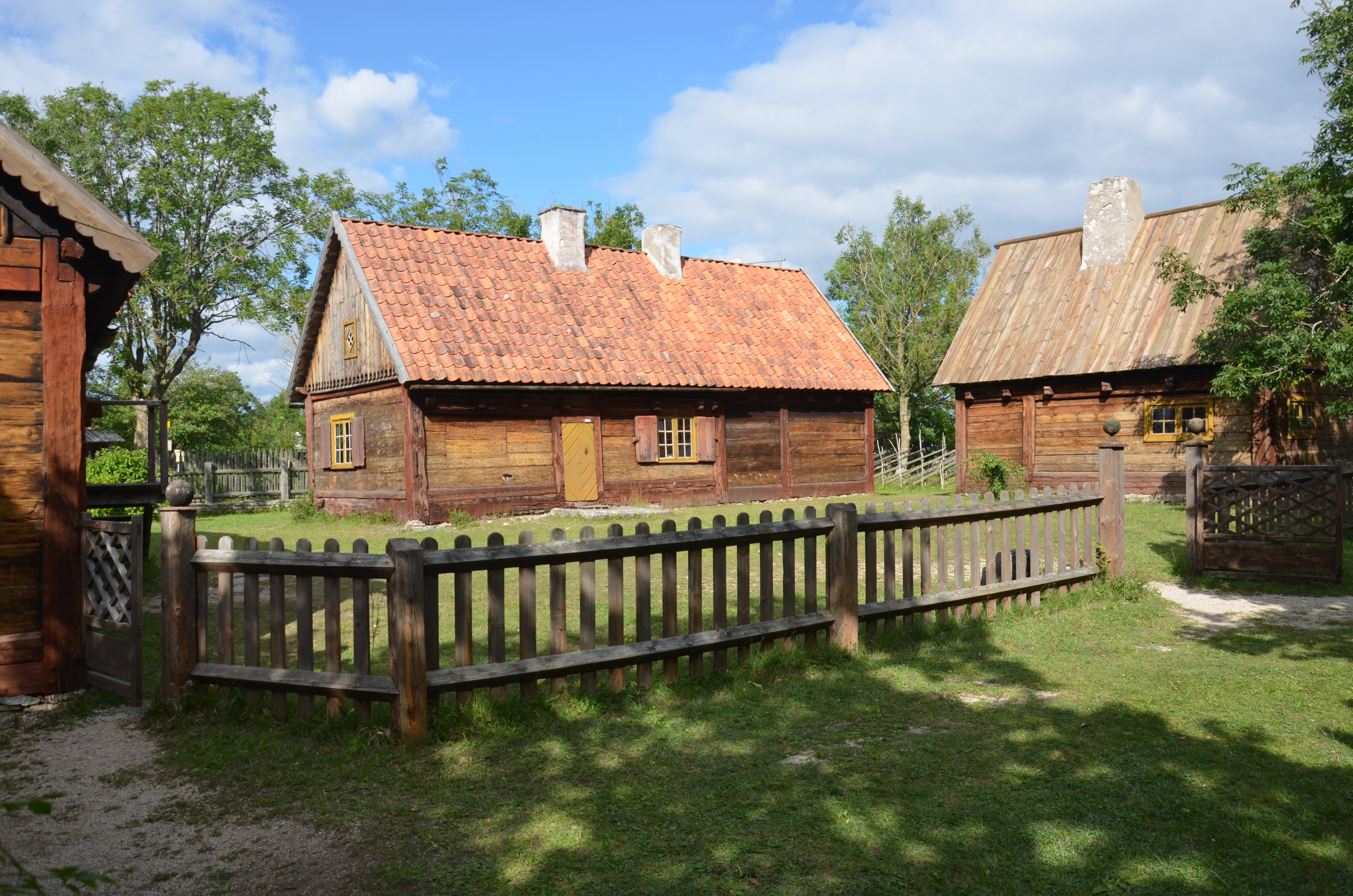
- One of the farms at Bunge Museum

- Location within Gotland
- Coordinates: 57°51′13″N 19°01′24″E
- Country: Sweden
- Province: Gotland
- County: Gotland County
- Municipality: Gotland Municipality

Area
  - Total: 34 km^{2} (13 sq mi)

Population (2014)
  - Total: 886
- Time zone: UTC+1 (CET)
  - Summer (DST): UTC+2 (CEST)

Bunge is a populated area, a socken (not to be confused with parish), on the Swedish island of Gotland. It is situated in the northernmost part of Gotland, southwest of Fårösund. It comprises the same area as the administrative Bunge District, established on 1 January 2016.

== Geography ==
Bunge is the name of the socken as well as the district. It is also the name of the small village surrounding the medieval Bunge Church, sometimes referred to as Bunge kyrkby. It is situated on the north coast of Gotland.

As of 2019, Bunge Church belongs to Bunge-Rute-Fleringe parish in Norra Gotlands pastorat, along with the churches in Rute and Fleringe.

== Places of interest ==
Bunge has a private airfield, the Bunge Airbase. The hangar and the airfield are listed buildings.

Gotland's (and one of Sweden's) most noted open-air museum is the Bunge museum. The museum has farms from three centuries (17th, 18th and 19th) and is also very active in practical old industry such as recreating tar kilns and charcoal piles.

== Notable residents ==
Berta Persson, (1893–1961), first woman bus driver in Sweden, nicknamed Buss-Berta.

== Gallery ==
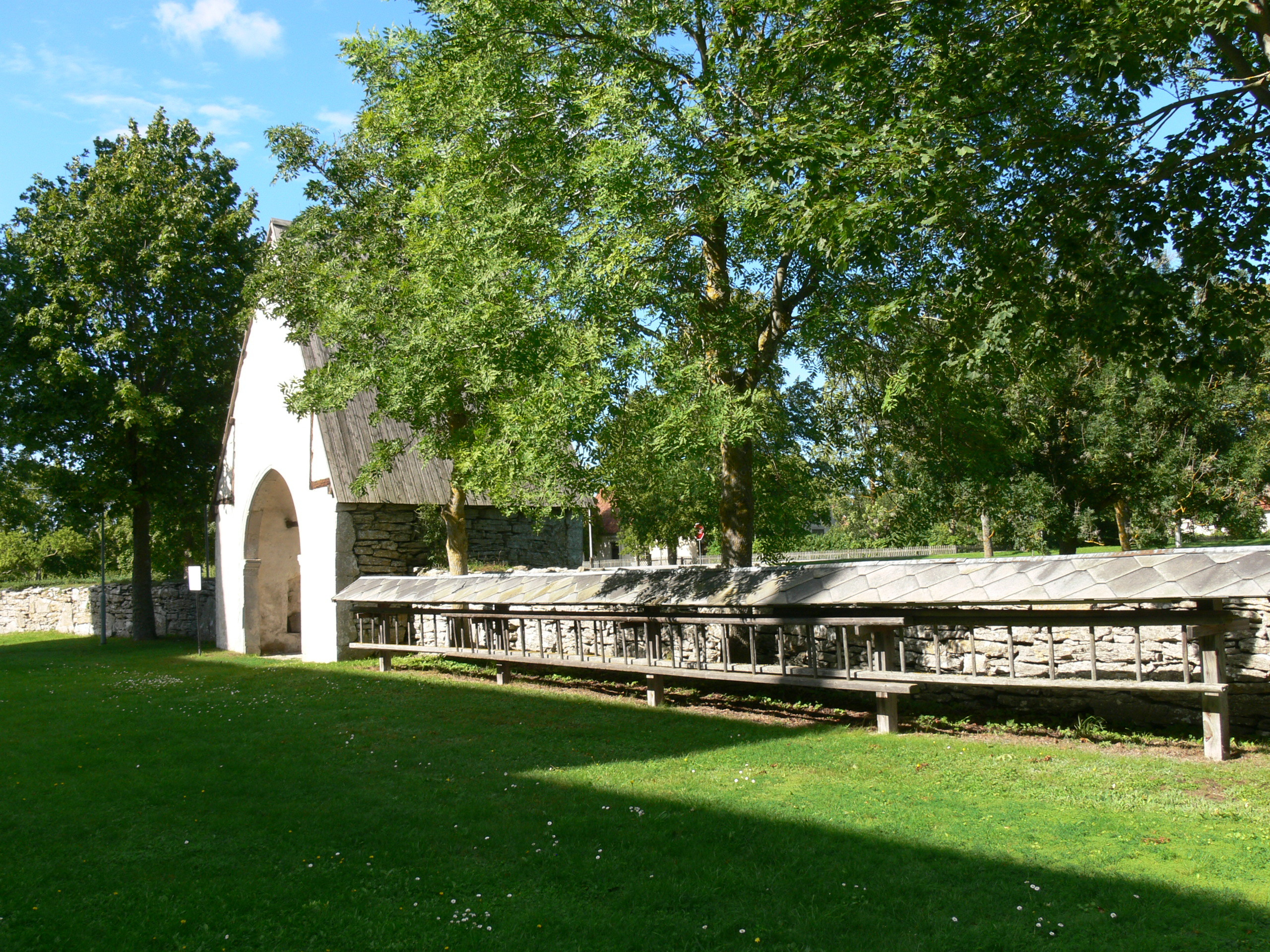
The wall at Bunge church.

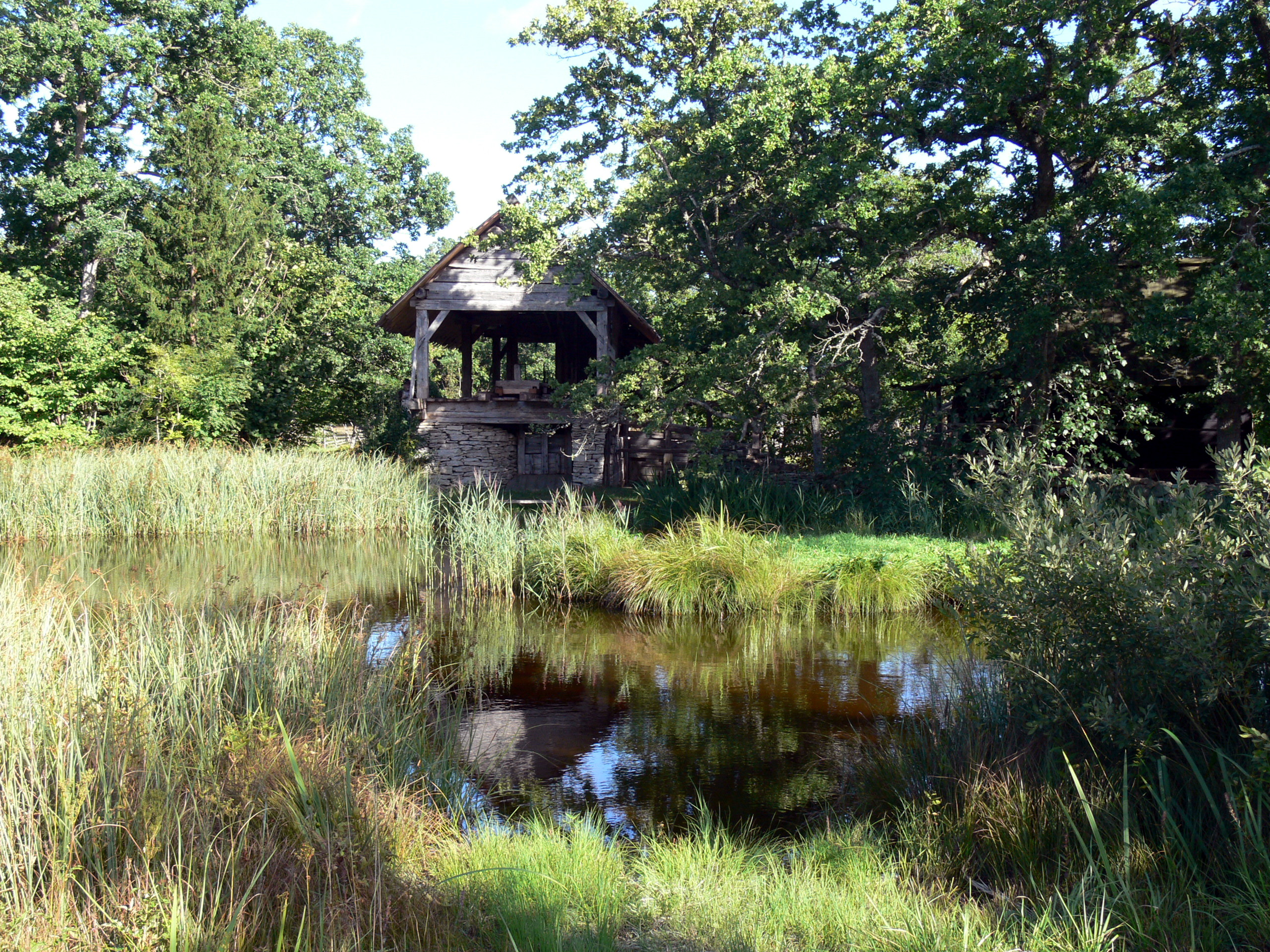
The village pond at Bunge museum.

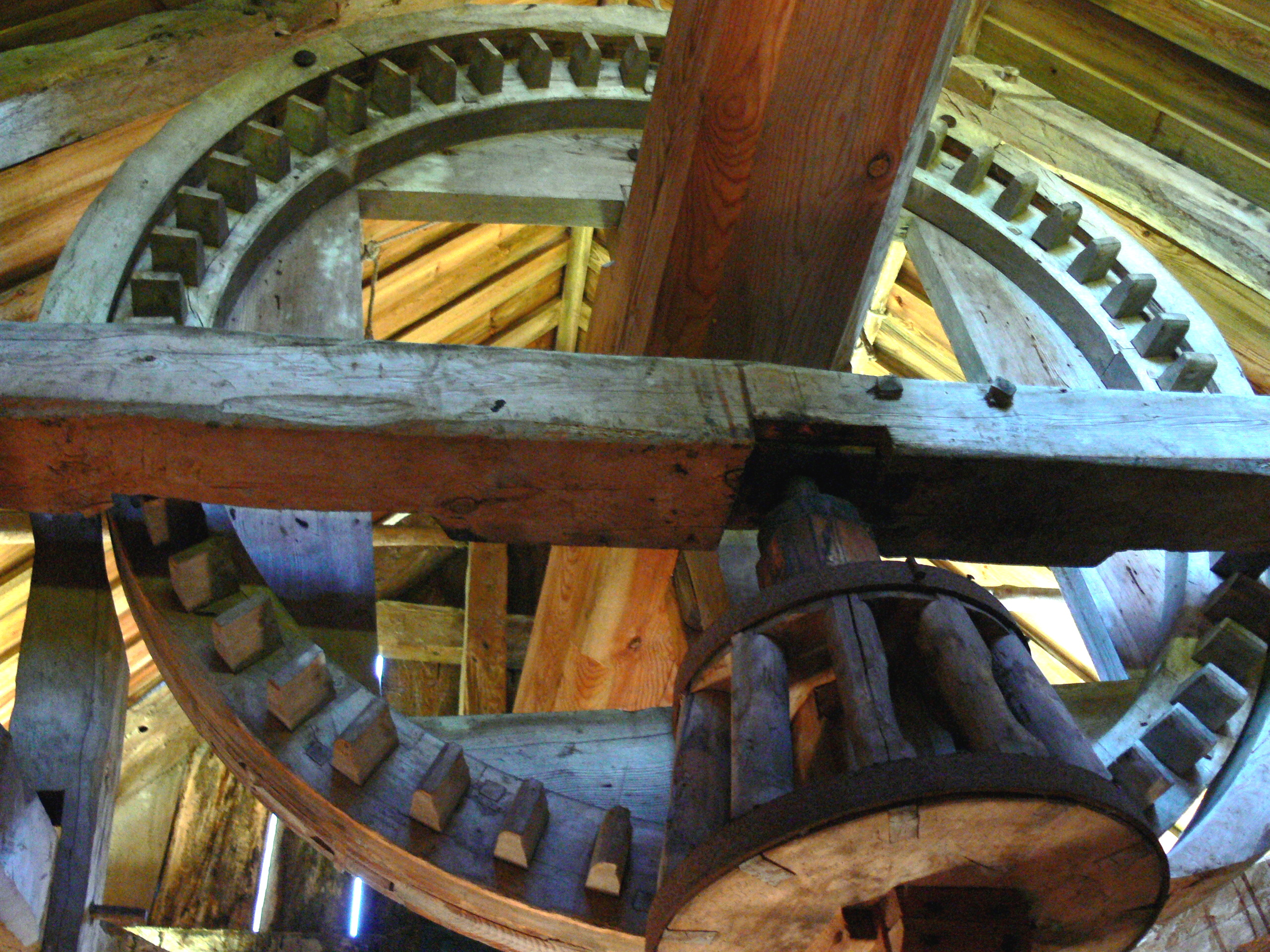
Wind mill at Bunge Museum.

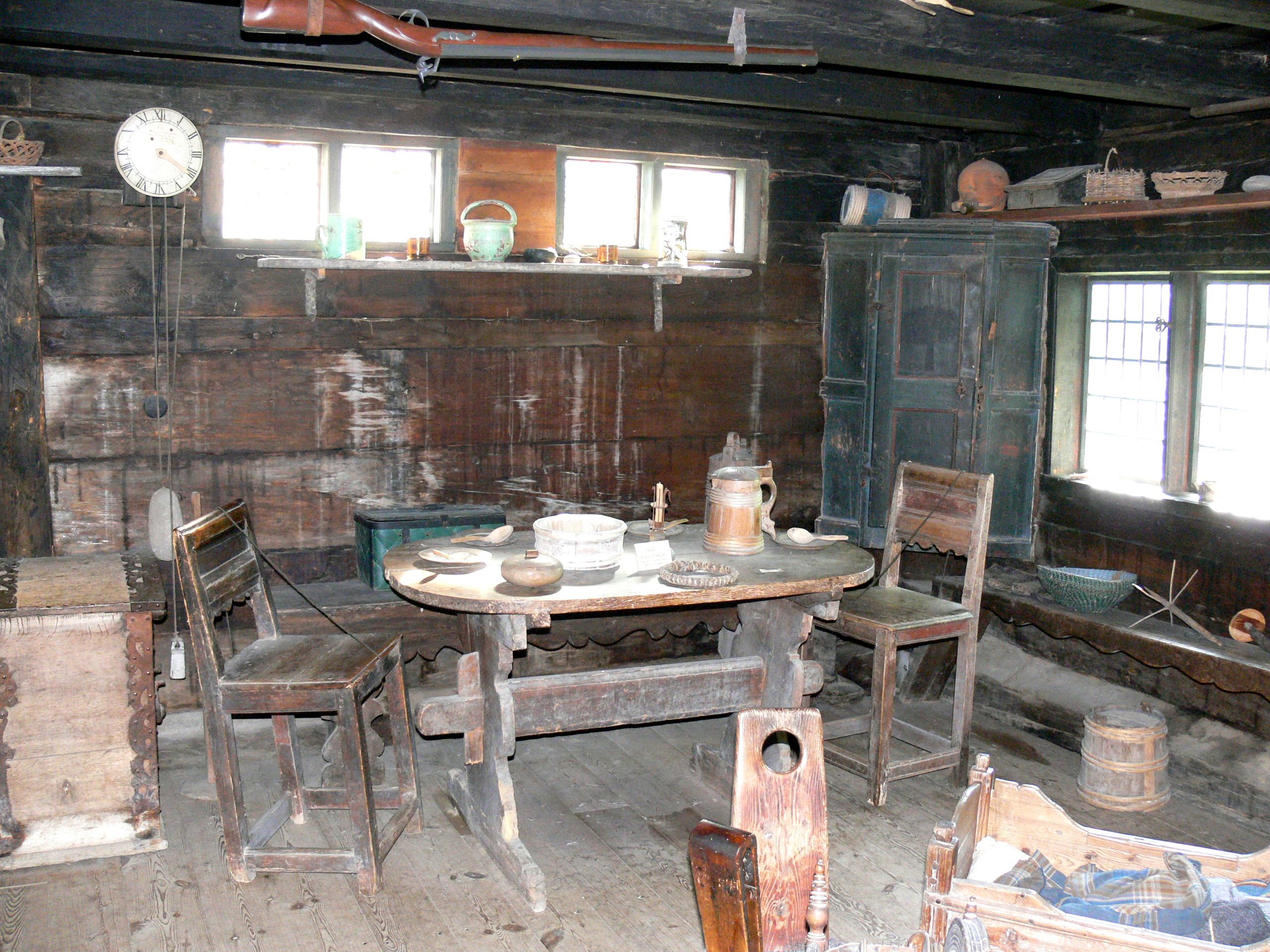
The Bunge Museum.

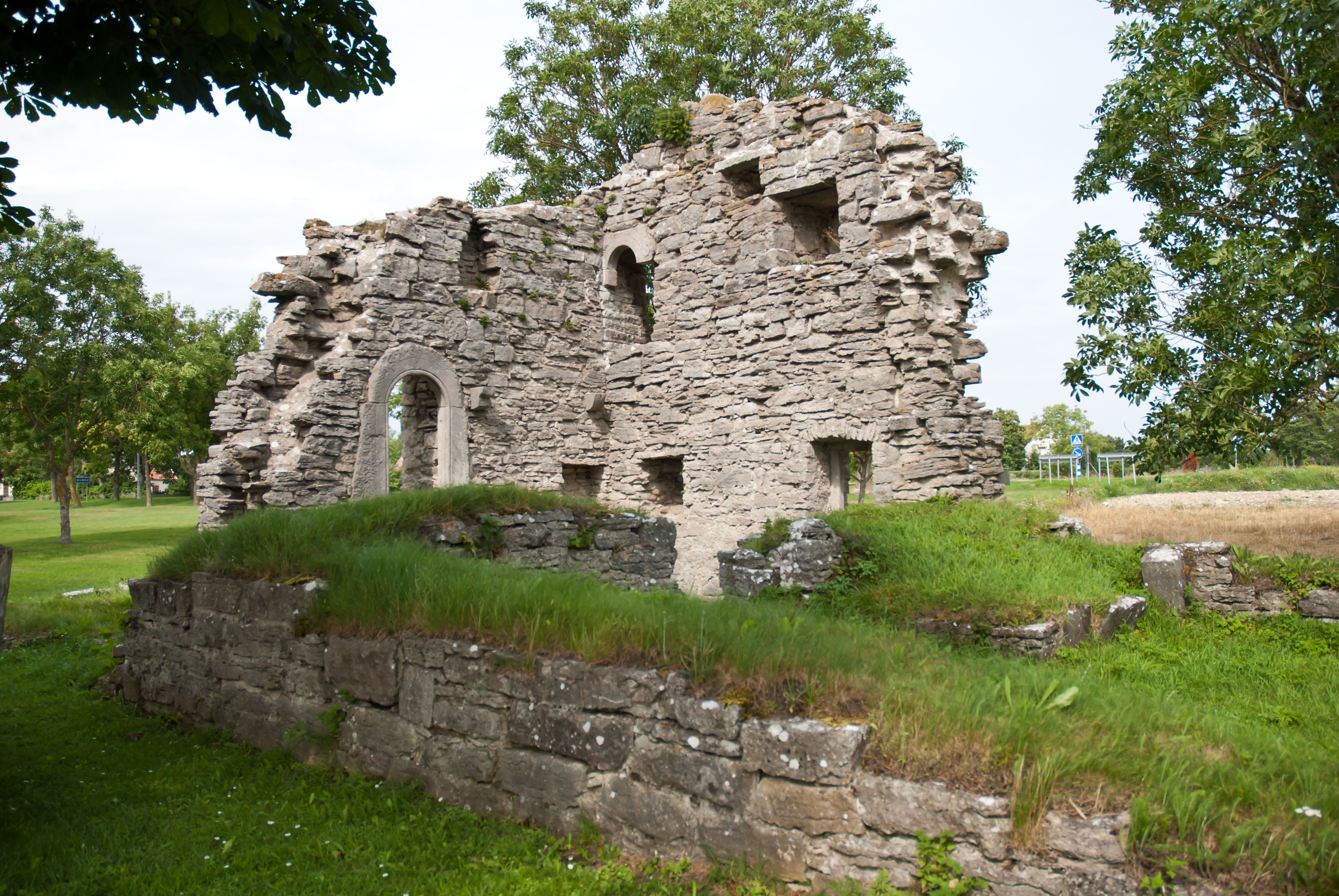
Ruin behind Bunge Church.

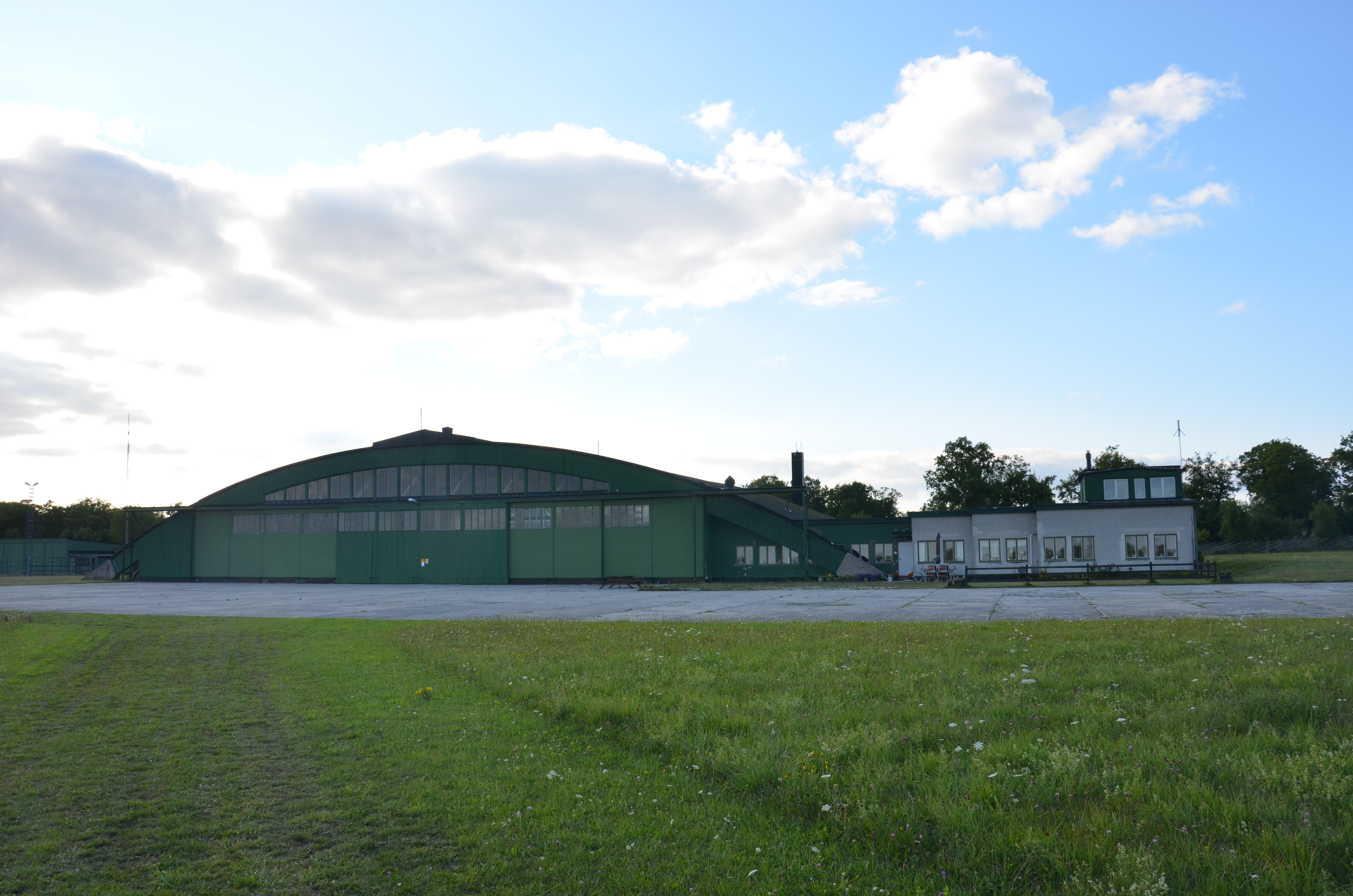
Bunge airfield.
