= Rute, Gotland =

Rute
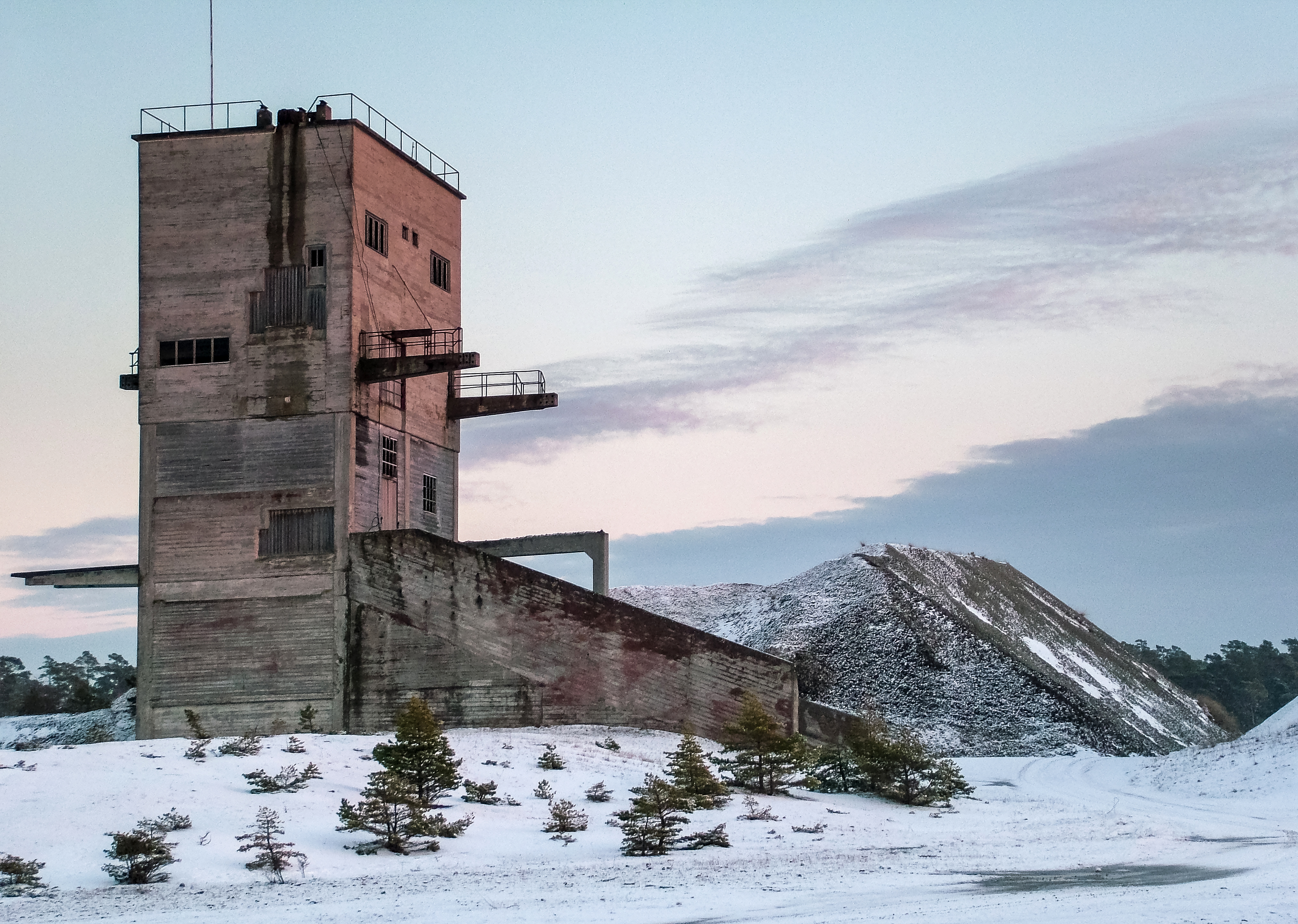
- The old factory on Furillen in Rute

- Location within Gotland
- Coordinates: 57°50′1″N 18°55′24″E
- Country: Sweden
- Province: Gotland
- County: Gotland County
- Municipality: Gotland Municipality

Area
  - Total: 64.45 km^{2} (24.88 sq mi)
- Time zone: UTC+1 (CET)
  - Summer (DST): UTC+2 (CEST)

Rute is a populated area, a socken (not to be confused with parish), on the Swedish island of Gotland. It comprises the same area as the administrative Rute District, established on 1 January 2016.

== Geography ==
Rute is situated on the northeast coast of Gotland. Rute comprises several of the smaller islands off the coast of Gotland, such as Furillen and Skenholmen. Along the coastline are Valleviken harbor and beach as well as Lergrav fishing village. Inland is the north part of Lake Fardume (Fardume träsk), at 3.5 km^{2} (1.4 mi^{2}) it is the third largest lake on Gotland after Lake Bästeträsk and Lake Tingstäde. The medieval Rute Church is located in Rute.

As of 2019, Rute Church belongs to Bunge-Rute-Fleringe parish in Norra Gotlands pastorat, along with the churches in Bunge and Fleringe.

One of the asteroids in the asteroid belt, 10106 Lergrav, is named after Lergrav in Rute.
