= Jaquette Liljencrantz =

Danish writer and women's activist (1848 - 1920)

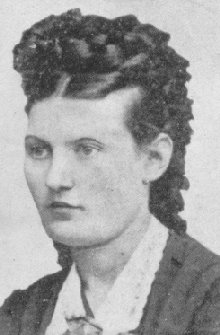
- Born: 4 February 1845; Klara Church Parish
- Died: 13 October 1920 (aged 75); Copenhagen
- Occupation: Editor

Jaquette Liljencrantz (1848–1920) was a Danish (originally Swedish) writer, journalist, Women's rights activist and socialist.

She was employed by the Danish Social Democratic newspaper Social-Demokraten in 1875. She became the first female member of the Social Democrats (Denmark) in 1876.

Her older sister, Lotten von Plomgren (1831-1916), was one of the founders of Svenska kvinnoföreningen för fosterlandets försvar, (the Swedish Women's Association for the Defence of the Fatherland). Her niece was Ida von Plomgren, a Swedish feminist and one of the first Swedish women's foil fencing champions.
