= Berta Persson =

Pioneering bus driver in Sweden (1893–1961)

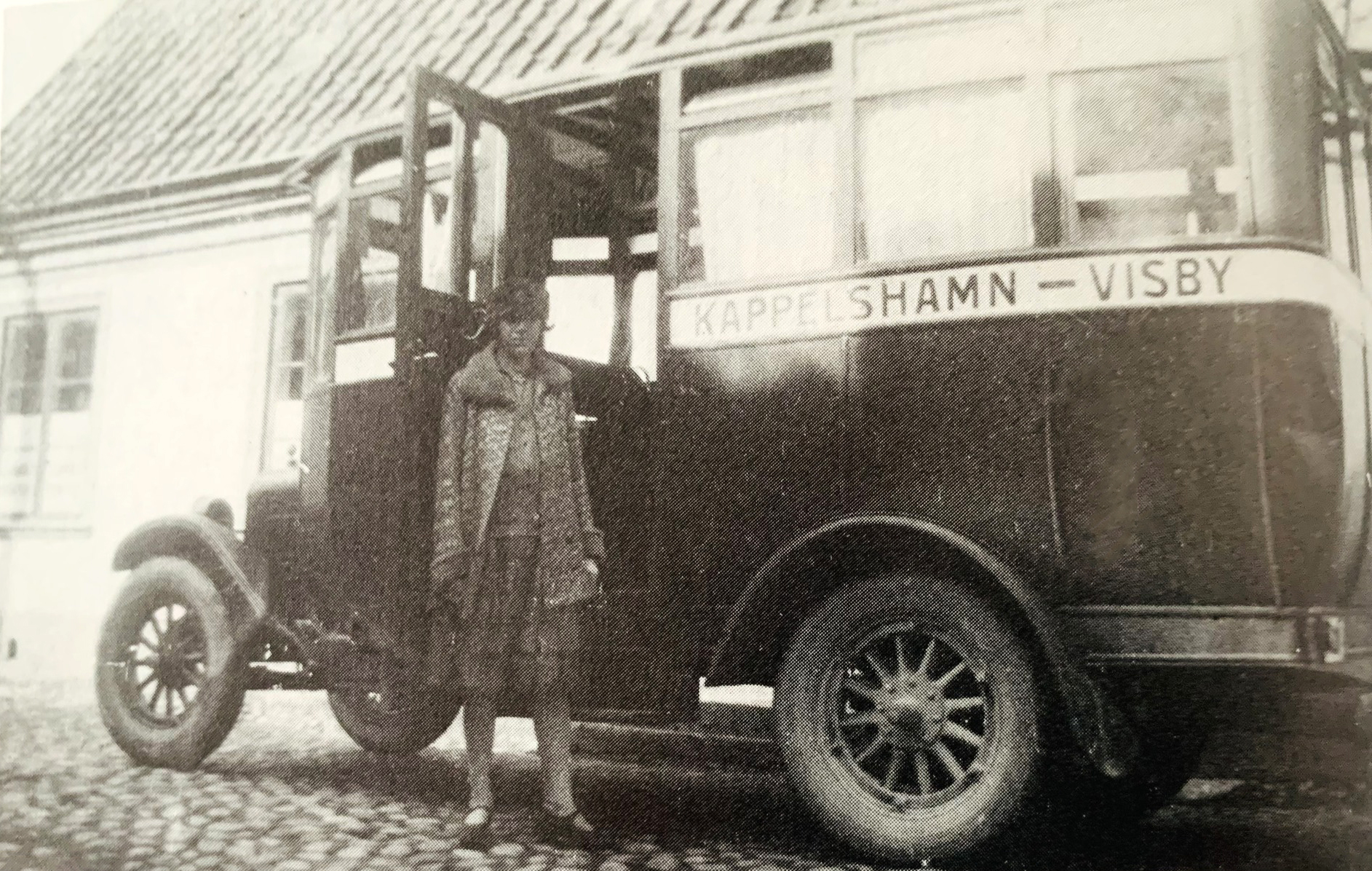
- Berta Persson, aka "Buss-Berta", with her first bus, a 14 seater Chevrolet
- Born: August 11, 1893; Hallgård, Bara, Gotland.
- Died: December 9, 1961 (aged 68); Bunge, Gotland

Berta Persson (née Pettersson) (11 August 1893 – 9 December 1961) was the first female bus driver in Sweden. She was nicknamed Buss-Berta and drove the Kappelshamn–Visby bus route between 1927 and 1934.

== Early life and marriage ==
Berta Albertina Pettersson was born on 11 August 1893 in Hallgård, Bara, Gotland. She was the eldest of five children born to Anna Katarina Amanda (née Fohlin) and Petter Albert Pettersson, also known as Myrman. Persson's father worked as a carpenter. She became a farm maid at age 14 and married her employer's son, Wilhelm, when she was 19. The couple bought a sawmill and moved in above the business. Berta gave birth to seven children during this period, six of whom survived.

== Bus driving career ==
In 1925, when the Kappelshamn to Visby bus line came up for sale, Persson and her husband bought it. The purchase included lorry and taxi services, and the Perssons decided to start a haulage business. They sold their farm, and settled in a two-room apartment in Kappelshamn. Persson took on the running of the business.

The Perssons decided that Berta would be the one to drive the bus. Both she and Wilhelm earned their basic driving licences in 1925, but when Berta Persson tried to get a bus driving licence, she met with resistance from the inspector. He failed her twice because she was a woman. The third time she took the test, Persson made sure that there were male bus drivers as her passengers. With expert witnesses on board, coupled with Persson's skill at driving a bus, the inspector had to approve her licence.

Persson became the first woman to drive a scheduled bus in Sweden in 1927, when she started driving the Kappelshamn–Visby route. She initially drove a Chevrolet bus which could accommodate 14 passengers. The speed limit was 20 kilometres per hour. In 1931, the speed limit changed to 30 kilometres per hour, and Persson purchased a Volvo bus. On Gotland, Persson became known by the nickname "Buss-Berta". During the seven years of driving the route, Persson also bore her eighth child. A neighbour supported her with childcare.

== Later life ==
In 1934, Gotland railway took over the bus service and Persson retired from bus driving. The Perssons and their seven children then rented a large house, and Berta started a guest house business. She became known for her cooking, and was often hired to cater weddings and other large celebrations.

In 1948, the Perssons moved to Bunge, where Berta was involved in the Swedish Women's Association for the Defence of the Fatherland (known as the Lottakårer). She worked with the Red Cross and the Fårösunds Husmodersförening (a countrywomen's institute) board for a number of years.

Berta Persson died on 9 December 1961, aged 68.

In 2022, a grant was awarded by the Swedish Film Institute to develop a film about Persson's life.
