= Fleringe =

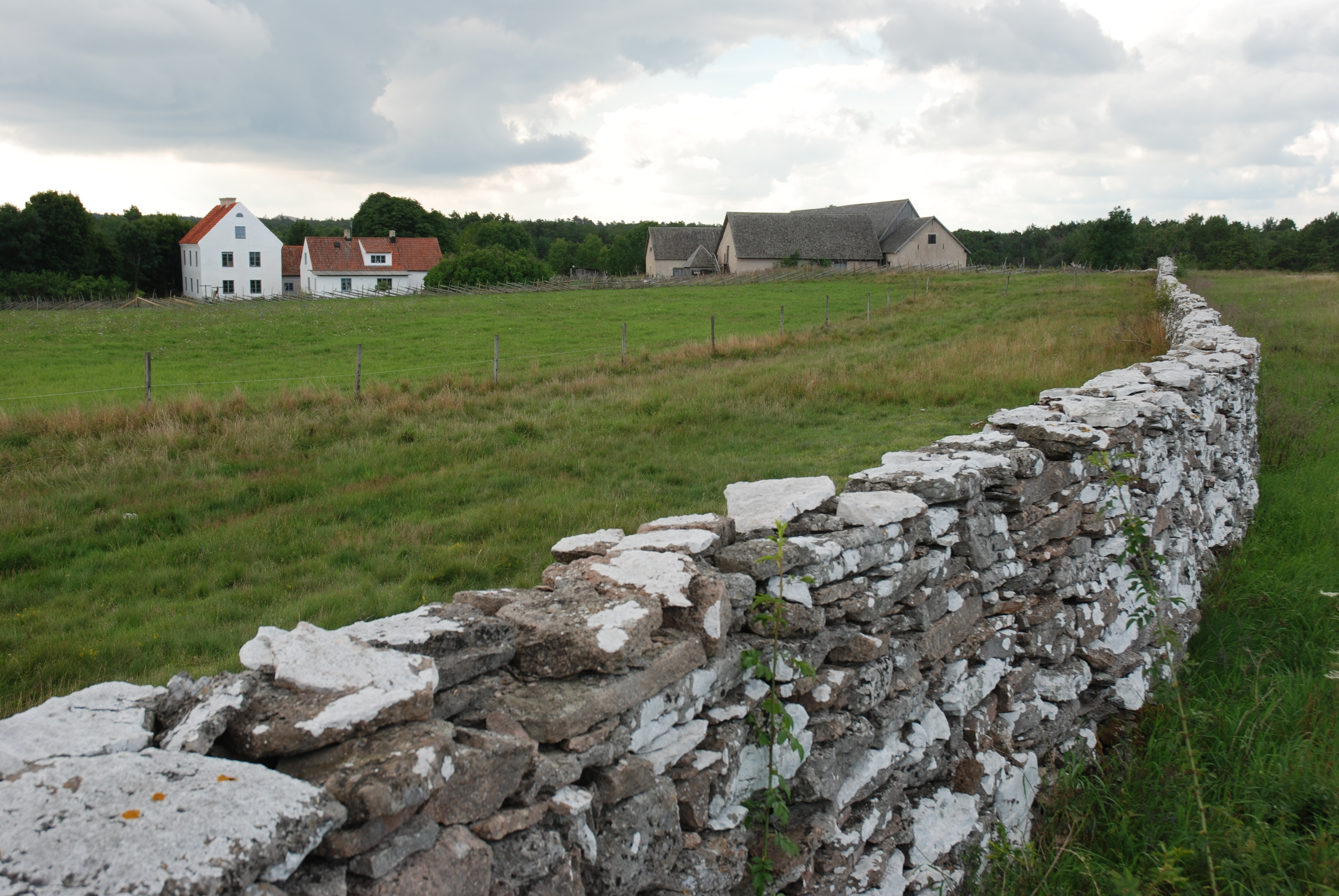
- West part of Hau farm in Fleringe

- Location within Gotland
- Coordinates: 57°52′10.66″N 18°52′37.07″E
- Country: Sweden
- Province: Gotland
- County: Gotland County
- Municipality: Gotland Municipality

Area _60.06 km2 is land
  - Total: 69 km^{2} (27 sq mi)

Population (2014)
  - Total: 74
- Time zone: UTC+1 (CET)
  - Summer (DST): UTC+2 (CEST)

Fleringe is a populated area, a socken (not to be confused with parish), on the Swedish island of Gotland. It comprises the same area as the administrative Fleringe District, established on 1 January 2016.

== Community ==
The name is known since 1304 as Fledynge, the first part flaidh meaning "tear or wound" is figuratively used for "hills" or "wound in the landscape", such "wounds" can be found north and northwest of the church, and the last part inge meaning "inhabitants". Fleringe is situated on the north coast of the main island, Gotland, west of Fårösund and right by Lake Bästeträsk. Fleringe is mostly forested land.

A number of grave mounds and stone circles from the bronze age can be found at Fleringe. The medieval Fleringe Church is located in Fleringe. As of 2019, Fleringe Church belongs to Bunge-Rute-Fleringe parish in Norra Gotlands pastorat, along with the churches in Bunge and Rute .

One of the asteroids in the Asteroid belt, 9359 Fleringe, is named after this place.

== Limestone industry ==
From 1650, and peaking during the 1920s, the area around Fleringe contained many industries connected to the limestone industry on Gotland. The limestone industry closed down in 1990. The old lime kiln can still be seen as a part of Bläse lime industry museum along with the old railway. One of the old limestone quarries at Ar in north Fleringe is now filled with water so clear and blue it has been named the Blue Lagoon. It is a popular destination for people on the island.

== Lakes and research ==
The Lake Bästeträsk is the largest lake on Gotland. The water is very clear and shallow, with an average depth of 4.5 m (15 ft).

The long, flat stone beaches at Ar in north Fleringe makes this an ideal location for weather and fishing research. There are two research stations at Ar, Fårösund väderstation and Fiskforskningsstationen connected to Campus Gotland and Uppsala University. Sometimes these stations also hosts ornithological research.

== Gallery ==
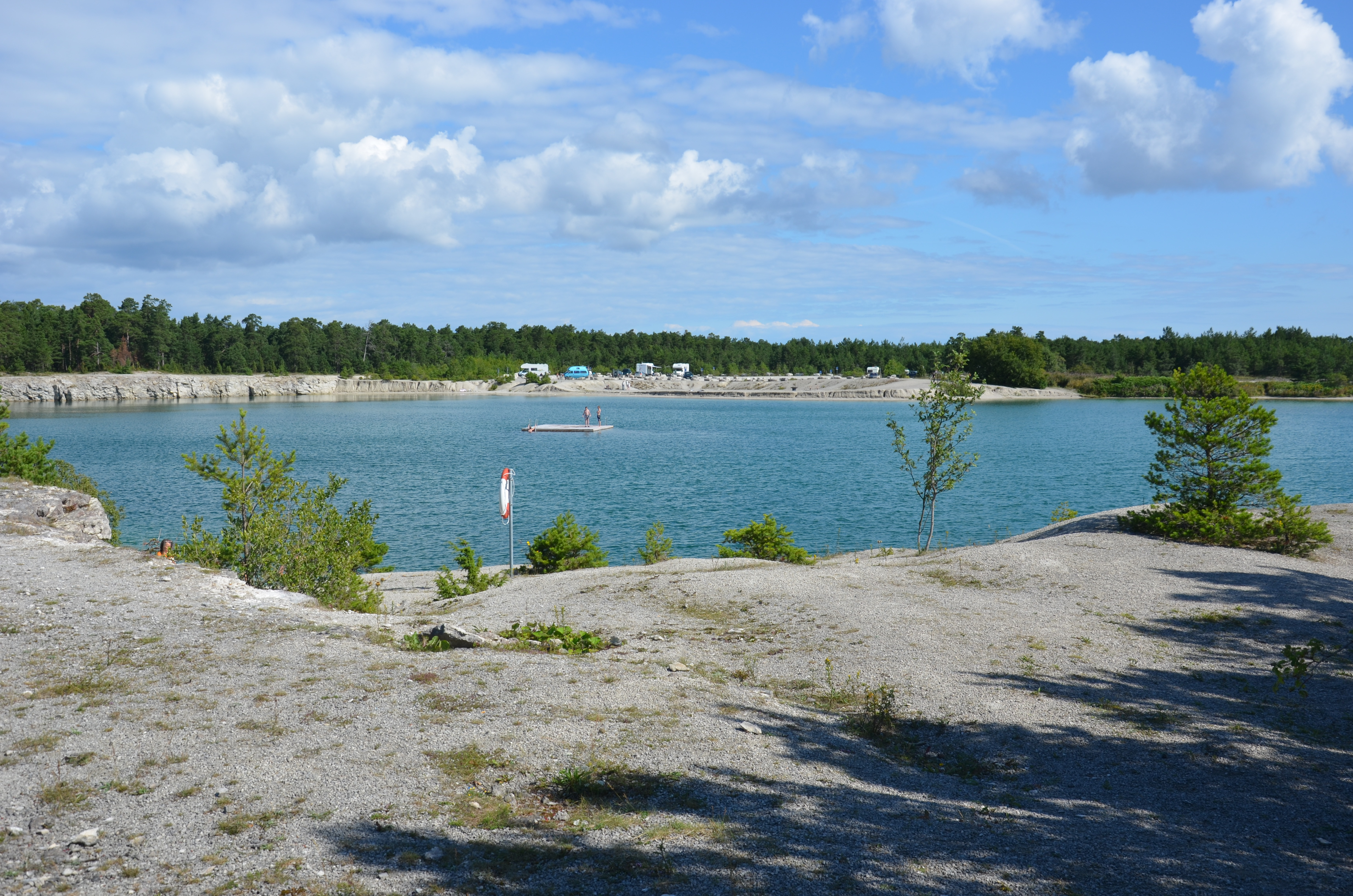
The Blue Lagoon at Ar, Fleringe.

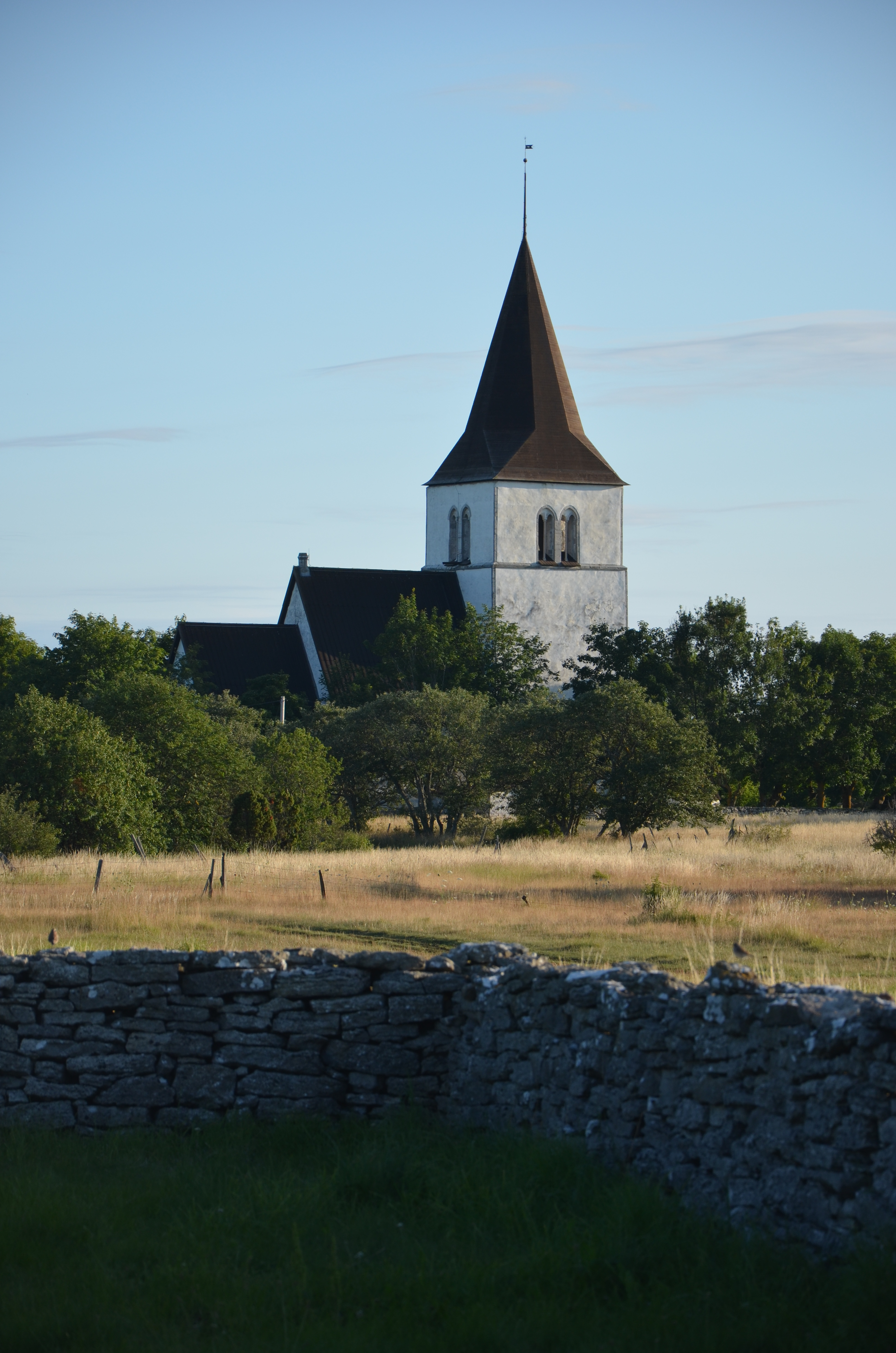
Fleringe church.

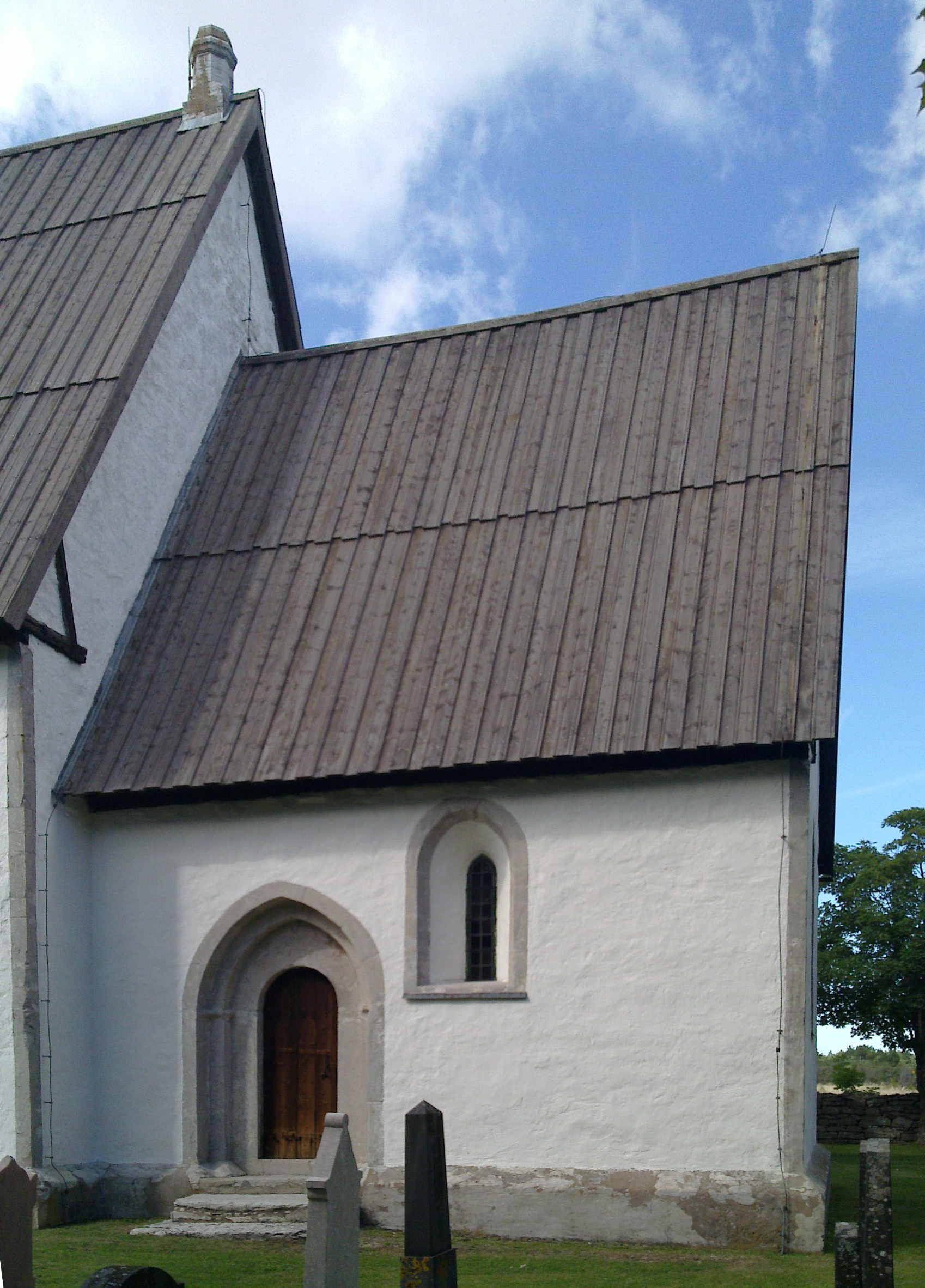
Flerlinge church.

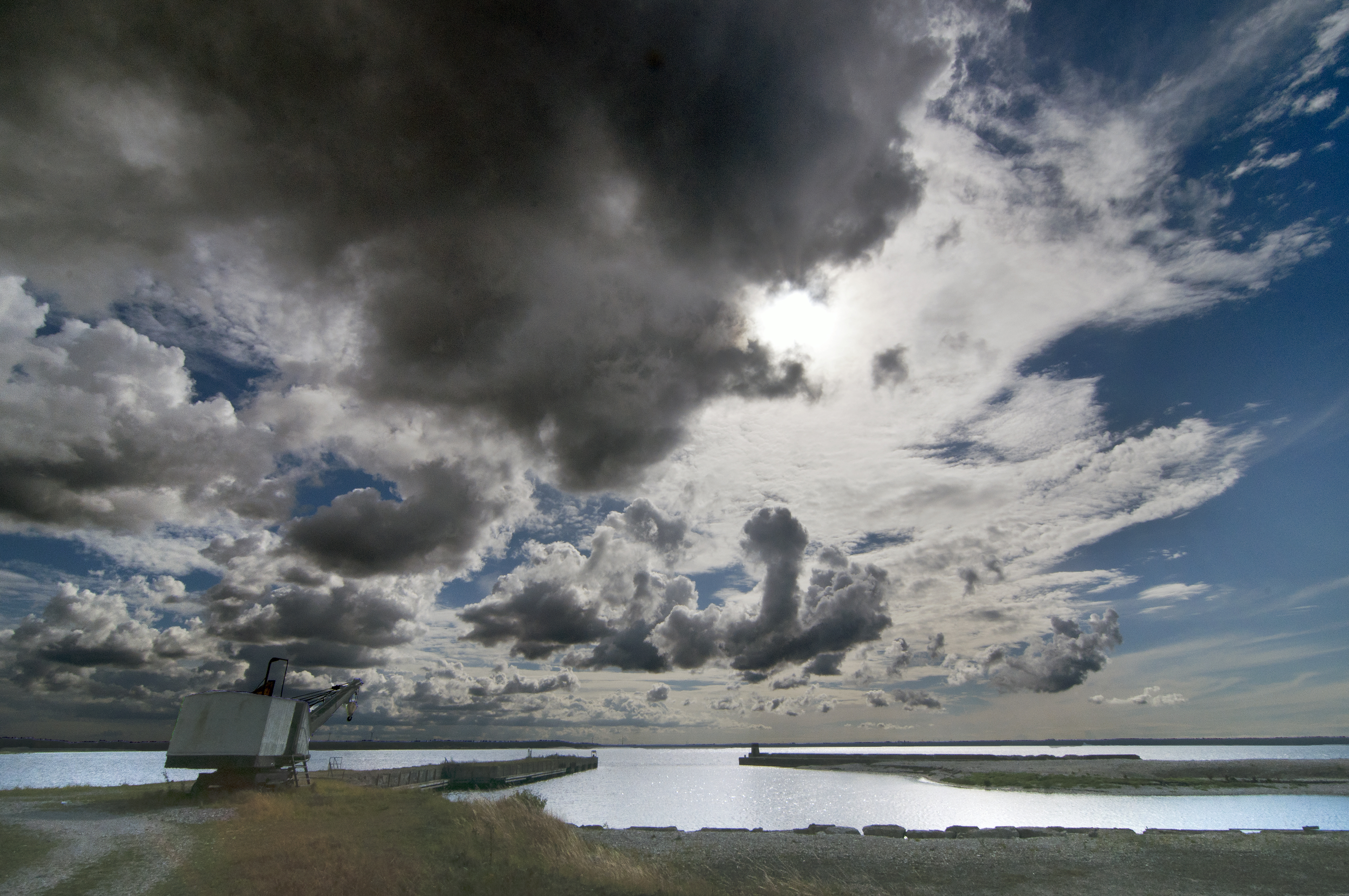
Bläse harbor, Fleringe.

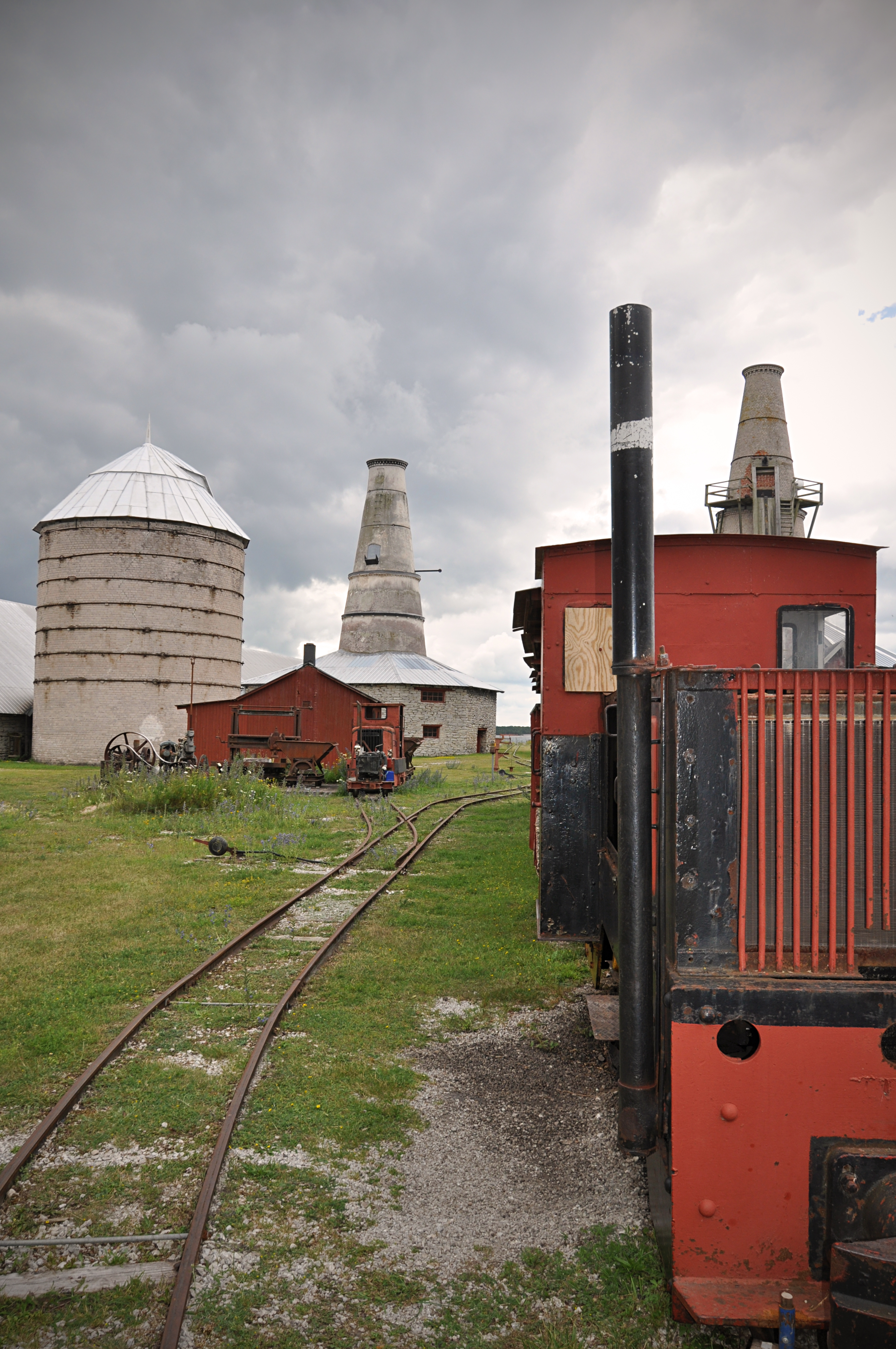
Bläse limestone industry museum, Fleringe.

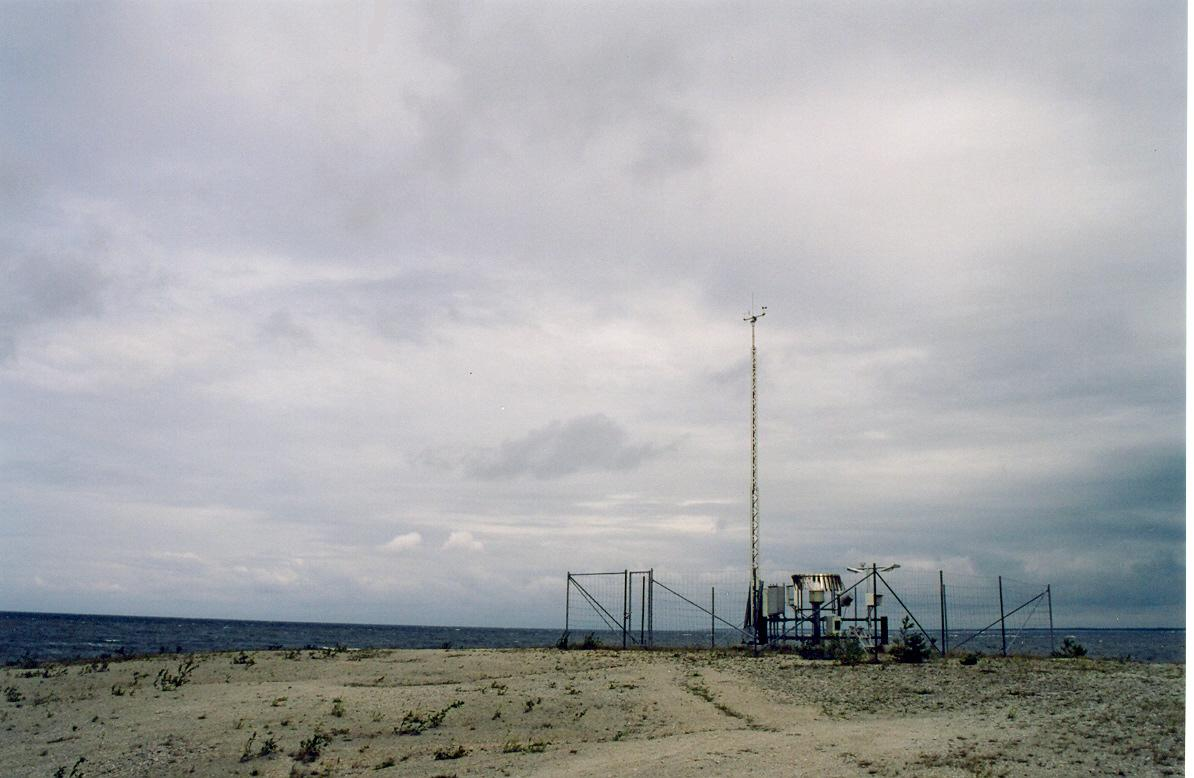
Weather station at Ar, Fleringe.

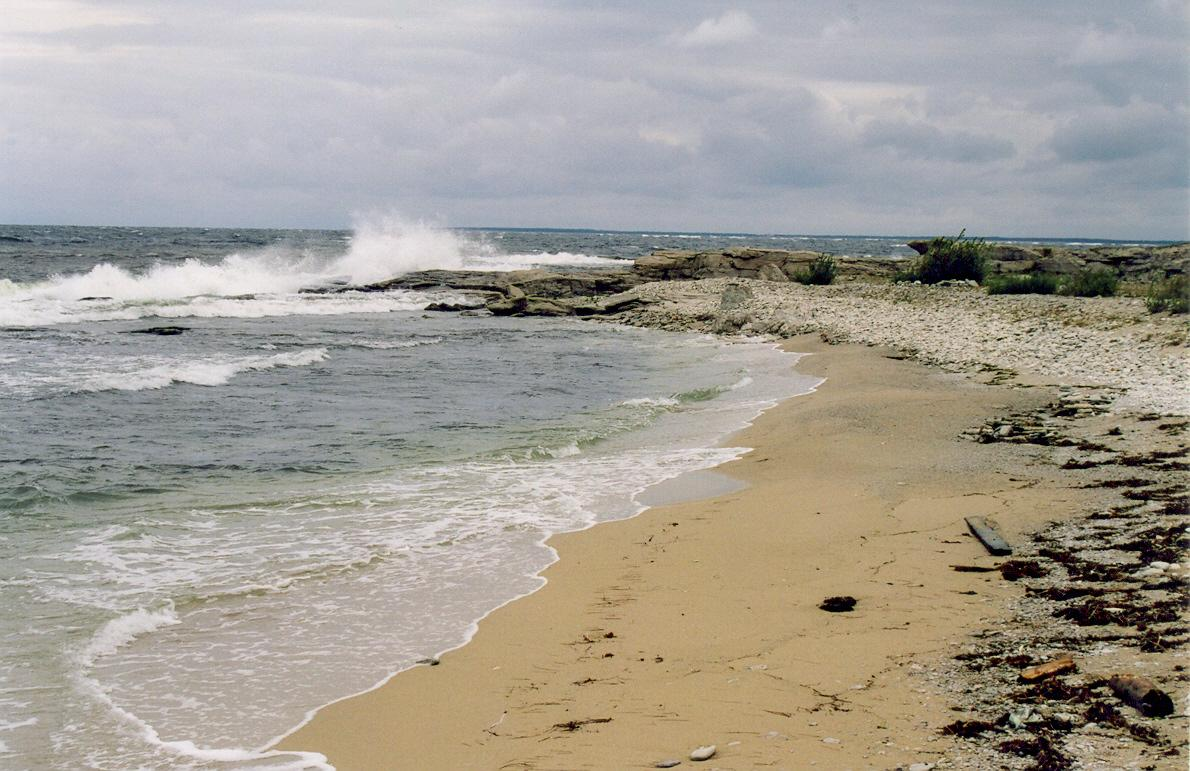
Stranden vid Ar, Fleringe.

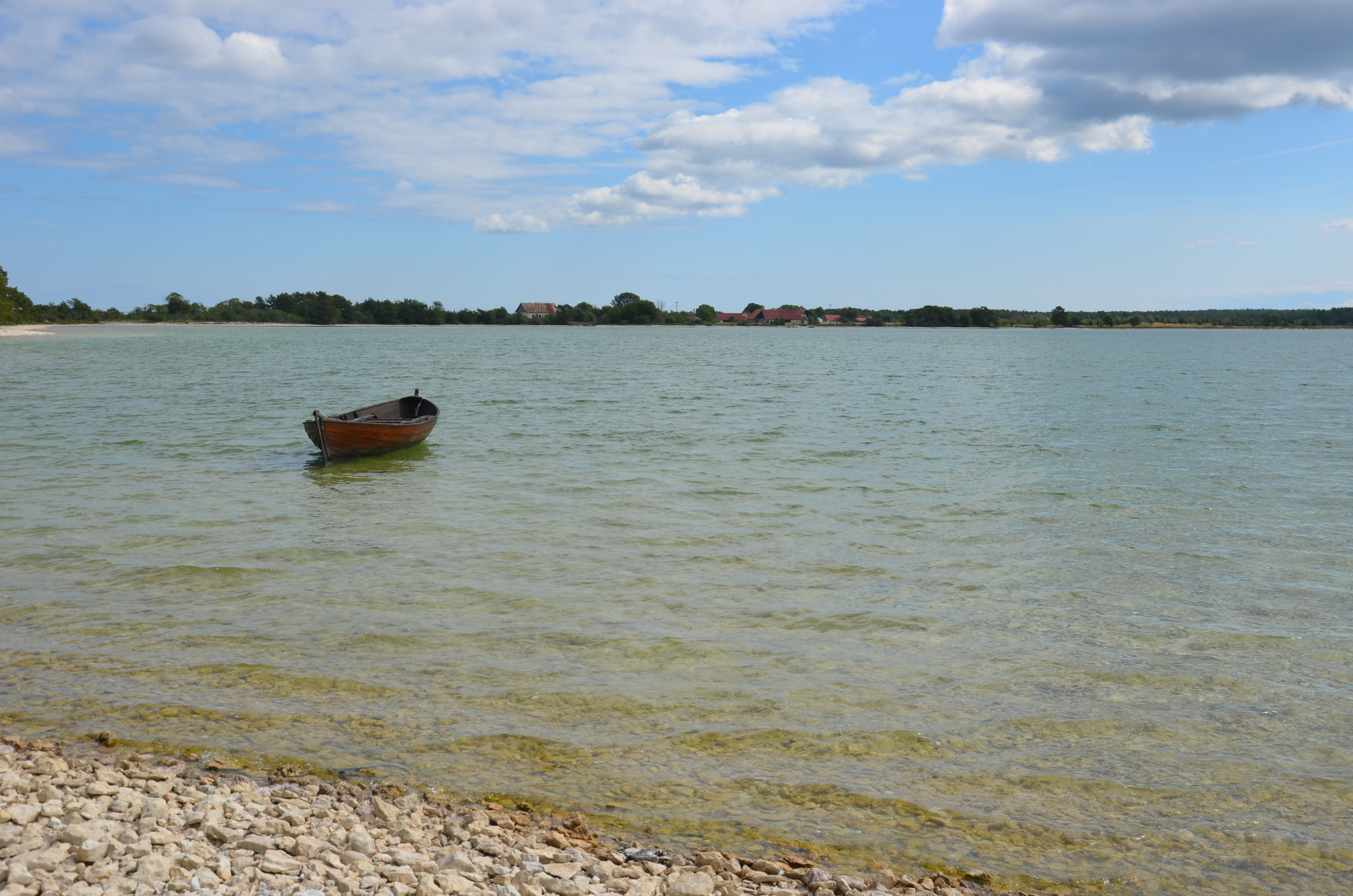
Bästeträsk at Fleringe.
