= Lotten von Plomgren =

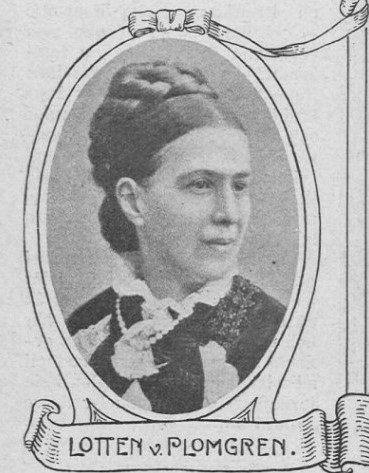
- Born: Charlotta Johanna Jakobina Liljencrantz; 13 October 1831; Östermalm, Stockholm
- Died: 20 July 1916 (aged 84)
- Known for: Chairman of Swedish Women's Association for the Defence of the Fatherland

Charlotta (Lotten) Johanna Jakobina von Plomgren (13 October 1831 – 20 July 1916), was a Swedish activist for civil defence. She was one of the founders of Swedish Women's Association for the Defence of the Fatherland and was its president from its foundation in 1884 until 1914.

== Early life and marriage ==
Charlotta Liljencrantz was born on 13 October 1831 in the headquarters of the cavalry unit Life Guards of Horse, Östermalm, Stockholm, where her father, Count Gustaf Fredrik Liljencrantz, was second in command. Her mother was Johanna Josefina Eleonora Stjernstedt. She was the second child in a family that would grow to five and was known as Lotten. Her youngest sister Jaquette Liljencrantz, would later run away to free herself from the harsh social control of her brothers and became a journalist in Copenhagen in Denmark. Lotten Liljencrantz's childhood was spent in Stockholm, partly in the Arvfursten Palace, after her father was appointed Marshal of the Court to King Oscar I in the 1840s.

At the age of 25, she married a military officer, Erland von Plomgren, who was later promoted to the rank of colonel. They had eight children together, born in close succession between 1857 and 1870. The youngest daughter, Ida von Plomgren, became a women's rights activist and Swedish fencing champion.

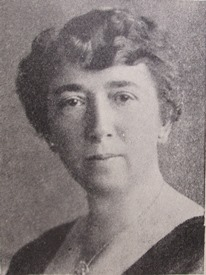
Ida von Plomgren

== Swedish Women's Association for the Defence of the Fatherland ==
In the spring of 1884, von Plomgren took part in a meeting of women advocating rearmament, which resulted in the formation of the organisation Swedish Women's Association for the Defence of the Fatherland. The purpose of the association was to support the nation's military defence and it raised large sums of money for military purposes, including the strengthening of Karlsborg Fortress. von Plomgren was chairman of the association for 30 years from its formation in 1884 until 1914, during which time it grew into one of Sweden's largest women's organisations. Lotten von Plomgren was an effective and energetic leader, successfully developing the organisation during her long tenure as chairman. She was awarded the Illis quorum medal, among other honours in recognition of this work.

== Later life ==
von Plomgren resigned from the board of the Swedish Women's Association for the Defence of the Fatherland in 1914 due to age and ill health. She was succeeded as chairman by Anna Rappe.

Lotten von Plomgren died in 1916, aged 84.
