= Swedish Women's Association for the Defence of the Fatherland =

Swedish women's organisation in support of military

The Swedish Women's Association for the Defence of the Fatherland (Swedish: Svenska kvinnoföreningen för fosterlandets försvar or Svenska Quinnoföreningen för fosterlandets försvar), was founded in Stockholm on 9 April 1884. The association's founders wanted to promote patriotism, a desire for Swedish national defence, and raise money for various defence purposes.

== Organisational aims and ambitions ==
The association's first undertaking was to raise money to purchase land surrounding Karlsborg Fortress to strengthen its defences. The provision of weapons and ammunition sponsored young people who were members of volunteer shooting clubs. The organisation also supported the Swedish Landstorm, a militia and territorial defence force created in Sweden in 1885.

The association gave lectures, distributed patriotic and pro-defence literature, and organised lotteries, bazaars, defence parties and similar events.

== Membership ==
It was founded by a group of women, including Lotten von Plomgren, its president from 1884 to 1914, and Augusta Wästfelt, its secretary from 1884 to 1920. Berta Persson, Sweden's first woman bus driver, was a member.

== Dissolution ==
The association was dissolved in 1970, and a fund was established from its remaining assets, which are administered by the Svenska lottakåren, the Swedish Women's Voluntary Defence Organization. The fund supports prizes in connection with shooting competitions. The prizes must be engraved with ‘Svenska Kvinnoföreningen för Fosterlandets Försvar, Hederspris’.
