= Fleringe Church =

- Fleringe kyrka
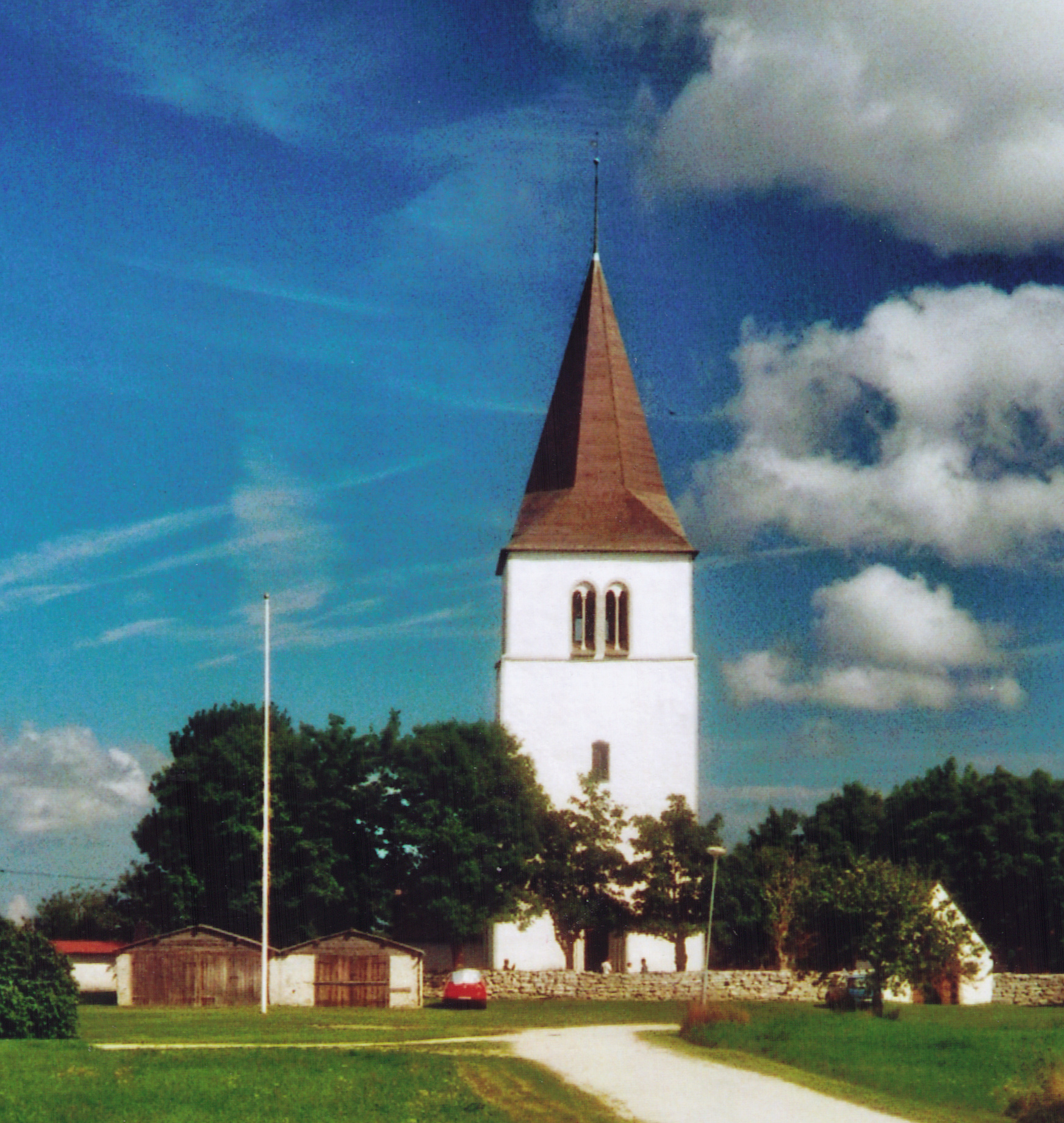
- Fleringe Church, view with the church stables and the medieval lychgate visible

- Location on Gotland
- 57°52′11″N 18°52′37″E
- Country: Sweden
- Denomination: Church of Sweden

Administration
- Diocese: Visby

Fleringe Church (Swedish: Fleringe kyrka) is a medieval church in Fleringe on the Swedish island of Gotland. Although heavily damaged by fire in 1676, medieval mural fragments survive in the church, which also still has its medieval lychgate and preserved church stables. The church is associated with the Diocese of Visby of the Church of Sweden.

== History and architecture ==
Fleringe Church is built of limestone and dates from the 13th century. The nave and choir are the oldest parts. Somewhat later during the same century the tower was added. The church has not been substantially altered since, but suffered damage in a heavy fire in 1676.

The church is located in a cemetery surrounded by a low wall in which a remaining medieval lychgate still sits. Outside, the church stables still stand, which is uncommon. The façade of the church itself has decorated Gothic portals. Of these, the one in the tower is the most richly decorated.

Inside, nothing remains of the medieval furnishings as they were destroyed in the 1676 fire. The main supporting pillar has a base taken from another, ruined, medieval church (in Gann, Gotland). This was probably done because the former base likewise had been damaged by fire. A few fragments of murals also survive, probably executed by the Master of the Passion of Christ (Passionsmästaren). The walls also have ornamental decoration from the late 16th century. The altarpiece is from 1701, the pulpit from 1726 and the pews also from the 18th century. The baptismal font carries the monogram of Christian IV of Denmark and originally belonged to the church of Visborg Castle.
