= Bunge Church =

- Bunge kyrka
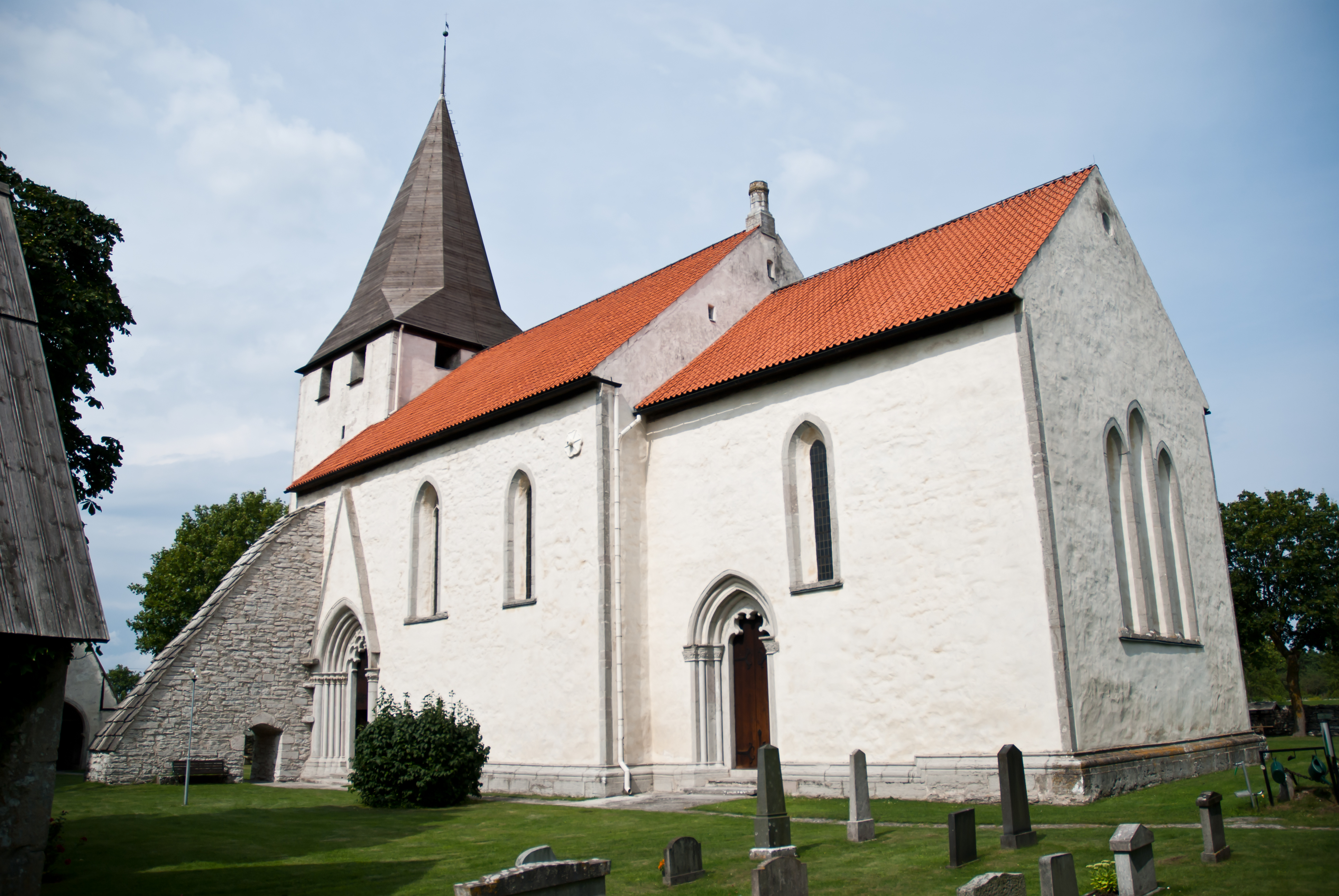
- Bunge Church, view of the exterior

- Location on Gotland
- 57°51′13″N 19°01′25″E
- Location: Bunge
- Country: Sweden
- Denomination: Church of Sweden

Administration
- Diocese: Visby

Bunge Church (Swedish: Bunge kyrka) is a medieval church in Bunge on the Swedish island of Gotland. The church seen today was largely built during the 14th century and is in a High Gothic style typical for churches on Gotland. Inside, the church is richly decorated with medieval murals, including depictions of medieval knights whose significance remain contested. Bunge Church belongs to the Church of Sweden and lies in the Diocese of Visby (Sweden).

== History ==
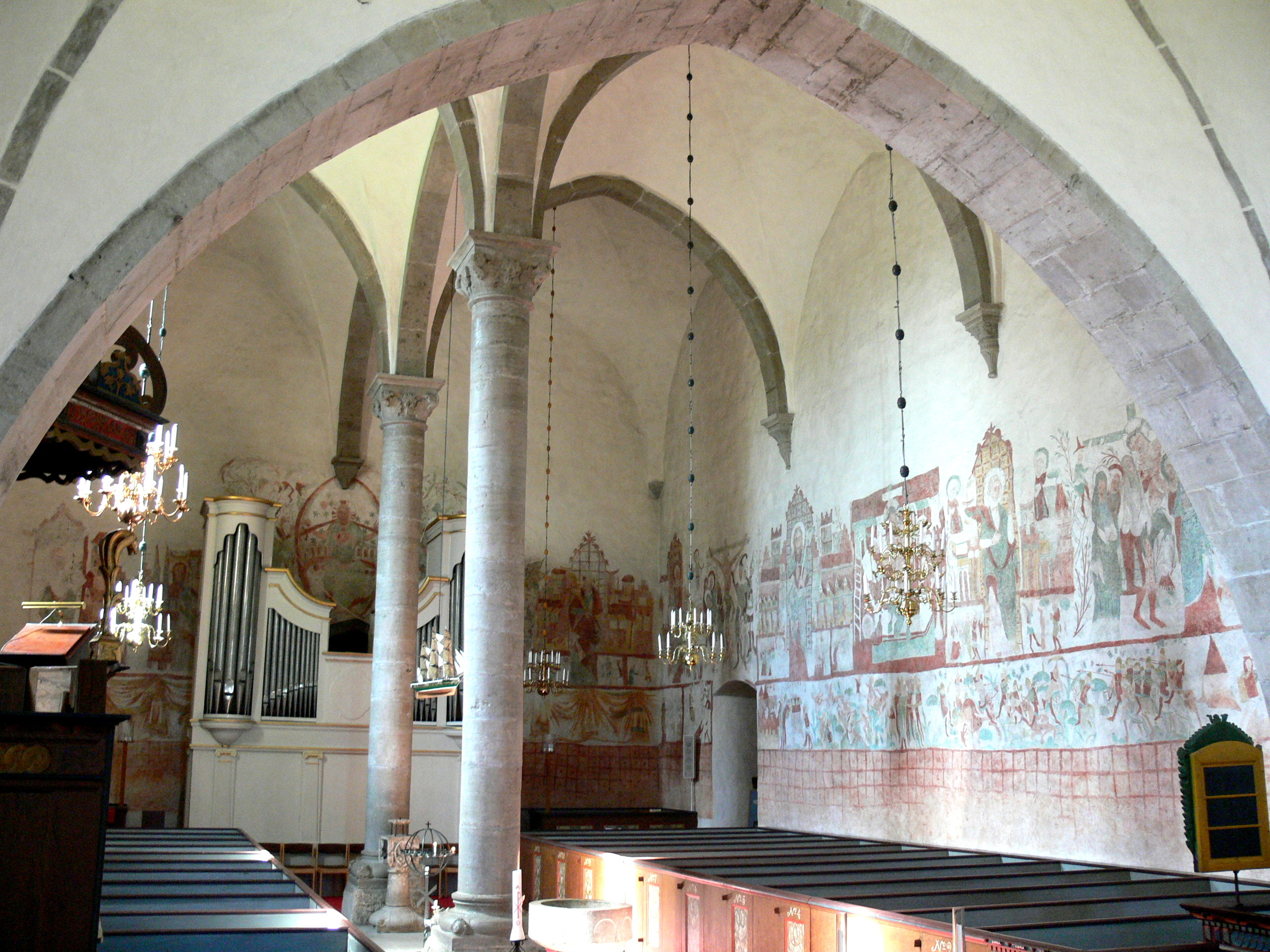
View of the nave from the choir

Archaeological excavations carried out in 1916 and 1971 have shown that the present, mainly Gothic church was pre-dated by a Romanesque church, dating from the 12th century. The massive, fortress-like tower of the church is somewhat later but belonged to this first edifice. The nave and choir were built in the 14th century in a form of High Gothic typical for Gotland: the nave is high and spacious, divided into two by slender columns; the choir lacks an apse; and the east end of the church instead finishes in a straight wall adorned with three slender windows.

The church and churchyard are surrounded by a wall which originally reached much higher and had a defensive purpose. Four medieval gates still survive in the wall. The church complex evidently has fulfilled a defensive role, as there are marks from pikes and crossbow bolts in the sturdy tower-door, still preserved in its original place. In addition, the inside of the church is profusely decorated with murals depicting, among other things, fighting knights. The murals and the church wall may date from the short period in history when Gotland belonged to the Teutonic Order. This has led some scholars to speculate whether the church for a time might have been owned by the crusading Order, and turned into an Ordensburg (albeit on a small scale).

The church today belongs to the Church of Sweden and lies within the Diocese of Visby.

== Architecture ==
The church is one of the largest on northern Gotland. As mentioned, it displays a mix between Romanesque (the tower) and Gothic (the nave and choir). The church has a southern portal, rich in sculpture, and a northern portal with Romanesque details, possibly partially incorporated from the earlier church building.

The most distinguishing feature of the interior is no doubt the richly painted walls, with murals executed by a master painter probably from Prussia or Bohemia. These are from the late 14th century or early 15th and depict different Christian themes, like the Last Judgement, the crucifixion, a few of the apostles but also the Mass of Saint Gregory and legends of saints. As for the previously mentioned depicted knights, scholars have different views of what they may depict or represent. One theory is that they are Teutonic knights. Another claims that they represent a depiction of the Battle of Visby, while others believe they are, in line with the other paintings, representing the Christian theme of the martyrdom of the Theban Legion. A single remaining stained glass window remains, a baptismal font from the 13th century and an oddity: a mite box in stone, which is signed by the stonemason in runes, Lafrans made this stone.
