= Janken Wiel-Hansen =

Norwegian-Swedish athlete and feminist

- Born: Johanne Sofie Wiel-Hansen; 11 July 1868; Fredrikshald
- Died: 3 April 1938 (aged 69); Stockholm
- Resting place: Norra begravningsplatsen
- Known for: Athlete, pioneer in fencing and swordsmanship, ‘D’Artagnan of Stockholm and Sweden.’

Johanne Sofie "Janken" Wiel-Hansen (11 July 1868 - 3 April 1938) was a Norwegian-Swedish athlete, feminist and a pioneer in fencing and swordsmanship. She was the founder of the Stockholms Kvinnliga Fäktklubb (Stockholm Women's Fencing Club) and known as the ‘D’Artagnan of Stockholm and Sweden.’

== Early life ==
Johanne Sofie Wiel-Hansen was born on 11 July 1868 to Julie and Wilhelm Hansen, in the Norwegian town of Fredrikshald (now known as Halden), on the border with Sweden. An industrial border town, it had many international trading contacts. Her father belonged to one of the town's wealthy patrician families, who were involved in shipping and trading in timber products. He had trained as a forester in Aschaffenburg, Bavaria where he met and married Juliane Catharina Josepha (Julie) Steigerwald. The couple moved to Fredrikshald. Johanne Sofie had two younger siblings, Anni and Wilhelm. During her childhood, the family moved several times between Norway and Sweden, eventually settling in Stockholm where her father died early in 1886, when she was in her early twenties.

== Career ==
Less than a year after her father's death, Janken Wiel-Hansen had found employment at P.A. Norstedt & Sons, Sweden's oldest publishing house. She was one of the first women to work for the company, and worked there for 25 years as a clerk and cash sales manager, and was later remembered as "vital, very humorous". Both her younger siblings also found work at the publishing house within a few years.

Wiel-Hansen changed her name to Janken Wiel-Hansen sometime in the early 1900s, and was referred to by Janken in the Swedish media in the spring of 1906. In 1905, she applied for Swedish citizenship.

== Fencing ==
Janken Wiel-Hansen was reported to have inherited her interest in sport from her father. In addition to fencing, she enjoyed cycling, gymnastics, horse riding, rowing, sailing, skiing and skating. At the age of 30, Janken Wiel-Hansen first encountered fencing, which she believed was the ultimate sport for women. She took her first fencing lessons in 1903 from the French fencing master Eugène Filiol, who ran a salle d'armes on Sturegatan street in Stockholm. In the summers of 1904 and 1905 she studied fencing in England and France. In 1906 she took part in the international fencing competitions in Tourcoing winning first prize, and became an international champion, which made an impression on the press at home. In Sweden, fencing had until then been an exclusively male sport, primarily for officers. But in Europe, especially in England, fencing had many female practitioners. Filiol was the one who introduced modern fencing to Sweden and also taught women, which was something completely new. In the summers of 1904 and 1905, Janken Wiel-Hansen trained in fencing at various schools in London and Paris.

In 1905, she founded the Stockholms Kvinnliga Fäktklubb (Stockholm Women's Fencing Club), where she remained a leader for the rest of her life. The club was one of Stockholm's first sports clubs for women. Wiel-Hansen's strong arguments about the benefits of fencing, and her international success in the field, contributed to the sport gaining acceptance as a suitable sport for women. It was seen by contemporaries as having grace, calmness and an aesthetic value, although the press and male fencing clubs took a somewhat cavalier attitude to women's fencing. In 1929, Wiel-Hansen and two men were awarded the Swedish Fencing Federation's highest honour, a gold shield, the first time the honour was awarded.

In addition to fencing, social activities were an important part of the Stockholms Kvinnliga Fäktklubb. Parlour rooms were set up alongside the fencing rooms. Tea parties, soirees and theatre performances were part of the club's programme. Both working people and housewives met here to relax, although many members came from the upper classes of society. Crown Princess Margareta, who was interested in sport, was an honorary member.

Severe rheumatism meant that Wiel-Hansen had to retire from working life at just over 40 years of age. Despite this, her involvement in the fencing club continued. During good periods, she was able to fence and she continued to instruct. At times this had to be done from a wheelchair. The Stockholm Women's Fencing Club closed shortly after Wiel-Hansen's death, and became part of the larger, male organisation Föreningen för Fäktkonstens Främjande.

Wiel-Hansen enjoyed performing on stage and was a regular actor, not only in the fencing club's productions but also in theatre productions of the Nya Idun Society, of which she was a member. She often played male roles. Wiel-Hansen's surviving photo albums contain pictures of her posing as a fencer, as Napoleon and as a Bavarian youth in Tyrolean costume with a pipe in her mouth. These plays were written by Janken Wiel-Hansen's life partner, Ida von Plomgren, also a successful fencer. Ida von Plomgren was active in feminist circles and employed by the Fredrika Bremer Association. Wiel-Hansen was also a member of the association.

== Personal life ==
Ida von Plomgren and Wiel-Hansen shared a house and lived at the same address for at least the last 15 years of the latter's life. They travelled together on several occasions, including to Bavaria and Norway. Shortly before her death in 1938, Janken Wiel-Hansen made a will in which Plomgren was the sole beneficiary.

Janken Wiel-Hansen attracted attention on the streets of Stockholm. Sculptor Carl Milles portrayed her in the sculpture Skrattet (Laughter) in 1909, which is on display at Millesgården on Lidingö. From an early age, she attracted attention figure skating on the ice around the city in winter. Sport helped Janken Wiel-Hansen to find her style. She was a regular cyclist and dressed in sports skirts and blouses. In the early years of the 20th century, her ‘manly short-cropped head’ caused comment. She preferred a practical grey walking suit, which she had made in the same style year after year. For parties, she wore a black suit or a man's jacket with a long skirt. She maintained her style and dress until her death.

Janken Wiel-Hansen died on 3 April 1938. She is buried at Norra begravningsplatsen in Solna.

== Legacy ==
In 2019, a suitcase labelled "W-H. resgods Stockholm" was found in the stores of Østfold Museums, as part of a move and redocumentation of collections from the fortress in Halden to more modern storage facilities. Inside, there were photographs, a wallet, a pastille, cigarette and powder boxes, a clock, a rosary and a cross, a photograph album that was also a music box, fencing medals from 1917, and a medal from the 1924 Paris Olympics. Museum staff researched the suitcase's contents and connected it to Weil-Hansen, tracking its journey from Ida von Pomgren's posthumous donation to a Swedish museum. They used it to create Janken - The Fencing Lady, an exhibition, film and learning resources about Wiel-Hansen's life in the newly opened Halden Museum.
