= Ida von Plomgren =

Swedish fencer (1870–1960)

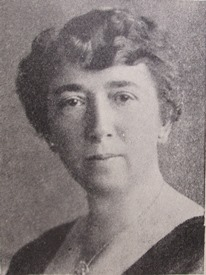
- Born: Ida Amalia von Plomgren; 9 September 1870; Södermanland County, Sweden
- Died: 26 March 1960 (aged 89); Stockholm, Sweden
- Occupations: fencer, secretary, suffragist
- Known for: Swedish feminist, women's foil fencing champion
- Parent(s): Erland von Plomgren; Baroness Lottie Liljencrantz
- Relatives: Jaquette Liljencrantz (aunt)

Ida Amalia von Plomgren (9 September 1870 – 26 March 1960) was a Swedish feminist, writer and administrator, and one of the first Swedish women's foil fencing champions. She was best known to friends by her nickname "Plom".

== Early life ==
Ida Amalia von Plomgren was born on 9 September 1870 in the Måstena manor house in Södermanland County, Sweden, owned by her paternal von Plomgren family since 1755. She was the youngest daughter of Baroness Lotten von Plomgren (née Liljencrantz) and Colonel Erland von Plomgren. Her maternal aunt was Jaquette Liljencrantz, a Swedish born Danish writer, journalist, women's rights activist and socialist.

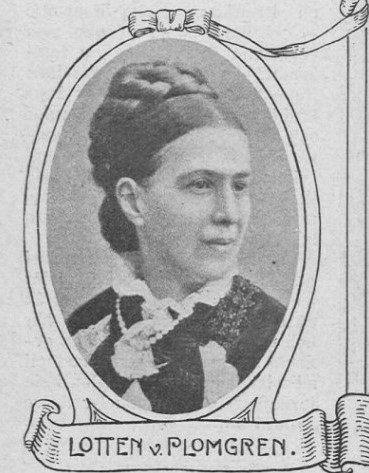
Lotten von Plomgren

== Career ==
Ida von Plomgren was employed at the Fredrika Bremer Association's office in 1900. Often abbreviated to the FBF, it is the oldest women's rights organisation in Sweden, founded in 1884. Plomgren worked there throughout her career, including as secretary from 1916 to 1937. She later became head of the FBF's vocational counselling office. She was a member of the board from 1917 to 1942 and chairman of the Stockholm branch from 1931 to 1938. In 1934, Plomgren fronted a publicity film about the FBF, scripted by Margareta von Konow. Plomgren narrated how far the fight for women's rights had come and sharing some of the organisation's areas of activity. This included a visit to the FBF office at Klarabergsgatan 48, where Plomgren joked that her door sign should read ‘Ask me about everything - because that's what the Swedish people do’.

Plomgren was elected to the Nya Idun Society in 1907. She was the society's secretary from 1918 to 1921 and then its president from 1921 to 1935.

In her spare time, Plomgren was also involved in a number of organisations. She was active in the Stockholm Women's Fencing Club, founded in 1905 by Janken Wiel-Hansen. Plomgren was secretary of the club from its founding in 1905 until 1923 and was then vice-president from 1923 to 1938. She became the Swedish champion in foil fencing in 1909, one of the first women in Sweden to reach this standard in the sport. She was also chairman of the Stockholm Lyceum Club 1921–1927, a member of the board of the agricultural college at Rimforsa 1922–1936, and secretary and treasurer of the Vaksamhet association from 1927.

Plomgren wrote articles in newspapers and magazines, including the feminist Hertha magazine. She wrote several plays for Nya Idun in collaboration with Annie Bergman, including a Mozart parody Figges bröllop in 1933 and Den gudomliga äppelkompotten in 1935 as part of the organisation's 50th anniversary. She also wrote plays for the Stockholm Women's Fencing Club. Wiel-Hansen acted in several of the plays Plomgren wrote, both for the Stockholm Women's Fencing Club and in Nya Idun.

== Recognition ==
Plomgren was awarded the Illis quorum of the eighth magnitude in 1934 and the Gold Medal of the Swedish Royal Patriotic Society in 1941.

== Personal life ==
Ida von Plomgren and Janken Wiel-Hansen shared a home and lived at the same address for at least the last 15 years before Wiel-Hansen's death in 1938. The couple travelled together several times, including to Bavaria and Norway. Plomgren was the sole beneficiary of Janken Wiel-Hansen's will, made shortly before her death. Plomgren survived her by 20 years.

Ida von Plomgren died in Stockholm on 6 March 1960.
