= Bus driver =

Person who drives a bus

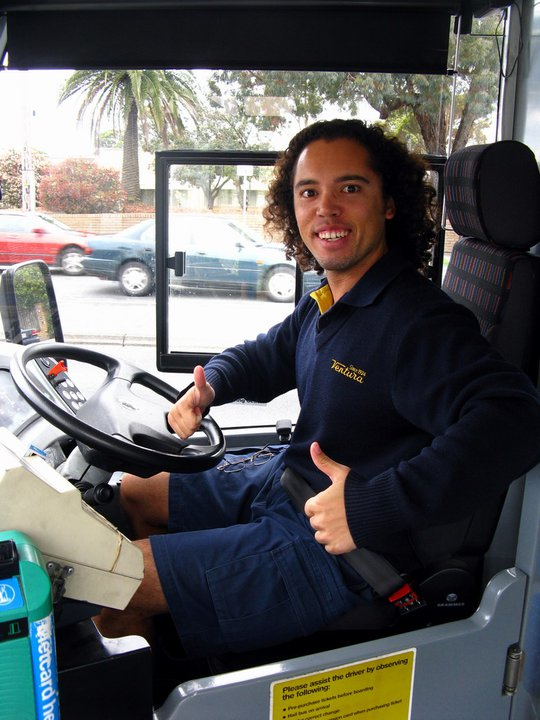
A bus driver for Ventura Bus Lines in Melbourne, Australia

A bus driver, bus operator, or bus captain is a person who drives buses for a living.

== Description ==
Bus drivers must have a special license above and beyond a regular driver's license. Bus drivers typically drive their vehicles between bus stations or stops. Bus drivers often drop off and pick up passengers on a predetermined route schedule. In British English a different term, coach driver, is used for drivers on privately booked long-distance routes, tours, and school trips.

There are various types of bus drivers, including transit drivers, school bus drivers, intercity bus drivers, and tour bus drivers. Bus drivers may work for a city, public (state and national/federal) governments, school systems, and/or private enterprises, such as charter companies that run tour buses or arrange travel between cities for private groups. Bus drivers in Australia (referred to as "coach captains") are frequently freelance sub-contractors who work for various bus and coach companies.

When there is no conductor present, the driver is the sole operator and handles ticketing and interaction with customers, in addition to driving.

== Training ==
Requirements vary by country, but in general bus drivers are required to undergo more training than individuals driving a passenger automobile. For example, in the United States, all bus drivers are required to hold a Commercial Driver's License (CDL) with P endorsement. Safe driving skills and the willingness to obey traffic laws and handle driving under a variety of weather and traffic conditions are essential, as passengers expect a safe trip, and the safety of those in other vehicles on the road is necessary.

New hires by companies are often oriented to their jobs by first riding along for one or more runs on a route, then driving the route under supervision of an experienced driver, or driving the route unsupervised without any passengers. After passing the training, most new hires will only work as backups until a permanent position can be offered.

== Intercity bus driver ==
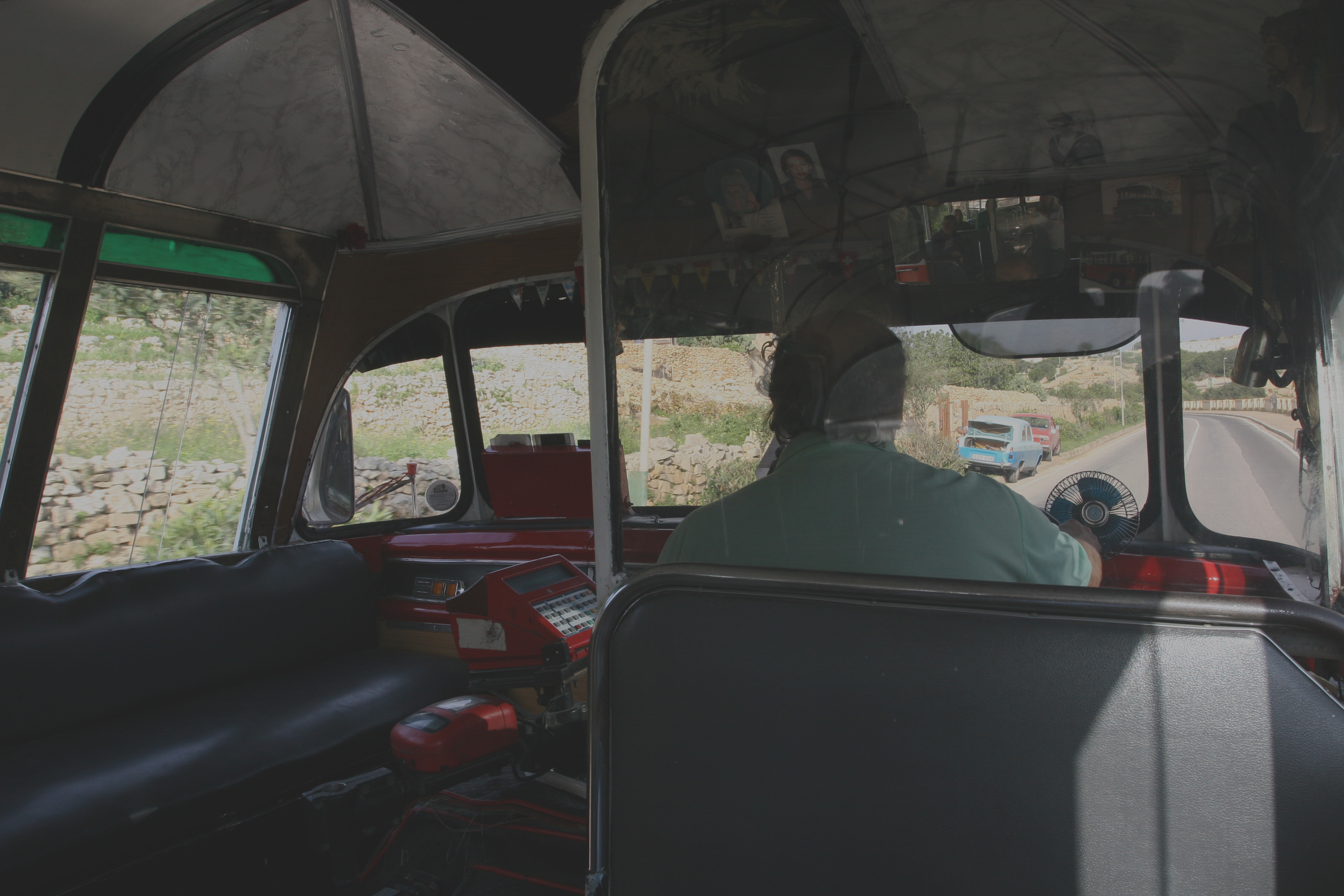
An intercity bus driver driving a bus

An intercity bus driver is a bus driver whose duties involve driving a bus between cities. It is one of four common positions available to those capable of driving buses (the others being school, transit, or tour bus driving). Those hired as intercity bus are often expected to have prior experience in the operation of a commercial vehicle. This may include the operation of a municipal bus service, school buses, or trucks. Intercity bus drivers may be employed for public or private companies. It varies by country which is more common. But many countries have regulations on the training and certification requirements and the hours of intercity drivers.

=== Duties ===
Besides the actual operation of the bus, duties of the intercity bus driver include cleaning, inspecting, and maintaining the vehicle, doing simple repairs, checking tickets of passengers or in some cases, collecting fares, loading passengers on and off the bus efficiently, handling the passengers' luggage, enforcing guidelines expected from passengers (such as prohibiting yelling), and dealing with certain types of emergencies.

Good communication skills in the native language of the country and other languages spoken by a large part of the population are also key. Drivers must be able to engage in basic communication with passengers and to give them directions and other information they may need.

Some countries require intercity bus drivers to fill out logs detailing the hours they have driven. This documents they are compliant with the country's laws regarding the maximum number of hours they are permitted to drive.

=== Scheduling ===
Intercity bus drivers are provided with a lot of independence, though they are expected to follow a particular route and schedule as determined by their employer.

On shorter routes, it is possible for a driver to make a round trip and return home on the same day, and sometimes to complete a round trip multiple times in a single day.

On longer routes that exceed or come close to the maximum number of hours an operator can legally drive, drivers will be changed over the course of the route. Either the driver will drive half the work day in one direction, and switch places before driving part of a trip in the other direction on a different vehicle, or the driver will drive the maximum amount of time permitted by law in a single direction, stay overnight, and complete a return trip on the following day. When the latter occurs, the employer will often pay lodging and dining expenses for the driver.

An issue with intercity bus drivers, especially those on longer routes, is taking short breaks for eating and restroom use. Stopping to meet these human needs is a necessity. But making these stops delays the trip, which many passengers want to be as quick and efficient as possible. Often, the driver will pass these breaks onto the passengers and allow them to enjoy the benefits of the break as well.

== Occupational safety ==
Intercity bus driving is generally safe but carries its risks for drivers. Accidents occur, which can be harmful to the driver, passengers, and those in other vehicles involved alike. Dealing with unruly passengers can be another challenge, something which operators are not generally equipped to handle. Such passengers can be harmful to the driver and other passengers alike.

There have also been incidents which have occurred involving intercity bus drivers being assaulted by passengers. One such event occurred on October 3, 2001, when Damir Igric slit a Greyhound driver's throat, resulting in seven deaths (including Igric himself) as the bus crashed.

=== Ergonomics ===
Bus drivers work long hours with minimal breaks, and their daily tasks are often repetitive and done independently. These are often physically labor intensive, requiring the ability to sit for the entirety of a shift of up to 8 hours or more. Working conditions like these can be physical hazards and calls for proper ergonomic conditions. Bus drivers are at increased risk for musculoskeletal disorders and this is often due to poor ergonomics such as limited moving space within the driver's cabin. Symptoms of pain and aching in areas such as the neck, lower back, shoulders, and knees are common. In one study, lower back pain was attributed to exposures to full-body vibrations during driving and difficulty maintaining optimal posture.

Musculoskeletal disorders can also be aggravated by psychosocial aspects of the profession. Work fulfillment can be impacted by high work demands and minimal management support, in addition to reliance on mechanical machinery which may fail causing stress regarding route schedules. In another study, it's shown that musculoskeletal disorders decline greatly when these psychosocial hazards are addressed. The risks of lower back pain can also be exacerbated by sedentary aspects of the profession. This places strong emphasis on workplaces to limit excess working time and to encourage bus drivers to maintain physical activities outside of work hours in order to prevent the onset of musculoskeletal disorders.

=== Airborne illnesses ===
Airborne illnesses such as COVID-19 and the flu are occupational hazards bus drivers face due to limited social distancing on public buses and the essential nature of the job. Bus drivers spend their working hours inside buses with limited ventilation and significant crowding, creating an environment in which airborne illnesses spread. Bus drivers have a significantly higher exposure time than passengers taking the bus, increasing their risk of contracting an airborne illness. In addition to factors such as elevated BMI and older age, the working environment of bus drivers puts them at a higher risk of COVID-19, presenting an occupational hazard.

In terms of the flu, bus/tram drivers are also vulnerable to contracting influenza. Public-facing occupations heighten the odds of contracting influenza due to limited social distancing, resulting in contact with people who are infected. The lack of social distancing, a factor that is oftentimes unavoidable on a bus, means the odds of influenza for bus drivers is elevated.

Various strategies have been implemented (especially during the COVID-19 pandemic) to decrease the spread of airborne illnesses to bus drivers given their susceptibility. These include improving ventilation on buses and making personal protective equipment (PPE) readily available on the job.

=== Emotional stress ===
Mental health and well-being play a huge role in drivers' abilities to properly operate buses, therefore putting themselves and passengers at risk when under emotional stress. According to a systematic review in Mental Health and Prevention published in 2024, many drivers report a lack of recognition in money, esteem, or status for their work efforts. This can directly increase the likelihood of stress and could partly be attributed to the fact that bus drivers are compensated based on distance driven rather than the number of passengers. This incentivizes working long hours which can contribute to mental fatigue due to being mentally vigilant throughout the entire work day. Additionally, driver-passenger conflict correlates with psychological distress which can be mediated by the effects of emotional exhaustion and cynicism. This behavior can include disagreements, physical contact, and fare evasion. Complex driving environments can additionally contribute to stress due to traffic congestion and time constraints have been shown to directly increase adrenaline and cortisol levels in the urine of bus drivers. Early or late working hours can also decrease the quality and amount of sleep for drivers. This has been shown to increase stress levels which in turn also decreases sleep quality, creating a cycle.

Stress at work can additionally feed into job burnout, which is associated with alcohol abuse, depression, and sleep disorders. Additionally, emotional exhaustion has been shown to increase pro-inflammatory mediators which can interact with the development of depression or anxiety. According to the CDC, anxiety and chronic stress can be risk factors for heart disease.

=== Vehicular accidents ===
Bus drivers bear responsibility for their passengers while facing various situations - stress, fatigue, long hours of inactivity, passenger distractions, traffic predicaments – all of which contribute to increased risk of vehicular accidents. Multiple of the aforementioned situations require driver alertness and ability to make quick decisions, which may be impaired when driver performance is hindered by fatigue or lack of sleep. In the United States, over 60,000 accidents involving buses occur each year and the number is only growing. When on shift, drivers must remain alert of their surroundings and there is increasing concern around driver alertness and fatigue. Fatigue can be due to deregulation of circadian rhythm, workload, as well as loss of sleep. For drivers who work at night and experience sleep during the day, it negatively affects their circadian rhythm, impairing their ability to stay alert, increasing the severity of potential accidents. Inconsistent and irregular sleep, associated with insomnia, is also a contributing factor in increase of vehicular accidents. This manifests from truncated sleep times, sleep deprivation, or person medical history. There are issues with undiagnosed sleep disorders, therefore going untreated.

Interventions and recommendations to better improve occupational health of bus drivers and decrease risks of vehicular accidents include provided diagnoses and treatment of sleep disorders that in turn may address driver fatigue, impairment, and degree of alertness. There are also calls to regulate work-time cycles to assist with issues of truncated sleep. The health of bus drivers is in tandem with the health of their passengers, themselves, and others on the road.

=== Diesel exposure ===
Diesel exhaust exposure to bus drivers are possibilities due to the nature of the occupation. Diesel particulate matter (DPM) has been classified by the International Agency for Research on Cancer (IARC) as a possible carcinogen to humans and poses serious health risks due to its small particle size. The small size of the DPM particles range from <1 mm in diameter making it easy to inhale which is an issue when it gets trapped and accumulates within the bronchial and alveolar area of the lung. Workers who come regularly come in contact with diesel exhaust can face health issues like irritation of the respiratory track, lung cancer, respiratory diseases, along with headaches and nausea. Exposure levels also vary from ventilation, bus type, and route as more urban areas likely experience greater traffic and more diesel exhaust. Occupations that use heavy equipment in industries like transportation often deal heavily with diesel exhaust, exasperating potential for health issues with exposure, and occupational hazards for bus drivers.

=== Heat exposure ===
Occupational heat stress is a health risk for bus drivers. Bus drivers spending long hours in vehicles may experience various forms of work-related heat stress, especially in warmer months and regions. Heat-related illnesses that can impact bus drivers include dizziness, heat exhaustion, heat stroke, sweaty palms, heat cramps, fainting, heat rash, and fogging in glasses. If left unaddressed, these factors can be a risk to bus drivers and passengers.

Occupational heat stress risk can be impacted by environmental conditions, such as air temperature, humidity, sunlight, and air speed. The presence of heat or conditioning sources in the work area is significant, as well as the clothing an individual wears on the job.

Mitigating heat stress can be approached in a variety of ways. The Occupational Safety and Health Administration (OSHA) recommends drinking cool water, wearing loose-fitting and breathable clothing, and taking breaks in cooler areas. Easing into work is particularly important. Any new or returning employees must acclimate to warmer work environments. To account for this, OSHA recommends the "20% Rule:" During the first day of an employee's shift, less than 20% of the shift should be completed at full intensity in the heat. Each day, the duration of time spent doing standard work under heat-intense conditions can increase by 20%. Information on heat-related health risks and appropriate measures to mitigate occupational heat stress is available.

== By country ==
=== Australia ===
In Australia, bus and coach drivers need a driver's licence (issued in an Australian state or territory) for the class of vehicle they drive.

Additionally, they are required to possess a driver authorisation to drive a bus (also issued by the state or territory). This has different names in different states, for example, Driver Authorisation in Queensland, Driver Accreditation in Victoria, General Driver Authorisation in New South Wales, Public Passenger Vehicle Ancillary Certificate in Tasmania and so on. This authorisation entails a regular review of driving history, criminal history, and medical assessment for fitness to drive.

In 2012, Australia had a fleet of 90,599 buses and collectively travelled about 2.0 billion km. The average age of the national fleet is 11.0 years.

In 2011, there were 40,900 bus and coach drivers employed in the industry. They work an average of 41.7 hours/week and the average age is 54 years. The main employing industries are Transport, Postal and Warehousing 87.4%, and the remainder include Health Care and Social Assistance 4%, Education and Training 3.1%, and Accommodation and Food Services 2.7%.

=== New Zealand ===
Bus and coach drivers require either a class 2 or class 4 heavy vehicle licence corresponding to the weight and number of axles of their vehicle. Drivers must apply for a P (passenger) endorsement from NZ Transport Agency and hold a large passenger service licence to take fare-paying passengers.

Drivers of school buses for special needs children must comply with SESTA requirements.

=== Singapore ===
Bus captains generally require a class 3 or class 4 license to drive. Some companies have different rules.

Most bus captains in Singapore work for the major public operators in the country such as SBS Transit and SMRT. Tower Transit Singapore and Go-Ahead Singapore are foreign bus companies operating in Singapore. An average bus captain makes about $2000 to $3000 a month. Although some companies have been offering more recently.

Most bus captains tend to work long hours and raises concerns for the public transport industry in the country. Majority of the bus captains are foreigners because most Singaporeans do not prefer working as such. Companies aim to employ more local workers.

=== Sweden ===
Berta Persson (1893-1961) was the first woman bus driver in Sweden. Nicknamed Buss-Berta, she drove the Kappelshamn-Visby bus route between 1927 and 1934.

=== United Kingdom ===
In the United Kingdom drivers must have passed the Passenger Carrying Vehicle (PCV) practical driving and theory test. PCV drivers also have to possess a Certificate of Professional Competence card which requires extra training to be taken. Service bus drivers in the UK are not subject to the working hours restrictions devised by the European Union if their journeys do not exceed 30 miles radius, but are governed by less stringent UK Drivers' Hours Regulations. For example, a service bus driver may drive for 5.5 hours without a break in the UK.

People with certain medical conditions are excluded from becoming bus drivers. Some of these conditions include migraines (if they affect vision), alcoholism and epilepsy.

Because of the additional workload many buses are fitted with closed-circuit television in an attempt to protect drivers from an increasing number of attacks which has resulted in a recruitment crisis in some British cities.

=== United States ===
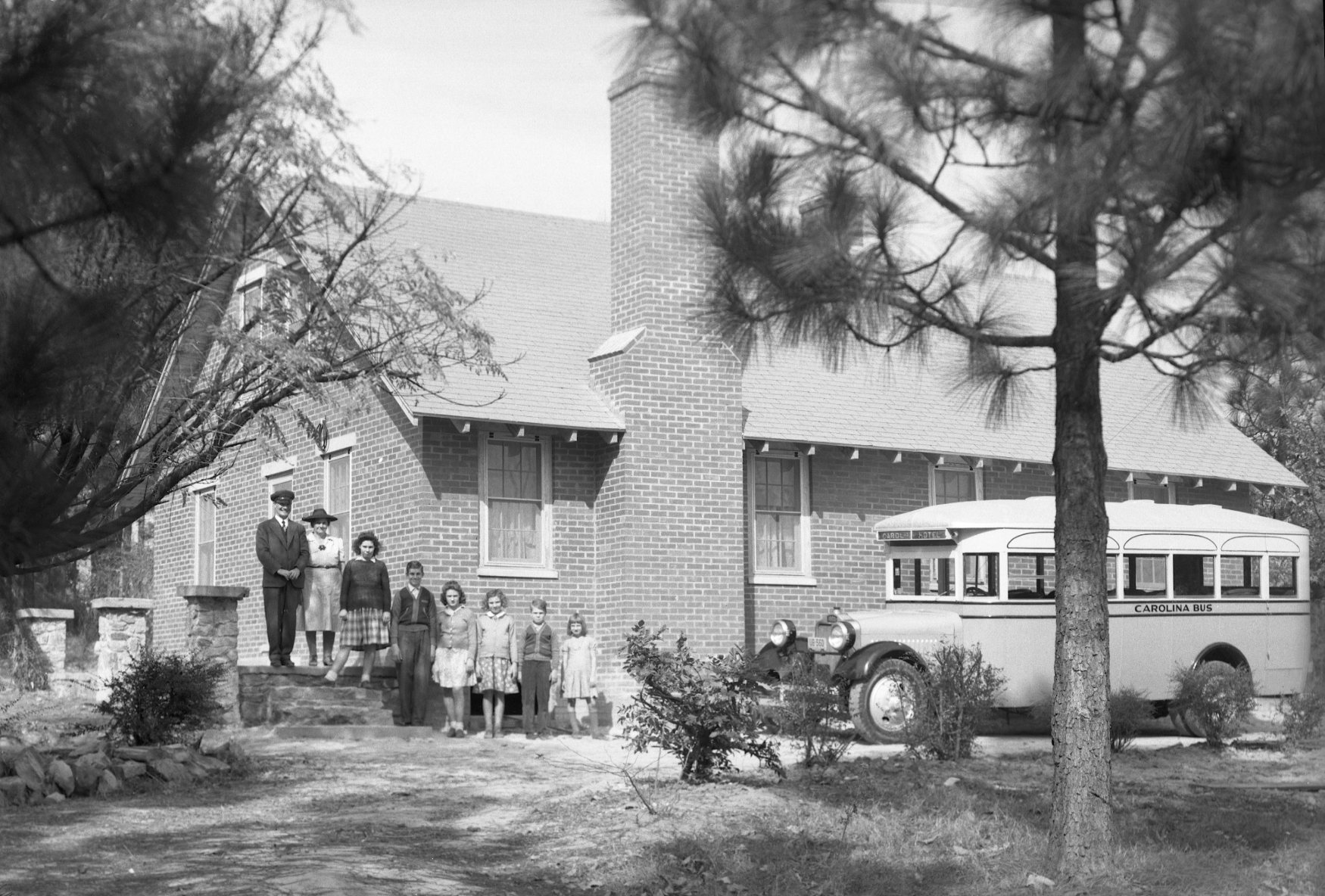
A man wearing a bus driver uniform is seen with his family; bus in background, North Carolina, 1920s

As of 2016, there are approximately 687,200 U.S. employed bus drivers. One of the most common jobs in the United States for a bus driver is to work for a public school or a public school district, transporting students aboard a school bus to and from the school building and school events. As of 2004, 71% of bus drivers in the U.S. were employed by schools. In other countries, school transport is often provided by the same companies that run other bus services in the area, so school bus driver is not a separate position.

In the United States, finding a position as a bus driver usually requires that the individual possess a commercial driver's license (CDL) and specialized training for the vehicle, as well as a Passenger endorsement. Various other educational and vocational training are usually required, but this varies from place to place.

== See also ==
- Bus conductor
- Hours of service, regulations in the United States
- Drivers' working hours (EU)
- List of bus operating companies
