= Bunge Airbase =

Bunge Airbase Bunge Flygfält
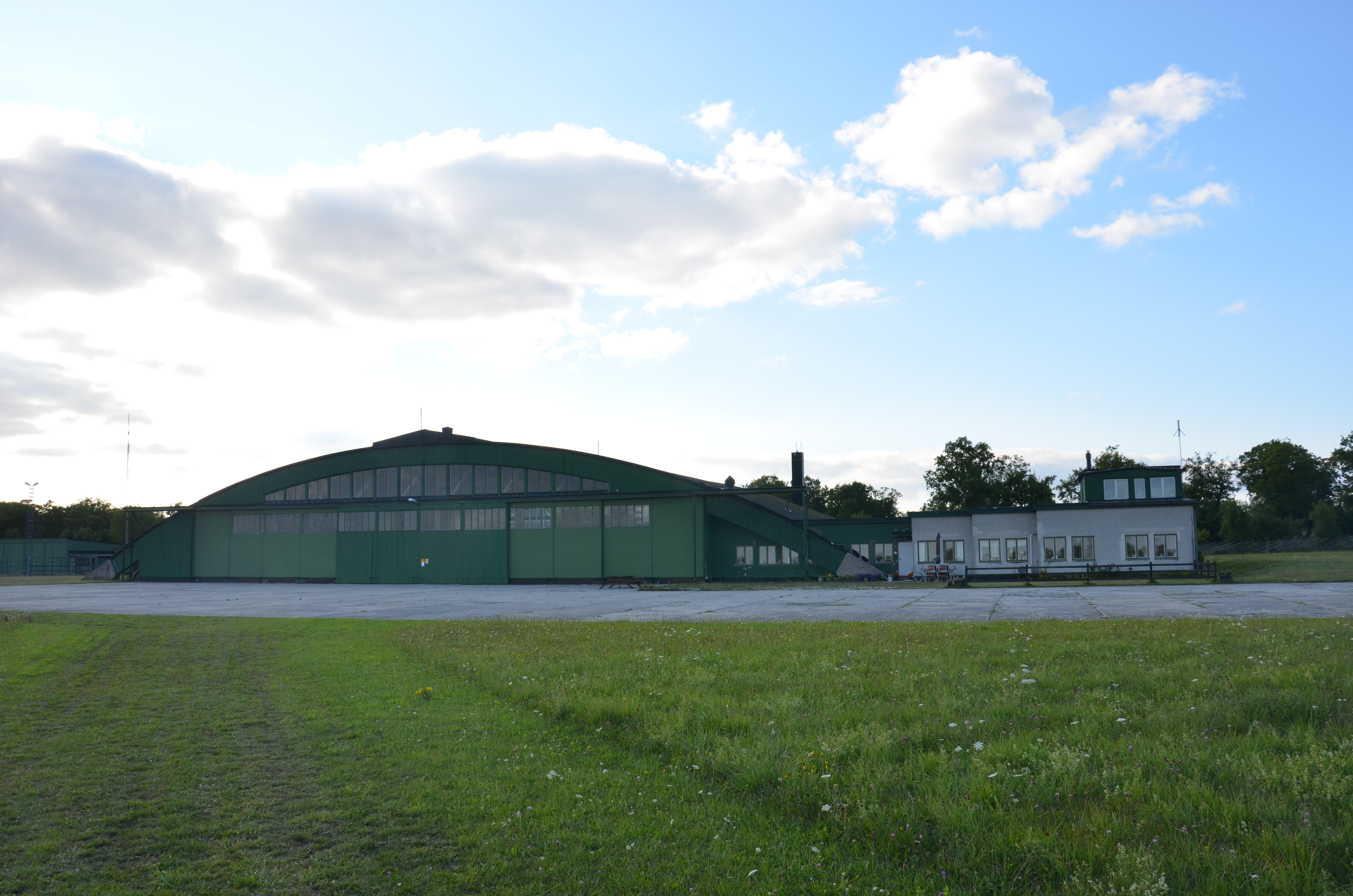
- Bunge Airbase
- IATA: none; ICAO: ESVB

Summary
- Owner: Inger Martinsson
- Location: Fårösund, Sweden
- Built: 1939
- Elevation AMSL: 66 ft / 20 m
- Coordinates: 57°51′00″N 019°02′3″E
- Website: http://www.bungeflygfalt.se
- Interactive map of Bunge Airbase

Runways
Direction	Length		Surface
Direction	ft	m	Surface
03/21	2,214	675	Asphalt (not in use)
09/27	3,379	1,030	Asphalt / grass
16/34	3,117	950	Asphalt / grass

Bunge Airbase (ICAO: ESVB) is a privately owned airfield. It is situated south of Fårösund on the northern part of the island of Gotland, Sweden.

== History ==
In 1937, work began on the construction of an airfield near the naval air base in Fårösund. Twenty bombers were to be stationed on the island, and together with naval and coastal artillery defenses their purpose was to defend northern Gotland. The runways and hangars were completed in 1939, and in the early summer of 1940 fighter planes from the J 9 division were temporarily moved to Bunge from Göta Wing (F 9). In July, both F 9 divisions and the J 8 division were moved to Bunge, where the later was used for training purposes by the Swedish Air Force. In 1943, B 3 bombers from the Västmanland Wing, and S 16 and S 17 aircraft from Södermanland Wing (F 11) were moved to the airbase.

During the final years of World War II, tensions increased in the area around Gotland, with both German and Allied aircraft violating Swedish airspace. In 1944, the Swedish Air Force subsequently installed landing barriers around the field with the exception of the landing strip.

The airfield was used by the Air Force to train pilots on propeller aircraft between 1939 and 1965, and as a military airport from 1965 to 1991. The Air Force also trained members of the Swedish Women's Voluntary Defence Organization at the airfield until it was abandoned by the military in 1991.

Today, Bunge Airbase is mostly used for general aviation and various non-aviation activities. Local airline Rauk Air previously operated scheduled services to Stockholm Bromma Airport and charter flights within Sweden and Europe.
