= Lake Bästeträsk =

- Bästeträsk (Swedish)
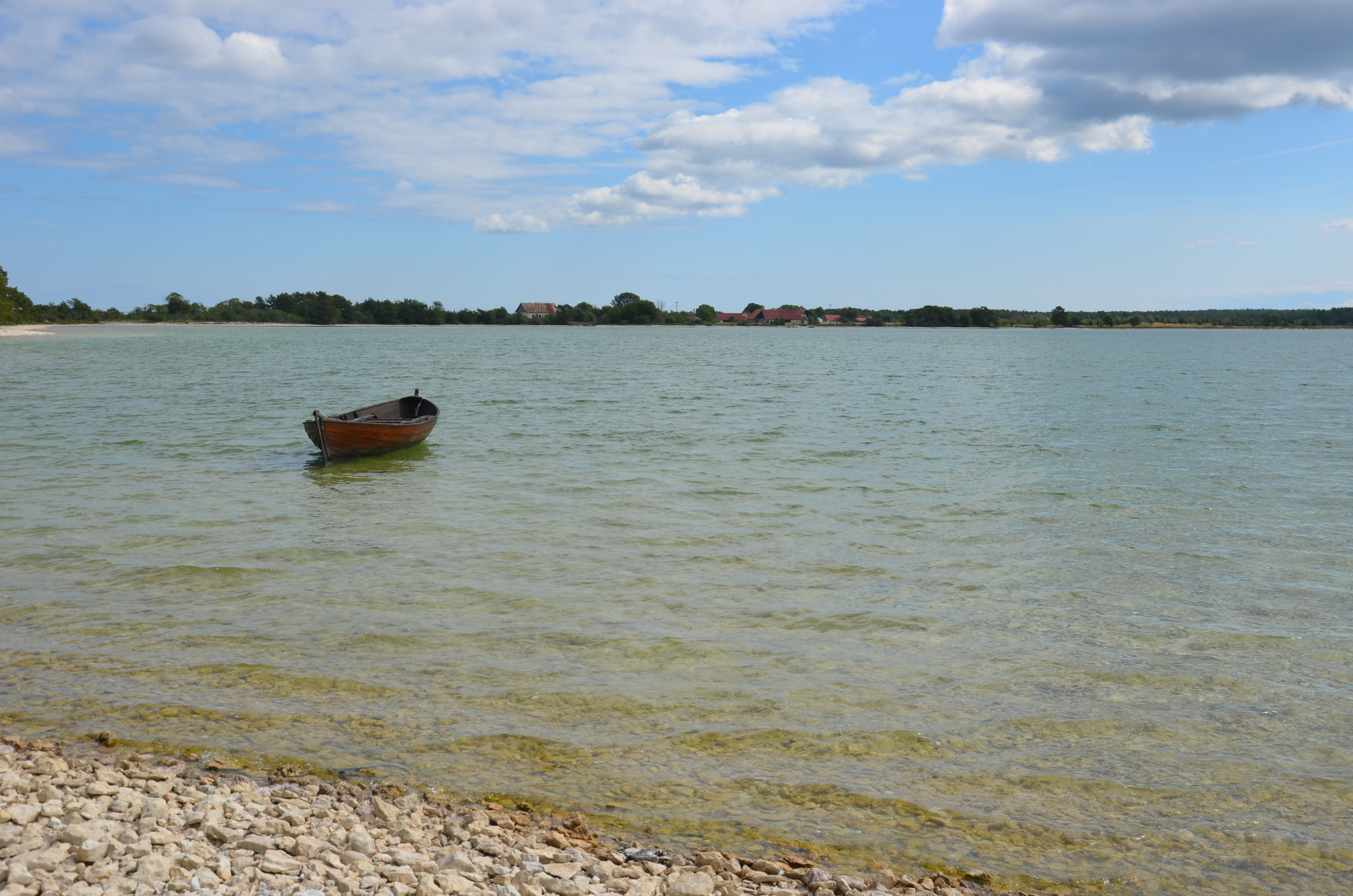
- Lake Bästeträsk seen from the western shore

- Location within Gotland
- Location: Fleringe, Gotland
- Coordinates: 57.89886°N 18.92848°E
- Type: freshwater lake
- Primary inflows: the mires of Släkmyr, Ojnaremyr and Tvärlingemyr
- Primary outflows: a culvert in the north, previously for electricity production
- Catchment area: 39.92 km^{2} (15.41 sq mi)
- Basin countries: Sweden
- Surface area: 6.52 km^{2} (2.52 sq mi)
- Max. depth: 4.5 m (15 ft)
- Shore length^{1}: 14.8 km (9.2 mi)
- Surface elevation: 6.1 m (20 ft)
- Frozen: winter
- Islands: Falholmen, Storholmen, Lillholmen
- ^{1} Shore length is not a well-defined measure.

Lake Bästeträsk is a freshwater lake located in the northern part of the Swedish island of Gotland. It is the largest lake on the island.

== Geography ==
The lake is located at the north end of Gotland, 0.4 km (0.25 mi) from the Baltic Sea. It has three islands: Falholmen, Storholmen and Lillholmen. The lake forms 681 ha (1,680 acres) of the 1,494 ha (3,690 acres) Bästeträsk nature reserve, one of the largest on Gotland. With an area of 6.52 km^{2} (2.52 sq mi) it is the largest lake on the island. Despite its size, the maximum depth is only 4.5 m (15 ft) and in most places the lake is considerably shallower.

== Geology ==
Most of the lake is surrounded by a 0.5 to 1 m (1.6 to 3.3 ft) high wall of gravel and larger blocks of stone known as a "beach barricade". The wall has been displaced or pushed out by the expanding ice during the winter. The bottom of the lake is made up of blocks of stone, especially in the shallower parts, and sediments.

Lake Bästeträsk is connected to the Baltic Sea through the stream Arån, which is a breeding ground for sea trout.

== Biology ==
Bästeträsk is a freshwater reserve with very clean inflows, a number of them has the same aspects as drinking water. The water has a greenish tint with low nutrient content, making the lake devoid of vegetation save for stands of Chara aspera, Chara tomentosa, Chara globularis and the only occurrence in Sweden of Nitella tenuissima. It is inhabited by species such as northern pike, perch, roach, rudd, tench, European bullhead and whitefish. The lake was stocked with crayfish during the 1920s. A number of rare lichens and polyporales can be found in the nature reserve surrounding the lake, along with the land snail Cochlicopa nitens. The islands in the lake have a large colony of common eider.

== Uses ==
The area around Bästeträsk has been used for quarrying limestone since the 1650s. Production ceased in 1990, but traces of the industry remain. Most visible are the two smaller quarry lakes to the north of the lake. The northwest of these lakes, "The Blue Lagoon", is a well visited swimming site.

The lake's outflow in the north was dammed up and led through a culvert for production of hydroelectricity following a decision in 1939. As of 2015 only the culvert remains.

In winter the lake is sometimes used for tour skating.
