= Kappelshamn =

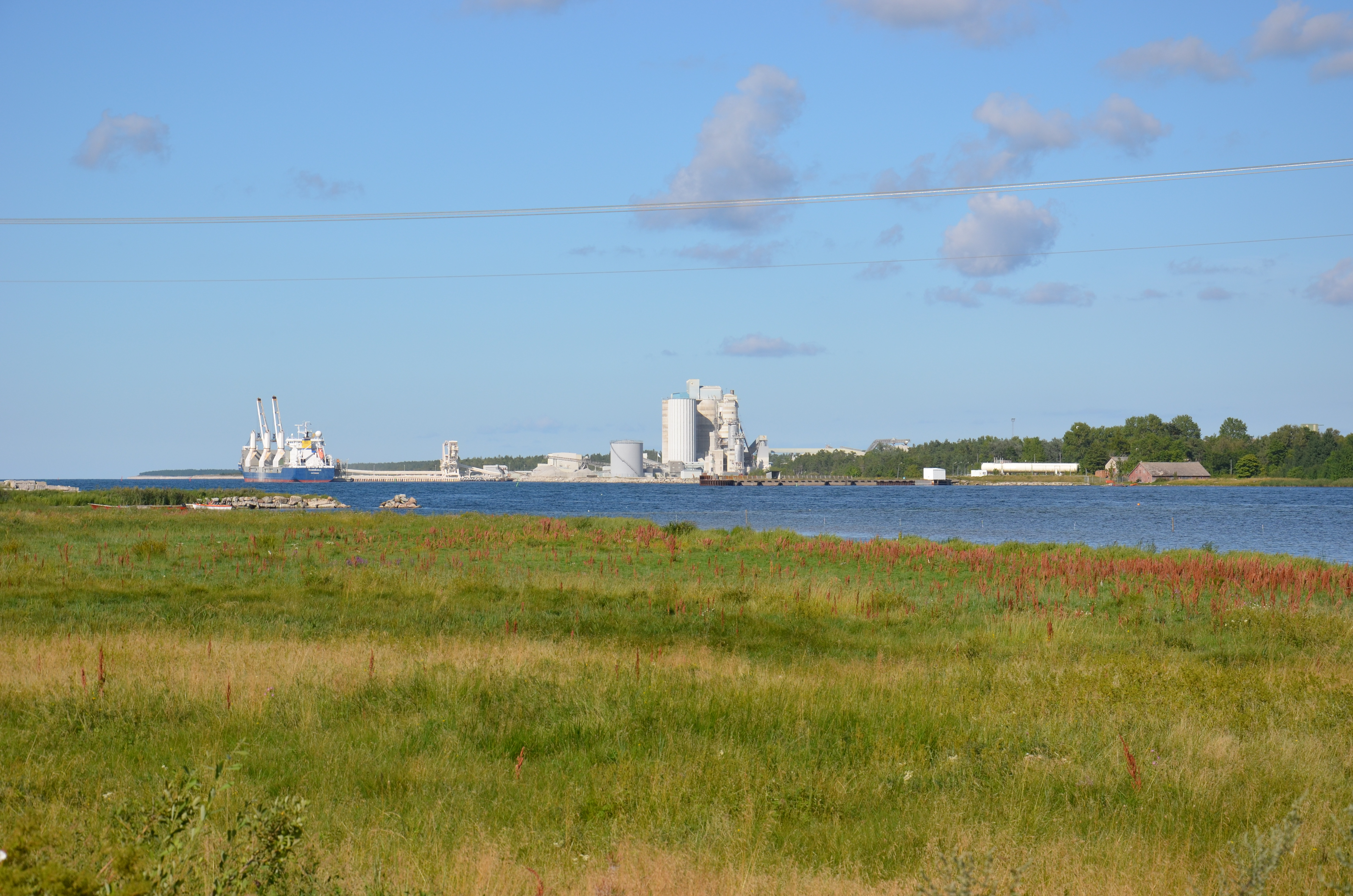
- Storungs at Kappelshamn

- Location within Gotland
- Coordinates: 57°51′N 18°47′E
- Country: Sweden
- Province: Gotland
- County: Gotland County
- Municipality: Gotland Municipality

Area
  - Total: 0.75 km^{2} (0.29 sq mi)

Population (2010)
  - Total: 115
  - Density: 159/km^{2} (410/sq mi)
- Time zone: UTC+1 (CET)
  - Summer (DST): UTC+2 (CEST)
- Website: www.kappelshamn.se

Kappelshamn (Swedish pronunciation: [kapɛlsˈhamn]) is a settlement on the Swedish island of Gotland. It had 115 inhabitants in 2010.

Located northeast of Visby and north of Slite, it is mainly known for its race track, Gotland Ring. In addition there are facilities catering for tourists, such as sheltered beaches and a campsite.

Storugns, located across the gulf from Kappelshamn, is the largest deposit of limestone in the Nordic countries. Developed since the early 1980s by Nordkalk, the limestone mined from Gotland is mainly shipped from the port of Storugns to the steel mills in Sweden and Finland.
