= Arlanda Line =

Railway line in Sweden

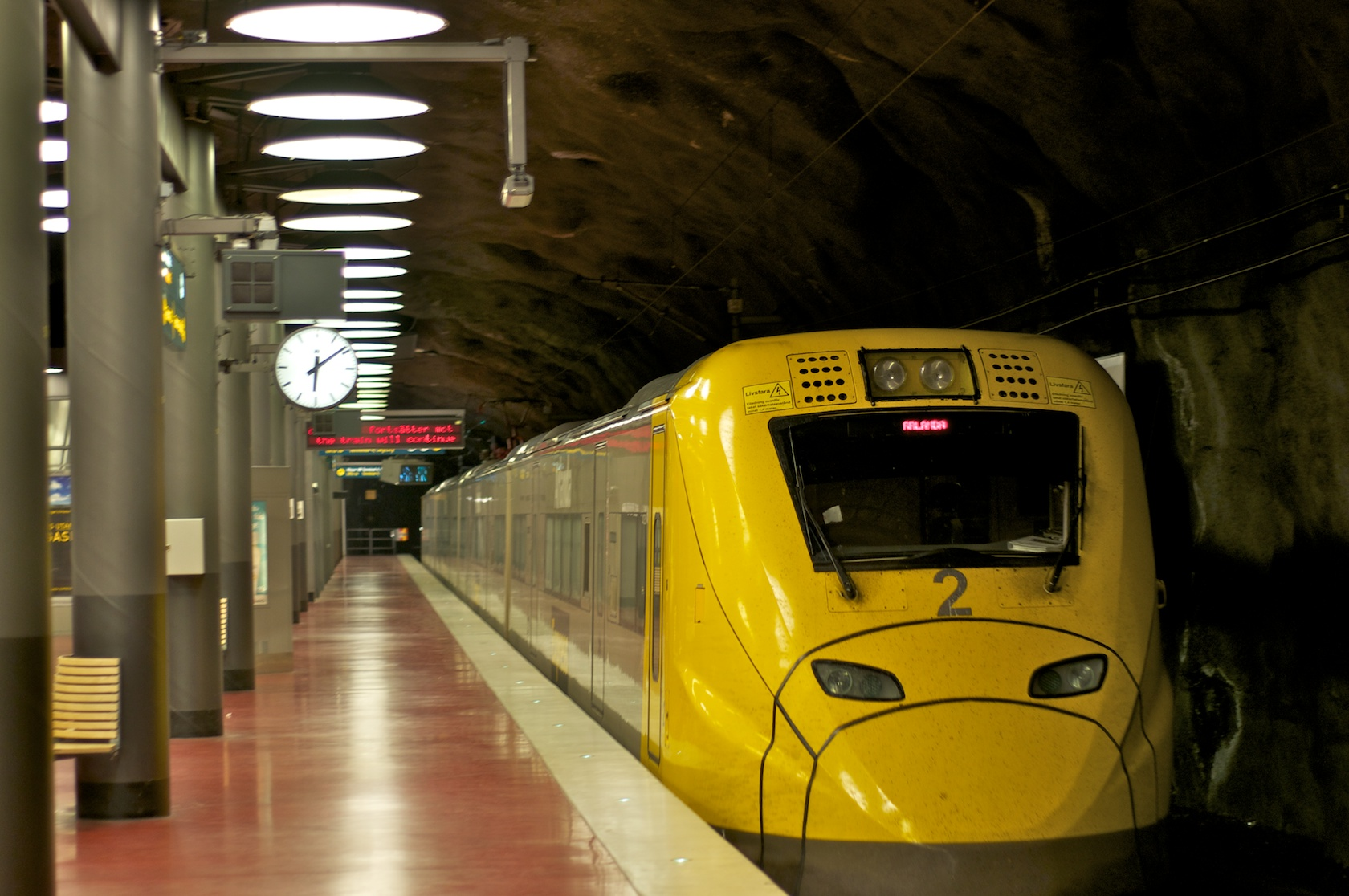
- An Arlanda Express X3 train

Overview
- Owner: Arlanda Infrastructure
- Termini: Rosersberg; Märsta
- Stations: 3

Service
- Type: High-speed railway
- System: Swedish railway network
- Operator(s): Arlanda Express; SJ; SL; SJ Norrlandståg; Mälartåg
- Rolling stock: X3

History
- Opened: 25 November 1999

Technical
- Line length: 19 kilometres (12 mi)
- Num of tracks: Double
- Character: Airport rail link
- Track gauge: 1,435 mm (4 ft 8 1/2 in)
- Electrification: 15 kV 16.7 Hz AC
- Operating speed: 200 km/h (125 mph)

The Arlanda Line (Swedish: Arlandabanan) is a 19-kilometre (12 mi) long railway line which allows trains on the East Coast Line to reach Stockholm Arlanda Airport in Sigtuna Municipality, Sweden. The Arlanda Line branches from the East Coast Line at Rosersberg and rejoins again at Myrbacken. It is built for speeds of 200 kilometres per hour (120 mph), is electrified at 15 kV 16.7 Hz AC and is double track. The 5-kilometre (3.1 mi) section under the airport runs in a tunnel, and has three stations: Arlanda South, Arlanda Central and Arlanda North.

The Arlanda Express operates four times per hour, increasing to six times per hour during rush hour, to and from Stockholm Central Station, the largest railway station in Sweden and in the Nordic region. Operated by A-Train, the service uses seven X3 trains and calls at the north and south stations. The line is also served by 70 other regional and intercity trains daily, operated by SJ, SJ Norrlandståg and (with very limited service) Upptåget, and since December 2012 also by the Stockholm commuter rail network. These all stop at Arlanda Central.

In 1994, A-Train was awarded the right to build the line in a public–private partnership, where A-Train financed about half the 6 billion Swedish krona (SEK) to build the line. The private consortium was granted a 40-year permit to operate the line in exchange for all direct traffic and the right to collect usage fees from other train companies. The line opened in 1999 and A-Train holds the sole right to operate to Stockholm, and collects a fee from other train operators using the line. The line itself is owned by Arlandabanan Infrastructure AB, which is owned by the Ministry of Enterprise, Energy and Communications.

== Service ==
The Arlanda Express is the main operator of the line and offers a direct service from Stockholm Central Station to Arlanda North Station and Arlanda South Station up to six times per hour. Travel time is 20 minutes using the company's seven X3 trains.

Since 9 December 2012, Stockholm commuter rail trains stop at Arlanda Central every 30 minutes (60 minutes on weekend mornings and nights). It takes 38 minutes from Arlanda C to Stockholm C, and 18 minutes to Uppsala C.

The station is also served by 70 daily long-distance trains operated by SJ. SJ operates northbound X 2000 trains from Stockholm, which may continue southwards to destinations in southern Sweden. SJ Norrlandståg, a subsidiary of SJ, operates Norrlandståget ("The Norrland Train") with two daily connections from Stockholm to Narvik.

From 2006 to 2012, Upptåget operated a commuter train service every 30 minutes between Upplands Väsby and Uppsala via Arlanda C. At Upplands Väsby, passengers could transfer to Stockholm commuter rail. When Stockholm commuter rail started its service from Älvsjö (Tumba) to Uppsala C, Upptåget ended its commuter service, except for a few morning and night trains on weekends.

In 2007, the line transported 4 million people, of which 2.7 million were air passengers who used the Arlanda Express, 0.6 million were employees at the airport, and 0.7 million traveled with other train operators. Between 1,200 and 1,500 passengers board and disembark Upptåget trains at the airport each day.

There are no freight trains because of safety considerations in the underground station. Before construction there was a plan to transport aviation fuel to the airport, which was transported by truck from the port of Stockholm. Since 2006 the fuel is transported by train on the old line to Märsta and transported by pipeline to the airport.

== History ==
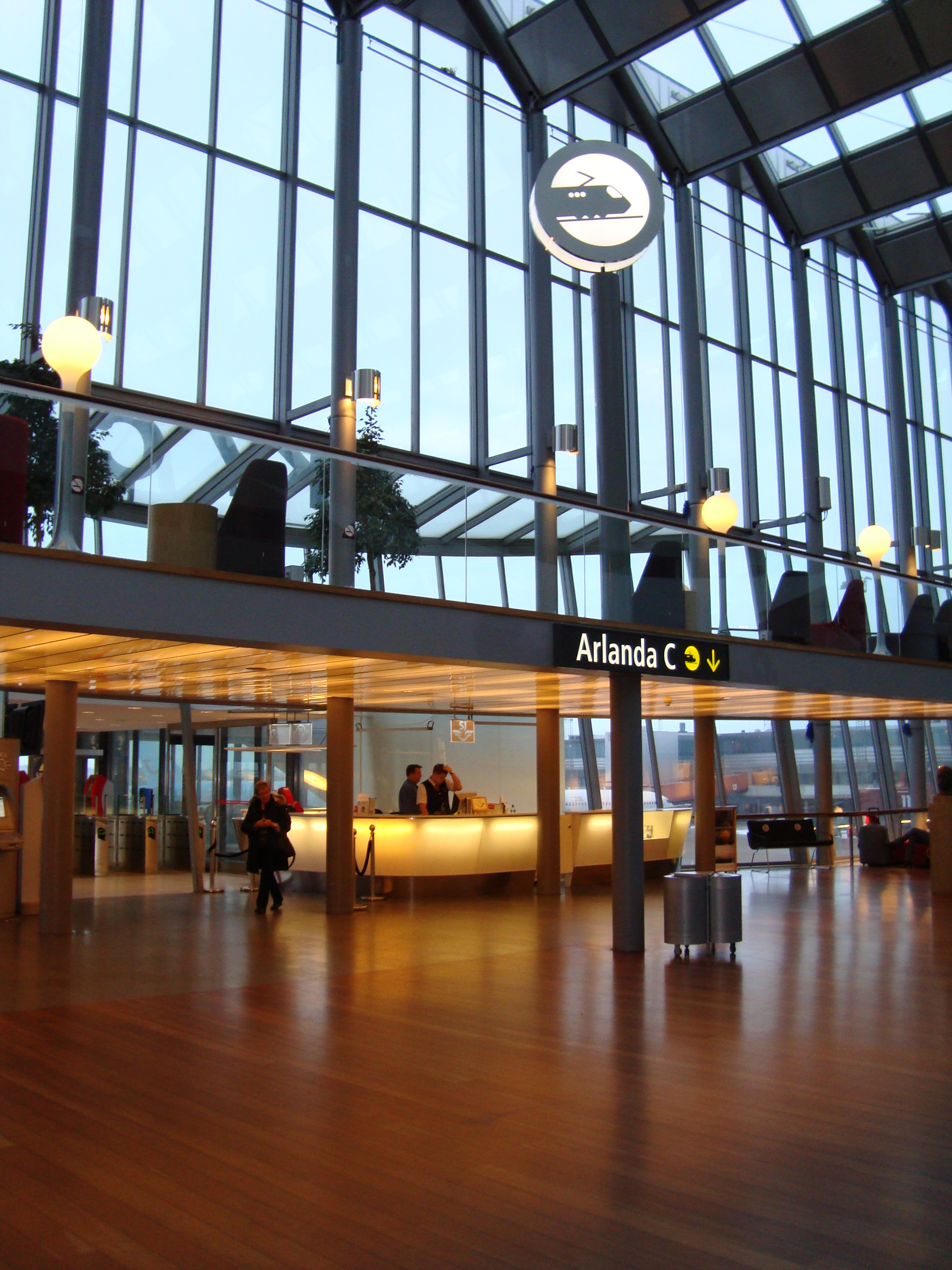
Entrance to Arlanda Central Station from the airport

Plans for an airport rail link from the central business district of Stockholm and the airport was launched in the early 1980s. The goal was to reduce road congestion and emissions while allowing Arlanda to keep increasing passenger numbers. The Swedish Rail Administration made a specific plan in the late 1980s which involved the construction of a branch from the existing East Coast Line. This resulted in a project plan which was launched in 1990, which specifically suggested Rosersberg and Odensala as the intersections with the existing line. The political decision to build the line was taken in 1993. Estimates at the time gave a ridership of 5.1 million passengers per year in 2005.

The Swedish Rail Administration had proposed that the line was to be built with the government agency as owner and with either SJ or private railway companies as train operators. However, the Cabinet of Carl Bildt wanted private sector involvement in the construction and operation of the line. In 1993, the Government put in place a public tender to build and operate the line. In 1994, Arlanda Link Consortium was chosen, consisting of the Nordic Construction Company, SIAB, Vattenfall, GEC-Alsthom and Mowlem. A-Banan Projekt AB was established as a limited company in 1994 to oversee the project. The consortium established A-Train AB to be the project developer and then operate the Arlanda Express until 2040. The legal responsibility for the project was transferred from the consortium to A-Train in 1995. As part of the agreement, A-Train received from the Swedish Government 850 million Swedish krona (SEK) in a grant and SEK 1 billion in a loan to help finance the project. The company was also allowed to operate a shuttle service from Stockholm C to Arlanda and charge a non-discriminating fee for all other trains using the line.

Total investment costs for the project were SEK 6 billion, of which SEK 2 billion was financed through state grants to the Swedish Rail Administration who built the quadruple track along the East Coast Line. The public–private partnership part of the project involved two new tracks at Stockholm C and the Arlanda Line, costing SEK 4.1 billion. Of this, SEK 2.4 billion was financed by the state. In addition, the state held a financial guarantee to Nordea for the X3 trains, should A-Train fail to meets its financial obligations to the bank. A-Train was also granted an interest-free deferral on the payment of the fees at Stockholm C and Arlanda, costing the state SEK 90 million. Of A-Train's capital loan for SEK 2.2 billion, SEK 1.8 billion was borrowed from three state-owned financial institutions: the Swedish National Debt Office, the Swedish Export Credit Corporation and the Nordic Investment Bank. In addition, 20% of the share capital was secured through Vattenfall's equity in the company.

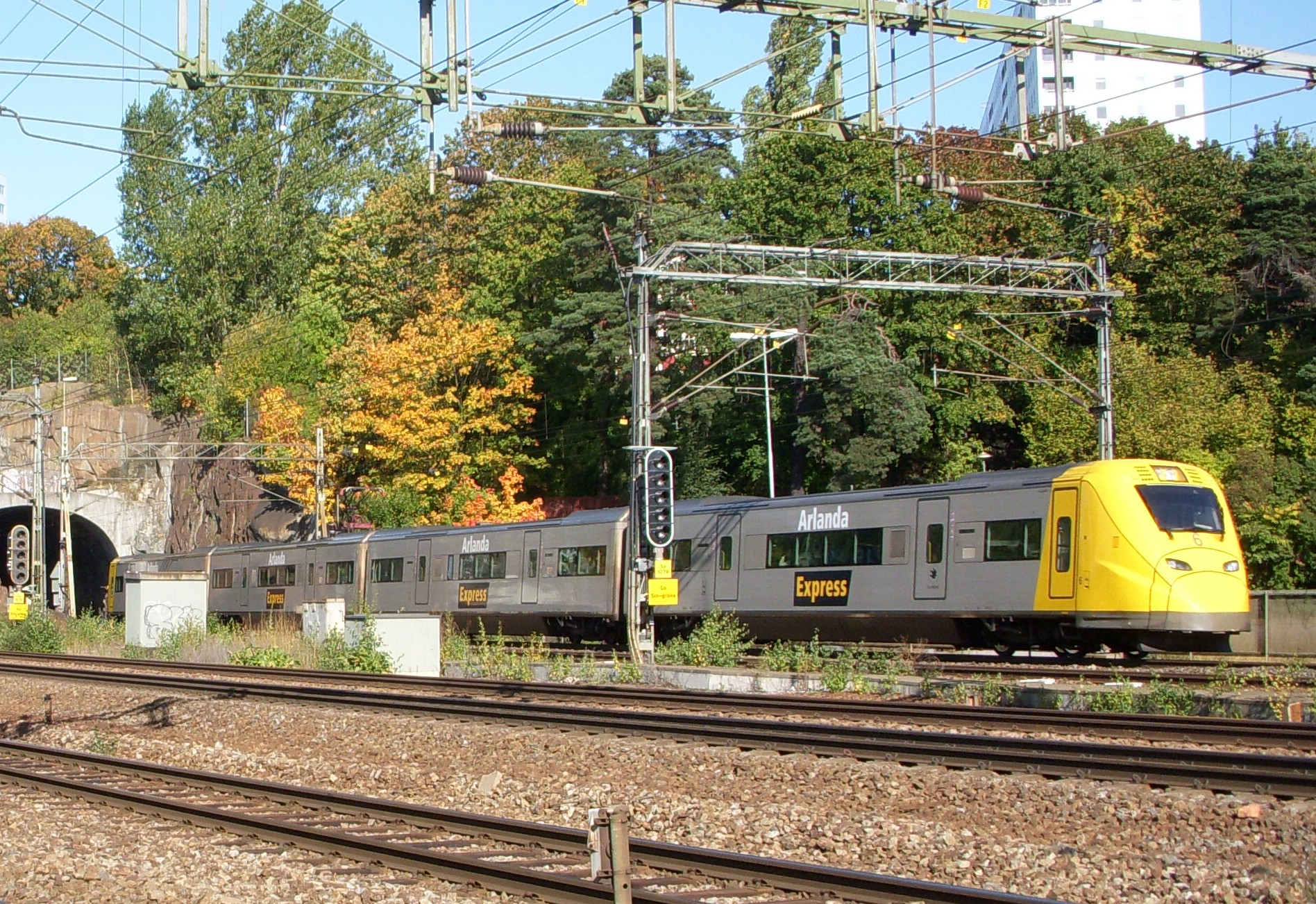
X3 on the East Coast Line

The Arlanda Line and the Arlanda Express started operations on 25 November 1999. After the construction was completed, the ownership of the infrastructure was transferred to A-Banan Projekt. However, A-Train is responsible for paying for all maintenance and operating costs of the line. In 2004, A-Train was bought by Macquarie Group, who paid SEK 70 million for the company, in addition to taking over debt worth SEK 330 million.

In 2004, the Swedish National Audit Office criticized the process of building and financing the Arlanda Line, and stated that the State had taken more financial risk than the Riksdag had been informed about. It also criticized the Government for giving additional financial support to A-Train in the form of guarantees without informing the Riksdag, and having an unclear management strategy. It also commented that the traffic forecasts during planning were incorrect. The original plans showed an economic benefit of SEK 4 billion. However, because A-Train is free to set its ticket prices as it wishes, the high prices resulted in too few passengers taking the Arlanda Line for it to be of economic benefit to the Swedish community, and the line failed to maximise its economic impact through reduced road congestion and emissions.

In 2006, Upptåget started operating on the Arlanda Line. In 2008, A-Banan Projekt changed its name to Arlanda Infrastructure. Storstockholms Lokaltrafik stated in 2008 that they intended to use the line for a new branch of the Stockholm commuter rail network.

In a motion passed by the Riksdag on the 7 October 2008, the Arlanda Line Agreement was unanimously criticized and characterized as the "worst possible agreement Arlanda could have". A-Train is free to set whatever fees its sees fit on the line, both regarding their own ticket prices on the Arlanda Express and what fees it charges other train operators. This framework had resulted in a significant rise in ticket prices and results in a low levels of public transport use for ground transportation to the airport.

The Swedish State holds an option to purchase the traffic rights from A-Train in 2010, which would eliminate the fees and allow other operators to run directly from the airport to the city center. As of 2008, the train had a 9% market share for employees and a 25% market share for passengers traveling to the airport. Commentators and politicians have stated that the business model results in a low utilization of the line because of the high ticket prices, which has caused the airport to not reach its targeted emission goals.

The CEO of A-Train, Per Thorstensson, stated that it would be a waste of tax payers' money to purchase the line in 2010, as the state would receive the line free of charge in 2040. Originally A-Train was required to accumulate capital of SEK 600 million before it could pay dividends, but this was changed to SEK 150 million in 2008, after an agreement was made with Arlandabanan Infrastructure.

== Organisation ==
The Arlanda Line in its entirety is owned by the state-owned Arlanda Infrastructure, which also owns platforms 1 and 2 at Stockholm C. A-Train holds a monopoly on the right to transport passengers from Stockholm to Arlanda; other train operators only have the right to transport passengers to the airport from other towns and cities. In 2008, the cost of a boarding or embarking passenger at Arlanda C was SEK 75. This results in a ticket from Uppsala to Arlanda costing SEK 136, while a ticket on the same train but traveling onwards to Stockholm C only costs SEK 64. Similarly the cost of a ticket to the airport with the Arlanda Express is considerably higher than that of a ticket to Uppsala, which is twice as far away.
