= Arlanda Express =

Express train running between Stockholm and Arlanda airport

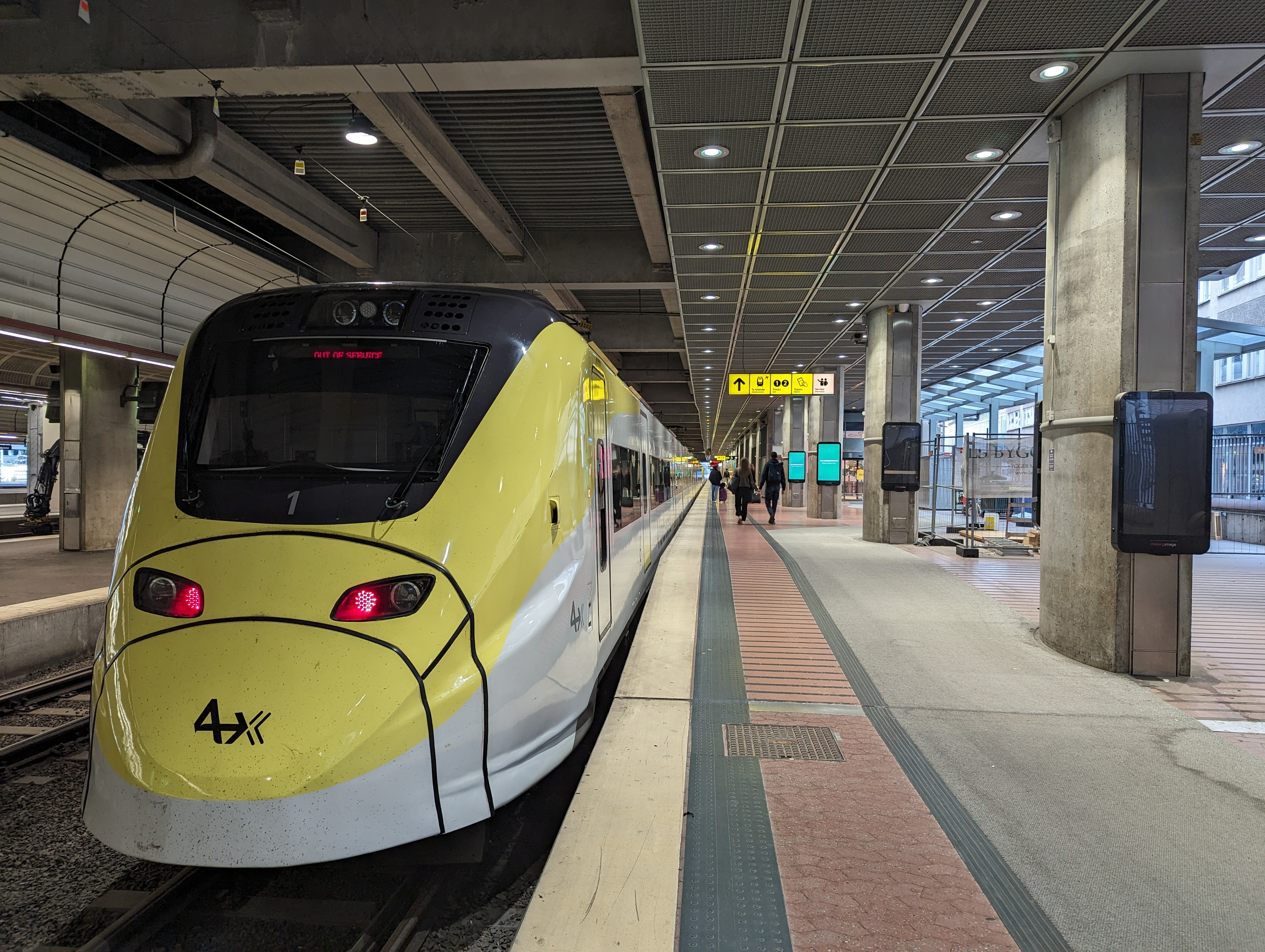
- X3 at Stockholm Central in 2023

Overview
- Termini: Stockholm Central; Arlanda North
- Stations: 3
- Website: www.arlandaexpress.com

Service
- Type: Airport rail link
- Operator: A-Train AB
- Rolling stock: X3

History
- Opened: 25 November 1999

Technical
- Line length: 39 kilometres (24 mi)
- Track gauge: 1,435 mm (4 ft 8 1/2 in)

Arlanda Express is an airport rail link connecting Stockholm Central Station with the Stockholm Arlanda Airport, located outside Stockholm, Sweden. Operated by A-Train AB, the trip takes 18 minutes and runs three to six times per hour using seven X3 electric multiple units. The services operate over the East Coast and Arlanda Lines calling at Stockholm Central, Arlanda North and Arlanda South stations. The service was used by 2.7 million passengers in 2007 and by 3.3 million passengers in 2012, after a decrease in passenger numbers due to COVID-19, the service has returned to 3.4 million passengers in 2023.

Planning of the airport link started in the 1980s. In 1993 the Government of Sweden issued a tender for a public–private partnership (PPP) to build the Arlanda Line. The construction of the line was subsidized with a combination of some state grants and large state loans. The successful tenderer would receive a monopoly on traffic between the airport and Stockholm until 2040. The line and the services were inaugurated on 25 November 1999. The PPP contract has since been criticized for being unclear, uneconomical for the state and leading to a low utilization of the service as ticket prices are very expensive at 340 SEK (around 30 EUR) for an adult single ticket on the very short journey. The service is operated by A-Train AB which is owned by the Swedish investment company EQT since 2025.

== Service ==
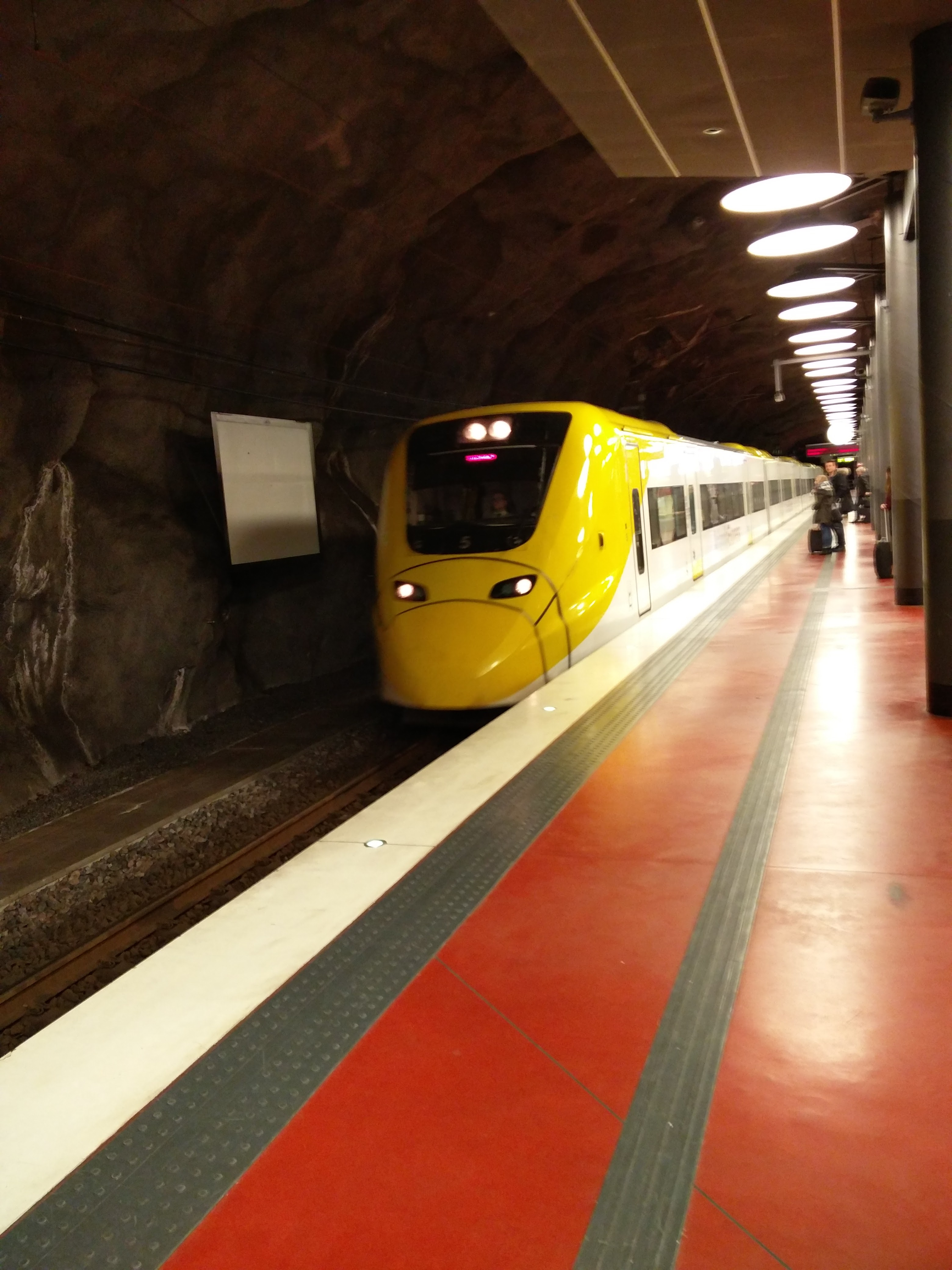
X3 at Arlanda South in March 2016

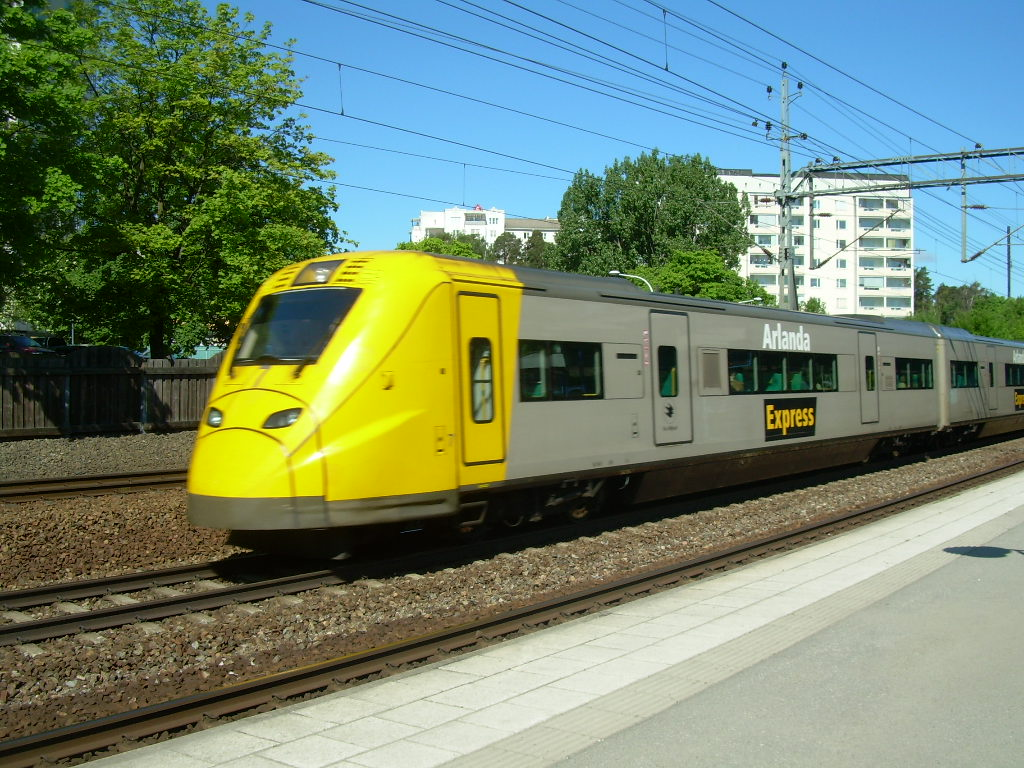
X3 train in June 2010

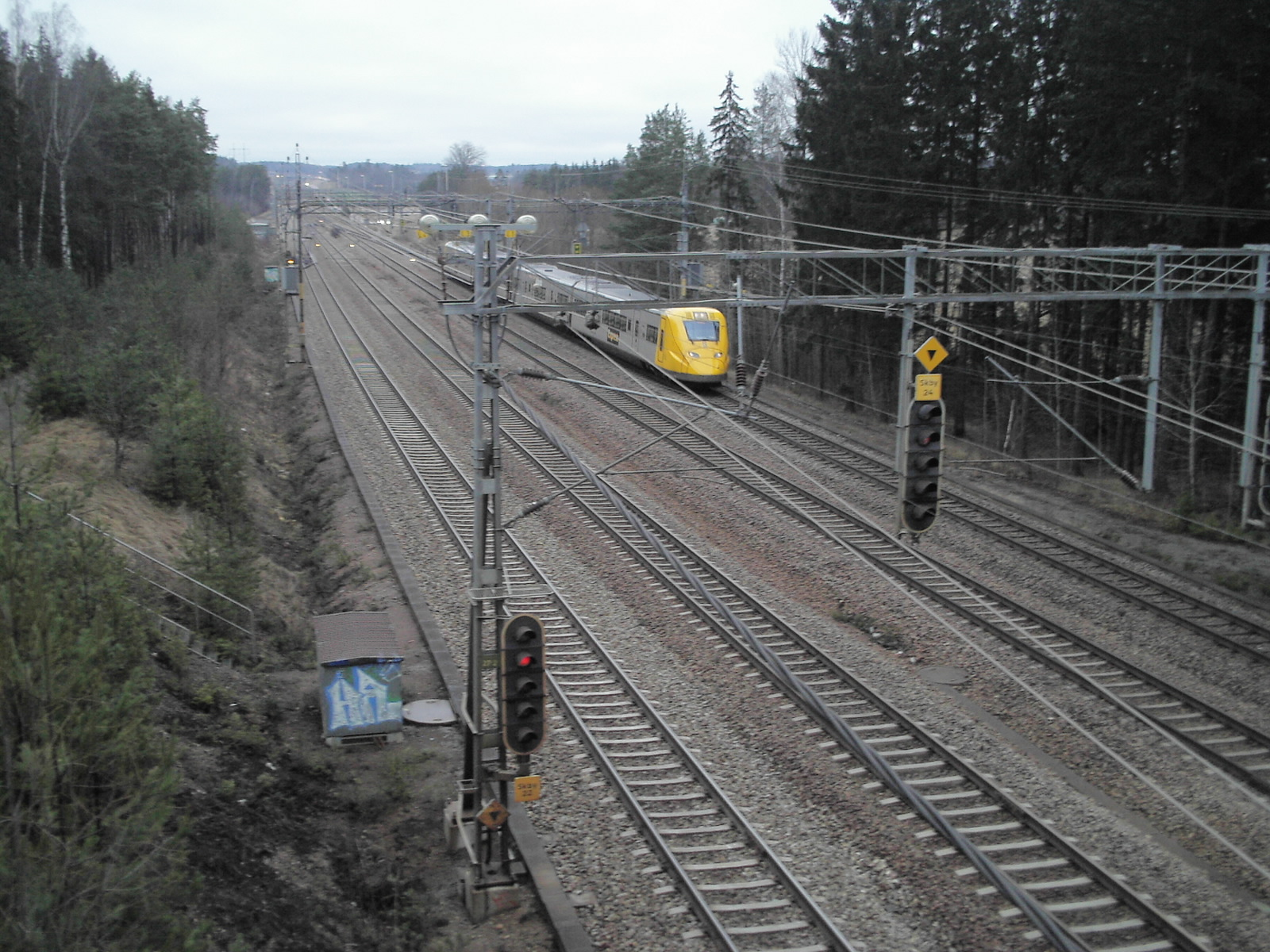
X3 train on the East Coast Line in February 2008

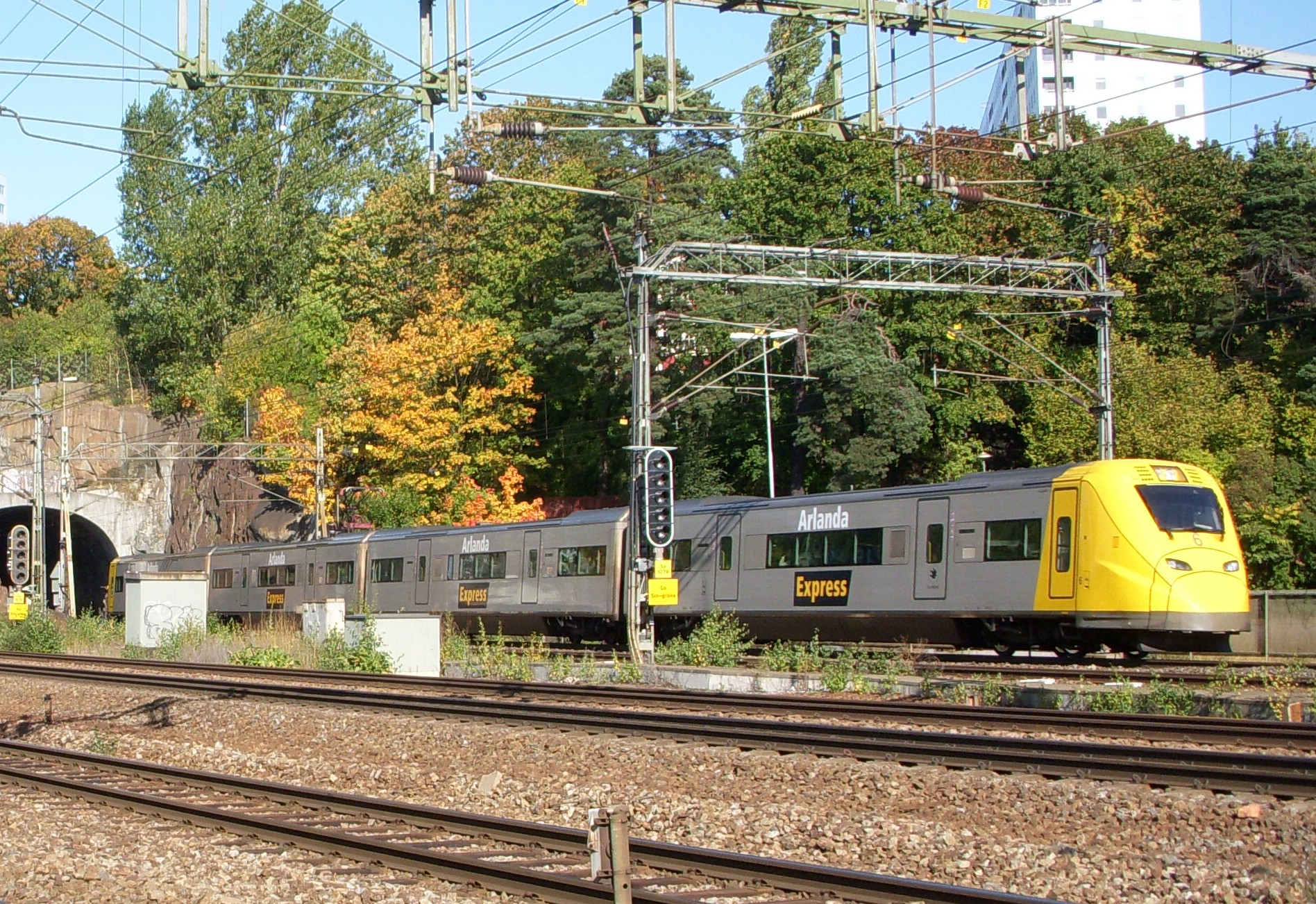
X3 on the East Coast Line in February 2009

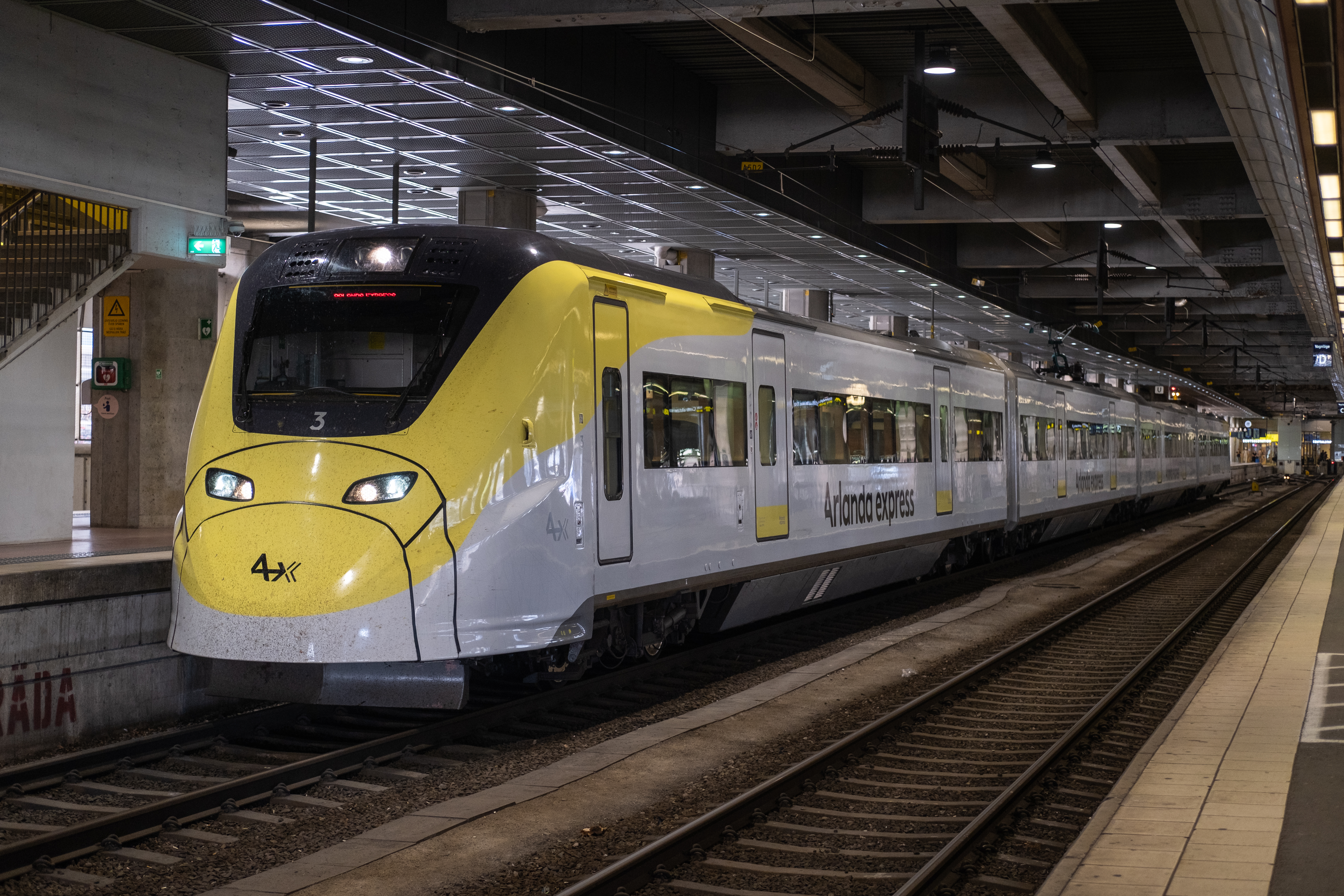
X3 on track 2 in Stockholm Central, June 2022.

The Arlanda Express connects the city center of Stockholm, at Stockholm Central, to Stockholm Arlanda Airport. At the airport, the train serves two stations: Arlanda South, which serves terminals 2, 3 and 4, and Arlanda North, which serves terminal 5. From Stockholm to Rosersberg, the train follows the East Coast Line, and from there to the airport, the Arlanda Line.

The train operates from three times an hour to six times per hour during rush hour. As of 2024, the standard price for a one-way ticket is SEK 340, although discounts are offered for children, students, seniors, on special travel days and for return trips under certain conditions. The Arlanda Express is operated by A-Train, which also built the Arlanda Line as part of a public–private partnership. The company holds an exclusive concession to operate any train service between Stockholm and the airport. In addition, the company is free to charge other train operators that use the Arlanda Line and stop at Arlanda Central Station.

== Rolling stock ==
The Arlanda Express is operated by seven four-carriage X3 electric multiple units. The units were built by Alstom's Washwood Heath plant in 1998 and 1999. The train consists of two powered end units and two non-powered center cars. The trains have a maximum speed of 200 km/h (125 mph) and a maximum power output of 2,240 kilowatts (3,000 hp). They are 93 metres (305 ft) long and weigh 187 tonnes (184 long tons; 206 short tons). Each car has two doors on each side, and the train has seating for 190 passengers. There is a baggage area beside each door, seating for people with a disability and a toilet in the middle of the train. The Arlanda Express' three stations have a special platform height that allows level access to the trains from the platforms. In 2006, the trains were renovated and received new interiors in three different color schemes, green, orange and blue, designed by the former Swedish tennis player Björn Borg's eponymous fashion label.

In 2025, an order for seven six-carriage Stadler FLIRT EMUs was placed to replace the X3 fleet.

== History ==
Plans for an airport rail link connecting the central business district of Stockholm with the airport were launched in the early 1980s. The goal was to reduce road congestion and emissions while allowing Arlanda to keep increasing passenger numbers. The Swedish Rail Administration made a specific plan in the late 1980s which involved the construction of a branch from the existing East Coast Line. This resulted in a project plan which was launched in 1990, which specifically suggested Rosersberg and Odensala as the intersections with the existing line. The political decision to build the line was taken in 1993. Estimates at the time projected a ridership of 5.1 million passengers per year by 2005.

The Swedish Rail Administration had proposed that the line was to be built with the government agency as owner and with either SJ or private railway companies as train operators. However, the Cabinet of Carl Bildt wanted private sector involvement in the construction and operation of the line. In 1993, the Government put in place a public tender to build and operate the line. In 1994, Arlanda Link Consortium was chosen, consisting of the Nordic Construction Company, SIAB, Vattenfall, GEC-Alsthom and Mowlem. A-Banan Projekt AB was established as a limited company in 1994 to oversee the project. The consortium established A-Train AB to be the project developer and then operate the Arlanda Express until 2040. The legal responsibility for the project was transferred from the consortium to A-Train in 1995. As part of the agreement, A-Train received from the Swedish Government 850 million Swedish krona (SEK) in a grant and SEK 1 billion in a loan to help finance the project. The company was also allowed to operate a shuttle service from Stockholm C to Arlanda and charge a non-discriminating fee for all other trains using the line.

Total investment costs for the project were SEK 6 billion, of which SEK 2 billion was financed through state grants to the Swedish Rail Administration who built the quadruple track along the East Coast Line. The public–private partnership part of the project involved two new tracks at Stockholm C and the Arlanda Line, costing SEK 4.1 billion. Of this, SEK 2.4 billion was financed by the state. In addition, the state held a financial guarantee to Nordea for the X3 trains, should A-Train fail to meets its financial obligations to the bank. A-Train was also granted an interest-free deferral on the payment of the fees at Stockholm C and Arlanda, costing the state SEK 90 million. Of A-Train's capital loan for SEK 2.2 billion, SEK 1.8 billion was borrowed from three state-owned financial institutions: the Swedish National Debt Office, the Swedish Export Credit Corporation and the Nordic Investment Bank. In addition, 20% of the share capital was secured through Vattenfall's equity in the company.

The Arlanda Line and the Arlanda Express started operations on 25 November 1999. After the construction was completed, the ownership of the infrastructure was transferred to A-Banan Projekt. However, A-Train is responsible for paying for all maintenance and operating costs of the line. In 2004, A-Train was bought by Macquarie Group, who paid SEK 70 million for the company, in addition to taking over debt worth SEK 330 million.

In 2004, the Swedish National Audit Office criticized the process of building and financing the Arlanda Line, and stated that the State had taken more financial risk than the Riksdag had been informed about. It also criticized the Government for giving additional financial support to A-Train in the form of guarantees without informing the Riksdag, and having an unclear management strategy. It also commented that the traffic forecasts during planning were incorrect. The original plans showed an economic benefit of SEK 4 billion. However, because A-Train is free to set its ticket prices as it wishes, the high prices resulted in too few passengers taking the Arlanda Line for it to be of economic benefit to the Swedish community, and the line failed to maximise its economic impact through reduced road congestion and emissions.

In a motion passed by the Riksdag on 7 October 2008, the Arlanda Line Agreement was unanimously criticized and characterized as the "worst possible agreement Arlanda could have". A-Train is free to set whatever fees its sees fit on the line, both regarding their own ticket prices on the Arlanda Express and what fees it charges other train operators. This framework had resulted in a significant rise in ticket prices and results in a low levels of public transport use for ground transportation to the airport.

The Swedish State holds an option to purchase the traffic rights from A-Train in 2010, which would eliminate the fees and allow other operators to run directly from the airport to the city center. As of 2008, the train had a 9% market share for employees and a 25% market share for passengers traveling to the airport. Commentators and politicians have stated that the business model results in a low utilization of the line because of the high ticket prices, which has caused the airport to not reach its targeted emission goals.

The CEO of A-Train, Per Thorstensson, stated that it would be a waste of tax payers' money to purchase the line in 2010, as the state would receive the line free of charge in 2040. Originally A-Train was required to accumulate capital of SEK 600 million before it could pay dividends, but this was changed to SEK 150 million in 2008, after an agreement was made with Arlandabanan Infrastructure.

In 2014, Macquarie sold A-Train to STC Pooled Fund, Sunsuper, and the State Administration of Foreign Exchange.

In 2025, Swedish investment firm EQT was announced to have acquired A-Train.

== Accidents and incidents ==
At 4:35 am on 27 May 2023, Arlanda Express train 7900 travelling from Stockholm to Arlanda with 69 people on board, including 67 passengers, derailed near the A-Train depot at Blackvreten, east of Märsta. The train was travelling at 178 km/h when a welding joint in the movable crossing of a switch ruptured due to welding defects and fatigue cracks. The second to the fourth carriages of the train derailed and came to a stop after about 900 m. One passenger was seriously injured. Following the accident, all rail services to Arlanda Airport were suspended until repairs could be made.

== See also ==
- History of rail transport in Sweden
- Public transport in Stockholm
- Rail transport in Sweden
