= Arlanda North Station =

Railway station in Sweden

Arlanda N
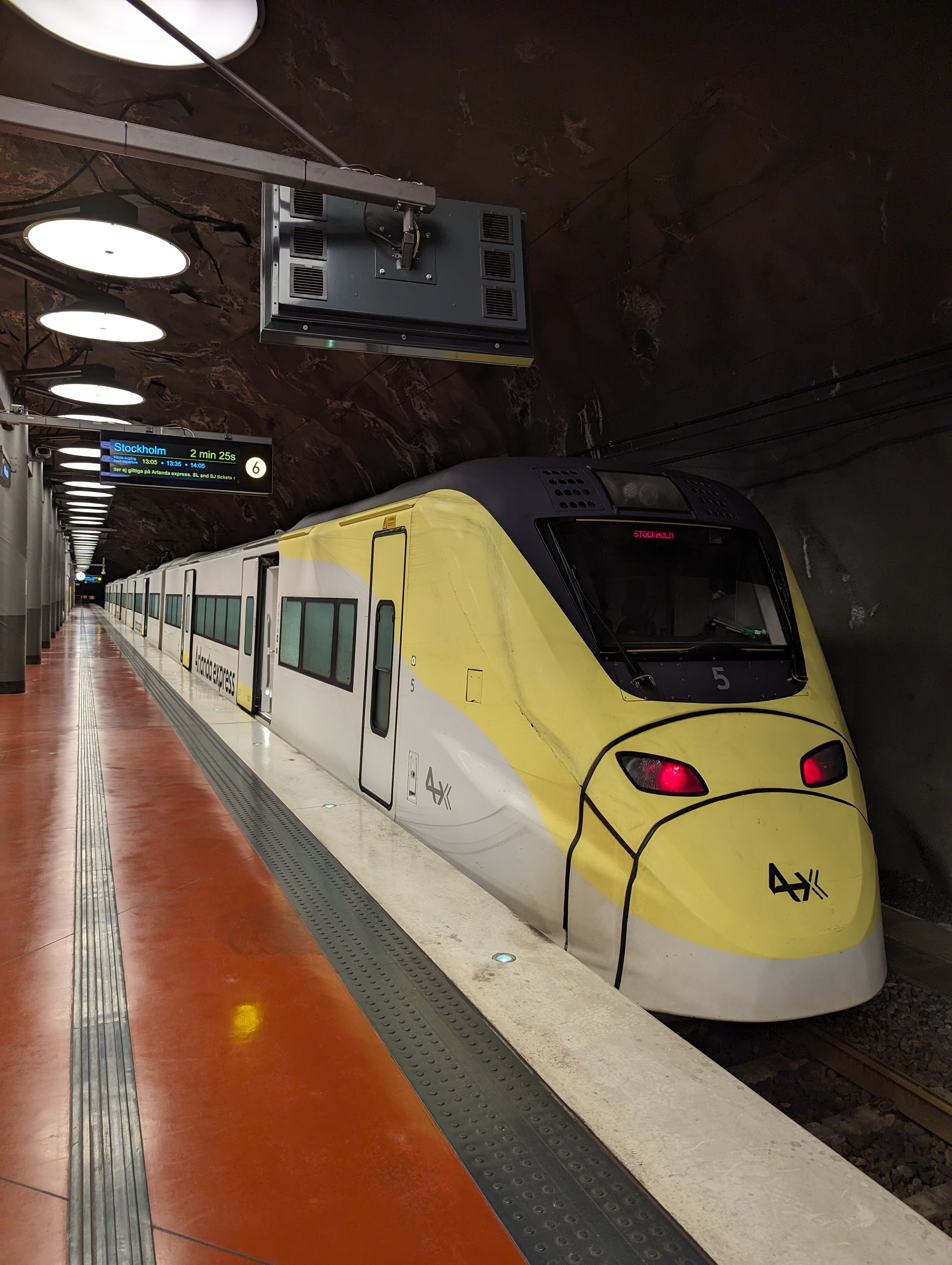
- Arlanda Express X3 train at the station

General information
- Coordinates: 59°39′05″N 17°55′50″E
- Owner: Arlanda Infrastructure
- Line: Arlanda Line
- Platforms: 1
- Tracks: 2

Construction
- Structure type: Underground

History
- Opened: 25 November 1999

Services
Preceding station	Regional trains	Following station
Arlanda S towards Stockholm C	Arlanda Express	Terminus
Location

Arlanda North Station (Swedish: Arlanda norra station) is a railway station on the Arlanda Line serving Stockholm-Arlanda Airport in Sweden. The station is one of two stations at the airport to be served by the Arlanda Express, the other being Arlanda South Station. The station is located at the northern end of a dedicated tunnel below the airport and is served by four or six trains per hour. The station serves Terminal 5 of the airport. The station is 39 kilometres (24 mi) from Stockholm Central Station.

== Service ==
The station is served exclusively by the Arlanda Express, a dedicated airport rail link which connects the airport to Stockholm Central Station. Other operators, including SJ and the SL commuter trains use Arlanda Central station. Arlanda Express normally operates four times every hour, but during rush hour this is increased to six times per hour. Travel time to Stockholm is 20 minutes.

The Arlanda Express is operated by A-Train, which is owned by EQT. The Arlanda Express operate using X3 high-speed trains.

== History ==
Plans for a railway line from central Stockholm to the airport started in the early 1980s. Policy-makers wanted to allow the airport to grow without increasing the road traffic to the airport, and decided to build a railway. The project involved building a branch from the existing East Coast Line from Rosersberg and back at Odensala.

Financing was secured by introducing Sweden's first public–private partnership, whereby a private consortium would be granted a 40-year permit to operate the line in exchange for all direct traffic and the right to collect usage fees from other train companies. The contract was won by A-Train in 1994, which started construction in 1995 and opened the line and station on 25 November 1999. This made Arlanda Airport the first airport in Sweden and the fourth in the Nordic countries to have an airport rail link, after Trondheim Airport and Oslo Airport in Norway, and Copenhagen Airport in Denmark.
