= Skellefteå Airport =

Skellefteå Airport Skellefteå flygplats

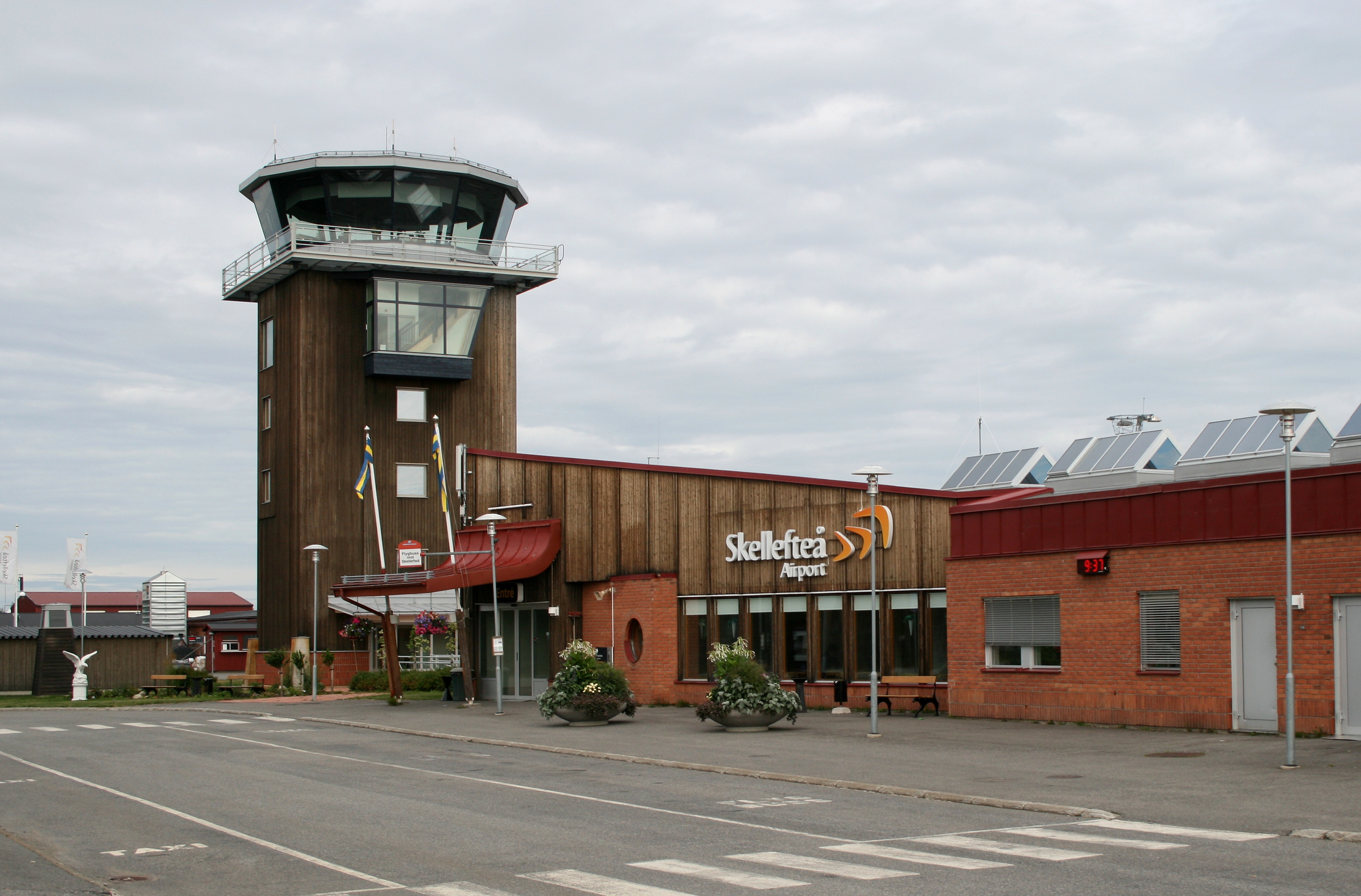
- IATA: SFT; ICAO: ESNS

Summary
- Airport type: Public
- Operator: Skellefteå Municipality
- Serves: Skellefteå, Sweden
- Elevation AMSL: 157 ft / 48 m
- Coordinates: 64°37′29″N 21°04′37″E
- Website: skellefteaairport.se

Map
- Location within Sweden

Runways
Direction	Length		Surface
Direction	ft	m	Surface
10/28	8,268	2,520	Asphalt

Statistics (2016)
- Passengers total: 280,926
- International passengers: 15,592
- Domestic passengers: 265,334
- Statistics: Swedish Transport Agency

Skellefteå Airport (IATA: SFT, ICAO: ESNS), is located about 17 km from Skellefteå, Västerbotten, Sweden. Skellefteå Airport is ranked as one of ten largest airports in Sweden in terms of domestic flights.

== Airlines and destinations ==
The following airlines operate regular scheduled and charter flights at Skellefteå Airport:

Airlines	Destinations
Norwegian Air Shuttle	Stockholm–Arlanda
Ryanair	Gdańsk
Scandinavian Airlines	Stockholm–Arlanda

== Statistics ==
Traffic by calendar year
Year	Passenger volume	Change	Domestic	Change	International	Change
2023	347,430					
2019	287,098	▼29.8%	265,446	▼30.8%	21,652	▼14.7%
2018	408,948	▼3.0%	383,572	▼3.3%	25,376	▲0.8%
2017	421,908	▲50.1%	396,739	▲49.5%	25,169	▲61.4%
2016	280,926	▼6.4%	265,334	▼0.3%	15,592	▼54.4%
2015	300,278		266,152		34,176	

== See also ==
- List of the largest airports in the Nordic countries
