= National Export Credits Guarantee Board (Sweden) =

Swedish government agency

Swedish National Export Credits Guarantee Board (Swedish: Exportkreditnämnden, EKN) is a Swedish government agency that answers to the Ministry for Foreign Affairs. The agency is located in Stockholm.

Its aim is to promote Swedish exports by issuing guarantees, functioning as insurances, by which the Government of Sweden assumes certain risks. The customers include export companies and banks.

== See also ==
- Government agencies in Sweden
- Swedish Export Credit Corporation
