= Stockholm Arlanda Airport =

Main airport serving Stockholm, Sweden

Stockholm Arlanda Airport Stockholm-Arlanda flygplats
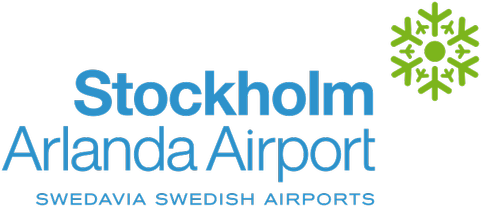

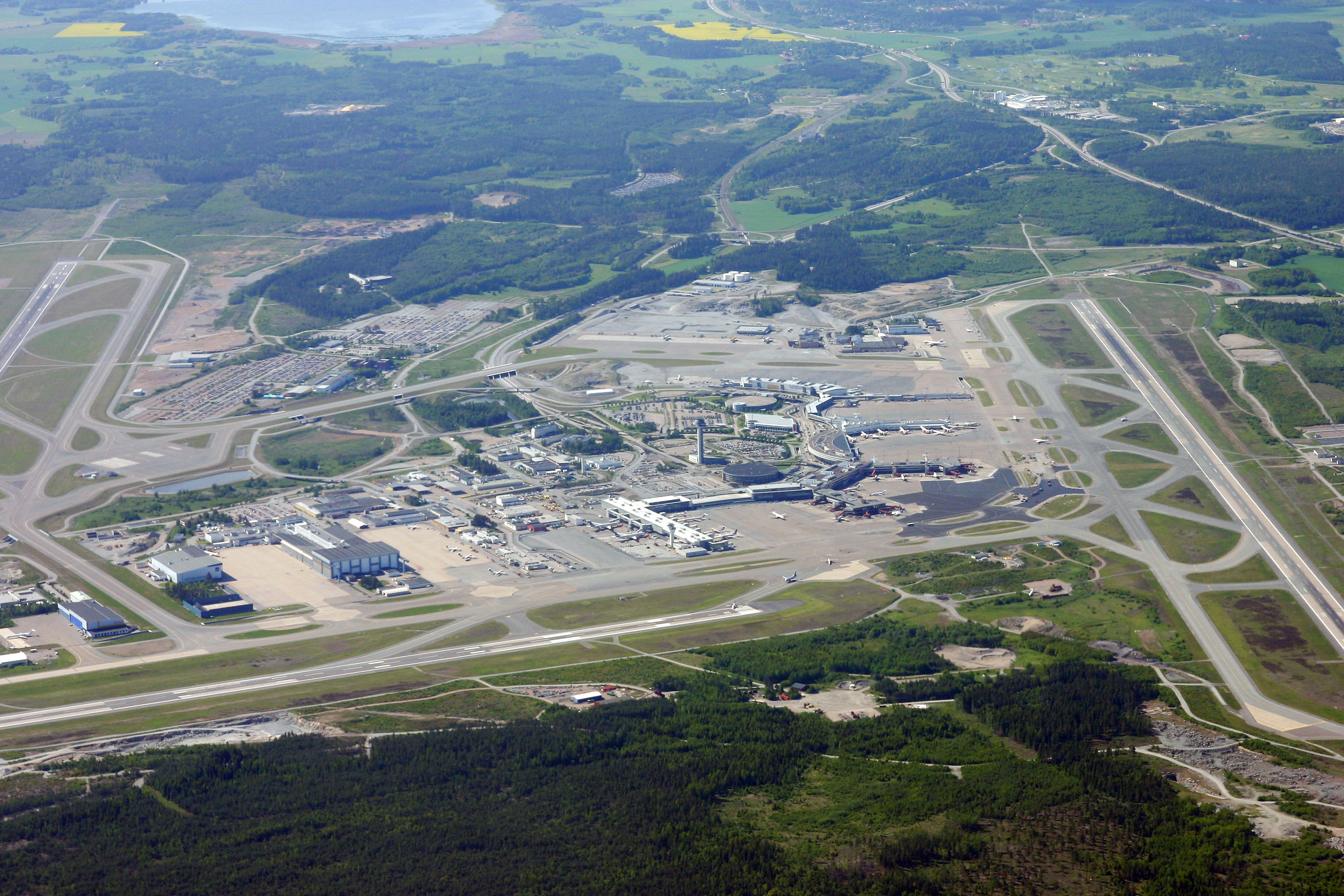
- IATA: ARN; ICAO: ESSA; WMO: 02484

Summary
- Airport type: Public
- Owner/Operator: Swedavia
- Serves: Metropolitan Stockholm
- Location: Sigtuna Municipality, Stockholm County, Sweden
- Opened: 1 April 1962; 64 years ago
- Hub for: Scandinavian Airlines, PopulAir
- Operating base for: Eurowings; Norwegian Air Sweden; Ryanair
- Elevation AMSL: 137 ft (42 m)
- Coordinates: 59°39′07″N 017°55′07″E
- Website: www.swedavia.com/arlanda

Maps
- Airport diagram

- Location within Stockholm County ARN/ESSA (Sweden)

Runways
Direction	Length		Surface
Direction	m	ft	Surface
01L/19R	3,301	10,830	Asphalt
01R/19L	2,500	8,202	Asphalt
08/26	2,500	8,202	Asphalt

Statistics (2025)
- Passengers: 24,294,277
- Passenger change 24–25: ▲7.0%
- Aircraft movements: 100,932
- Movements change 24–25: ▲6.0%
- Sources: Swedish AIP at LFVAIP; Passenger Traffic, ACI Europe

Stockholm Arlanda Airport (IATA: ARN, ICAO: ESSA), or simply Arlanda, is the main international airport serving Stockholm, the capital of Sweden. It is located in Sigtuna Municipality, 37 km (23 mi) north of Stockholm and nearly 40 km (25 mi) southeast of Uppsala. The airport is located within Stockholm County.

Arlanda is the largest airport in Sweden and the third-largest airport in the Nordic countries. The airport is the major gateway to international air travel for large parts of Sweden. Arlanda Airport was used by nearly 27 million passengers in 2017, with 21.2 million international passengers and 5.5 million domestic. The facility covers an expanse of about 2,500 hectares (9.7 sq mi) of airport property. Stockholm Arlanda serves as a major hub for Scandinavian Airlines and Norwegian Air Shuttle.

Stockholm Arlanda Airport is larger than Stockholm's other airport, Stockholm Bromma Airport, which is located 7 km (4.3 mi) northwest of central Stockholm, but can be used only by smaller aircraft. Two further airports outside of Stockholm County are also included in STO, the IATA airport code for the Stockholm Metropolitan Area: Stockholm Skavsta Airport and Stockholm Västerås Airport, both located around 100 kilometres (60 mi) away from the Swedish capital.

== History ==
=== Foundation and early years ===
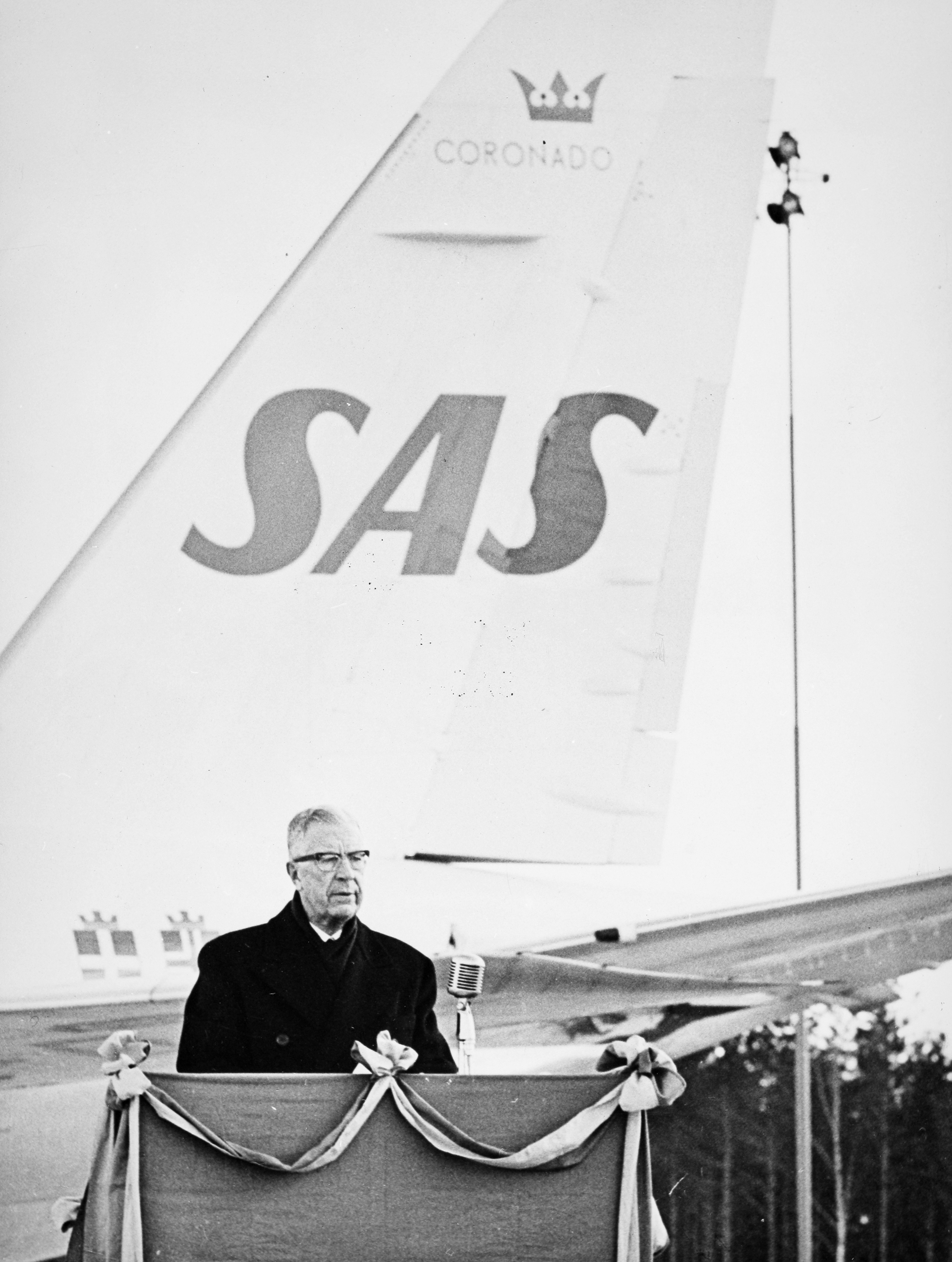
King Gustaf VI Adolf presiding over the opening ceremony on 1 April 1962

Stockholm Arlanda Airport was opened on 1 April 1962 by King Gustaf VI Adolf.

In 1983, the domestic traffic operated by Linjeflyg moved from Bromma to Arlanda, using the terminal now known as Terminal 4. In 1990, two new domestic terminals, Domestic 2 and 3, opened south of the first domestic terminal. In 1992, Terminal 2 was partly abandoned because of traffic decrease. It started to be used for international traffic the year after, and the main domestic and international terminals were renumbered to 4 and 5.

=== Early 2000s ===
The third runway was built between 1998 and 2002; however, a recession in 2002 delayed its opening until 2003. At that time, protests were raised by people living under its flight path in the municipality of Upplands Väsby. Traffic has recovered since and is now showing healthy increases, but the third runway is only used during peak hours for environmental reasons. In September 2010, the first Airbus A380 landed at the airport.

In early 2014, Swedavia announced plans for further expansions of the airport terminal complex, including the construction of an additional pier for Terminal 5 in order to better accommodate larger aircraft such as the Airbus A380 and Boeing 747-8 and address forecasts of rising passenger numbers. The plans were approved by the Environmental Court of Appeals in December 2014, and construction was scheduled to commence in the spring of 2015.

=== Development since 2020 ===
In the spring of 2020, most flights were cancelled due to the COVID-19 pandemic. SAS decided to fly only four domestic departures and four domestic arrivals from Arlanda, plus some international flights, after 6 April 2020 while Norwegian cancelled all flights from Arlanda except to Oslo. Terminal 2, 3 and 4 closed and terminal 5 handled all passengers during this period (March 2020 – October 2021) The passenger figures were 97.7% lower in April 2020 than in April 2019. The figured picked up later, but in early 2021 were still more than 80% less per month than 2019.

In the spring of 2022, passenger figures rose again to more normal levels. This caused capacity problems, especially in the security check, because most of its staff were fired due to the pandemic recession. Additionally followed with the time to find and get security approval for and educate new staff. Terminal 4 could not open because transfer between it and Terminal 5 required a security check, and the security check was congested already, so Terminal 5 became congested. Swedavia built a new pedestrian tunnel between the two terminals, bypassing the security check area. It opened together with Terminal 4 at the end of June 2022.

In September 2024, Braathens Regional Airlines announced it would discontinue its regular flight services and relocate its operations from Bromma Airport to Stockholm Arlanda Airport, as a contract operator for SAS. This decision is expected to cause Bromma to lose around 90% of its traffic, potentially hastening its closure, and leaving Arlanda as Stockholm County's only public airport.

In 2025, Terminal 4 was incorporated into Terminal 5, with its gates becoming part of Terminal 5. In September 2026, Terminal 3 was closed and its gate area began being incorporated into Terminal 2, reducing the number of passenger terminals from four to two.

== Terminals ==
Arlanda has two terminals: Terminal 2 and Terminal 5. The terminals have no separation of domestic and international flights, however gates are separated between Schengen and Non-Schengen departures. Two other areas of the airport previously operated as separate terminals, numbered 3 and 4; Terminal 4 has since been wholly incorporated into Terminal 5, while Terminal 3 is being incorporated into Terminal 2.

From 1992 to 2019, terminals 2 and 5 were used for international flights, and 3 and 4 for domestic flights. During the COVID-19 pandemic only Terminal 5 was used. In 2022, Terminals 4 and 5 were connected airside, enabling them to operate as a single terminal. In 2024, a separate remote gate facility, Gate Area A, was opened, accessed by shuttle bus from Terminal 5.

Arlanda has never had a Terminal 1. The designation was reserved for a potential terminal planned to be located just south of Terminal 2, which has never been built.

=== Terminal 2 ===
==== Gates 61–82 ====
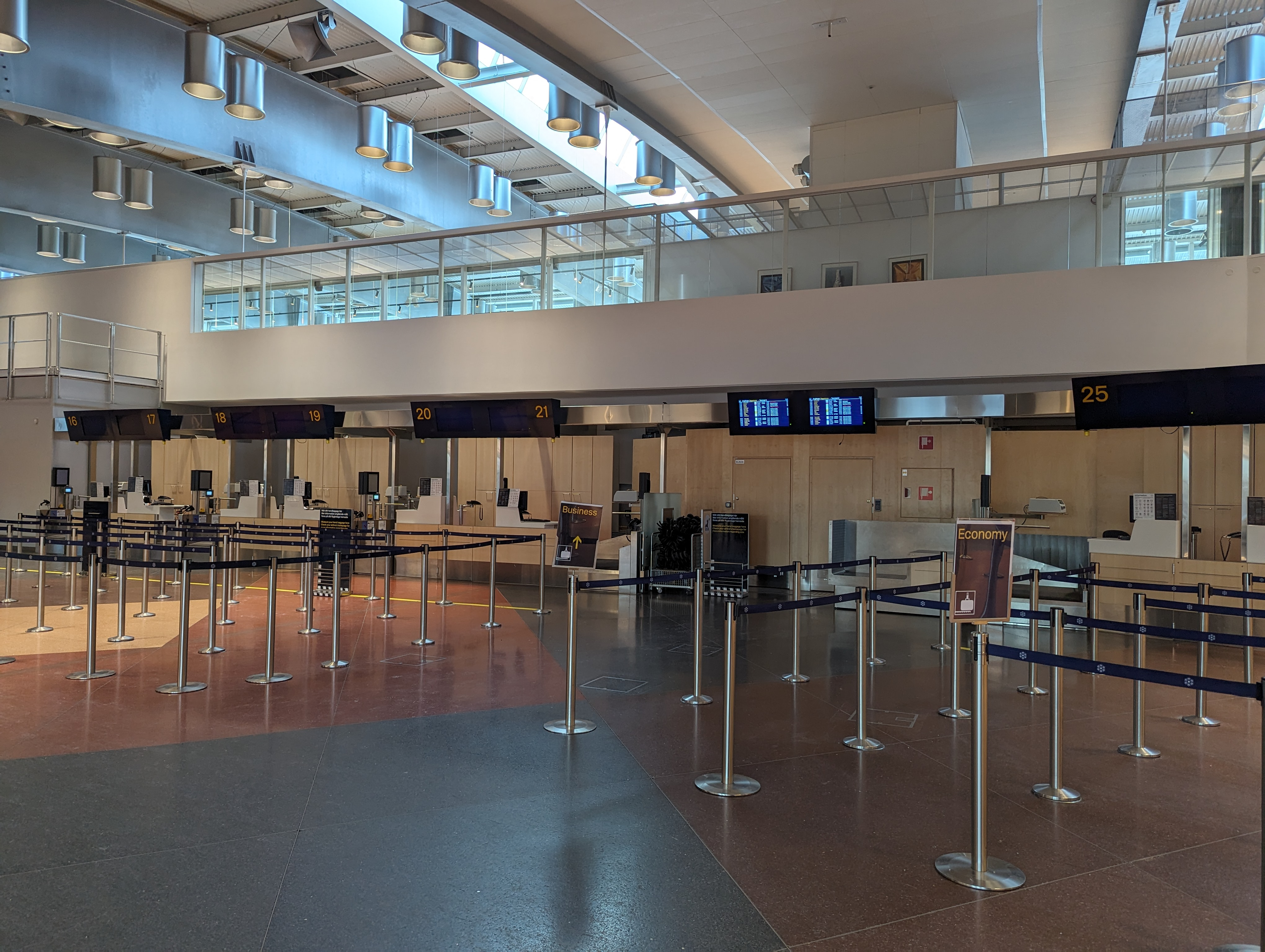
Terminal 2 check-in area

Terminal 2 (gates 61–82) was inaugurated on 12 December 1990, by Prince Bertil. Initially named Inrikes 2 ("Domestic 2"), it was designed for use by SAS as a domestic terminal, it features 8 aircraft parking stands with passenger bridges.

The terminal was constructed to facilitate short turnaround times, increased efficiency, and minimal walking distances for passengers. At its opening, it did not have security checks and was intended for passengers with hand luggage, allowing them to arrive just 10 minutes before departure. The design included double walk bridges suitable for MD-80 aircraft.

In 1992, SAS moved its domestic operations out of Terminal 2 due to a decrease in passenger traffic on domestic routes. The terminal then began accommodating other airlines, including Transwede Airways, for both domestic and international flights.

By the late 1990s, the terminal's capacity was insufficient to handle the growing passenger traffic. Significant updates were made in 2001 when Terminal 2 was reconfigured to handle exclusively international flights as part of preparations for Sweden's entry into the Schengen area. The terminal was adapted to meet new requirements, including the addition of security checks and a larger luggage claim area.

In 2013, Terminal 2 underwent a major refurbishment that expanded it by 2,500 square meters. The renovation added new transit areas, shops, and restaurants, as well as a new floor level with additional amenities such as restaurants and a lounge. Terminal 2 also features an express station for high-speed trains, Arlanda South Station, shared with terminals 3 and 4, but with its own dedicated escalator. There are buses between Terminal 2 and Terminal 5 without need for further security check.

- As of 29 May 2012, Norwegian relocated its international flights from Terminal 2 to Terminal 5 moving Air France and Czech Airlines to Terminal 2.
- In April 2013, British Airways and Finnair relocated to the newly renovated Terminal 2.
- Terminal 2 was closed due to COVID-19 between March 2020–October 2021. After reopening, Air France, Czech, Easyjet, KLM, Transavia and Vueling use Terminal 2.

==== Gates 51–59 ====
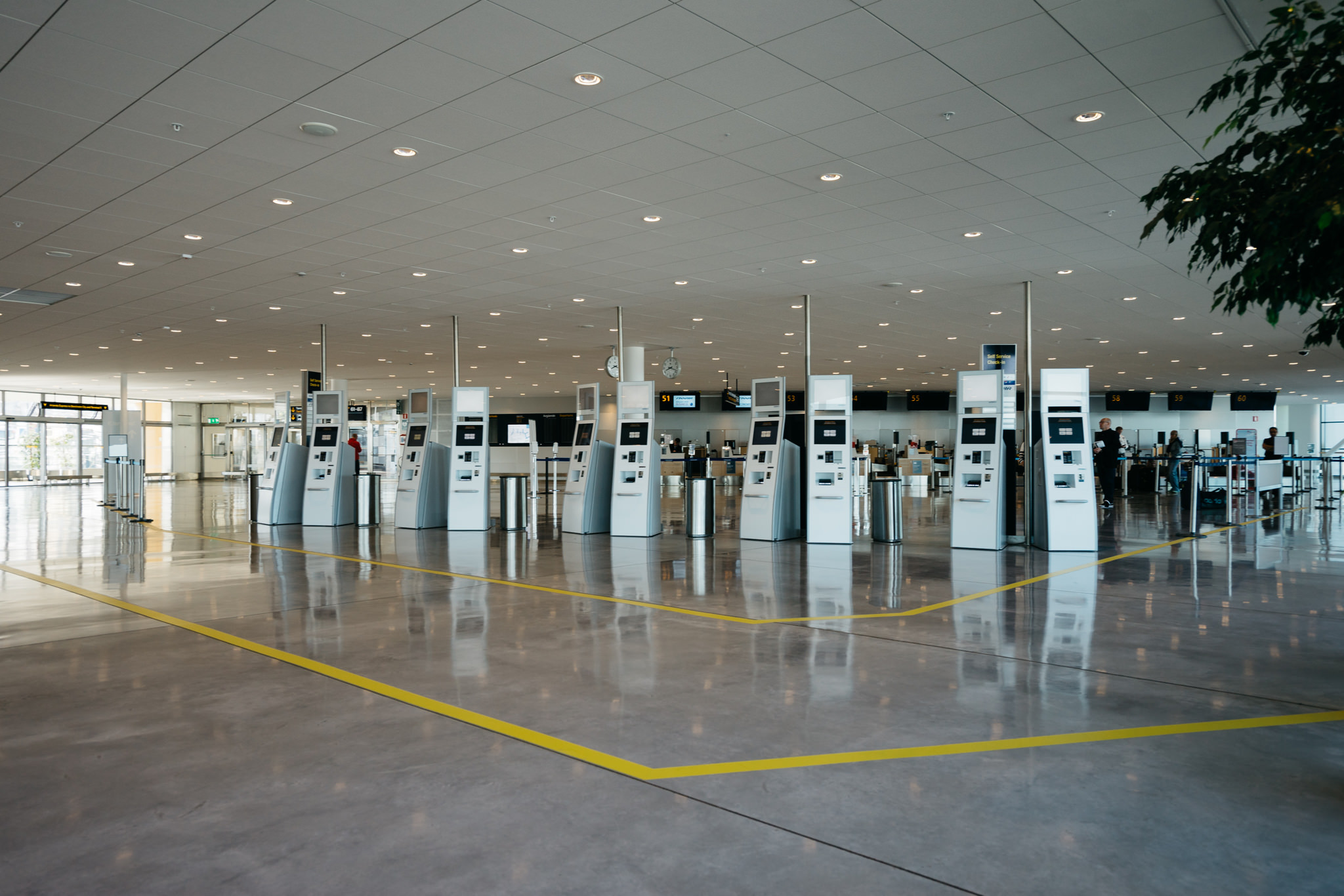
Check-in area used by Terminal 2

The area comprising gates 51–59 is a pier which formerly operated as Terminal 3. Terminal 3 opened in 1990 to serve regional domestic aircraft and was designed to handle regional flights within Sweden.

The terminal featured a café and a boarding process where passengers walked outdoors from the gates and boarded aircraft using airstairs. Access to Terminal 3 was through Terminal 2, requiring a 200-metre walk.

In early 2020, Terminal 3 was closed due to the COVID-19 pandemic. In October 2024, PopulAir, Jonair and Västflyg commenced operations from Terminal 3, marking its reopening.

In 2026, the Terminal 3 security control was closed and construction began on a new corridor connecting the former Terminal 3 area with Terminal 2. The gate area is being incorporated into Terminal 2 and is planned to reopen as part of Terminal 2 at the end of 2026.

=== Terminal 5 ===
Arlanda Terminal 5 airside

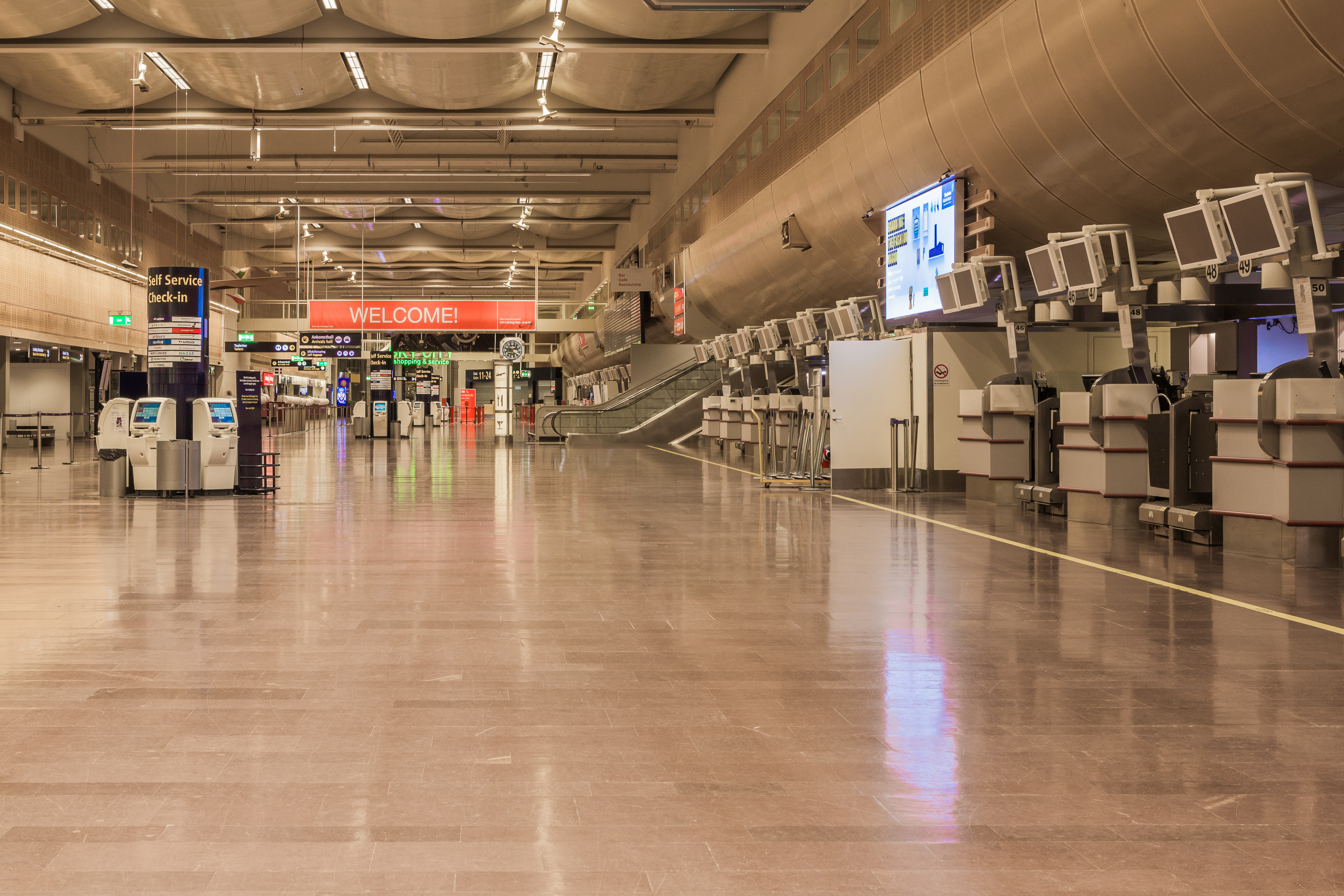
Terminal 5 check-in area

Terminal 5 is the largest and oldest of Arlanda's current passenger terminals. The terminal was opened as Arlanda International in 1976 by King Carl XVI Gustaf. Built to handle both scheduled and charter international flights, Terminal 5 has since undergone several expansions.

In 1992, the terminal was renamed from Arlanda International to its current designation as Terminal 5, and in 1999 Arlanda North Station was opened, providing a direct rail link to Stockholm Central Station with the Arlanda Express. In 2003, Terminal 5 underwent a significant expansion that included the addition of a third pier. This expansion was part of a broader redevelopment of Arlanda Airport, which also saw the opening of Runway 3 and a new air traffic control tower. The expanded facilities were inaugurated on 17 December 2003, by Infrastructure Minister Ulrika Messing.

Since 2020, Terminal 5 at Stockholm Arlanda Airport has served both domestic and international flights. It functions as a hub for Scandinavian Airlines and Norwegian Air Shuttle, and accommodates both Schengen and non-Schengen destinations. Due to the COVID-19 pandemic, all traffic at Arlanda Airport was moved to Terminal 5 between March 2020 and October 2021.

Since 2022, Terminal 5 has been connected to the former Terminal 4 (gates C30–C44) via an airside walkway, allowing them to operate as a single terminal. Terminal 5 now manages arrivals, customs, and baggage reclaim for the C gates. A new security control facility equipped with CT scanners opened in early summer 2023. Expansion works included a new airside concourse and duty-free store. The 11,000-square-metre commercial area began opening in autumn 2023 and was completed in June 2025, with more than 40 new shops, cafés and restaurants.

Future plans for Terminal 5 include the addition of Pier G by 2040, which aims to increase the terminal's capacity to accommodate up to 40 million passengers annually, up from 25 million in 2019.

==== D and E Gates ====
Terminal 5 (gates D11–D24 and E1–E10) comprises two piers, D and E. These were part of the original Terminal 5 facilities, which were equipped with aircraft parking stands with passenger bridges.

==== F Gates ====
The F gates (F26–F69) form the third pier of Terminal 5, which was added in the 2003 expansion. The expanded facilities were inaugurated on 17 December 2003, by Infrastructure Minister Ulrika Messing.

Since 2018, some F gates at Terminal 5 have been able to support larger aircraft models such as the Airbus A380.

==== C gates ====
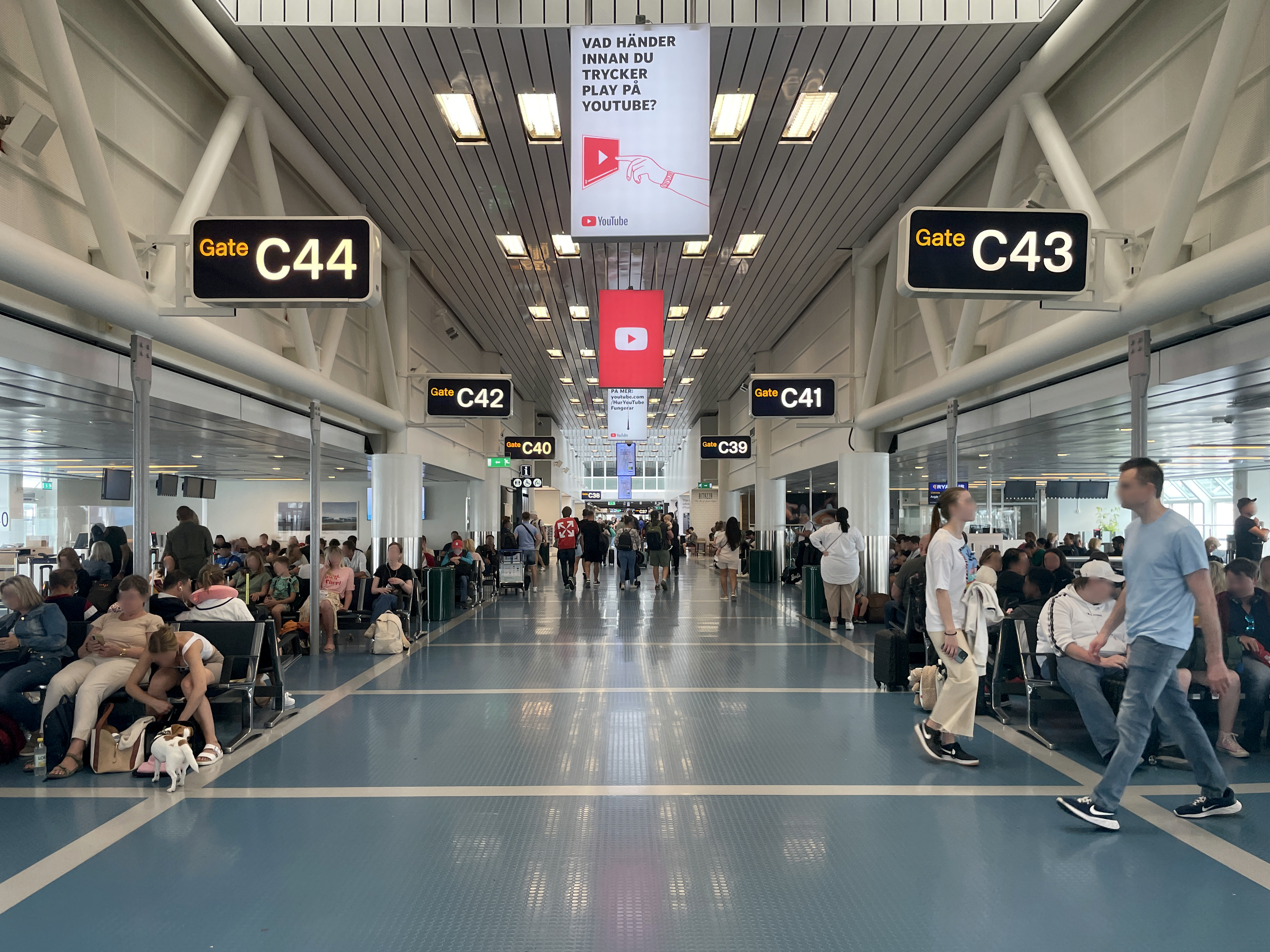
Pier C gates at Terminal 5

The C gates (C30–C44) were formerly operated as Terminal 4. The terminal was inaugurated in 1983 by King Carl XVI Gustaf and Queen Silvia. Initially named Inrikes 1 ("Domestic 1"), it was designed to handle domestic flights. The terminal took the form of a single pier and featured 14 aircraft parking stands with passenger bridges.

In 1984, Linjeflyg and Scandinavian Airlines (SAS) relocated all operations from Stockholm Bromma Airport to the new terminal at Arlanda to consolidate their domestic and international departures. Due to increasing passenger numbers, the terminal soon became too small. To address this, Inrikes 2 (now Terminal 2) was established in 1990 for SAS, which moved its domestic flights from Inrikes 1 to the new terminal.

Due to the 1990–1994 Swedish financial crisis, SAS returned to Terminal 4 in 1992, and the two carriers once again shared the terminal. In the same year, Inrikes 1 was renamed Terminal 4. From 1999, Terminal 4 was served by Arlanda South Station, a station for the Arlanda Express, connecting the terminal with Stockholm Central Station and Arlanda North Station at Terminal 5. In 2006, Terminal 4 underwent a major renovation, the first significant update since its construction in 1983.

The terminal closed in spring 2020 due to the COVID-19 pandemic and reopened in June 2022. During its closure, an airside walkway was constructed beneath Sky City, linking the Terminal 4 gate area with Terminal 5 and allowing the two areas to operate as a single terminal.

In October 2025, Swedavia closed the remaining passenger check-in, baggage handling and security control facilities in Terminal 4 and transferred these functions to Terminal 5. The C30–C44 gate area is now part of Terminal 5 and handles both domestic and international traffic. Passengers departing from the C gates check in and pass through security in Terminal 5 before proceeding to the gates via the connecting walkway.

==== Gate Area A ====
Gate area A

Gate Area A is a remote gate building with five gates. It was built in 2024 to provide additional gates while other aircraft parking areas are closed for renovation. Passengers departing from Gate Area A check in and pass through security at Terminal 5 before taking a shuttle bus from Gate F31.

=== Sky City ===
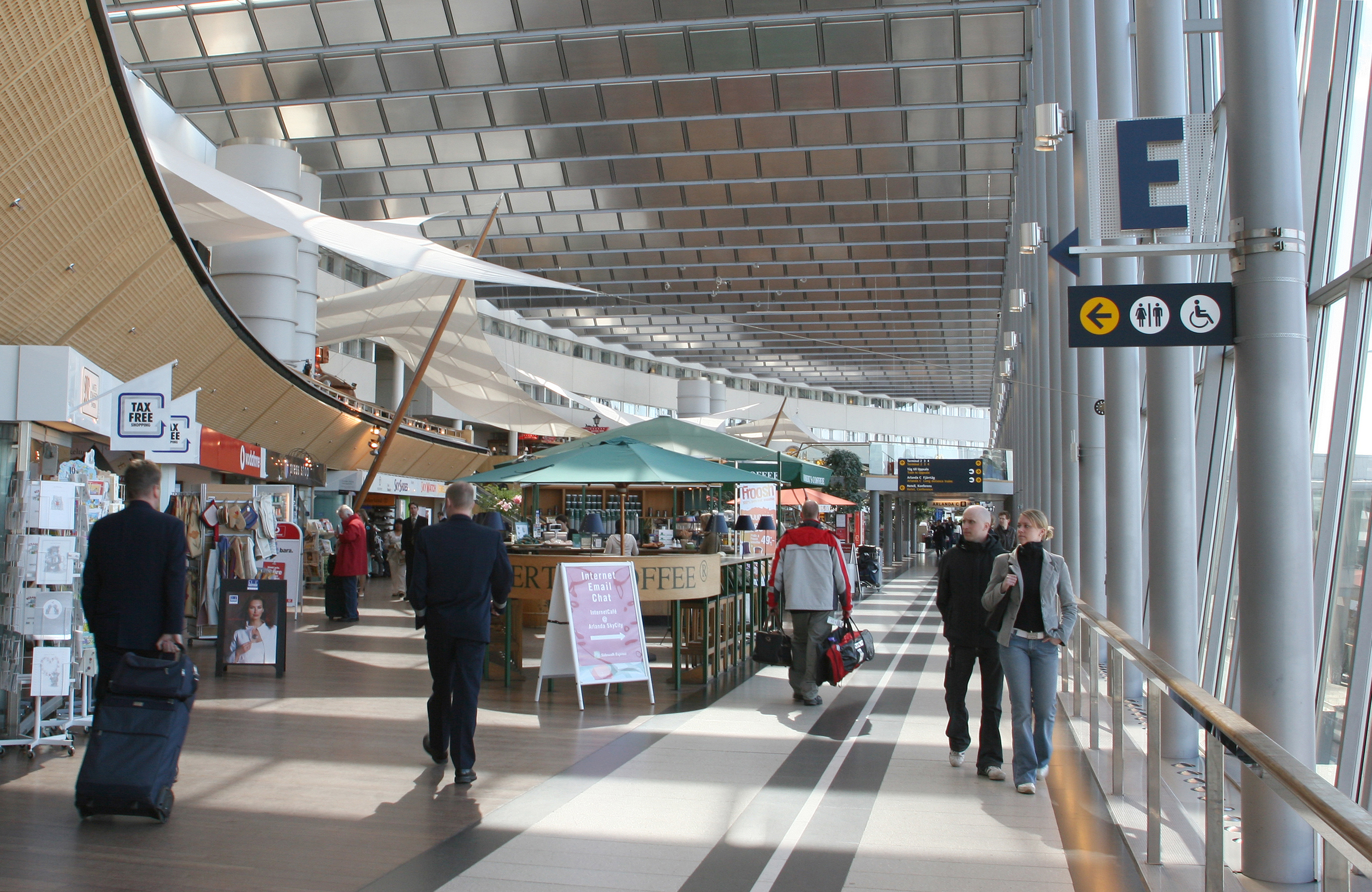
Sky City

In addition to the terminals, the airport features a concourse area called Sky City, located between Terminals 4 and 5. This area includes shopping and restaurant facilities, along with Arlanda Central Station below it. Sky City is situated landside, outside the security check area, and serves both passengers and visitors. Sky City also offers hotels connected to the terminals, located outside the security and passport check areas.

== Operations ==
=== Runways ===
Arlanda has three runways: Runway 1 (01L/19R), Runway 2 (08/26) and Runway 3 (01R/19L). Runway 1 is 3,301 m (10,830 ft) long and can handle take-offs and landings of the heaviest aircraft in use today. Runways 2 and 3 are 2,500 m (8,202 ft) long. As indicated, runways 1 and 3 are parallel runways that can be operated independently of one another. Runways 1 and 3 are equipped with CAT III systems for instrument landings. The airport can handle simultaneous take offs and landings using runways 1 and 3 at the same time. Simultaneous aircraft takeoffs and landings can be performed in instrument meteorological conditions (IMC). Runway 3 (01R/19L) is reached from the main terminal area via taxiway bridges constructed to be able to handle the heaviest and largest aircraft in traffic, although its length practically limits this. Since runway 3 (01R/19L) is located at a distance from the terminals, a deicing area is placed close to the runway to avoid long waits between deicing and take off in winter conditions. Another deicing area is located in connection with the southern ramp area close to the take off positions at runway 01L. There are high speed taxiway exits from all runways, except runway 08, to enable aircraft to exit the runways quickly after landing. That increases runway capacity during rush hours. Use of parallel taxiways around the terminal area separates arriving and departing traffic. Arlanda can handle all aircraft types in service including the Airbus A380.

=== Cargo facilities ===
Stockholm Arlanda has extensive cargo flight activity. There is a cargo area with cargo terminals and cargo transit facilities in the southern part of the airport area. The cargo area is labeled "Cargo City" with warehouses operated by Cargo Center, DHL, Swedish postal service (Posten) and Spirit Air Cargo. A large part of mail and express parcels from Sweden is handled through the facilities at the airport. SAS Cargo has its cargo operation east of the passenger terminals close to the SAS hangars.

Dedicated scheduled cargo flights are operated by Korean Air Cargo with Boeing 747 cargo aircraft, as well as Lufthansa Cargo and Turkish Airlines. DHL, FedEx and UPS operate express freight services at the airport. West Air Sweden and PopulAir operate shorter cargo sectors. A number of airlines operate ad hoc cargo flights with various equipment. Outsize cargo is frequently hauled with the Antonov An-124 and similar cargo planes. TNT had their operations at Arlanda but have since moved to Västerås Airport.

=== Aircraft hangars and maintenance facilities ===
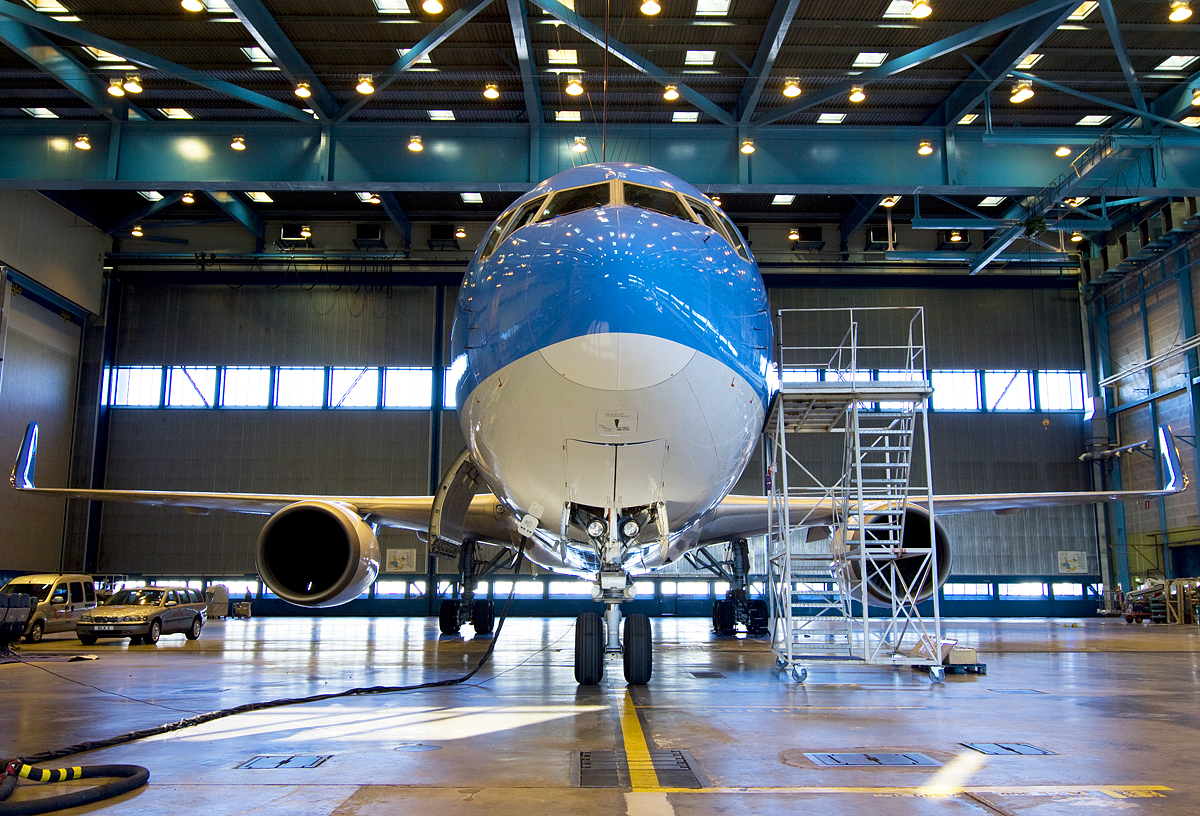
Boeing 767-300ER in TUI fly Nordic hangar at Arlanda

SAS Technical Services, TUI fly Nordic and Priority Aero Maintenance have large aircraft hangars and maintenance facilities at the airport. SAS Technical Services is headquartered at Arlanda and has hangar facilities suitable for widebody aircraft up to the size of Boeing 747-400s. The first part of the hangar complex was built to handle SAS' fleet of DC-8s. There are a number of positions on each side of the building initially built to handle the type. The hangar space are now used mostly for Boeing 737s and A320s. The Boeing 747 hangar was inaugurated at the time when Scandinavian Airlines received their first Boeing 747s in the early 1970s. It is large enough to handle a Boeing 747 and two 737 sized airplanes at the same time. The offices of SAS Technical Services are situated in connection with the hangars. In the early days of the airport these hangars provided heavy maintenance for members of the KSSU group, which included KLM, SAS, Swissair and UTA. A number of other airlines, such as Thai Airways International, also maintained their aircraft in those hangars. Now the main user is Scandinavian Airlines. TUI fly Nordic has a hangar able to handle their largest aircraft, the Boeing 787-9. Priority Aero Maintenance has its facilities in the eastern part of the airport. They provide heavy aircraft maintenance for a number of aircraft including MD-80, a common type to be overhauled by the company.

There is also a hangar in the southern part of the airport, built by the former Swedish domestic airline Linjeflyg. It is used mainly by regional aircraft.

Helicopter hangars and maintenance facilities are found at the very eastern part of the airport operated by Patria Helicopters.

=== Other facilities ===
Swedavia, the Swedish airport management company, has its head office in the airport control tower facility. The company Sollentuna Cabin Interiors has its head office in Hangar 4 at Arlanda.

Oxford Aviation Academy has a flight simulator centre for some of the most common airliners of today (like Boeing 737) at Arlanda. Arlanda has hangars and aircraft maintenance facilities operated by SAS Scandinavian Airlines and Priority Aero Maintenance. TUI fly Nordic based at the airport also has a large hangar for widebody jets. There is also a helicopter repair facility operated by Patria Helicopters. There are four hotels at the airport (Clarion Hotel Arlanda Airport, Radisson Blu Arlandia Hotel, Radisson Blu SkyCity Hotel and Rest and Fly); in addition there are several hotels nearby with transfer buses.

== Airlines and destinations ==
=== Passenger ===
Airlines	Destinations
Aegean Airlines	Athens
Air Canada	Seasonal: Toronto–Pearson
Air China	Beijing–Capital
Air France	Paris–Charles de Gaulle
Air Serbia	Belgrade
airBaltic	Riga
AJet	Istanbul–Sabiha Gökçen; Seasonal: Bodrum
All Nippon Airways	Tokyo–Haneda
Animawings	Bucharest–Otopeni
Austrian Airlines	Vienna
British Airways	London–Heathrow
Brussels Airlines	Brussels
China Eastern Airlines	Shanghai–Pudong
Condor	Frankfurt (begins 13 May 2027)
Croatia Airlines	Zagreb; Seasonal: Split
Delta Air Lines	Seasonal: New York–JFK
easyJet	Geneva
EgyptAir	Cairo (resumes 18 December 2026)
Emirates	Dubai–International
Ethiopian Airlines	Addis Ababa, Oslo
Eurowings	Beirut, Berlin, Düsseldorf, Hamburg, Prague, Stuttgart; Seasonal: Cologne/Bonn, Hannover, Salzburg; Seasonal charter: Preveza/Lefkada, Turin
Finnair	Bergen, Helsinki
Iberia	Madrid
Icelandair	Reykjavík–Keflavík
Jonair	Hagfors, Mora, Sveg, Torsby
KLM	Amsterdam
LOT Polish Airlines	Warsaw–Chopin
Lufthansa	Frankfurt, Munich
Luxair	Luxembourg
Nile Air	Cairo
Norse Atlantic Airways	Seasonal: Bangkok–Suvarnabhumi, Phuket
Norwegian Air Shuttle	Alicante, Amsterdam, Antalya, Barcelona, Berlin, Copenhagen, Edinburgh, Faro, Gran Canaria, Hamburg, Helsinki, Kiruna, Larnaca, Lisbon, London–Gatwick, Luleå, Málaga, Marrakesh, Milan–Malpensa, Nice, Oslo, Paris–Charles de Gaulle, Prague, Riga, Rome–Fiumicino, Skellefteå, Umeå, Vilnius; Seasonal: Agadir, Athens, Bari, Basel, Bastia, Bergen, Bilbao, Bucharest–Otopeni, Budapest, Burgas, Catania, Chania, Dubai–Al Maktoum, Dubrovnik, Hurghada, Kraków, Lyon, Manchester, Munich, Montpellier, Olbia, Palermo, Palma de Mallorca, Pisa, Porto, Pristina, Pula, Rhodes, Salzburg, Sharm El Sheikh, Split, Tenerife–South, Thessaloniki, Venice, Visby
Nouvelair	Seasonal: Tunis
Pegasus Airlines	Antalya, Istanbul–Sabiha Gökçen; Seasonal: Ankara
PopulAir	Arvidsjaur, Gällivare, Hemavan, Kramfors, Lycksele, Mariehamn, Örnsköldsvik, Vilhelmina
Royal Jordanian	Amman–Queen Alia
Ryanair	Alicante, Banja Luka, Barcelona, Beauvais, Bergamo, Budapest, Cagliari, Charleroi, Cologne/Bonn, Dublin, Gdańsk, Karlsruhe/Baden-Baden, Kaunas, Kraków, London–Stansted, Málaga, Malta, Marrakesh, Marseille, Porto, Poznań,, Rabat,, Riga, Rome–Fiumicino, Sarajevo, Tallinn, Thessaloniki, Tirana, Treviso, Vienna, Warsaw–Modlin; Seasonal: Béziers, Birmingham, Bologna, Brindisi, Chania, Corfu, Dubrovnik, Palma de Mallorca, Pisa, Rhodes, Rijeka, Sarajevo, Trapani, Trieste, Turin, Valencia, Visby, Wrocław, Zadar, Zakynthos
Scandinavian Airlines	Alicante, Amsterdam, Ängelholm, Barcelona, Berlin, Billund, Brussels, Copenhagen, Dublin, Faro, Geneva, Gothenburg, Halmstad, Hamburg, Helsinki Kalmar, Kiruna, London–Heathrow, Luleå, Madrid, Málaga, Malmö, Manchester, Milan–Linate, Milan–Malpensa, Oslo, Östersund, Palma de Mallorca, Ronneby, Skellefteå, Sundsvall, Tallinn, Thessaloniki, Tromsø, Trondheim, Turku, Umeå, Vaasa, Vilnius, Visby, Zürich; Seasonal: Antalya, Bodø, Florence, Gran Canaria, Ibiza, Innsbruck, Larnaca, Naples, Palermo, Sälen-Trysil, Seville, Tenerife–South, Tirana; Seasonal charter: Corfu, Ioannina, Karpathos, Kos, Lemnos, Mytilene, Preveza/Lefkada, Samos, Santorini, Skiathos, Volos
Sola Air	Karlstad
Sunclass Airlines	Seasonal charter: Gazipaşa
SunExpress	Seasonal: Ankara, Antalya, İzmir
Swiss International Air Lines	Geneva, Zürich
TAP Air Portugal	Lisbon
Thai Airways International	Bangkok–Suvarnabhumi
Transavia	Paris–Orly; Seasonal: Lyon, Marseille
TUI fly Nordic	Seasonal charter: Karpathos, Punta Cana
Turkish Airlines	Istanbul
Vueling	Barcelona
Wizz Air	Bucharest–Băneasa, Budapest, Gdańsk, Skopje, Tirana

=== Cargo ===
Airlines	Destinations
FedEx Express	Paris–Charles de Gaulle
Korean Air Cargo	Seoul–Incheon
Turkish Cargo	Istanbul
UPS Airlines	Cologne/Bonn
West Air Sweden	Gothenburg, Sundsvall

== Statistics ==
=== Traffic figures ===
Passenger traffic and landings statistics Stockholm Arlanda Airport
Year	Domestic	Change	International	Change	Total	Change	Landings	Change
2025	4,112,244	▲28,9%	20,182,033	▲3,2%	24,294,277	▲6.8%	98,665	▲6.1%
2024	3,190,996	▼10%	19,546,978	▲7%	22,737,974	▲4.2%	92,992	▲1.1%
2023	3,564,358	▲13.0%	18,254,222	▲19.5%	21,818,580	▲18.4%	92,013	▲11.2%
2022	3,154,113	▲87.5%	15,273,173	▲162.8%	18,427,286	▲145.9%	82,730	▲89.3%
2021	1,682,049	▲5.3%	5,812,716	▲17.7%	7,494,765	▲14.7%	43,710	▲5.1%
2020	1,597,235	▼67.1%	4,938,194	▼76.3%	6,535,429	▼74.5%	41,603	▼63.8%
2019	4,849,031	▼8.3%	20,793,592	▼3.5%	25,642,623	▼4.5%	114,801	▼4.4%
2018	5,289,246	▼3.4%	21,557,474	▲1.9%	26,846,720	▲0.8%	120,059	▼2.2%
2017	5,476,136	▲0.5%	21,165,898	▲9.0%	26,642,034	▲8.0%	122,697	▲6.0%
2016	5,277,686	▲7.0%	19,424,733	▲7.0%	24,702,419	▲4.0%	115,631	▲4.0%
2015	5,081,908	▼0.5%	18,060,628	▲4.2%	23,142,536	▲3.1%	112,987	▲0.3%
2014	5,105,571	▲4.3%	17,338,211	▲9.7%	22,443,782	▲8.5%	112,648	▲2.7%
2013	4,870,328	▲1.0%	15,811,068	▲7.0%	20,681,396	▲5.0%	109,837	▲5.0%
2012	4,802,546	▲1.4%	14,839,483	▲3.5%	19,642,029	▲3.0%	104,930	▼1.4%
2011	4,737,758	▲17.9%	14,334,961	▲10.8%	19,072,719	▲12.4%	106,428	▲11.5%
2010	4,019,292	▲1.8%	12,943,124	▲6.8%	16,962,416	▲5.6%	95,434	▼0.9%
2009	3,949,253	▼18.7%	12,114,747	▼8.8%	16,064,000	▼11.4%	96,279	▼13.9%
2008	4,854,810	▼3.8%	13,281,295	▲3.2%	18,136,105	▲1.2%	111,450	▲2.0%
2007	5,048,736	▼5.3%	12,863,722	▲5.4%	17,912,458	▲2.1%	109,275	▼3.8%
2006	5,331,916	▼7.2%	12,207,474	▲7.5%	17,539,390	▲2.6%	113,565	▼3.0%
2005	5,744,667	▲3.3%	11,356,811	▲6.2%	17,101,478	▲5.2%	117,095	▼4.6%
2004	5,559,801	▲3.2%	10,694,071	▲10.0%	16,253,872	▲7.5%	122,680	▲6.0%
2003	5,388,364	▼10.6%	9,725,141	▼6.5%	15,113,505	▼8.0%	115,762	▼5.8%
2002	6,029,712	▼9.9%	10,401,495	▼8.8%	16,431,207	▼9.2%	122,852	▼11.1%
2001	6,695,340	▼1.0%	11,401,250	▼0.9%	18,096,590	▼0.9%	138,244	▼1.0%
2000	6,760,127	▲5.2%	11,503,799	▲7.5%	18,263,926	▲6.6%	139,705	▲1.2%
1999	6,423,639	▲5.1%	10,704,910	▲6.7%	17,128,549	▲6.1%	138,081	▲3.2%
1998	6,111,993	▲6.6%	10,035,978	▲8.8%	16,147,971	▲8.0%	133,861	▲3.8%
1997	5,731,403	▲2.5%	9,221,675	▲10.6%	14,953,078	▲7.3%	128,985	▲8.2%
1996	5,590,446		8,341,427		13,931,873		119,261	

Busiest European routes to and from Stockholm Arlanda Airport (2024)
Rank	Airport	Passengers handled	% change 2023/24
1	London (Note: Includes flights to/from London–Gatwick, London–Heathrow and London–Stansted)	1,347,470	▼1.2
2	Copenhagen	1,288,303	▲9.1
3	Oslo	1,100,208	▲1.0
4	Helsinki	1,040,893	▲1.8
5	Amsterdam	894,029	▲14.9
6	Paris (Note: Includes flights to/from Paris–Beauvais, Paris–Charles de Gaulle and Paris–Orly)	659,278	▲1.0
7	Málaga	578,521	▲9.4
8	Frankfurt	520,620	▲1.3
9	Munich	517,457	▲13.0
10	Istanbul (Note: Includes flights to/from Istanbul Airport and Istanbul–Sabiha Gökçen)	507,538	▲9.2
11	Vienna	445,013	▲8.8
12	Alicante	414,155	▲8.3
13	Brussels (Note: Includes flights to/from Brussels Airport and Brussels–Charleroi)	366,013	▲56.3
14	Zurich	363,800	▼5.9
15	Gdańsk	345,024	▲52.7
16	Palma de Mallorca	328,256	▲15.8
17	Barcelona	326,142	▼4.7
18	Riga	323,620	▲24.3
19	Tallinn	321,731	▲36.7
20	Berlin	317,990	▼6.9

Busiest intercontinental routes to and from Stockholm Arlanda Airport (2024)
Rank	Airport	Passengers handled	% change 2023/24
1	New York (Note: Includes flights to/from New York–JFK and Newark)	256,594	▼3.7
2	Dubai	222,257	▲3.4
3	Doha	213,149	▼5.9
4	Bangkok	191,277	▼3.6
5	Beijing	141,020	▲136.6

Busiest domestic routes to and from Stockholm Arlanda Airport (2024)
Rank	Airport	Passengers handled	% change 2023/24
1	Luleå	901,328	▼4.5
2	Umeå	551,688	▼2.8
3	Gothenburg	395,571	▼22.1
4	Skellefteå	282,033	▼9.0
5	Malmö	224,556	▼30.6
6	Kiruna	216,363	▲1.3
7	Östersund	199,778	▼9.2
8	Visby	83,753	▼4.5
9	Ängelholm	81,737	▼14.4
10	Ronneby	42,582	▼24.4

== Winter time operations and snow clearing ==
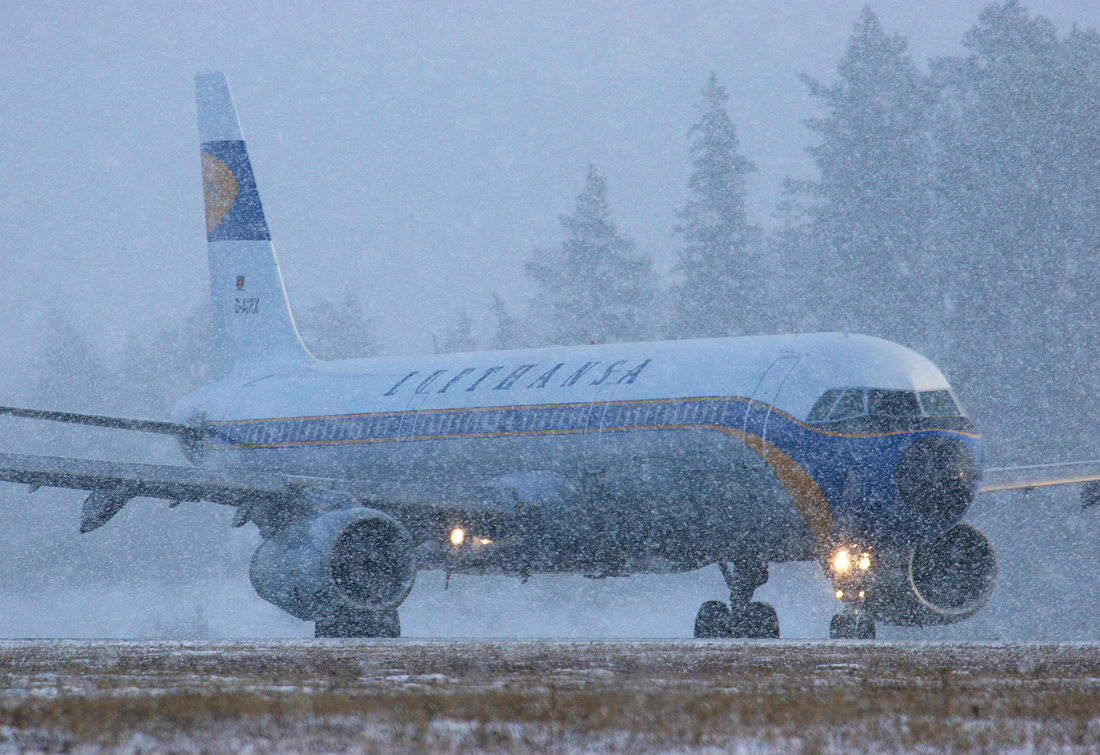
A Lufthansa Airbus A321 in a special retro livery taxiing in snow at Arlanda

Arlanda has a policy to never close due to snowfall. Arlanda is exposed to lake-effect snowfalls, where ice cold air from the northeast in combination with open water in the Baltic Sea causes heavy snowfall. During heavy snowfall at least one runway stays open but in bad weather condition there may be delays even if flight operations continue at all times. Not just runways need to be cleared, aprons and aircraft parking areas need snow clearing as well. It is an advantage that there are three runways allowing two open runways when one is cleared at lighter snowfall. The airport has a total of 250 000 m^{2} to clear from snow and ice, at the same time as the aircraft continue taking off and landing. During the colder half of the year Stockholm Arlanda has about 65 seasonally hired snow removal staff. Together with permanent staff, they form a team of 100 people who provide snow removal services. Special routes are planned for sweeping teams, which clear each route at intervals of 35 to 45 minutes. The sweeping teams are directed via radio from the air traffic control tower. When snow removal is completed on each runway the surface is tested by a friction vehicle, which measures friction value. The airport announces the friction value, and then it is each pilot who decides whether the value is sufficient for a landing. The friction value determines how often a runway must be ploughed and treated with antiskid agent.

== VIP flights and services ==
Arlanda, as the main airport serving the Swedish capital, is also used by VIP-flights using business jets. Government officials and celebrities are frequent visitors. In April 2011, the then-Chairman of the Russian Government Vladimir Putin visited Stockholm with a couple of large jet airplanes. The Emperor of Japan has also visited Arlanda with his Boeing 747s. In September 2013, U.S. President Barack Obama, made an official visit to Sweden with Air Force One. EU-meetings and exhibitions in the Stockholm area also bring special flights to the airport. Various private companies use their business jets to attend meetings in the Stockholm area. Some VIP-flights also go to the more central Bromma Airport, but since Bromma has limited operational hours and does not allow large aircraft, many go to Arlanda instead. European Flight Service has a Grumman Gulfstream G550 based at Arlanda for VIP flights.

Arlanda has several VIP lounges. They allow travellers to meet their planes on the tarmac. The VIP area can also hold weddings, with or without a flight. The airport also holds weddings in the control tower.

== Ground transportation ==
=== Rail ===
Arlanda Airport is connected to Sweden's rail network via the Arlanda Line, a railway that connects Stockholm Arlanda Airport to the East Coast Line. This line opened in 1999 and runs in a tunnel beneath the airport, with three separate stations: Arlanda South, Arlanda North, and Arlanda Central. The line is not owned by Swedavia, and is privately operated by A-Train AB, the owner of the Arlanda Express.

==== Arlanda Express ====
The Arlanda Express is the primary express train service between central Stockholm and Arlanda Airport. It runs non-stop between Stockholm Central Station and Arlanda South and North stations. For the Arlanda Express, Arlanda South Station serves Terminals 2, 3, and 4; and Arlanda North Station serves Terminal 5.

==== Regional and national trains ====
Arlanda is additionally served by many long-distance trains from Arlanda Central Station, with connections to various destinations north and south of the airport. These services are primarily operated by SJ and Mälartåg.

- SJ operates several train types, including InterCity, Regional, Nattåg night trains, and high-speed Snabbtåg services. These trains connect Arlanda to major cities such as Stockholm, Uppsala, Gävle, Sundsvall, Umeå, and Östersund.
- Mälartåg provides regional services to destinations including Stockholm, Uppsala, Eskilstuna, Arboga, and Linköping.

==== Local trains ====
The Stockholm commuter rail (Pendeltåg) provides service to Arlanda Airport via Arlanda Central station. It connects the airport to Stockholm County and Uppsala, with a travel time of approximately 38 minutes to Stockholm Central and 18 minutes to Uppsala Central. Due to an exit fare levied by the privately operated Arlanda Line, fares from Arlanda Central Station are higher than typical SL journeys.

Proposals have been made to extend the Roslagsbanan local railway to Arlanda Airport, to improve connectivity to north-eastern Stockholm, including areas such as Danderyd, Täby, and Vallentuna. As of 2024, there has been no formal decision to extend the Roslagsbanan to Arlanda.

=== Bus ===
==== Coach services ====
The main bus terminal at Arlanda Airport is situated outside Terminal 4. Flygbussarna offers regular departures to central Stockholm. Several other operators provide services to and from the airport, including Flixbus, SL, UL, and Vy bus4you. Flixbus and Vy bus4you run long-distance coach services to various destinations across Sweden.

==== Local buses ====
- SL: SL operates limited bus routes to Arlanda within Stockholm County, including to Märsta railway station, as well as night busses to central Stockholm.
- UL: UL buses connect Arlanda to nearby Uppsala County.

=== Road ===
The E4 motorway passes by Arlanda Airport, connecting it to central Stockholm, Uppsala, and northern Sweden. The airport offers near-terminal, short-term, and long-term parking options. Rental car facilities are also available at Arlanda.

=== Taxi ===
Taxis at Arlanda Airport are regulated by Swedavia, the airport operator. Only approved taxi companies with agreements are permitted to operate from designated areas outside Terminals 2 and 5. Non-approved taxis operate from elsewhere around the airport .

== Environment ==
There is an ongoing work to limit Arlanda's negative impact on the environment. In an effort to save electricity, buildings at Arlanda use district heating with biofuels and district cooling with water from a nearby lake. The take off charges for aircraft are partly based on the environmental performance of the aircraft and Arlanda is experimenting with Continuous Descent Approaches and landings, often referred to as "green landings". Jet fuel is since around 2006 delivered by boat to Gävle and via train to Brista close to Märsta and from there through pipeline. Previously fuel was delivered by ship to Värtahamnen in Stockholm and then by trucks through Stockholm city to Arlanda. The airport also takes measures to promote the use of bio fuel in taxis operating to and from the airport.

One of the most interesting eco-friendly systems Stockholm Arlanda Airport uses is a unique heating and cooling system for their hangar, terminals, and other buildings on the airfield. This innovative system uses a series of wells, linked to a large underground aquifer. The water from the underground source is plumbed up and into the facility's air system, which controls the temperature of the air coming from the vents. In the summer, the underground water remains cooler than the surface. This allows the terminals to be cooled off without using extra energy that an air conditioner would require. In the winter, the underground water remains warmer than the surface. The water is plumbed to a control/heating unit, which uses biofuel to heat the water to a temperature appropriate for warming the buildings.

The water is also used to heat pads of cement on the ramp and near the large hangar doors, efficiently keeping the doors and ramps clear of ice. After the water is run through the system, it is replaced into the aquifer to be used again.

== Incidents and accidents ==
- 1 November 1969: A Linjeflyg Convair 440 registered as SE-BSU suffered an accident while being used for training purposes. After a simulated engine failure at takeoff the left wing contacted the ground and the aircraft crash-landed after the nose and main landing gear collapsed. None of the four persons on board were killed, but the aircraft was written off.
- 5 January 1970: A Spantax Convair 990 registered as EC-BNM on a ferry flight from Stockholm Arlanda Airport to Zurich Airport (ZRH) crashed while climbing after take-off. The aircraft had been scheduled for a charter flight earlier in the day, but the flight was cancelled after the no. 4 engine developed trouble. The decision was made to ferry the aircraft using three engines to Zurich for repairs and the aircraft departed at 10:54 p.m. from runway 19 (currently runway 19R). The aircraft contacted trees approximately 1,800 m (5,906 ft) from the point of lift-off. Five of the 10 passengers and crew on board were killed and the aircraft was written off.
- 14 July 1973: A Sterling Airways Sud Aviation Caravelle registered as OY-SAN taxied into an obstruction and was written off as being damaged beyond repair.
- 25 January 1974: Scandinavian Airlines Sud Aviation Caravelle registered as OY-KRA was damaged beyond repair and written off.
- 6 January 1987: A Transwede Sud Aviation Caravelle registered as SE-DEC on a non-scheduled flight from Stockholm–Arlanda Airport to Alicante Airport (ALC) encountered problems after take-off most likely caused by ice. The aircraft hit the runway hard causing the landing gear to fail and the aircraft slid off the runway and caught fire. None of the 27 passengers and crew was killed but the aircraft was written off and subsequently used by the airport's ARFF as a fire and rescue training aircraft.
- 27 December 1991: Scandinavian Airlines Flight 751, a McDonnell Douglas MD-81, registered as OY-KHO, a scheduled flight from Stockholm–Arlanda Airport to Warsaw-Frederic Chopin Airport (WAW) with a stopover at Copenhagen-Kastrup Airport (CPH) crashed shortly after take-off because of a dual engine failure when clear ice, which had formed during the night, was not properly removed during de-icing, broke off and was ingested into the engines. None of the 129 passengers and crew was killed but the aircraft was written off.
- 7 October 1997: A BAC One-Eleven belonging to Tarom registered as YR-BCM on a scheduled flight from Bucharest-Otopeni International Airport (OTP) to Stockholm–Arlanda Airport suffered a failure of the nosewheel steering after touching down heavily on runway 26. As the airplane slowed down the commander discovered that he could not control the aircraft, which left the runway and continued into the grassy area to on the right side. The aircraft slowed down softly and when it came to a stop the passengers and crew were able to disembark using the normal exits. The aircraft was written off and taken to Halmstad by Le Caravelle Club to be used as a fire trainer.
- 8 October 1999: A Saab 2000 belonging to SAS Commuter registered as SE-LSF called "Eir Viking" ran into a closed hangar door. At the time it was supposedly being taxied by two engineers or technicians. The two people on board received some injuries and the aircraft was written off.

== See also ==
- Civil Aviation Administration (Sweden)
- List of airports in Sweden
- Stockholm Västerås Airport
