= Swedish Export Credit Corporation =

The Swedish Export Credit Corporation (Swedish: Aktiebolaget Svensk Exportkredit) is a state-owned corporation that serves as an export credit agency. It provides medium- and long-term export credits. It works with the Ministry of Finance.

== See also ==
- National Export Credits Guarantee Board (Sweden)
