= X3 (train) =

Train model by Alstom

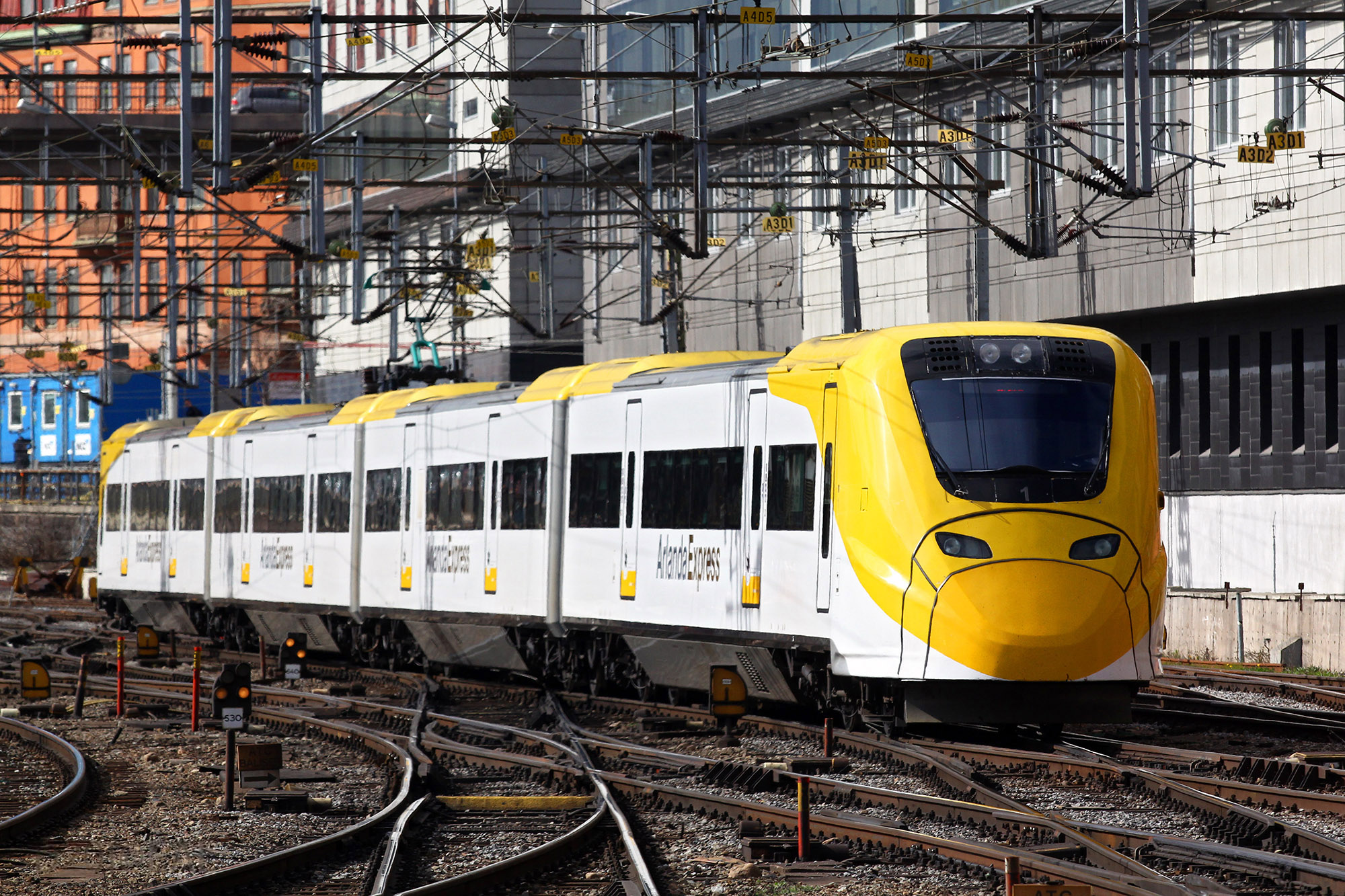
- An X3 at Stockholm Central Station in April 2017
- Manufacturer: Alstom
- Built at: Washwood Heath, England
- Family name: Alstom Coradia
- Constructed: 1998–1999
- Entered service: 1999
- Number built: 7
- Fleet numbers: 1–7
- Operators: Arlanda Express

Specifications
- Maximum speed: Service: 200 km/h (125 mph); Design: 205 km/h (127 mph)
- Weight: 187 t (184 long tons; 206 short tons)
- Power output: 2,240 kW (3,000 hp)
- Electric system(s): 15 kV 16 2/3 Hz AC catenary
- Current collection: Pantograph
- Track gauge: 1,435 mm (4 ft 8 1/2 in) standard gauge

The X3 is an electric multiple unit high-speed train used by Arlanda Express on the airport rail link service between Stockholm Central Station and Stockholm Arlanda Airport in Sweden. Alstom built seven of these four-train car units at its Washwood Heath plant in England in 1998/99. The X3 is part of the Alstom Coradia family, and can reach speeds up to 200 km/h.

== Overview ==
The trains are painted white with yellow ends with a Scandinavian designed interior. The units use standard gauge tracks and are fed electricity at 15 kV 16.7 Hz AC like the rest of the Swedish railway network, but the trains use separate stations at Arlanda and dedicated tracks at Stockholm Central; in both cases, the platforms are higher than at other stations in Sweden, allowing step-free access to the trains without the use of low floors.

== Future ==
In 2025, an order for seven six-carriage Stadler Flirts was placed to replace the X3 fleet.
