= Västflyg =

Swedish virtual airline

- Founded: 17 December 2020
- Commenced operations: 28 March 2022
- Focus cities: Trollhättan, Stockholm
- Fleet size: 2 (operated by NyxAir)
- Destinations: 6
- Parent company: Västflyg AB
- Headquarters: Trollhättan–Vänersborg Airport, Sweden
- Key people: Anna Petre (CEO)
- Website: vastflyg.se

Västflyg is a Swedish virtual airline headquartered at Trollhättan–Vänersborg Airport in Trollhättan, Sweden. It was founded in December 2020 and commenced operations on 28 March 2022 to provide air service between Trollhättan and Stockholm. Västflyg operates as a virtual airline and contracts its flights to NyxAir, an Estonian airline.

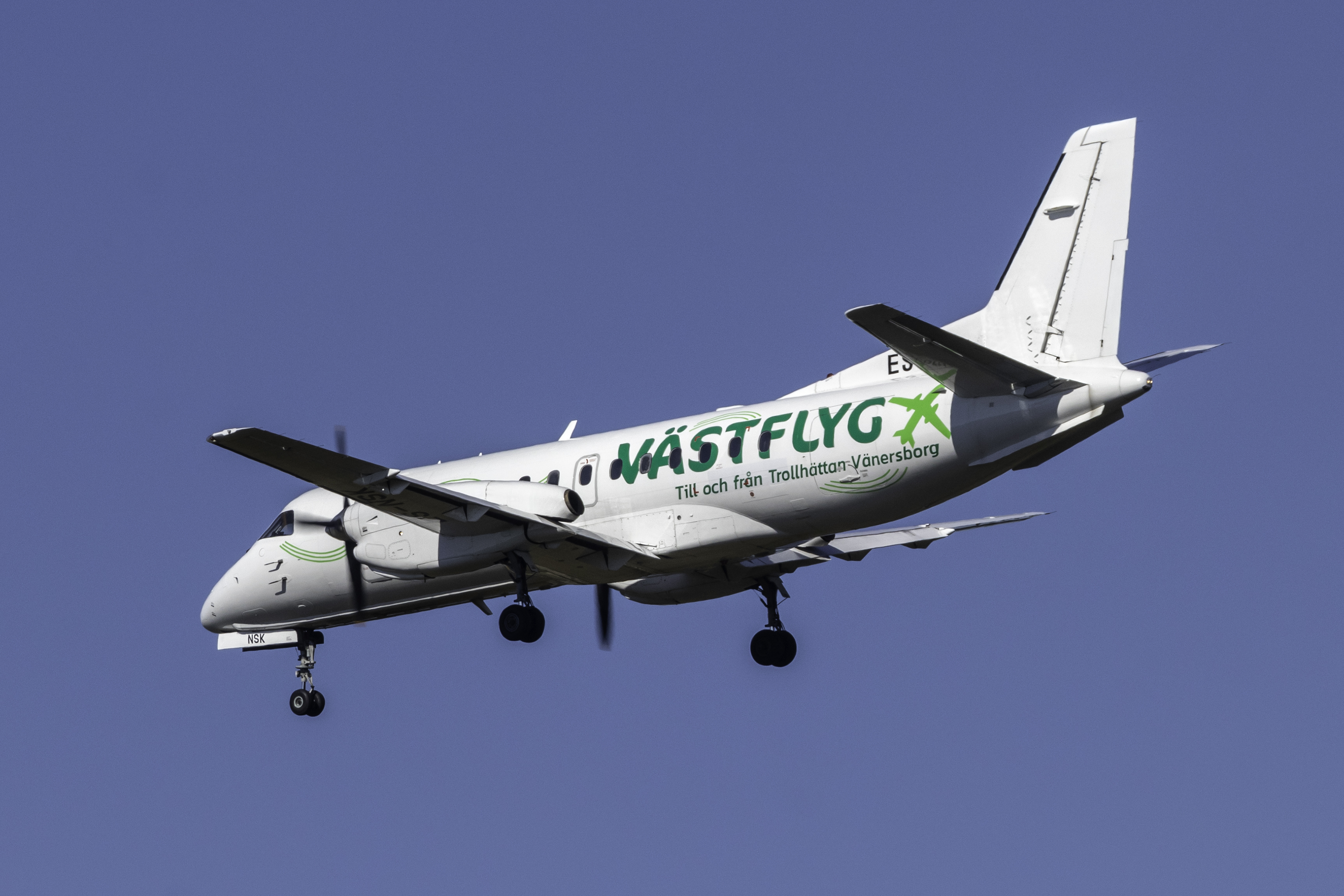
NyxAir Saab 340 operated for Västflyg

== History ==
Västflyg was founded in December 2020 with the goal of restoring regular passenger flights from Stockholm to the Trollhättan region, which had lost commercial air service prior to the COVID-19 pandemic. Its first scheduled route launched on 28 March 2022, connecting Trollhättan–Vänersborg Airport with Stockholm Bromma Airport.

In November 2023, Västflyg announced a seasonal route to the Scandinavian Mountains Airport, providing access to Sälen and Trysil for winter tourism. This route, began on 21 December 2023 and operating twice weekly.

In October 2024, Västflyg launched a route from Trollhättan to Stockholm Arlanda, Stockholm's main airport, aiming to increase accessibility to onward connections from Arlanda.

== Operations ==
Västflyg operates flights from Trollhättan–Vänersborg Airport and Växjö-Kronoberg Airport, primarily targeting travellers in western Sweden. Flights are conducted using two Saab 340B aircraft, which are operated by NyxAir and can accommodate 34 passengers.

As of June 2025, Västflyg operates 8 weekly flights from Trollhättan and 10 weekly flights from Växjö to Stockholm-Bromma. Additionally, the airline offers two weekly flights between Trollhättan and Stockholm-Arlanda and seasonal services to Visby and Scandinavian Mountains Airport.

== Destinations ==
The following destinations were marketed by Västflyg as of June 2025:

Country	City	Airport	Notes
Sweden	Sälen	Sälen/Scandinavian Mountains Airport	
Sweden	Stockholm	Stockholm Arlanda Airport	
Sweden	Stockholm	Stockholm Bromma Airport	
Sweden	Trollhättan	Trollhättan–Vänersborg Airport	
Sweden	Visby	Visby Airport	
Sweden	Växjö	Växjö-Kronoberg Airport	

== Environmental Initiatives ==
Västflyg provides passengers with the option to purchase biofuel for their flights and operates at lower altitudes when feasible to reduce fuel consumption. For the Sälen-Trysil route, Västflyg planned to use the highest possible biofuel blend to minimize environmental impact. The airline’s sustainability efforts align with Swedavia's climate initiatives. In 2024, Västflyg partnered with Trollhättan-Vänersborg Airport to become the first airline to operate all flights using a sustainable aviation fuel (SAF) blend.

== Fleet ==
While Västflyg does not own its aircraft, it offers flights operated by NyxAir using the following:

Aircraft	In service	Notes
Saab 340B	2	Operated by NyxAir
