= Sälen/Scandinavian Mountains Airport =

Regional airport in Dalarna, Sweden

Sälen/Scandinavian Mountains Airport Sälen-Scandinavian Mountains flygplats

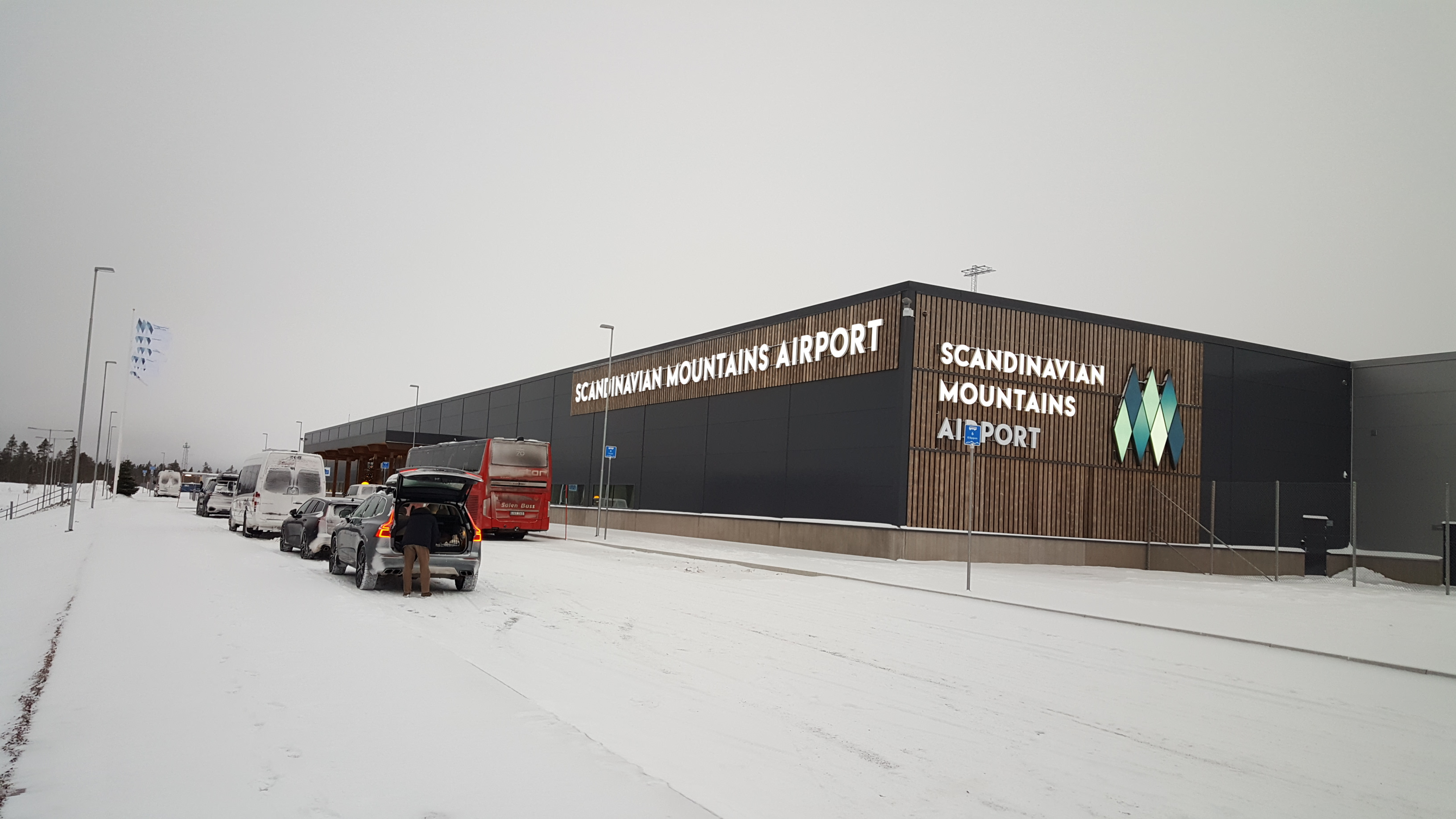
- IATA: SCR; ICAO: ESKS

Summary
- Airport type: Public
- Owner: Scandinavian Mountains Airport AB
- Serves: Sälen and Trysil
- Location: Rörbäcksnäs, Malung-Sälen, Dalarna, Sweden
- Opened: 22 December 2019; 6 years ago
- Time zone: UTC+01:00 (CET)
  - Summer (DST): UTC+02:00 ()
- Elevation AMSL: 490 m (1,610 ft)
- Coordinates: 61.1590°N 12.8400°E
- Website: www.scandinavianmountains.se

Map
- Location within Sweden

Runways
Direction	Length		Surface
Direction	m	ft	Surface
15/33	2,500	8,202	Asphalt

Statistics (2023)
- Passengers: 19,064
- International passengers: 11,189
- Domestic passengers: 7,875

Sälen/Scandinavian Mountains Airport (IATA: SCR, ICAO: ESKS), also referred to as Sälen Trysil Airport, and marketed as Scandinavian Mountains Airport, is an international airport in the Scandinavian Mountains, in the municipality of Malung-Sälen in Dalarna, Sweden. Close to the Norwegian border, it was constructed on the site of an existing small sports airfield.

The airport officially opened on December 22, 2019 and is the first new airport in Sweden since Pajala Airport opened in 1999. The airport is privately owned by Scandinavian Mountains Airport AB, a consortium of local tourism stakeholders. It was the first airport in the world designed to be operated with virtual air traffic control.

== History ==
=== Airstrip ===
The location of Scandinavian Mountains Airport was initially an airstrip constructed in the late 1960s on farmland at Mobergskölen near the village of Rörbäcksnäs, 6.5 km (4.0 mi) by road or 4.7 km (2.9 mi) by straight line from the Norwegian border. Originally established by locals interested in aviation, it served as a small sports airfield. The airstrip grew in the 1970s when the local Sälenfjällens Flying Club took over operations, naming it Sälen Trysil Airport in 1972. By 2005, the runway had been extended to 1,199 meters to better support local aviation needs. In the early 2000s, ski resorts on both sides of the border experienced an increase in international tourism, leading to plans for an airport to accommodate guests from across Europe. Before opening, the nearest commercial airports to the area were the local Mora Airport (113 km from Sälen/168 km from Trysil) and Oslo Airport (213 km from Sälen/171 km from Trysil). The airstrip and airport should not be confused with the Trysil Airstrip (ICAO:ENTS), a private 800 metres (2,600 ft) paved airstrip in Norway, 30 km west of Sälen Airport.

=== Airport planning and construction ===
Planning for the new airport began in the early 2010s as a response to the growing demand in the Scandinavian ski tourism industry. The project was led by new owners Scandinavian Mountains Airport AB, a consortium of local tourism stakeholders from both Sweden and Norway, including municipal tourist promotion companies and SkiStar, which owns nearby ski resorts. Plans focused on building an airport to accommodate charter flights for tourists coming to the winter sports resorts of Sälen and Idre in Sweden, and Trysil in Norway. An initial report commissioned by the Swedish Transport Agency questioned the airport’s passenger forecasts, recommending that Mora Airport, located an hour away, should be trialled for regional flights first. Environmental concerns were also voiced, with the network Protect Our Winters protesting the potential impact of increased air traffic on the region’s climate and winter sports viability.

In February 2013, Sweden's Land and Environmental Court approved the airport plans. By August 2013, Malung-Sälen Municipality, which had taken an active role in supporting the project, committed to a land exchange deal. The municipality swapped over 2 million SEK worth of forest land with Lima Besparingsskog, a local forestry cooperative, in exchange for the land where the airport would be constructed. In May 2017, the European Commission approved the Swedish government's investment grant of SEK 250 million to support the airport's construction. Local regions and municipalities also contributed money. Groundwork construction for the airport started in August 2017, and the 2,500-metre runway was paved by October 2018. The contract to build the terminal for the airport was awarded to Peab in June 2018, to be completed in August 2019. The airport received its IATA code, SCR, in May 2019.

=== Opening ===
Scandinavian Mountains Airport officially opened in December 2019, becoming the first new airport in Sweden in 20 years. The airport was designed with a focus on seasonal tourism, mainly catering to winter travellers. In January 2020, the Swedish government approved Scandinavian Mountains Airport to receive international flights, allowing the airport to accept passengers outside the Schengen area, particularly from London, starting February 1, 2020, following an application from Malung-Sälen municipality to designate the airport as a border crossing point.

== Operations ==
=== Civilian ===
Scandinavian Mountains Airport began operations on December 22, 2019, marking the start of its first winter season. During this initial period, Braathens Regional Airlines (BRA) operated domestic flights from several Swedish airports including Stockholm Bromma, Malmö, Ängelholm, Gothenburg and Växjö,. using ATR72-600 and BAe RJ100 aircraft. In its inaugural winter, the airport handled 14,314 passengers, with demand concentrated between December and April.

Only 14 flights were scheduled for the 2020-2021 winter season with COVID-19 resulting in nearly 400 flight cancellations to the airport. A flight from Luxembourg was the only international route for the season. The following summer, nearly all planned flights to and from Sälen were cancelled due to insufficient ticket sales. Only eight out of the 52 scheduled flights were operated.

Scandinavian Mountains Airport AB reported a loss of 24.76 million SEK in 2020, followed by a loss of 14.97 million SEK for the period from September 2021, to August 2022. For the period from September 2022, to August 2023, the company reported another loss of 26.64 million SEK. The airport's initial projections expected 35,000 passengers in its first year, but it requires between 200,000 and 300,000 annual passengers to break even, a target the management hoped to achieve within five years, despite current passenger volumes reaching approximately 19,000 in 2023.

The 2023-2024 winter season saw Scandinavian Mountains Airport reach approximately 25,000 passengers, marking a 40% increase compared to previous years. This growth was driven by international travellers, particularly from Denmark, the Netherlands, and the United Kingdom, due in part to favourable exchange rates. Tour operators such as TUI and SkiStar have planned direct flights from London to the airport for the upcoming 2024-2025 season.

=== Military use ===
Although designed for transporting tourists to the Sälen mountain region, the airport's border location has made it an asset for military activities. The airport was utilised during the Gränsland-21 military exercise in September 2021, which involved over 500 soldiers from the Swedish Armed Forces and Norwegian home guard units. This exercise was designed to prepare the airport for potential NATO operations, despite its private ownership. As the airport had no scheduled commercial flights at the time, the Swedish military was able to utilise the facilities fully during the exercise.

Following this, in January 2023, the Swedish Armed Forces, in collaboration with Norway, temporarily assumed control over the airport’s operations for another major military exercise. This initiative was part of broader NATO support scenarios. In 2024, Swedish Defence Minister Pål Jonson stated that the airport's strategic location near the Norwegian border would play a crucial role in shaping future military strategies in the region following Sweden's entry into NATO.

== Infrastructure ==
=== Terminal building ===
The terminal building spans 6,000 m^{2} and is designed to handle the seasonal influx of passengers traveling to nearby ski resorts. It has four gates and is equipped with facilities including passport control and customs areas, a restaurant, a tax-free shop, and a café. There are no passenger jet bridges; passengers walk outside from the terminal to the aircraft.

=== Air traffic control ===
Scandinavian Mountains Airport is notable for being the first airport globally designed to operate exclusively with a virtual tower for air traffic control (ATC). Instead of a traditional tower, air traffic is monitored through a remote digital system managed by Saab Digital Air Traffic Solutions (SDATS) from a control centre located 350 kilometers away in Sundsvall. This remote setup uses radars, cameras and augmented reality technology for visibility even in adverse weather conditions. The decision to implement a remote ATC system was driven by the airport's seasonal nature and the cost savings associated with remote management, which allows the control center to oversee multiple airports simultaneously.

=== Airfield & Runway ===
Scandinavian Mountains Airport features a single 2,500 meter-long runway, and is designed to accommodate aircraft with wingspans up to 65 meters. The airfield includes one taxiway connecting the runway to two aprons: one for commercial traffic, and another for general aviation.

==== Snow Removal ====
The airport has a snow removal strategy to address the heavy snowfall typical in its operational season from December to April. Snow can begin falling as early as mid-September and may extend into May. The airport is equipped with snow removal equipment to clear runways, taxiways, and aprons.

== Airlines and destinations ==
Airlines	Destinations
Braathens Regional Airlines	Seasonal charter: Groningen
easyJet	Seasonal: London–Gatwick, Manchester
Scandinavian Airlines	Seasonal: Aalborg, Aarhus, Ängelholm, Copenhagen, London–Heathrow, Stockholm–Arlanda
Transavia	Seasonal charter: Amsterdam, Groningen
TUI Airways	Seasonal: London–Gatwick
TUI fly Belgium	Seasonal: Brussels
TUI fly Deutschland	Seasonal: Düsseldorf
TUI fly Netherlands	Seasonal: Amsterdam
Västflyg	Seasonal: Trollhättan

== Statistics ==
Traffic by calendar year
Year	Passenger volume	Change	Domestic	Change	International	Change
2024	23,072	▲21%	8,376	▲6%	14,696	▲31%
2023	19,064	▲6%	7,875	▼0.2%	11,189	▲11%
2022	17,961	▲483%	7,888		10,073	
2021	3,081	▼73%	1,656		1,425	
2020	14,157	▲1720%	7,260		6,897	
2019	773		539		234	

== Ground transport ==
There are bus transfers to the ski resorts in connection with flights. The distance to the nearest one, Hundfjället, is 10 km (6 mi) and the farthest in the Sälen area, Kläppen, 45 km (28 mi). The distance to Trysil ski resort (the largest in the area) is 43 km (27 mi) and to Idre ski resort 121 km (75 mi). Taxis and car rental is available. In December 2022, a new 6 km (3.7 mi) road was opened by Trafikverket, connecting the airport at Rörbäcksnäs towards Sälen.

== See also ==
- List of airports in Norway
- List of airports in Sweden
