= Lidköping–Hovby Airport =

Lidköping–Hovby Airport Lidköping-Hovby Flygplats
- IATA: LDK; ICAO: ESGL

Summary
- Airport type: Public
- Operator: Lidköping Hovby Flygplats AB
- Serves: Lidköping
- Location: Lidköping, Sweden
- Elevation AMSL: 200 ft (61 m)
- Coordinates: 58°27′55″N 013°10′27″E
- Interactive map of Lidköping–Hovby Airport

Runways
Direction	Length		Surface
Direction	m	ft	Surface
06/24	1,990	6,529	Asphalt
06/24	875	2,871	Grass
- Source: DAFIF

Lidköping–Hovby Airport (Swedish: Lidköping-Hovby Flygplats) (IATA: LDK, ICAO: ESGL), also known as Lidköping Airport, is an airport situated 5 km outside Lidköping, Sweden. The airport was built by Swedish Air Force in the 1940s. It was bought by Lidköping Municipality in 2000 and is now in civilian use.

== Airlines and destinations ==
After Golden Air moved their Stockholm–Bromma flights to nearby Trollhättan–Vänersborg Airport there are no scheduled passenger flights.

== Other operations ==
Lidköping–Hovby Airport is home to West Air Sweden's Technical and Operations departments.

== See also ==
- List of the largest airports in the Nordic countries
