= Visby Airport =

Visby Airport Visby flygplats
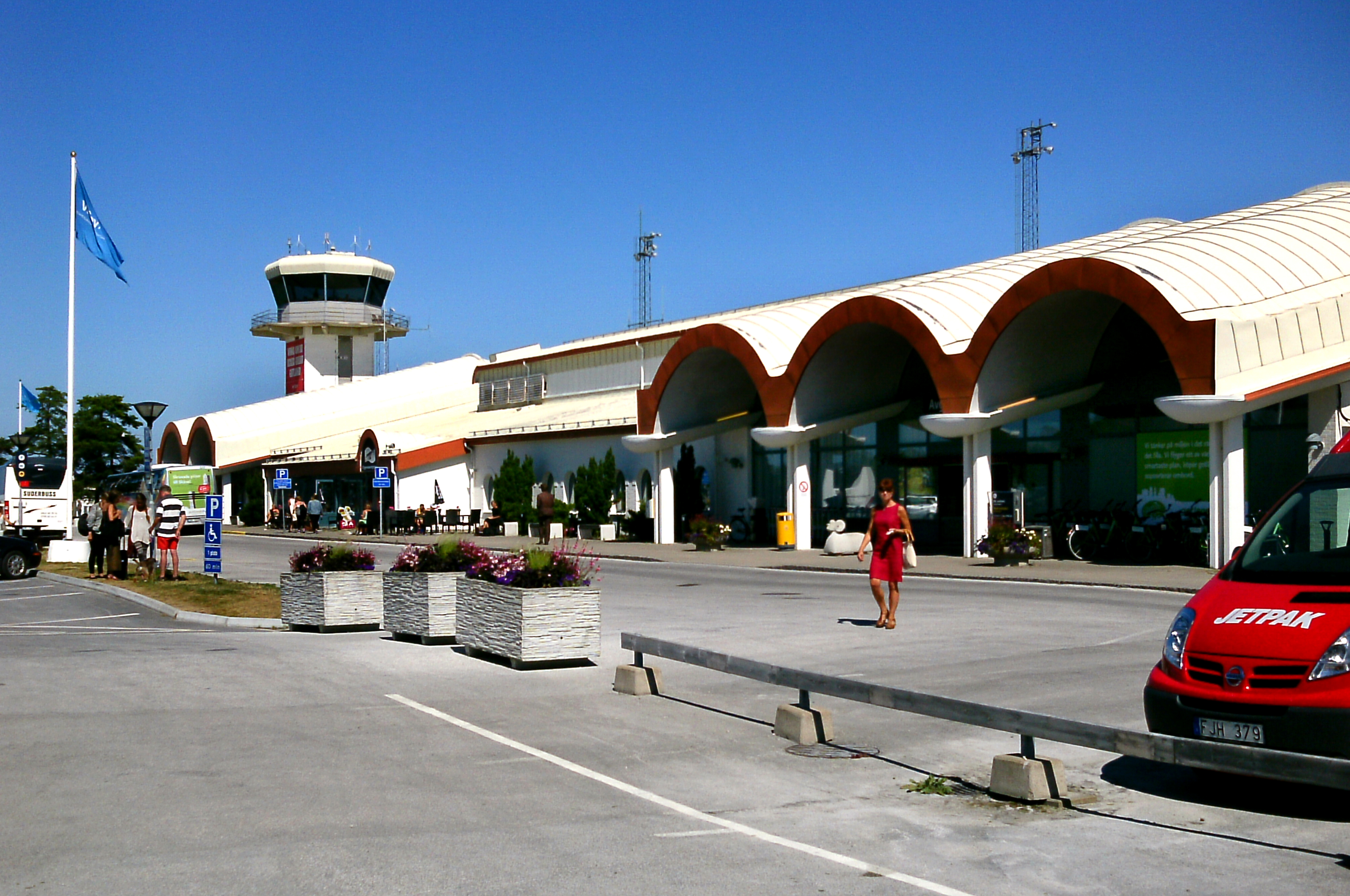
- IATA: VBY; ICAO: ESSV

Summary
- Airport type: Public (Luftfartsverket)
- Operator: Swedavia
- Serves: Visby and Gotland
- Location: Gotland, Sweden
- Elevation AMSL: 164 ft (50 m)
- Coordinates: 57°39′46″N 018°20′46″E
- Website: swedavia.com/visby/

Map
- Location within Gotland VBY (Sweden)

Runways
Direction	Length		Surface
Direction	m	ft	Surface
03/21	2,000	6,562	Asphalt
10/28	1,100	3,609	Grass

Statistics (2016)
- Passengers total: 463,616
- Domestic passengers: 448,784
- European passengers: 11,428
- Intercontinental passengers: 2,892
- AIP; Statistics: Transportstyrelsen

Visby Airport (IATA: VBY, ICAO: ESSV), is located about 3.5 kilometres (2.2 mi) north of Visby, Gotland, Sweden.

Visby airport is Gotland's only commercial airport and the 12th largest airport in Sweden. The airport had 463,616 passengers in 2016. The traffic has a large seasonal variation, with many more passengers in the summer: in 2016, it had 18,070 passengers in January and 57,302 in July. During the Almedalen Week the airport is slot coordinated.

== History ==
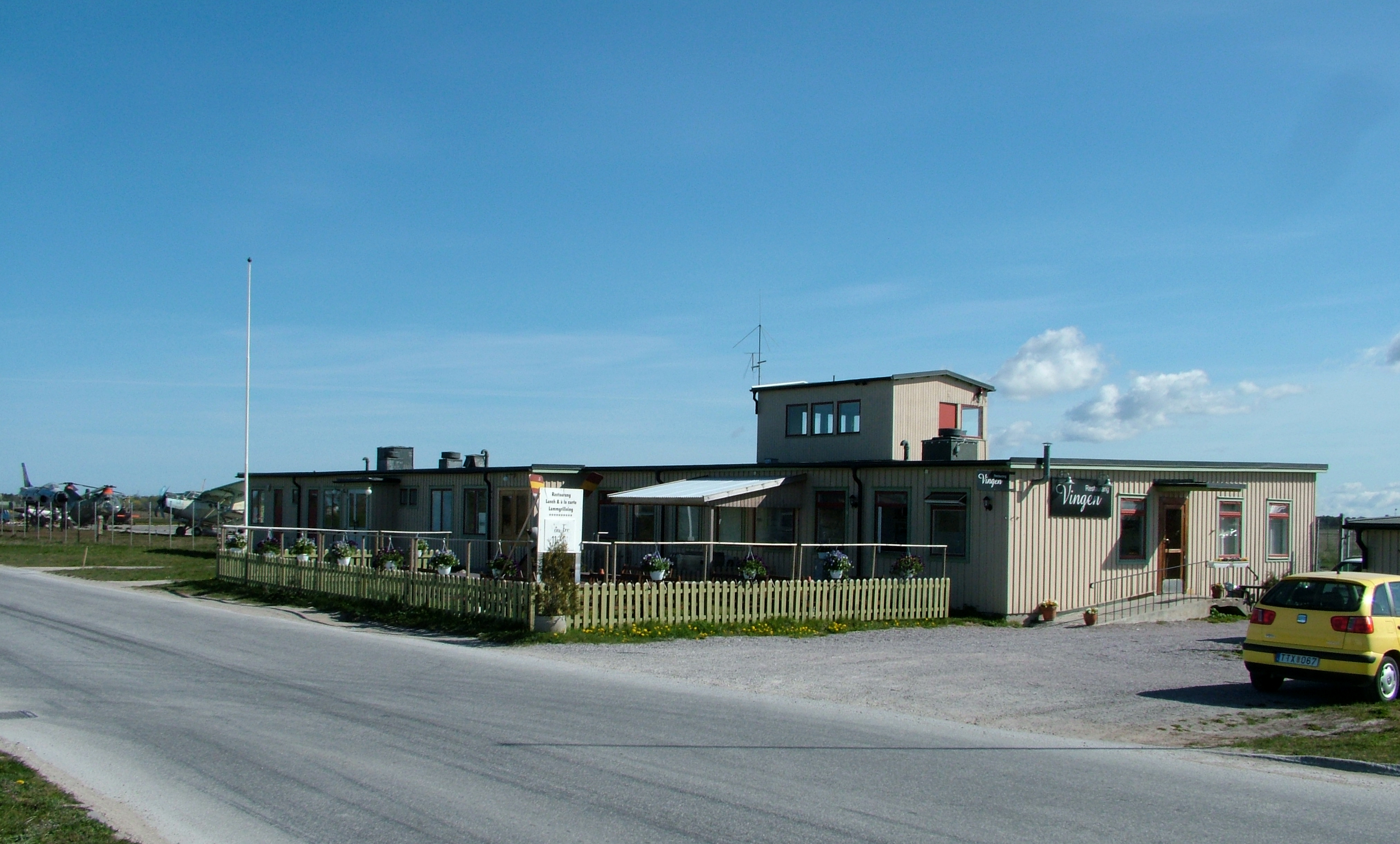
The old terminal at Visby airport

Seaplanes were used for public flights to Gotland from 1925, landing in a sheltered bay near Slite, or in Lake Tingstäde.

Visby Airport was opened on 27 January 1942. The first aircraft to land was a Junkers Ju 52/3m named Göteland from AB Aerotransport. In October of the same year, regular traffic between Visby and the Swedish mainland started, in the beginning mostly with Ju 52s. In 1958, a new terminal building, a new control tower and a new runway made of asphalt was inaugurated. A runway also featured a railway crossing. The current terminal and control tower opened in 1985.

== Tenants ==
The airport has been used for military activities from its opening in 1942, although not as a proper airbase, but as a detachment used by a mainland airbase. The airport has the only long runway on Gotland. Gotland and the airport are important in the event of a need to defend against an attack on NATO members Estonia, Latvia, and Lithuania, and for general defense of the Baltic Sea.

Apart from the commercial aviation at Visby airport, there are also a flying club and a parachuting club based at the airport. Also, the Swedish Maritime Administration has a search and rescue helicopter based in Visby.

== Airlines and destinations ==
=== Passenger ===
The following airlines operate regular scheduled and charter flights at Visby Airport:

Airlines	Destinations
BrommaFLyg	Gothenburg Stockholm Bromma
Finnair	Seasonal: Helsinki
Norwegian Air Shuttle	Seasonal: Stockholm–Arlanda
Scandinavian Airlines	Stockholm–Arlanda; Seasonal: Copenhagen
Västflyg	Seasonal: Trollhätten

=== Cargo ===
Airlines	Destinations
PopulAir	Stockholm–Arlanda

== Statistics ==
Busiest routes to and from Visby Airport (2022)
Rank	Airport	Passengers handled	% change 2021/22
1	Stockholm, Sweden (Note: Includes flights to/from Stockholm–Arlanda and Stockholm–Bromma)	259,833	▲49.2
2	Gothenburg, Sweden	15,011	▲40.3
3	Malmö, Sweden	10,346	▲335.8
4	Helsinki, Finland	3,396	New entry
5	Rhodes, Greece	2,339	▲882.8

Traffic by calendar year
Year	Passenger volume	Change	Domestic	Change	International	Change
2025	261,982	▼10.7%	252,127	▼11.5%	9,855	▲14.6%
2024	293,488	▼7.6%	284,888	▼7.7%	8,600	▼3.3%
2023	317,506	▲7.8%	308,609	▲7.2%	8,897	▲32.9%
2022	294,603	▲55.5%	287,911	▲53.1%	6,692	▲355.9%
2021	189,482	▲54.4%	188,014	▲54.6%	1,468	▲31.9%
2020	122,744	▼72.5%	121,631	▼71.9%	1,113	▼91.8%
2019	446,764	▼4.5%	433,188	▼4.7%	13,576	▲1.4%
2018	467,857	▼4.8%	454,474	▼4.2%	13,383	▼20.3%
2017	491,446	▲6.0%	474,646	▲5.8%	16,800	▲13.3%
2016	463,559	▲7.6%	448,736	▲8.1%	14,823	▼7.4%
2015	430,977	▲5.9%	414,978	▲6.5%	15,999	▼7.4%
2014	406,906	▲15.5%	389,621	▲15.7%	17,285	▲11.6%
2013	352,197	▲7.6%	336,707	▲7.1%	15,490	▲20.5%
2012	327,255		314,405		12,850	

== Unusual railroad crossing ==
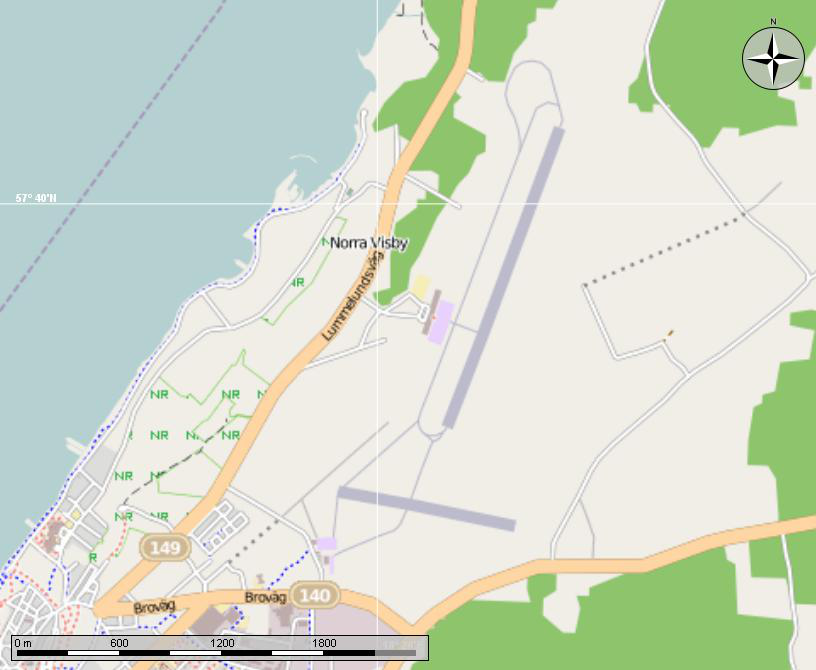
Map of the airport in Visby.

Before the railroad was closed down on the island of Gotland, the main line from Visby to the northern parts of the island actually crossed the runway. It was one of the few airports in the world where this happened. The railway traffic was ended in 1960, and the tracks were removed a few years later.

== See also ==
- List of the largest airports in the Nordic countries
