= Frost Air =

Swedish-Danish charter airline

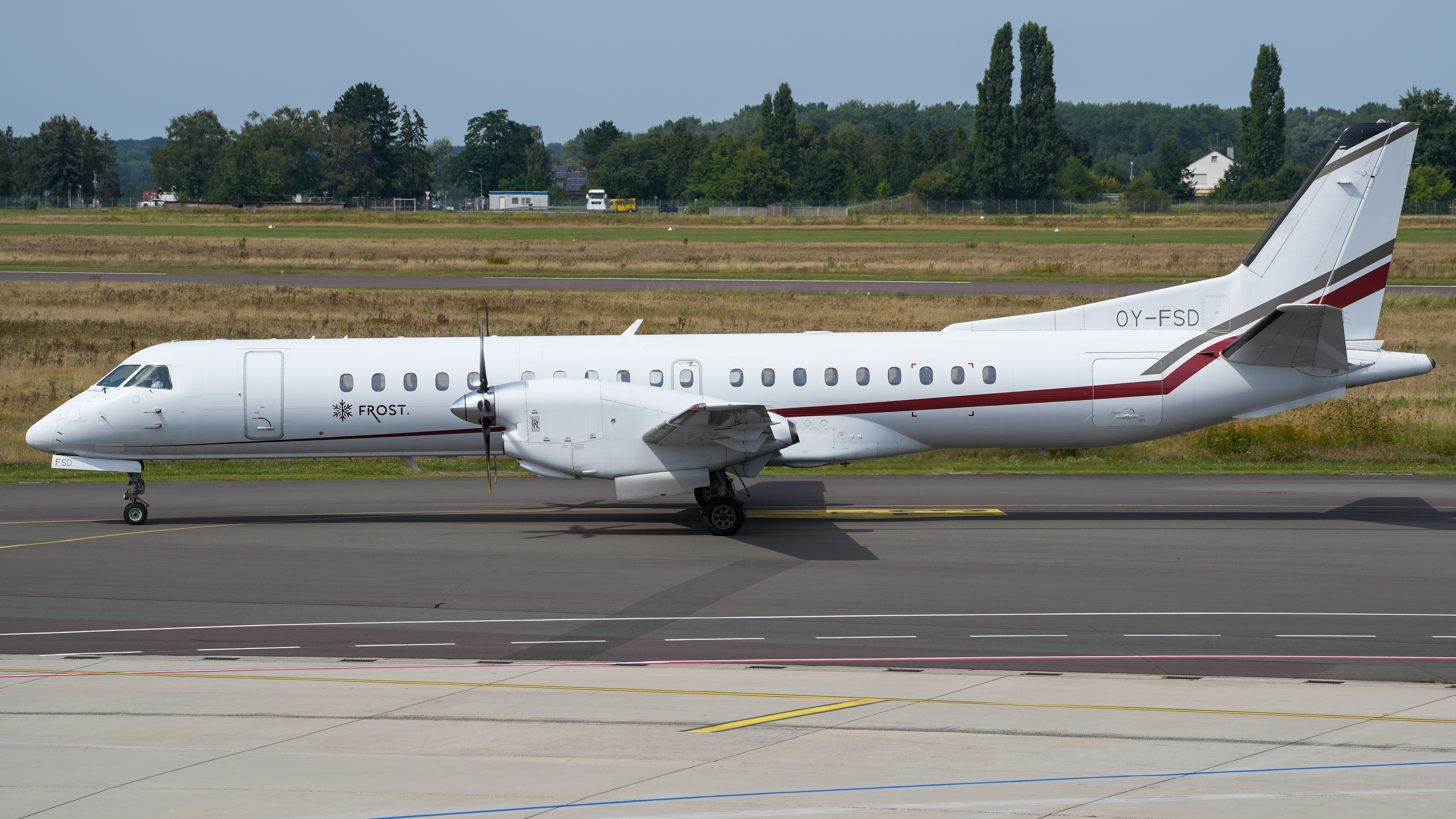
IATA	ICAO	Call sign
FT	FRO	FROST
- Founded: 2021 (own AOC 2024)
- Operating bases: Malmö Airport
- Fleet size: 5
- Destinations: international
- Headquarters: Malmö, Sweden and Tårnby, Denmark
- Key people: Stefan Nilsson (CEO)
- Website: https://frost.aero/

Frost Air is a Swedish-Danish charter airline based at Malmö Airport.

== History ==
Frost Air was founded in 2021 and started charter services the following year. At this time, all flights were operated under the air operator's certificate (AOC) of the Estonian airline NyxAir, as well as using their planes.

On May 1, 2024, the airline obtained its own AOC from the Danish Civil Aviation and Railway Authority.

== Destinations ==
Frost Air operates charter services mainly in Europe, but also in Africa and Asia (especially Middle East). Customers are, amongst others, companies, health organisations, and sports clubs. For example, the airline regularly flies for the German football clubs RB Leipzig and Borussia Dortmund.

== Fleet ==
=== Current fleet ===
As of July 2026, Frost Air operates the following aircraft:

Aircraft type	Number	On order	Notes	Seats	Median age
Saab 2000	5		one inactive	50	28.9 years
Total	5	-			28.9 years

=== Former fleet ===
As of August 2025, Frost Air operated 4 Saab 2000.
