= Stockholm Bromma Airport =

Airport in Sweden

Stockholm Bromma Airport Stockholm Bromma flygplats

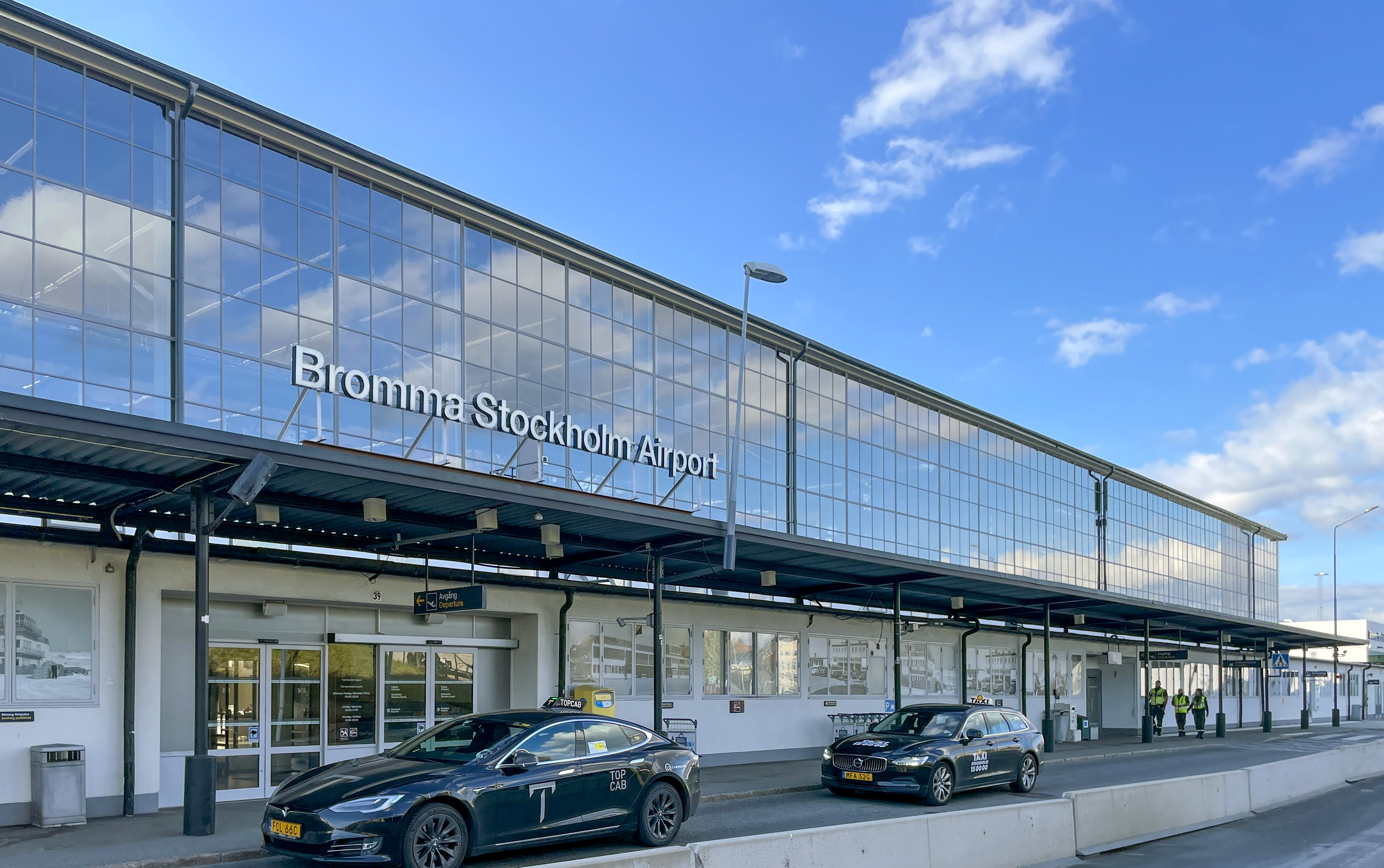
- IATA: BMA; ICAO: ESSB

Summary
- Airport type: Public
- Owner: City of Stockholm (Landowner)
- Operator: Swedavia
- Serves: Stockholm metropolitan area
- Location: Bromma
- Opened: 23 May 1936
- Elevation AMSL: 14 m (46 ft)
- Coordinates: 59°21′16″N 017°56′23″E
- Website: swedavia.com/bromma/

Map
- Location in Stockholm BMA (Sweden)

Runways
Direction	Length		Surface
Direction	m	ft	Surface
12/30	1,668	5,472	Asphalt

Statistics (2025)
- Passengers total: 24,965
- International passengers: 1,433
- Domestic passengers: 23,799
- Landings total: 5,688
- Source: Swedish AIP at EUROCONTROL; Statistics: Swedavia Swedavia

Stockholm Bromma Airport (IATA: BMA, ICAO: ESSB), officially known as Bromma Stockholm Airport, is a regional airport located in the Bromma district of Stockholm, Sweden that primarily serves private aviation.

Situated approximately 7 km (4.3 mi) northwest of central Stockholm, Bromma Airport is the closest airport to the city cente; the other commercial airports serving the Stockholm Metropolitan Area (IATA airport code STO) are Arlanda, Skavsta, and Västerås.

Opened on 13 May 1936 by King Gustaf V, it was the first airport in Europe to be built with paved runways. With the opening of Stockholm Arlanda Airport in 1962, Bromma lost its role as the primary airport for international traffic, however by 2023, Bromma Airport was still Sweden's fourth-busiest airport by passenger traffic, primarily serving domestic routes.

As of 2025, the airport's scheduled routes are Västflyg to Trollhättan and Växjö, Skåne Aviation to Malmö and Brommaflyg to Visby Bromma also operates private flights, ambulance flights and general aviation. From 2016 to 2024, Bromma Airport was predominantly served by Braathens Regional Airlines, which operated flights to various domestic destinations across Sweden before moving its operations to Stockholm Arlanda.

Stockholm Bromma Airport is located on land owned by the City of Stockholm. The airport is operated by Swedavia, a state-owned company, under a lease agreement with the city which expires in 2038. Both Swedavia and the City of Stockholm wish to close the airport, with its annual losses estimated to come to one billion SEK (€87 million) annually; however, the current Swedish government maintains that it will not allow the airport to close before the end of its current mandate period in 2026.

== History ==
=== Early proposals and construction (1910s–1930s) ===
The idea of an airport near Stockholm was first proposed in 1918 by Enoch Thulin, one of Sweden's leading aviation pioneers. Thulin suggested the establishment of an airport close to the capital city, as the existing airfield at Barkarby was considered too far from Stockholm. At that time, commercial aviation in Stockholm operated from Lindarängen seaplane station.

Elsewhere in Sweden, by 1923, airfields had been inaugurated at Bulltofta in Malmö and Torslanda in Gothenburg. Stockholm City Council subsequently launched an investigation exploring locations for a new city airport, including Årstafältet and Skarpnäck. Eventually, Riksby, a rural location to the west of the city, was deemed suitable for the new airport. Prior to this airport, the first airfield close to Stockholm was located at Norrtälje.

Construction of the new airport at Riksby began in 1933. The site partially included old marshland from an ancient lakebed. This marshy ground continues to affect the runway today, creating a dip in the runway. The airport was originally constructed with four intersecting runways measuring 2,024m, 1,411m 1,219m, and 969m in length. Only one runway remains in use.

Beams from the old Traneberg Bridge were reused in the construction of Bromma's first hangar. Both the replacement Traneberg Bridge and Bromma Airport's buildings were designed by the same architect, Paul Hedqvist.

=== Inauguration and World War II (1930s–1940s) ===
Stockholm Bromma Airport was officially opened on 23 May 1936 by King Gustaf V. The following summer nearly 100,000 people visited the airport. Notably, it was the first airport in Europe to feature paved runways from its inception. Its first operator, AB Aerotransport, began regular flights in 1937 to Malmö where Bulltofta Airport already was established. Postal night flights also began that year. By 1937, KLM had begun landing its DC-3 aircraft at Bromma.

During World War II, Swedish and British aircraft operated flights between Stockholm Bromma and the United Kingdom. Those flights often carried Norwegian and Danish refugees, making the airport a target of interest for German spies. Consequently, two Swedish Douglas DC-3 aircraft, which had taken off from Bromma, were shot down by German forces during the war.

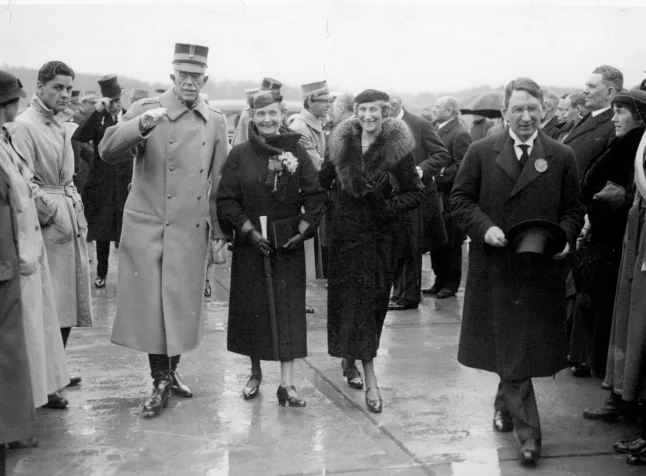
King Gustaf V at Bromma's inauguration in 1936

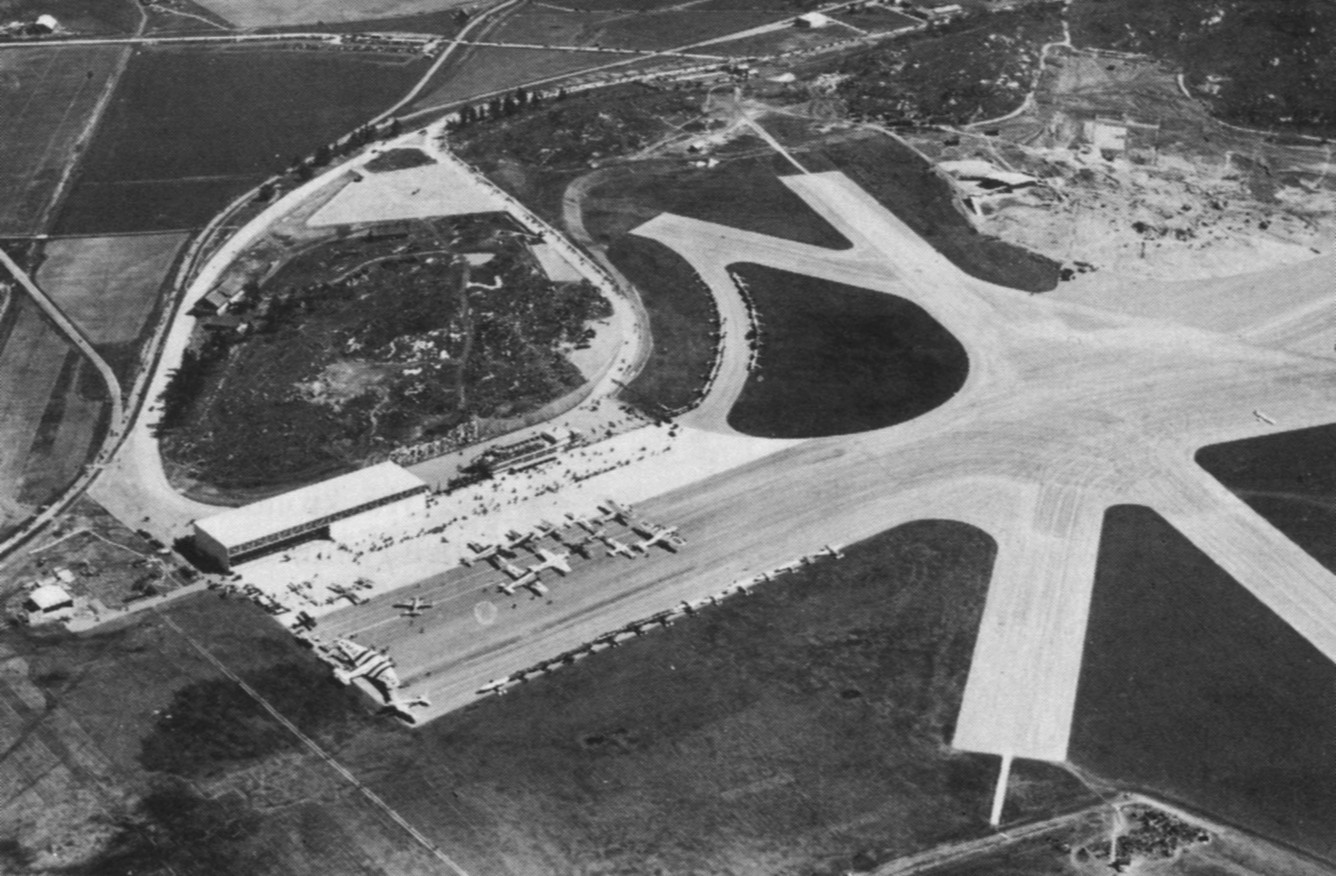
Inauguration of Bromma airport in 1936

=== Post-war (1940s–1960s) ===
After the war, Stockholm Bromma Airport experienced growth, with two major airlines operating from the airport: Aktiebolaget Aerotransport (ABA), which later became the Swedish partner in Scandinavian Airlines System (SAS), and Linjeflyg, the main domestic airline in Sweden that was eventually acquired by SAS.

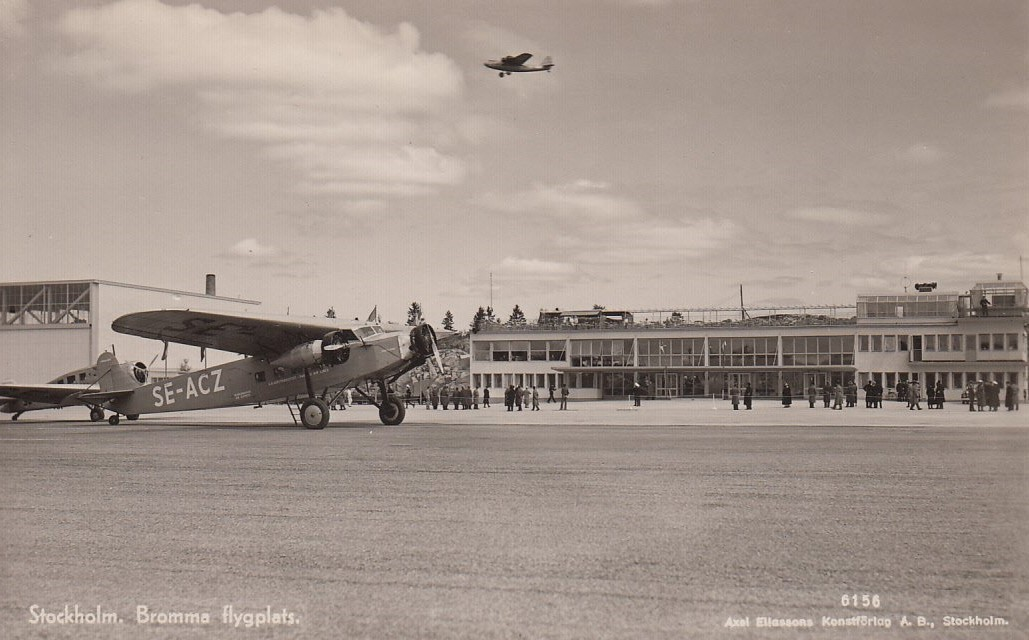
Apron, 1940s

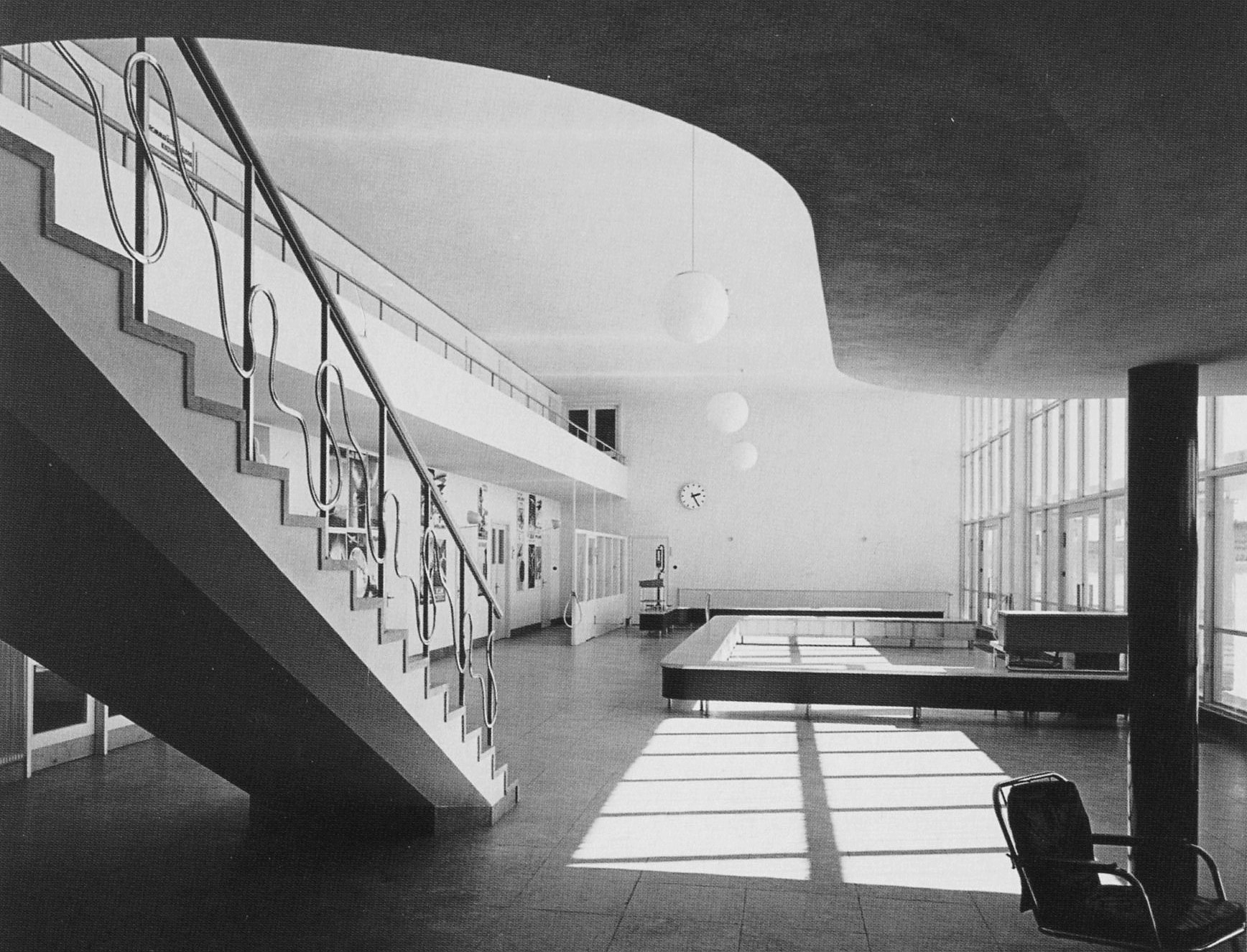
Terminal Interior, 1940s

=== Opening of Arlanda Airport (1960s–1980s) ===
By the 1960s, Bromma's runway proved too short for the emerging jet age and intercontinental traffic, such as the DC-8. Additionally, the airport's capacity limitations became apparent. Originally built in a rural area, the airport found itself surrounded by an expanding city.

With the opening of Stockholm Arlanda Airport in 1962, all international traffic was transferred from Bromma Airport. In 1984, Linjeflyg and Scandinavian Airlines (SAS) also relocated their domestic operations from Bromma to Arlanda. Stockholm Bromma Airport then became primarily used for business jets, general aviation, flight schools, and government purposes. In 1984 several old hangars were repurposed as Bromma Blocks, a retail park. In 1988, SAS moved its headquarters away from Bromma.

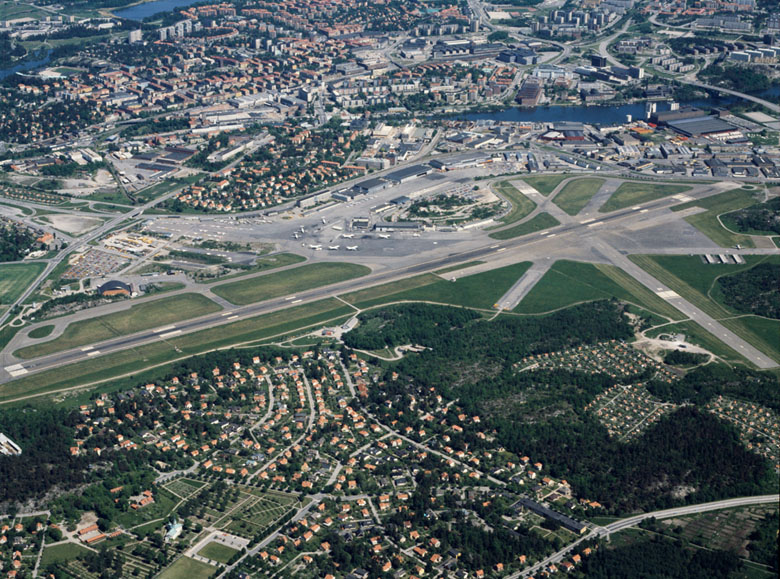
Bromma Airport in 1979 - now surrounded by Stockholm

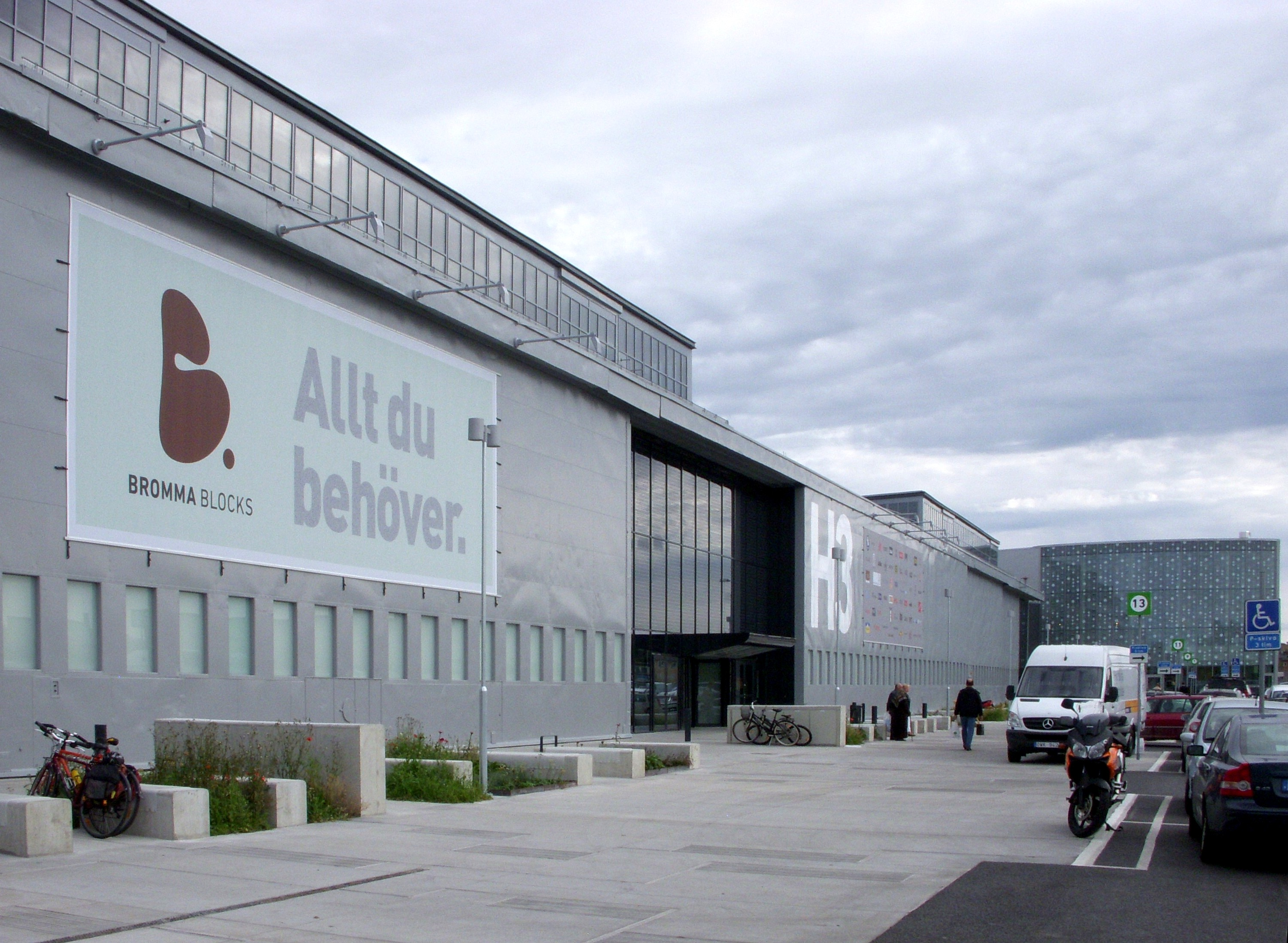
Former hangars repurposed as Bromma Blocks retail park

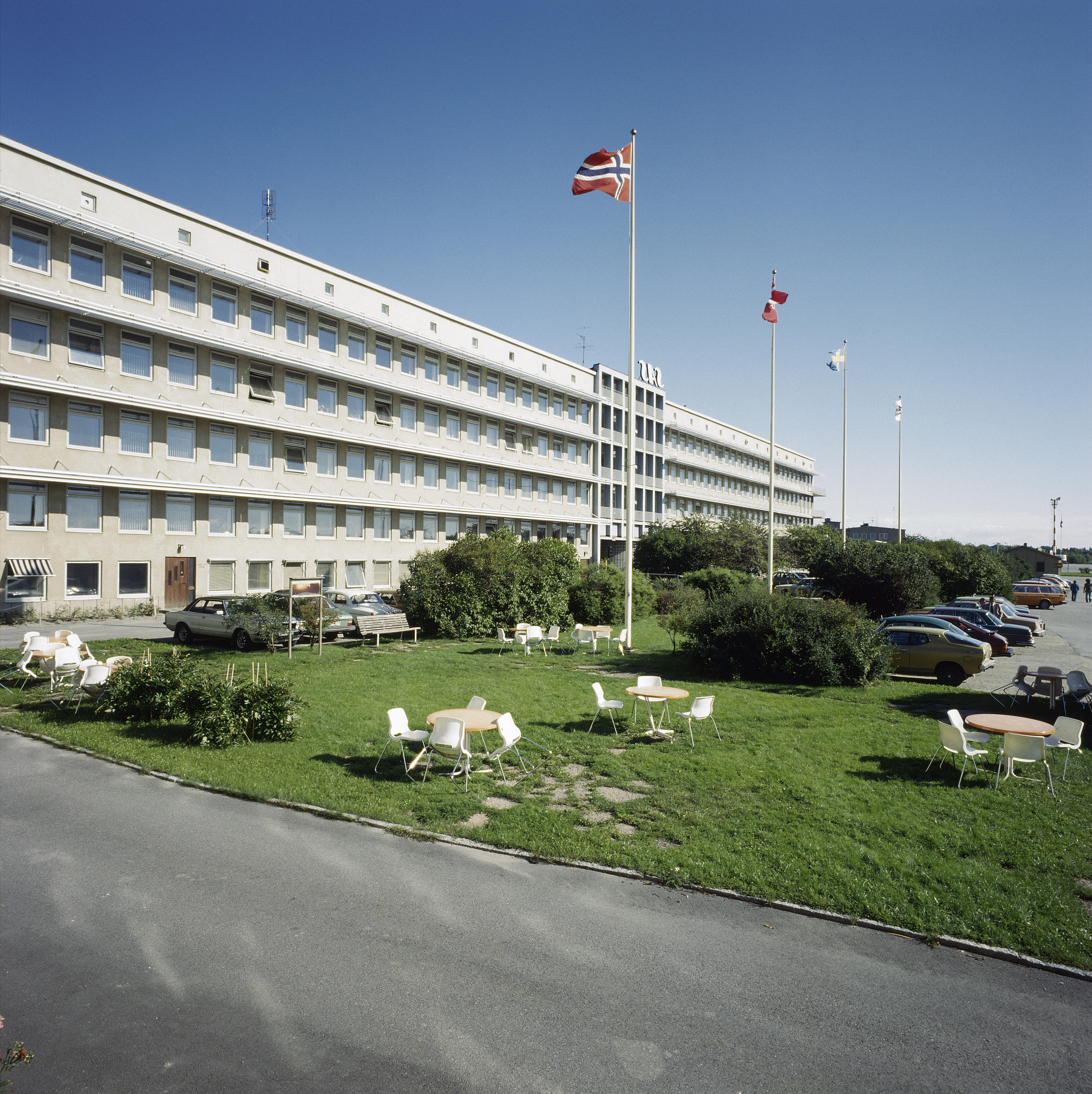
SAS Head office building at Bromma Airport, 1960s

=== Deregulated civil aviation and renewed activity (1990s–2024) ===
Following the 1992 deregulation of civil aviation in Sweden, Malmö Aviation began service to Gothenburg, Malmö, and London City Airport. This marked a period of renewed activity for the airport. In 2002, a new control tower was put into use, and the terminal, which had deteriorated after years of neglect, was renovated. Further improvements in 2005 enabled the airport to separate passengers arriving from within and outside of the Schengen area.

In 2003, the Swedish Civil Aviation Administration, announced a bidding process for a contract to build a general aviation terminal for fixed-base operator (FBO) customers. Grafair won the contract and completed the FBO facility on 11 November 2004. The Grafair Jet Center was voted the third best international FBO in May 2008 by Aviation International News.

During the COVID-19 pandemic in 2020, all flights at Stockholm Bromma Airport were suspended. Braathens Regional Airline (BRA), the main airline at Bromma, suspended all flights from 6 April 2020. BRA resumed limited operations in late 2020. On 16 May 2021, the Bromma Airport tram station was opened.

In the summer of 2024, Swedavia conducted runway maintenance at Stockholm Bromma Airport. During this period, BRA relocated its operations to Terminal 3 at Stockholm Arlanda Airport.

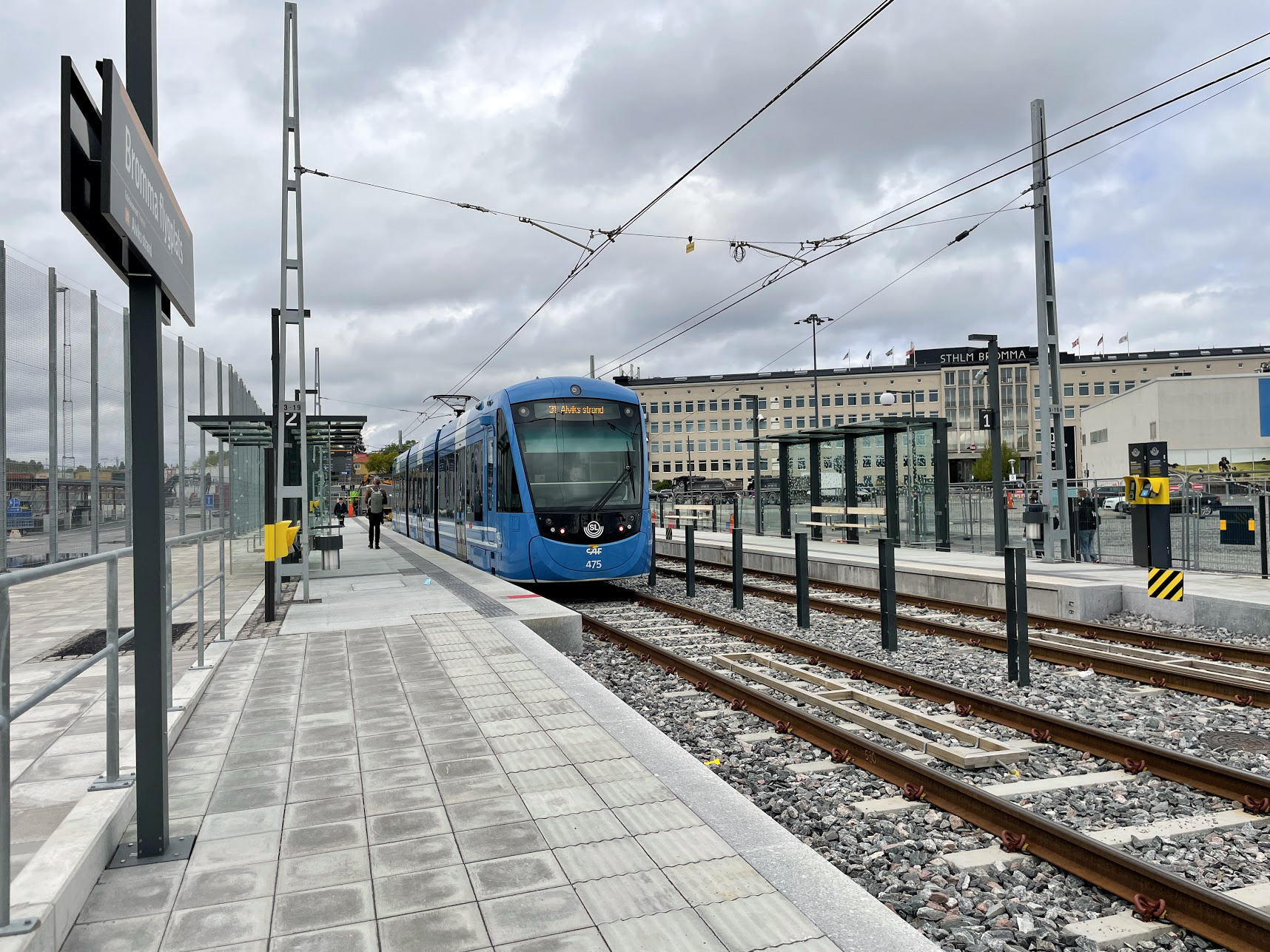
Bromma flygplats tram stop at Bromma Airport

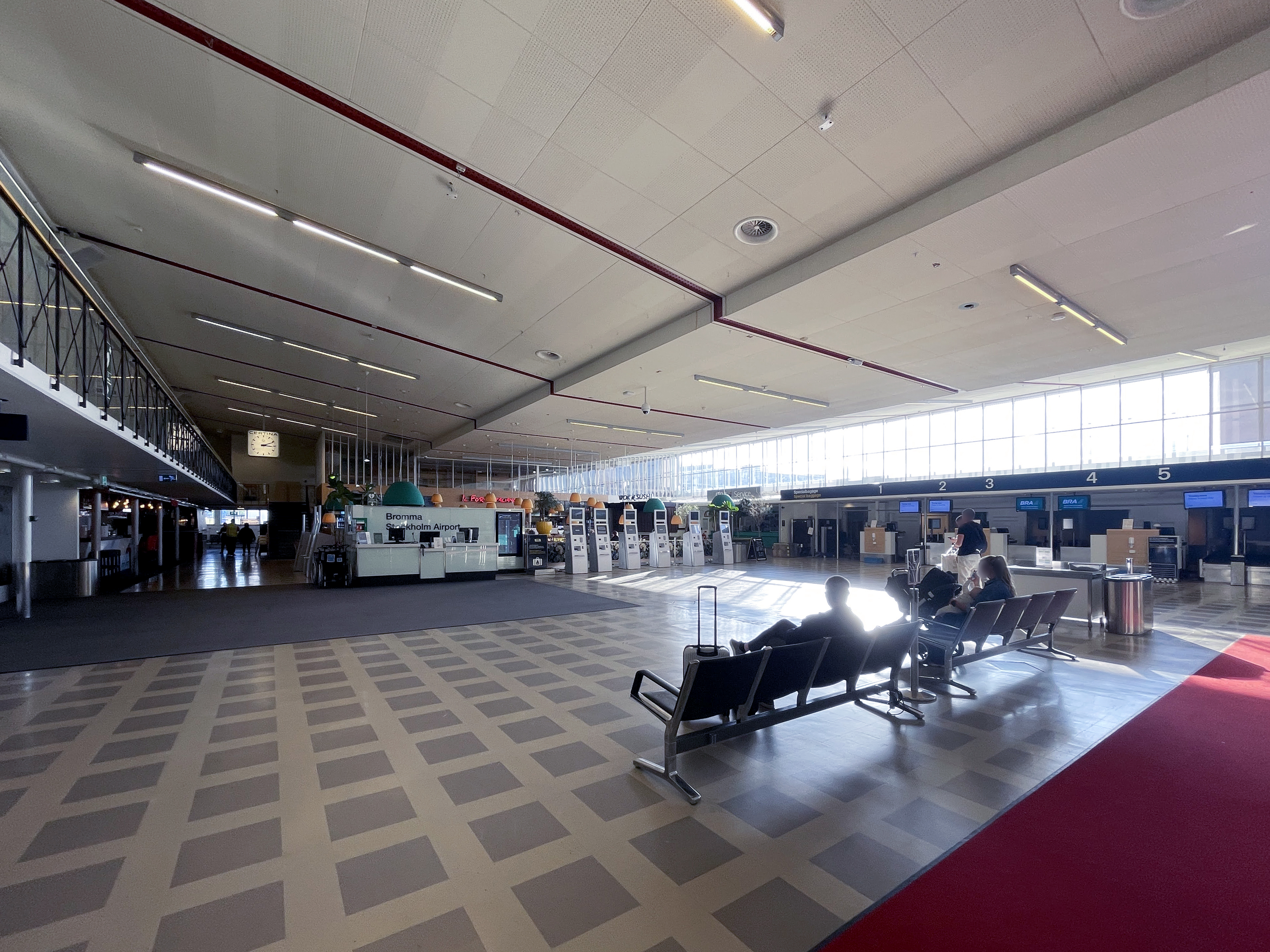
Terminal interior

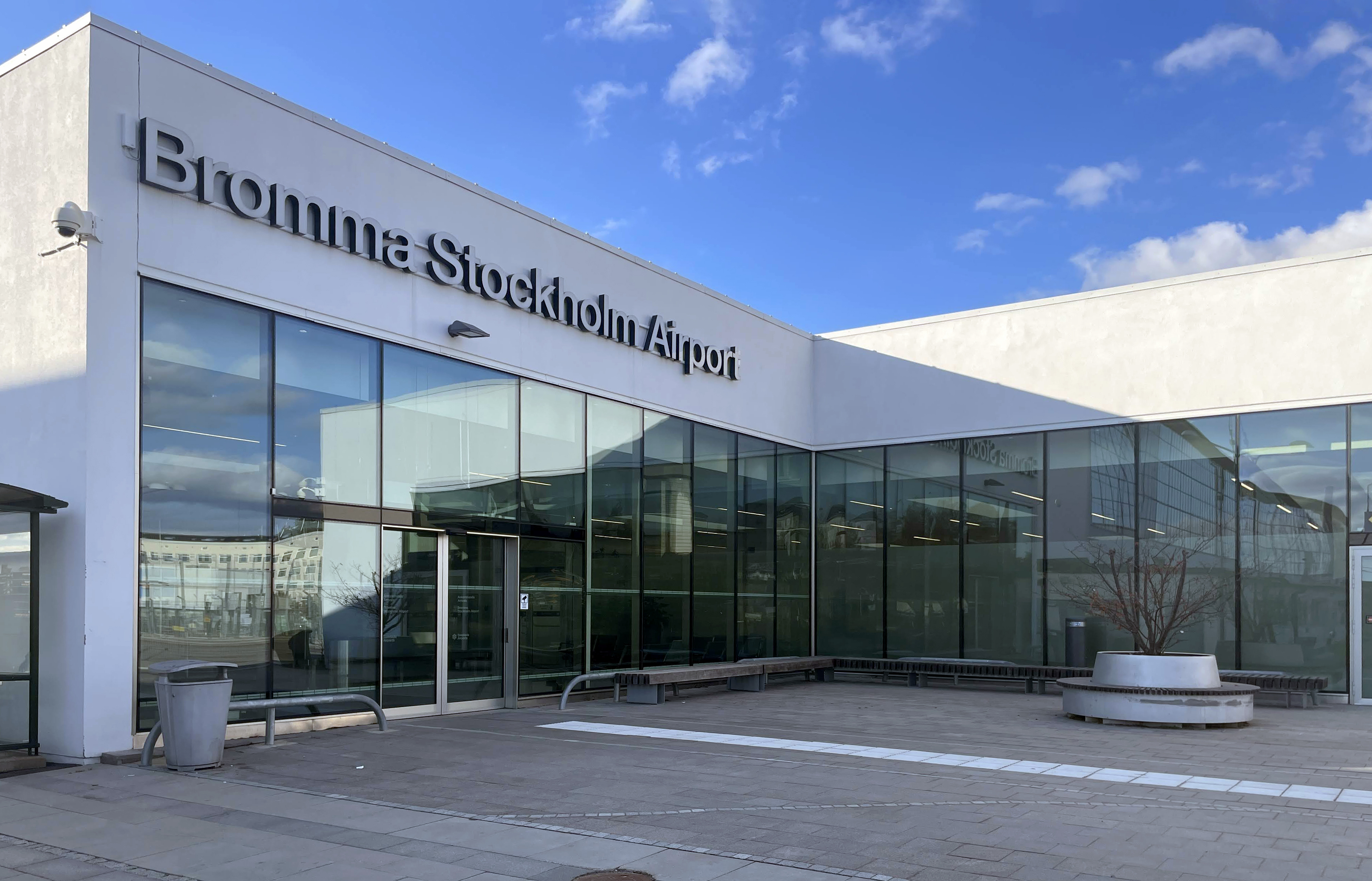
Arrivals entrance

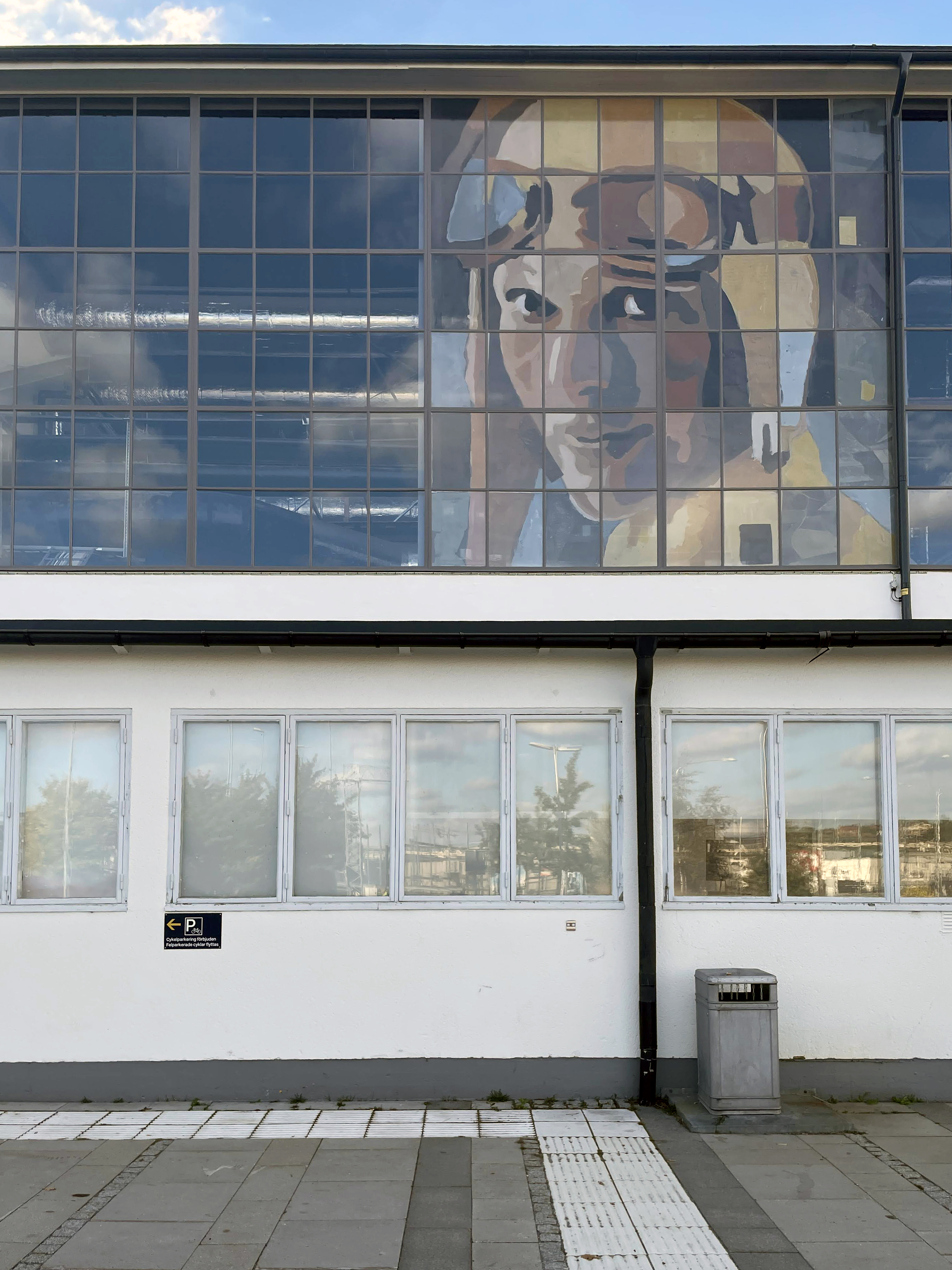
Artwork of Amelia Earhart by Catrine Näsmark

=== Commercial decline and future uncertainty (2024–present) ===
In September 2024, Braathens Regional Airlines announced it would cease operations at Stockholm Bromma Airport by the end of 2024 and relocate to Stockholm Arlanda Airport. The relocation is part of a seven-year contract with SAS, set to begin in 2025. BRA attributed the decision to the decline in domestic air traffic following the COVID-19 pandemic, which had made its operations at Bromma unsustainable. According to the Stockholm Chamber of Commerce, the decision means that Bromma will likely lose around 90% of its traffic, potentially hastening its closure.

In December 2024, Finnair announced that it would also end its flights to Bromma, leaving Västflyg's flight to Trollhättan-Vänersborg as the airport's only scheduled service. Swedavia confirmed a major reduction of operations at Bromma Stockholm Airport, with the workforce reduced from 120 to 41 employees. Approximately half of the displaced staff were offered positions at other Swedavia airports, primarily Arlanda airport.

From January 2025, Bromma will operate on a smaller scale, with operations reduced to focusing primarily on private and business jets. ST-Luftfart, a union representing aviation employees, stated that Bromma will resemble more of an airfield than an airport. In December 2024, the Swedish Armed Forces confirmed that a closure of Bromma would not have any consequences for national defence.

In early 2025, it was reported that private and business jets had accounted for 89% of all passenger aircraft landings at Bromma Airport in January and February. According to reports, many of the private flights were used for leisure travel, such as skiing trips to Switzerland, and many flights were operating with few or no passengers.

== Future plans ==
Stockholm Bromma Airport is located on land owned by the City of Stockholm but is operated by Swedavia under a lease agreement with the city. The lease was last renewed in 2011, when the centre-right majority in the Stockholm City Council voted to extend it until 2038. Under the terms of the current lease, by that deadline, the airport must be decommissioned, and the surrounding land must have undergone environmental remediation to remove contamination. Several groups have expressed desires for Stockholm Bromma Airport to close sooner than the current 2038 lease expiration.

=== Constraints on expansion ===
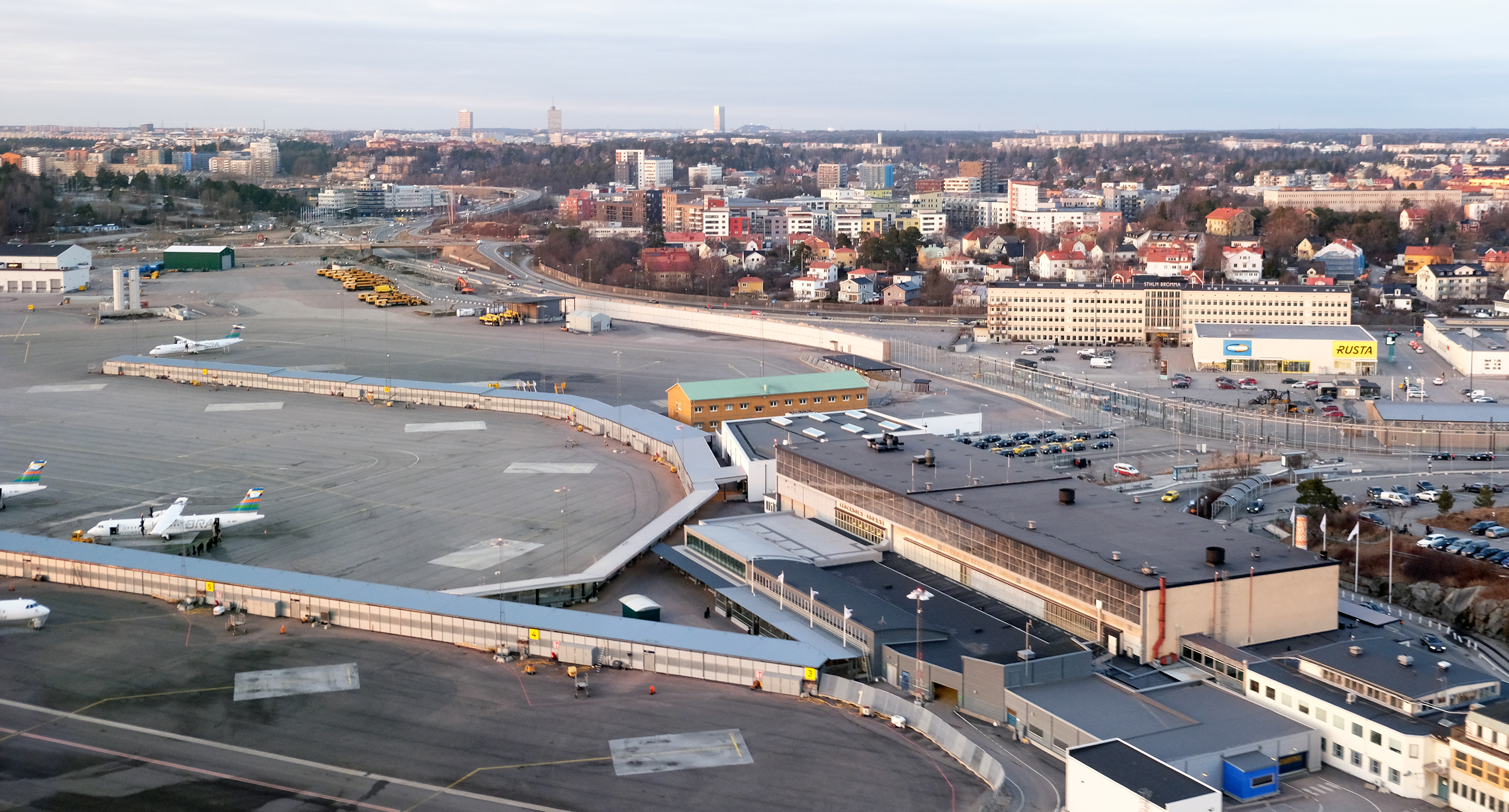
The airport is in close proximity to built-up areas

Its location limits Stockholm Bromma Airport's potential for expansion because of several factors, including noise regulations, spatial constraints, and the obligation to preserve the culturally significant airport buildings. When the airport was inaugurated in 1936, it was located in a largely rural area. However, as Stockholm has expanded, the airport is now surrounded by urban development.

The airport is required to operate under strict restrictions to minimise impact on the surrounding area. Noise levels must not exceed 55 and 65 dBA in designated areas, and the airport is limited to 80,000 flight movements per year by its lease with the City of Stockholm. Average noise emissions must remain below 89 EPNdB, while scheduled flights face a stricter limit of 86 EPNdB. Flight operations are prohibited between 22:00 and 07:00 on weekdays and before 08:00 on weekends except for emergency and governmental flights.

=== Commercial viability ===
Both Stockholm Bromma Airport and Stockholm Arlanda Airport are both managed by government-owned airport operator Swedavia. While Bromma's close proximity to central Stockholm has been a significant advantage, the expansion of Arlanda, including the completion of the high-speed Arlanda Express rail link in 1999 and addition of a third runway in 2003, has diminished Bromma Airport's competitive position.

On 14 September 2020, Swedavia submitted a report to Sweden's Ministry of Enterprise and Innovation regarding the operational viability of Stockholm Bromma Airport. The report concluded that maintaining operations at both Bromma and Arlanda was no longer commercially justified. Swedavia recommended consolidating air traffic at Arlanda, which it concluded could accommodate Bromma's capacity without requiring substantial infrastructure investments in the short term. It noted that long-term enhancements, including the potential construction of an additional runway at Arlanda, would still be necessary. The report indicated that Bromma was unlikely to remain operational beyond 2038.

In September 2024, BRA's main owner, Per G. Braathen, announced that operating from Bromma had become unprofitable and that BRA would leave by late 2024. The Stockholm Chamber of Commerce welcomed the decision and stated it likely signifies the end of Bromma's commercial viability. The Chamber stated that Bromma should be closed promptly, as it had been operating at a loss and relies on revenue from Arlanda and emphasised its desire to have resources redirected towards the development of Arlanda instead. Finnair also terminated its flights to Helsinki Airport, the airport's sole international route, on 31 December 2024, citing unprofitability.

As of December 2024, Swedavia has communicated to the Swedish government that it no longer sees a viable future for Bromma Airport, citing persistently low capacity utilisation and a lack of financial justification for its continued operation within the framework of the national aviation network. Bromma Airport’s continued operations are estimated to cost at least one billion SEK (€87 million) annually for Swedavia, with the costs of operating Bromma subsidised by passenger fees other Swedavia airports.

=== Political debate ===
The airport has been a subject of political debate for much of its history. Proponents argue that the airport is necessary to complement Stockholm Arlanda Airport and that it contributes to the region's air capacity and business activity. Critics argue that the region requires only one airport and advocate for the repurposing of the approximately 142 hectares of land occupied by Bromma for housing development.

After the 2014 general election in which Red-Green Alliance gained control of both Stockholm City Council and the national government, plans emerged to close Bromma Airport to redevelop the area for housing. On 14 September 2020, Swedavia submitted a report concluding that maintaining operations at Bromma was no longer commercially justified. This finding bolstered the government's position, which in April 2021, announced renewed plans to proceed with the airport's closure, aiming to free up space for residential projects. A subsequent government report released in October 2021 suggested a closure timeline between 2025 and 2027, with all air traffic being consolidated at Arlanda.

However, after the 2022 general election, which was won by the right-wing Moderate-led bloc, the newly formed Kristersson cabinet announced that plans to close Bromma early would not proceed. Instead, the government indicated its ambition that the airport could be developed to support electric-powered aircraft.

In February 2024, Stockholm City Council's Social Democrat-led leadership confirmed it would not renew Bromma Airport's lease beyond 2038 and declared its intent to terminate the agreement with Swedavia regarding Bromma and its aim to establish a new urban district called "Bromma Parkstad". Christian Democratic Infrastructure Minister Andreas Carlson countered that the government would not accept an early termination of the agreement.

In September 2024, Braathens Regional Airlines announced that it would cease operations at Bromma by the end of 2024. Upon this announcement, Swedavia's CEO, Jonas Abrahamsson, described BRA's decision to shift operations to Arlanda as a natural development, reinforcing the need for a political discussion about Bromma's future.

In December 2024, Infrastructure Minister Andreas Carlson reiterated that no decision to close Bromma would be made during the current government, as both the government and the Sweden Democrats, under the terms of the Tidö Agreement, insisted that the airport should remain operational.

== Airlines and destinations ==
The following airlines operate regular scheduled and charter flights at Stockholm Bromma:

Airlines	Destinations
BrommaFlyg	Visby
Skåne Aviation	Malmö
VästFlyg	Trollhättan, Växjö

== Statistics ==
=== Routes ===
Busiest routes to and from Stockholm Bromma Airport (2025)
Rank	Airport	Passengers handled
1	Trollhättan	13,266
2	Växjö	5,991
3	Visby	4,072
4	Arvidsjaur	198
5	Trondheim	134
6	Linköping	116
7	Nice	65
8	Helsinki	63
9	Östersund	56
10	Oslo	54

=== Passengers ===
Traffic by calendar year
Year	Passenger volume	Change	Domestic	Change	International	Change
2025	25,232	▼97.5%	23,799	▼97.5%	1,433	▼97.0%
2024	1,007,470	▼14.9%	960,096	▼5.3%	47,374	▼72.2%
2023	1,184,293	▲6.2%	1,013,788	▲5.0%	170,505	▲14.3%
2022	1,114,950	▲96.7%	965,823	▲93.1%	149,127	▲124.4%
2021	566,698	▲18.4%	500,239	▲23.5%	66,459	▼9.6%
2020	478,680	▼79.7%	405,139	▼79.7%	73,541	▼79.5%
2019	2,352,517	▼6.0%	1,993,826	▼9.1%	358,691	▲16.1%
2018	2,501,589	▼1.4%	2,192,510	▼2.4%	309,079	▲6.9%
2017	2,535,859	▲1.2%	2,246,625	▲0.9%	289,234	▲3.2%
2016	2,506,543	▲0.6%	2,226,383	▲1.5%	280,160	▼5.9%
2015	2,491,465	▲4.7%	2,193,586	▲3.0%	297,879	▲19.5%
2014	2,379,752	▲4.4%	2,130,450	▲5.2%	249,302	▼1.6%
2013	2,279,566	▼0.7%	2,026,100	▲0.7%	253,466	▼10.7%
2012	2,294,897		2,011,083		283,814	

== Other facilities ==
Stockholm Bromma Airport is home of two flight clubs (Stockholms Flygklubb and SAS Flygklubb), as well as a flight school (LidAir). The state aviation, which operates VIP flights for the ministers of the government, the royal family and other high ranked government officials, is based at Bromma Airport.

== Ground transport ==
Bromma flygplats tram stop

General information
- Operator: SL
- Line: Tvärbanan line 31

Services
Preceding station	SL Local & Light Rail	Following station
Terminus	Tvärbanan Line 31	Bromma blocks towards Alviks strand
Location

=== Tram ===
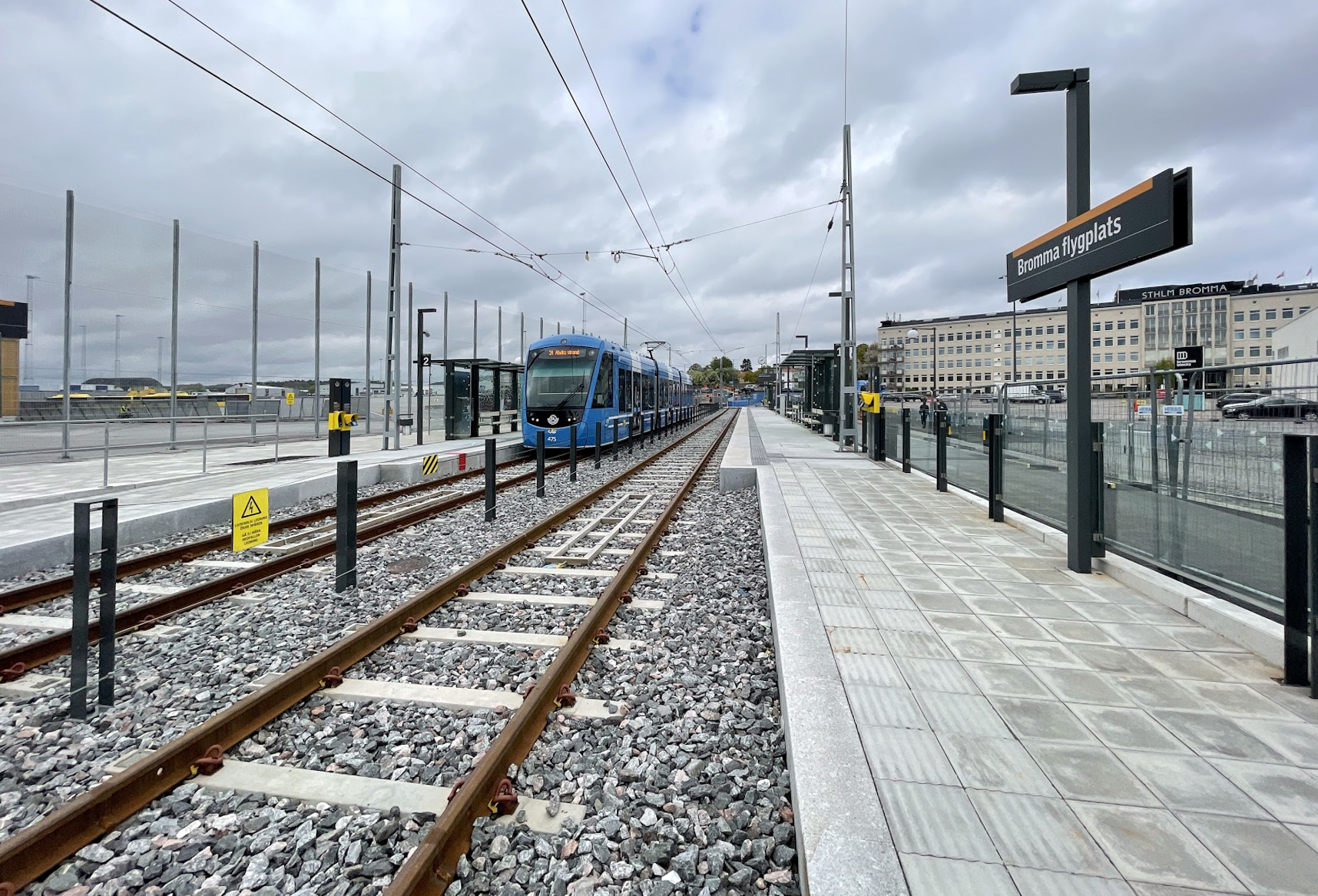
Tram stop at Bromma Airport

Tram services from Bromma Airport connect the airport to Alvik, where passengers can transfer to the Stockholm Metro. The tram stop at the airport is called Bromma flygplats, and the journey to Alvik takes approximately 9 minutes.

The tram line, known as the Tvärbanan (Line 31), was inaugurated in May 2021. Currently an extension of the Tvärbanan line is under construction, which will extend northward from to Rissne, Kista, and ultimately to Helenelund Station.

=== Taxi ===
Bromma Airport features a taxi stand outside the terminals that exclusively serves 'ecotaxis' as part of its environmental initiatives. The airport is located approximately 7.4 kilometers from central Stockholm, with typical taxi rides taking around 20 minutes.

=== Parking ===
Bromma Airport offers parking managed by Swedavia. The main facilities include Express Outdoor Parking (P2) near the terminal and a pick-up and drop-off area limited to one-hour stays. The airport also provides designated parking for electric vehicles, motorcycles, and passengers with reduced mobility. Leased parking is available for frequent travellers. The parking areas are open 24 hours a day

== Accidents and incidents ==
- On 18 February 1951, a RAF Vickers Valetta with 22 passengers and crew on a military flight suffered a failure of the No. 2 engine and radio problems while near Stockholm/Bromma Airport. Smoke was also seen coming from beneath the floor of the rear of the cabin. The crew attempted to make an emergency landing at the airport, however due to poor alignment with the runway and poor weather caused the aircraft to overshoot the runway. The aircraft climbed very poorly due to effects of airframe icing and the pilot made a forced belly landing on a clearing on high ground. One person was killed and the aircraft totally destroyed.
- On 1 April 1951, a Scandinavian Airlines Douglas DC-3 on a flight from Copenhagen Kastrup Airport to Stockholm Bromma Airport crash-landed in a field near the airport. None of the 18 passengers or 4 crew members were killed, but the aircraft was a write-off.
- On 15 January 1977, Linjeflyg Flight 618, tail number SE-FOZ, crashed at Kälvesta on approach to Stockholm/Bromma due to ice accretion on the tailplane, leading to a loss of control. All 22 people on board were killed.

== See also ==
- List of airports in Sweden
- Swedavia
- Stockholm Arlanda Airport
- Stockholm Skavsta Airport
- Stockholm Västerås Airport
- List of the largest airports in the Nordic countries
- Bromma
- Swedish Civil Aviation Administration
