= Grafair =

Swedish aircraft operator

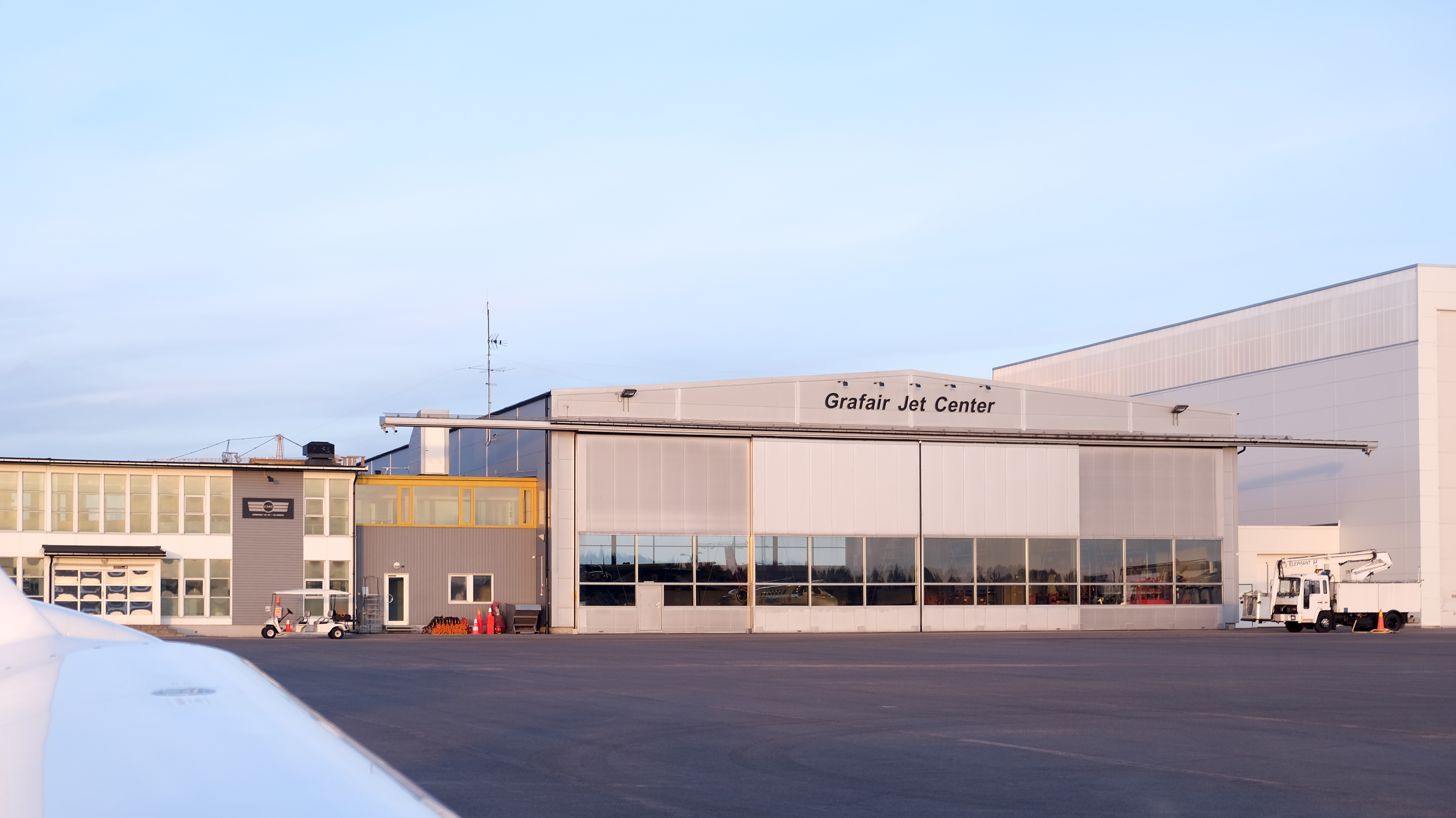
| IATA | ICAO | Call sign |
|---|---|---|
| — | GFM | PARROT |
- Founded: 1969; 57 years ago
- Fleet size: 5
- Headquarters: Stockholm-Bromma Airport, Sweden
- Key people: Bengt Grafström, Founder; Johan Emmoth, CEO
- Website: http://www.grafair.se/

Grafair, or Graf Air as it is sometimes spelt in the media, is a Swedish aviation company founded in 1969 by the famous Swedish aviator and entrepreneur, Bengt Grafström. Grafair is also represented in the US through the subsidiary Grafair Inc.

Grafair operates a fleet of business jets and amphibious aircraft. They offer air taxi/air charter, fractional jet ownership and air ambulance services.

Grafair founded the first privately owned and operated Fixed-Base Operation (FBO) in Sweden in 2004. The full-service FBO located at Stockholm-Bromma Airport was named the Grafair Jet Center. The Grafair Jet Center FBO were ranked in May 2008 as the third best international FBO. The following year, in May 2009, Grafair Jet Center were again placed as the 3rd best international FBO in the survey performed by AIN.

== Fleet ==
Grafair's aircraft fleet consists of (2024):

| Type | Registration | Passengers | Primarily used for |
|---|---|---|---|
| Hawker 800XP | SE-RLX | 8+1 | Air Charter/Air Taxi |
| Hawker 900XP | SE-RLY | 8+1 | Air Charter/Air Taxi |
| Hawker 900XP | SE-RLZ | 8+1 | Air Charter/Air Taxi |
| Cessna 560 Citation Ultra | SE-RLU | 7+1 | Air ambulance |
| Cessna 560 Citation Ultra | SE-RLT | 7+1 | Air ambulance |
