= Trollhättan–Vänersborg Airport =

Trollhättan–Vänersborg Airport Göteborg Stallbacka Airport

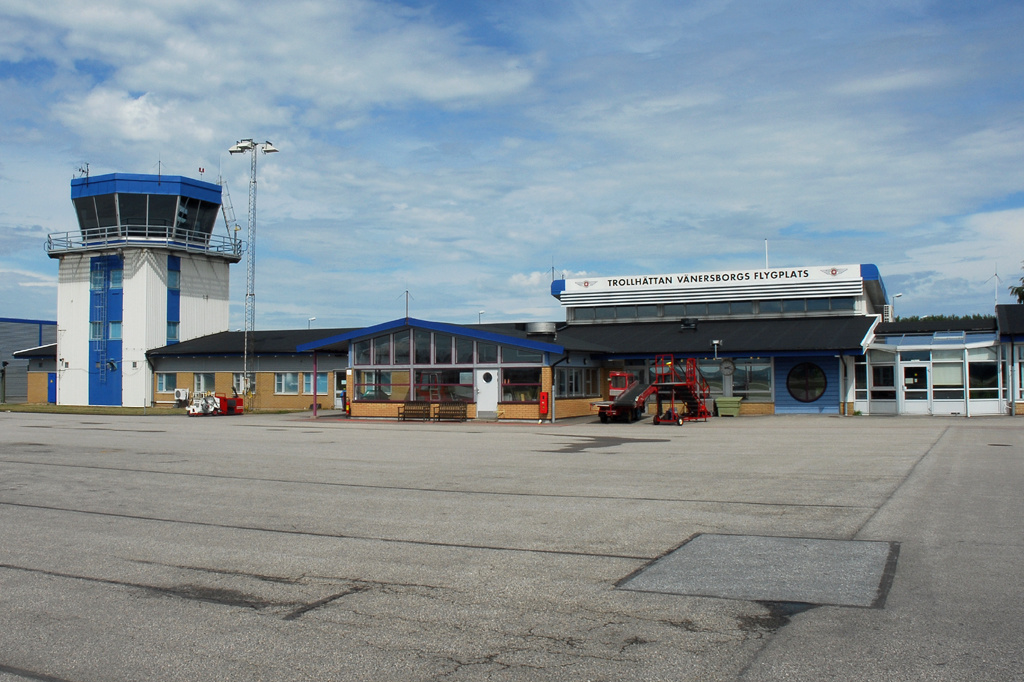
- IATA: THN; ICAO: ESGT

Summary
- Airport type: Public
- Owner: Trollhättan Municipality (49%); Vänersborg Municipality (34%); Uddevalla Municipality (16%); Lysekil Municipality (1%)
- Operator: Fyrstads Flygplats AB
- Location: Trollhättan and Vänersborg Municipalities
- Elevation AMSL: 42 m (138 ft)
- Coordinates: 58°19′27″N 012°20′11″E
- Website: fyrstadsflyget.se

Map
- Location within Sweden

Runways
Direction	Length		Surface
Direction	m	ft	Surface
15/33	1,710	5,610	Asphalt

Statistics (2018)
- Passengers total: 44,662
- International passengers: 826
- Domestic passengers: 43,836
- Landings total: 3377

Trollhättan–Vänersborg Airport (IATA: THN, ICAO: ESGT) also known as Trollhättan Airport is a regional airport located in Västra Götaland County, Sweden. It is located 5 kilometres (3.1 mi) northeast of central Trollhättan and 8 kilometres (5.0 mi) southeast of Vänersborg.

The airport's municipal owner, Fyrstads Flygplats AB, has branded the airport as Göteborg Stallbacka Airport since 2024, reflecting its proximity to Gothenburg, which is approximately 80 kilometers (50 miles) to the southwest. The airport opened in 1937 and is colloquially known as Malöga Airport.

== History ==
The airport was established in 1937 when Saab AB acquired land in Malöga for a factory and airfield. It initially served military purposes during World War II, producing aircraft for the Swedish Air Force. The airport transitioned to civilian use in 1974 with the opening of a new terminal and runway. The airport's runway crosses the municipal border between Trollhättan and Vänersborg, while the terminal and hangars are situated in Vänersborg.

In 1983, the municipalities of Trollhättan, Vänersborg, Uddevalla, and Lysekil formed Fyrstads flygplats AB, which expanded the runway to 1,710 meters. Over the years, the airport operated routes to various destinations, including Stockholm and Copenhagen. However, economic challenges led to service reductions, particularly after 2008. After a two-year pause due to the COVID-19 pandemic, regular flights resumed in 2022.

In March 2022, virtual airline Västflyg commenced operations connecting Trollhättan–Vänersborg with Stockholm Bromma Airport using an aircraft operated by NyxAir. By October 2024, the airline had expanded routes from Trollhättan–Vänersborg to include Stockholm Arlanda and a seasonal service to Scandinavian Mountains Airport.

=== Naming ===
On 30 August 2024, it was announced that the airport would be rebranded as Göteborg Stallbacka Airport. The new name incorporates "Göteborg" (Gothenburg) to associate the airport with Sweden's second-largest city, located about 80 kilometers away.

Airport officials stated that the rebranding aims to better position the airport within Gothenburg's labour market area and potentially attract more flights and passengers. Local media reported that the new name was criticised, with concerns about losing local identity, along with concerns about possible confusion for travellers regarding the airport's location relative to Gothenburg.

Until 2025, the airport's official name, registered with the Swedish Transport Agency, remained Trollhättan-Vänersborg.

== Airlines and destinations ==
The following airlines operate regular scheduled and charter flights at Trollhättan–Vänersborg Airport:

Airlines	Destinations
Västflyg	Stockholm–Bromma Seasonal: Sälen-Trysil, Visby

== Ground transport ==
The airport offers parking with electric vehicle charging stations, as well as bicycle parking, near the terminal building. The airport is not served by public transport.
