= Swedavia =

Swedish state-owned airport operating company

Swedavia AB
- Type: Aktiebolag
- Predecessor: Swedish Civil Aviation Administration
- Founded: 1 April 2010
- Headquarters: Stockholm, Stockholm-Arlanda Airport; Sigtuna Municipality, Sweden
- Owner: Swedish Government (100%)
- Number of employees: 3074 (2018)
- Website: swedavia.com

Swedavia's Airports in Sweden

Swedavia AB is a Swedish state-owned company, which owns and operates ten of Sweden's busiest airports. It has its head office at the air traffic control tower of Stockholm-Arlanda Airport in Sigtuna Municipality near Stockholm.

It was formed on 1 April 2010, when the Swedish Civil Aviation Administration was split up, and all commercial airport operation was transferred to Swedavia. Air navigation services continue as a state enterprise under the name LFV (Civil Aviation Administration). In 2010, the number of employees was about 2,600.

== Airports ==
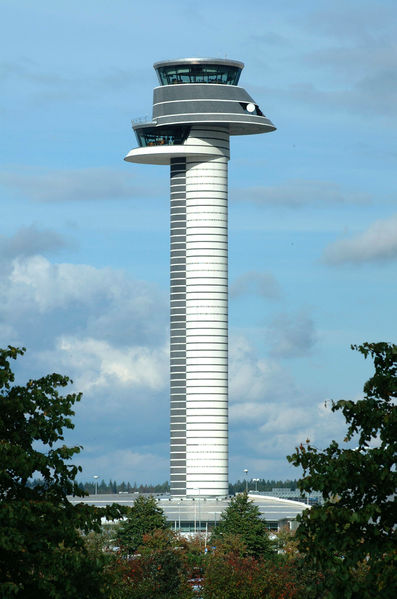
Control tower at Stockholm-Arlanda Airport, which has the Swedavia AB head office

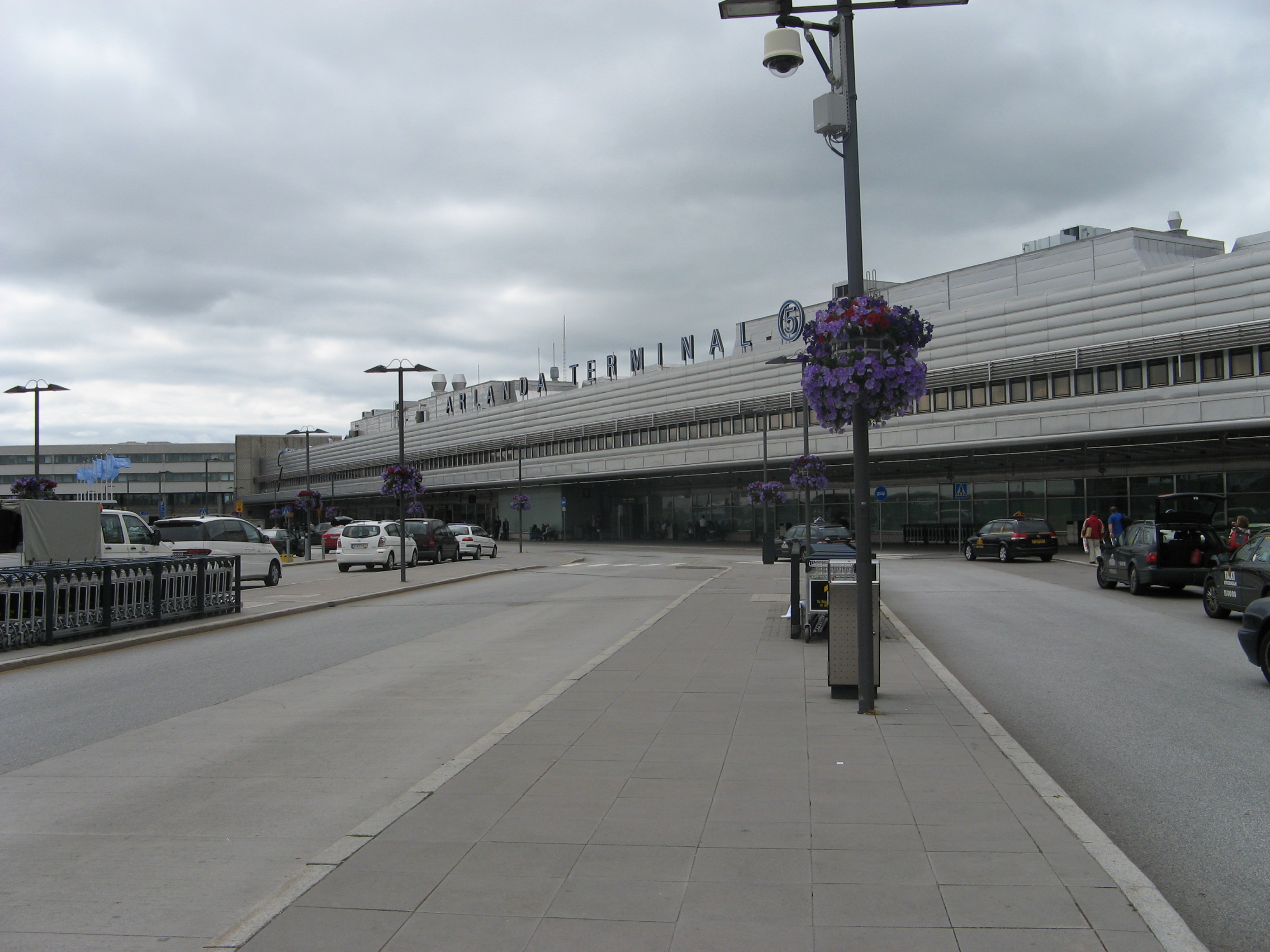
Arlanda Airport is operated by Swedavia.

Swedavia owns and operates:
- Åre Östersund Airport (OSD)
- Göteborg Landvetter Airport (GOT)
- Kiruna Airport (KRN)
- Luleå Airport (LLA)
- Malmö Airport (MMX)
- Ronneby Airport (RNB)
- Stockholm Arlanda Airport (ARN)
- Stockholm Bromma Airport (BMA)
- Umeå Airport (UME)
- Visby Airport (VBY)

When the decision was made to form Swedavia, there were 16 nationally owned airports, but it was a part of the decision to transfer six of them to local owners and keep ten large airports. Region Värmland took over the operations of Karlstad Airport in 2010. In 2011, the operations for Ängelholm-Helsingborg Airport was transferred to Region Skåne Nordväst and Örnsköldsvik Airport was transferred to Örnsköldsvik Municipality. In 2013 Sundsvall Airport was transferred to local owners. Jönköping Airport and Skellefteå Airport were transferred to local ownership 2009/2010 before Swedavia was formed.

In December 2024, Swedavia communicated to the Swedish government that it no longer sees a viable future for Stockholm Bromma Airport, citing persistently low capacity utilisation and a lack of financial justification for its continued operation. Bromma Airport's continued operations are estimated to cost at least one billion SEK (€87 million) annually for Swedavia, with the costs of operating Bromma subsidised by passenger fees from other Swedavia airports.

== Key figures ==
	2015	2016
Net revenue (million)	5,416	5,546
Operating profit	0,966	1,755
Passengers (million)	37.6	39.5
Employees	2,787	2,949
