= Civil Aviation Administration (Sweden) =

Swedish Government agency

The Swedish Civil Aviation Administration (Swedish: Luftfartsverket) is a Swedish government agency which regulated and oversaw all aspects of aviation in Sweden until 2005. The regulatory division was called Luftfartsstyrelsen (Civil Aviation Authority).

The Air Navigation Service Provider (ANSP) (Flygtrafiktjänsten) was established as Luftfartsverket (LFV). The agency had its head office in Norrköping.

In 2005 the regulatory division was separated to a new agency named Luftfartsstyrelsen, from 2009 part of the Swedish Transport Agency.

On 1 April 2010, the airport ownership and operation part of the Luftfartsverket was transferred to Swedish Airports (Swedavia AB), a newly formed fully state-owned company.

Air navigation services continue as a state enterprise under the name LFV.

== See also ==
- Air traffic control
- List of Swedish government enterprises
- List of airports in Sweden
- List of airports
