= Växjö-Kronoberg Airport =

Växjö-Kronoberg Airport Växjö-Kronobergs flygplats

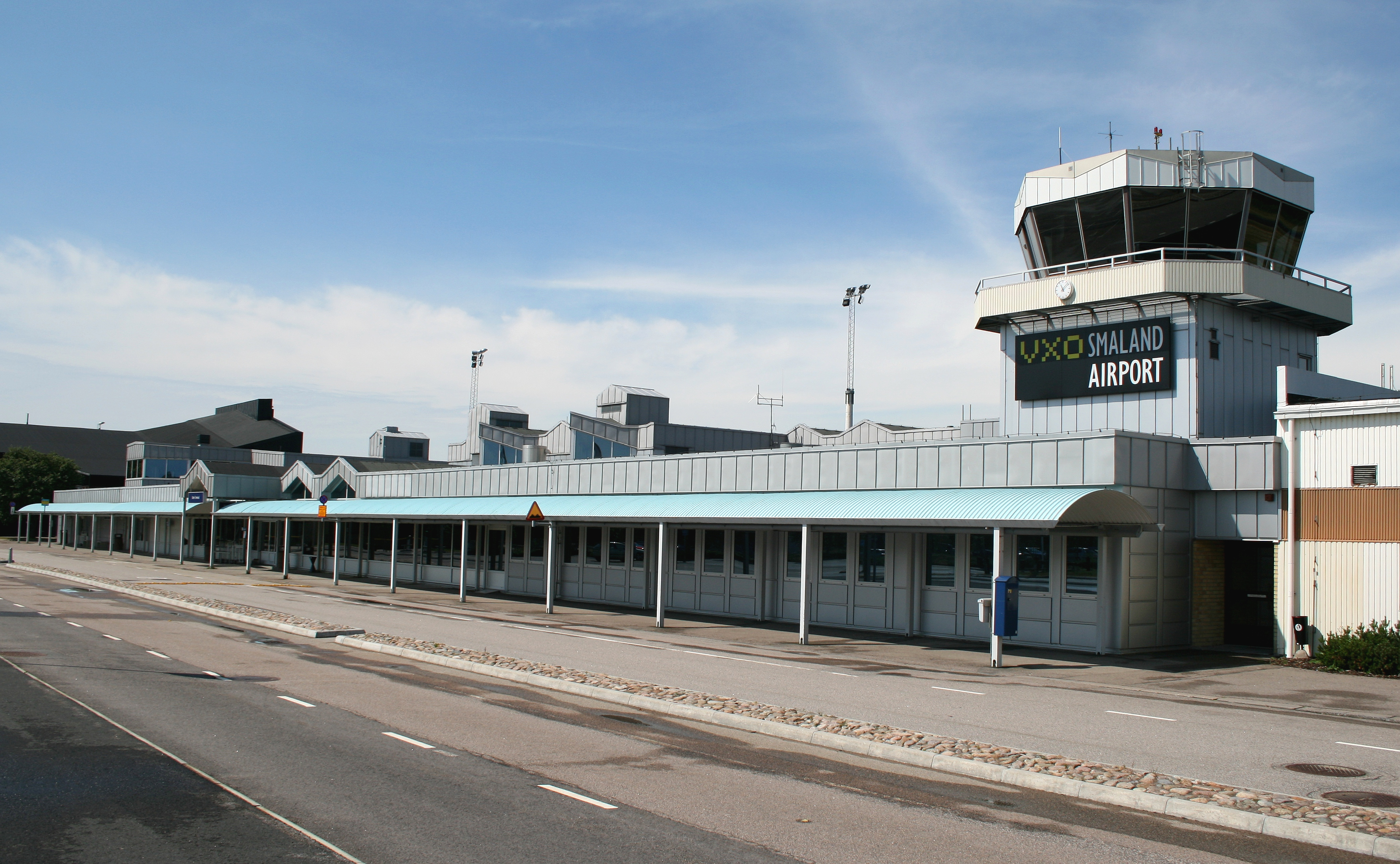
- IATA: VXO; ICAO: ESMX

Summary
- Airport type: Public
- Operator: Växjö Småland Airport AB
- Serves: Växjö
- Location: Växjö
- Elevation AMSL: 186 m (610 ft)
- Coordinates: 56°55′44″N 14°43′40″E
- Website: smalandairport.se

Map
- Location within Kronoberg County VXO (Sweden)

Runways
Direction	Length		Surface
Direction	m	ft	Surface
01/19	2,103	6,900	Asphalt

Statistics (2016)
- Passengers total: 172 353
- International passengers: 98 719
- Domestic passengers: 73 674
- Aircraft movements total: 4 332
- Statistics: Swedish Transport Agency

Växjö-Kronoberg Airport (IATA: VXO, ICAO: ESMX), branded as Växjö Småland Airport, is an airport in Kronoberg county, Sweden. The airport is located about 10 kilometres (6 mi) northwest of central Växjö. The airport is owned by Kronoberg county and Växjö municipality. A small share is held by Alvesta municipality.

== History ==
Scheduled aviation from Växjö started around 1960 from Uråsa airbase, 20 km (10 miles) south of Växjö. A larger airport was needed, so it was built at its present location in 1975.

Traffic went mainly to Stockholm from the start. After 2007, international traffic greatly increased with low price airlines like Ryanair and Wizzair. Charter flights to Southern Europe and the Canary Islands have also increased.

In April 2020, the Stockholm route was cancelled due to the COVID-19 pandemic, but was restarted in August 2021. The alternative route to Stockholm is by train (3½ hours) or a flight from Kalmar, the nearest airport with regular flights to Stockholm.

== Airlines and destinations ==
The following airlines operate regular scheduled and charter flights at Växjö-Kronoberg Airport:

Airlines	Destinations
GP Aviation	Pristina
Norwegian Air Shuttle	Seasonal: Alicante, Málaga, Palma de Mallorca
Ryanair	Alicante; Seasonal: Gdańsk
Sunclass Airlines	Seasonal charter: Larnaca, Rhodes
TUI fly Nordic	Seasonal charter: Gran Canaria (resumes 23 October 2026)
VästFlyg	Stockholm–Bromma

== See also ==
- List of the busiest airports in the Nordic countries
