= NyxAir =

Airline based in Estonia

NyxAir OÜ
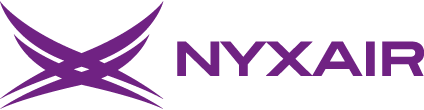

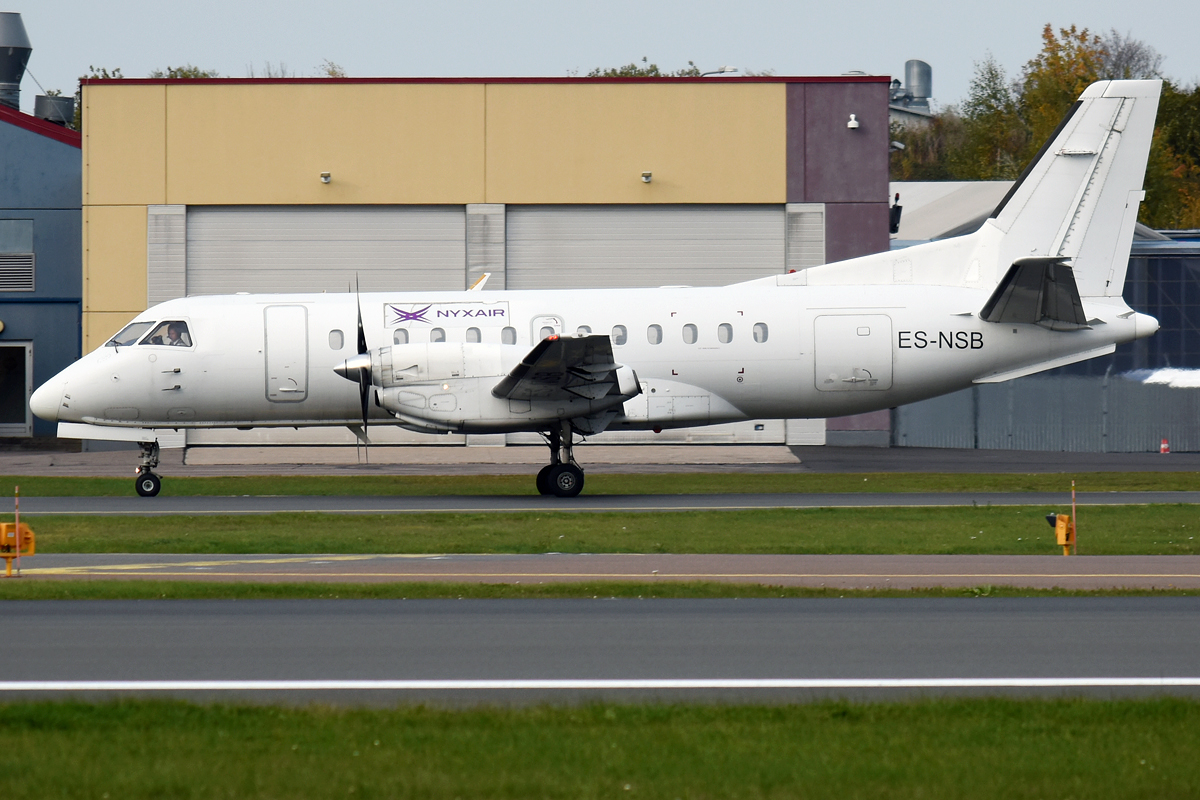
- Saab 340A
IATA	ICAO	Call sign
OJ	NYX	NYX AIR
- Founded: 2017; 9 years ago
- Hubs: Tallinn Airport
- Fleet size: 12
- Destinations: 12
- Headquarters: Tallinn, Estonia
- Key people: Jaanus Ojamets (CEO)
- Website: flynyx.com

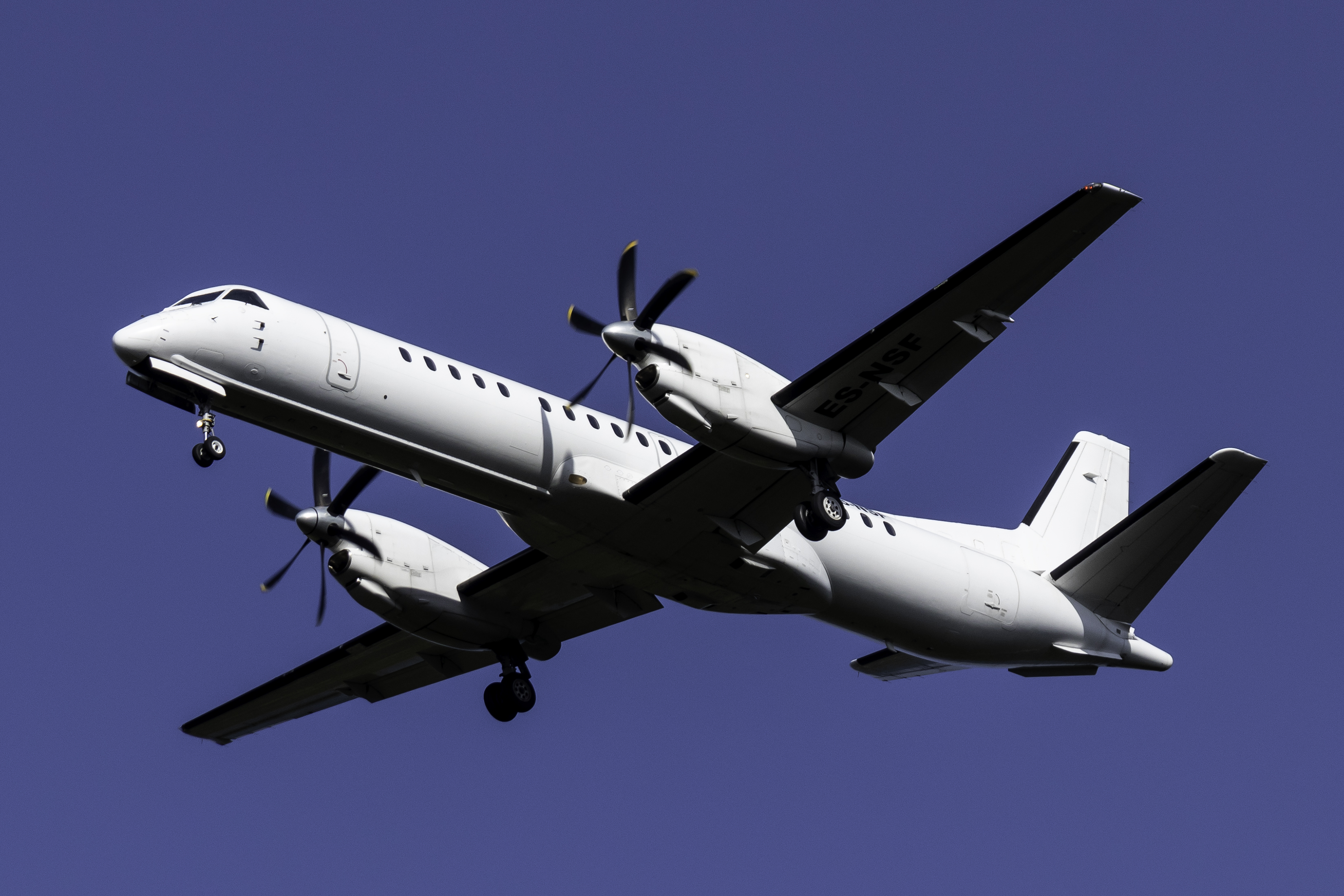
NyxAir Saab 2000

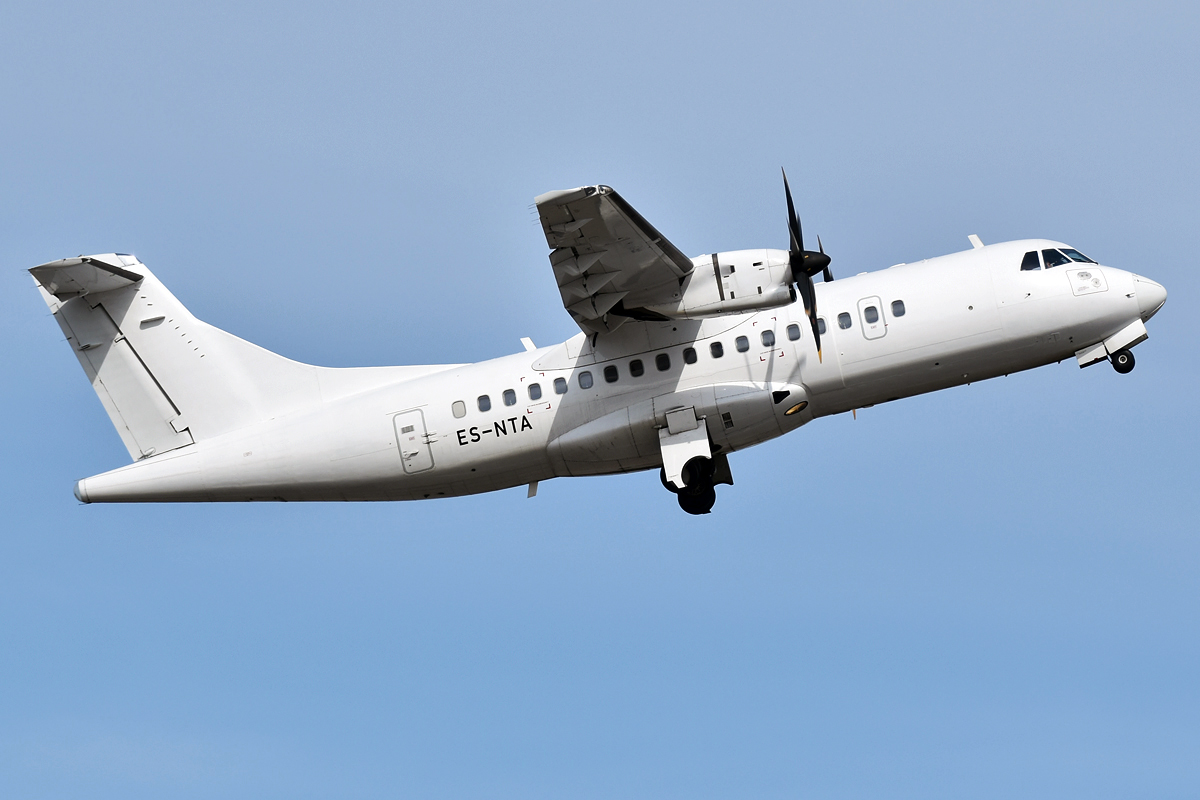
ATR 42-500

NyxAir OÜ is an Estonian regional airline headquartered in Tallinn operating scheduled and charter passenger and cargo flights.

== History ==
NyxAir was founded in Autumn 2017 and on 7 June 2018, the Estonian Transport Agency issued its Air Operator Certificate (AOC). Flying operations started in December 2020.

== Destinations ==
The airline mainly performs short-term charters, but has also in 2020 and 2021 won government procurements and wet-lease contracts to fly domestic flights in Estonia, Finland and Sweden. In Estonia, the company started flights between Tallinn and Kuressaare on the island Saaremaa in December 2020 and between Tallinn and Kärdla in Hiiumaa from 1 March 2024. In Finland, the company runs flights from Helsinki to Jakobstad - Kokkola, Savonlinna, Kemi and Jyväskylä since May 2021. NyxAir has also flown domestic flights in Sweden on behalf of Air Leap. Since March 2022 it flies from Stockholm-Bromma to Trollhättan on behalf of the Swedish local airline Västflyg. In addition, cargo flights in central Europe are operated.

== Fleet ==
=== Current fleet ===
As of July 2026, NyxAir operates the following aircraft:

NyxAir fleet
Aircraft	In service	Orders	Passengers	Notes
ATR 42-500	2	—		
ATR 72-500F	1	—		
Saab 340A	1	—		
Saab 340AF	2	—		
Saab 340B	4	—		
Saab 340BF	2	—		
Total	12			

=== Former fleet ===
As of July 2025, NyxAir also had:

- 1 ATR 72-212A (ES-NTC/541)

As of September 2024, Nyxair's fleet consisted of the following aircraft: (Registration/Serial number):

- 2 ATR 42-500 (ES-NTA/655, ES-NTB/651)
- 6 Saab 340 (ES-NSB/112, ES-NSM/113, ES-NSN/082, ES-NSC/248, ES-NSK/169, ES-NSL/162)
