= List of airports in Sweden =

This is a list of airports in Sweden, sorted by location.

== Airports ==
Airport names shown in bold indicate the airport has scheduled service on commercial airlines. Airport names that are not bold but have an IATA code have previously had scheduled service.

Ten of the most important airports are owned by the national company Swedavia. The other airports which have scheduled service, are in general owned by the city concerned.

Most air routes inside Sweden are going to and from Stockholm. The shorter connections are mostly used by business travellers, since there is strong competition from rail and road travel. For the longest routes (Stockholm–Umeå and longer) air travel is the main mode of travel also for leisure travellers.

For international travel, Arlanda is the hub for the Stockholm region and places north thereof. For southbound or westbound international travel from places in Sweden well south of Stockholm, Copenhagen is the hub. From Gothenburg, some main airports of Europe can be directly reached and be used as hubs.

City served	ICAO	IATA	Airport name	Usage	Runway(s)	Passengers (2023)
Alingsås	ESGI		Alingsås Airport	Public	01/19, 800 m, Grass	
Anderstorp	ESMP		Anderstorp Airport	Public	04/22, 1000 m, Asphalt	
Arboga	ESQO		Arboga Airport	Public	15/33, 2000 m, Asphalt	
Arbrå	ESUB		Arbrå Airport	Public	18/36, 700 m, Grass	
Arvidsjaur	ESNX	AJR	**Arvidsjaur Airport**	Public	12/30, 2500 m, Asphalt	55,355
Arvika	ESKV		Arvika–Westlanda Airport	Public	01/19, 1150 m, Asphalt	
Avesta	ESVA		Avesta Airport	Public	15/33, 850 m, Grass	
Berga	ESQP		Berga Airport	Military	183 m, Paved	
Björkvik	ESKX		Björkvik Airbase (closed)	Military	2000 m, Paved	
Boden	ESPG		Boden Army Airbase (closed)	Military	406 m, Paved	
Borgholm	ESMB		Borglanda Airport	Public	03/21, 625 m, Grass	
Borlänge	ESSD	BLE	Borlänge Airport (Dala Airport)	Public	14/32, 2310 m, Asphalt	10,375
Borås	ESGE		Viared Airport	Public	04/22, 800 m, Asphalt	
Brattforsheden	ESSM		Brattforsheden Airport	Public	08/26, 800 m, Grass	
Bunge	ESVB		Bunge Airbase	Military	09/27, 675 m, Asphalt; 16/34, 675 m, Asphalt	
Byholma	ESFY		Byholma Airbase (closed)	Military	12/30, 2300 m, Asphalt	
Dala-Järna	ESKD		Dala-Järna Airport	Public	03/21, 900 m, Asphalt	
Edsbyn	ESUY		Edsbyn Airport	Public	11/29, 700 m, Grass	
Ekshärad	ESKH		Ekshärad Airport	Public	15/33, 540 m, Grass	
Eksjö	ESMC		Ränneslätt Airport	Public	01/19, 1000 m, Grass	
Emmaboda	ESMA		Emmaboda Airport	Public	01/19, 1300 m, Asphalt	
Eskilstuna	ESSC		Ekeby Airport	Public	05/23, 850 m, Grass; 17/35, 800 m, Grass	
Eskilstuna	ESSU	EKT	Eskilstuna Airport	Public	18/36, 1886 m, Asph./Conc.	
Eslöv	ESME		Eslöv Airport	Public	04/22, 630 m, Grass; 15/33, 650 m, Grass	
Skånes-Fagerhult	ESMF		Fagerhult Airport	Public	17/35, 530 m, Grass	
Falkenberg	ESGF		Morup Airport	Public	09/27, 700 m, Grass	
Falköping	ESGK		Falköping Airport	Public	04/22, 1316 m, Asphalt	
Fällfors	ESUF		Fällfors Airbase	Military	2000 m, Paved	
Färila	ESNF		Färila Airbase (closed)	Military	2000 m, Paved	
Fjällbacka	ESTF		Fjällbacka Airport	Public	06/24, 800 m, Grass	
Gagnef	ESVG		Gagnef Airport	Public	08/26, 600 m, Grass	
Gargnäs	ESUG		Gargnäs Airport	Public	17/35, 940 m, Grass	
Gimo	ESKA		Lunda Airfield	Public	05/23, 800 m, Paved	
Gothenburg	ESGG	GOT	**Göteborg Landvetter Airport**	Public	03/21, 3299 m, Paved	5,192,054
Gothenburg	ESGP	GSE	Göteborg City Airport (Säve)	Public	01/19, 2039 m, Asphalt; 04/22, 871 m, Asphalt closed	
Gryttjom	ESKG		Gryttjom Airport	Public	18/36, 900 m, Grass	
Grönhögen	ESTG		Grönhögen Airport	Private	01/19, 800 m, Grass	
Gällivare	ESNG	GEV	**Gällivare Airport**	Public	12/30, 1714 m, Asphalt	26,888
Gävle / Sandviken	ESSK	GVX	Gävle–Sandviken Airport	Public	18/36, 2000 m, Asphalt	
Götene	ESGN		Brännebrona Airport	Public	12/30, 600 m, Grass	
Hagfors	ESOH	HFS	**Hagfors Airport**	Public	18/36, 1509 m, Asphalt	2,460
Hagshult	ESMV		Hagshult Airbase	Military	04/22, 2050 m, Asphalt	
Hallviken	ESNA		Hallviken Airport	Public	14/32, 1000 m, Asphalt	
Halmstad	ESMT	HAD	**Halmstad City Airport**	Public	01/19, 2261 m, Asphalt	83,818
Hasslösa	ESFH		Hasslösa Airbase (closed)	Military	2000 m, Paved	
Hede	ESNC		Hedlanda Airport	Public	06/24, 1000 m, Asphalt	
Heden	ESPJ		Heden Airbase (closed)	Military	2000 m, Paved	
Hemavan	ESUT	HMV	**Hemavan Airport**	Public	15/33, 1472 m, Asphalt	15,307
Herrljunga	ESGH		Herrljunga Airport	Public	18/36, 900 m, Grass	
Hudiksvall	ESNH	HUV	Hudiksvall Airport	Public	12/30, 1320 m, Asphalt	
Hultsfred / Vimmerby	ESSF	HLF	Hultsfred–Vimmerby Airport	Public	12/30, 1945 m, Concrete	
Hällefors	ESVH		Hällefors Airport	Public	18/36, 720 m, Gravel	
Härnösand	ESUH		Myran Airport	Public	10/28, 800 m, Gravel	
Hässleholm	ESFA		Bokeberg Airport	Public	04R/22L, 830 m, Grass; 04L/22R, 1110 m, Grass	
Hässleholm	ESMD		Vankiva Airport	Private	15/33, 670 m, Unpaved	
Höganäs	ESMH		Höganäs Airport	Public	06/24, 510 m, Grass; 14/32, 800 m, Grass	
Idre	ESUE	IDB	Idre Airport	Private	15/33, 1558 m, Asphalt	
Jokkmokk	ESNJ		Jokkmokk Airbase	Military	14/32, 1311 m, Asphalt	
Jönköping	ESGJ	JKG	Jönköping Airport	Public	01/19, 2203 m, Asphalt; 11/29, 600 m, Grass	21,854
Kalixfors	ESUK		Kalixfors Army Airbase	Military	05/23, 900 m, Asphalt; 11/29, 880 m, Asphalt; 17/35, 1200 m, Asphalt	
Kalmar	ESMQ	KLR	**Kalmar Airport**	Public	16/34, 2050 m, Asphalt; 05/23, 980 m, Asphalt	113,488
Karlsborg	ESIA		Karlsborg Airbase	Military	06/24, 2300 m, Asphalt	
Karlskoga	ESKK	KSK	Karlskoga Airport	Public	03/21, 1499 m, Asphalt	
Karlstad	ESOK	KSD	**Karlstad Airport**	Public	03/21, 2516 m, Asphalt	20,463
Katrineholm	ESVK		Katrineholm Airport	Public	15/33, 700 m, Grass	
Kiruna	ESNQ	KRN	**Kiruna Airport**	Public	03/21, 2502 m, Asphalt	217,228
Knislinge	ESFI		Knislinge Airbase (closed)	Military	2100 m, Paved	
Kosta	ESFQ		Kosta Airbase	Military	2000 m, Paved	
Kramfors	ESNK	KRF	**Höga Kusten Airport** (Kramfors-Sollefteå)	Public	17/35, 2001 m, Asphalt	9,174
Kristianstad	ESMK	KID	Kristianstad Airport (Kristianstad Österlen Airport)	Public	01/19 2,215 m Asphalt	16,236
Kubbe	ESNI		Kubbe Airbase (closed)	Military	2300 m, Paved	
Kungsängen/Stockholm	ESVF		Frölunda Airport	Public	750 m, Grass	
Kågeröd	ESMJ		Kågeröd Airport	Public	11/29, 800 m, Grass	
Köping	ESVQ		Köping Airport	Public	07/25, 700 m, Grass	
Landskrona	ESML		Landskrona Airport	Public	12R/30L, 1180 m, Asphalt; 12L/30R, 1050 m, Grass	
Laxå	ESSH		Laxå Airport	Public	03/21, 900 m, Asphalt	
Lidköping	ESGL	LDK	Lidköping–Hovby Airport	Public	06/24, 1990 m, Asphalt	
Linköping	ESCF		Malmen Airbase	Military	01/19, 2214 m, Asphalt; 08/26, 1870 m, Asphalt	
Linköping	ESSL	LPI	**Linköping/Saab Airport**	Public	11/29, 2130 m, Asphalt	118,542
Ljungby	ESMG		Feringe Airport	Public	01/19, 1150 m, Asphalt	
Ljungbyhed	ESTL		Ljungbyhed Airport	Public	11L/29R, 2010 m, Asphalt; 11R/29L, 2214 m, Asphalt	
Ljusdal	ESUL		Ljusdal Airport	Public	09/27, 620 m, Grass	
Ludvika	ESSG		Ludvika Airport	Public	01/19, 819 m, Paved	
Luleå	ESPA	LLA	**Luleå/Kallax Airport**	Public/Mil.	14/32, 3350 m, Asphalt	1,035,925
Lund	ESMN		Lund Airport	Public	03/31, 630 m, Grass	
Lycksele	ESNL	LYC	**Lycksele Airport**	Public	14/32, 2090 m, Asphalt	17,216
Malmö	ESMS	MMX	**Malmö Airport**	Public	17/35, 2800 m, Asphalt; 11/29, 797 m, Asphalt	1,297,141
Malung	ESVM		Skinnlanda Airport	Public	16/34, 800 m, Asphalt	
Mellansel	ESUI		Mellansel Airport	Public	09/27, 795 m, Grass	
Mohed	ESUM		Mohed Airport	Public	12/30, 800 m, Asphalt	
Moholm	ESFM		Moholm Airbase (closed)	Military	2002 m, Paved	
Mora	ESKM	MXX	**Mora–Siljan Airport**	Public	16/34, 1814 m, Asphalt	766
Munkfors	ESKO		Munkfors Airport	Public	03/21, 700 m, Grass	
Norrköping	ESSP	NRK	**Norrköping Airport**	Public	09/27, 2203 m, Asphalt; 11/29, 600 m, Grass	64,829
Norrköping	ESCK		Bråvalla Airbase (closed)	Military	15/33, 2300 m, Asphalt	
Norrtälje	ESSN		Mellingeholm Airport	Public	07/25, 605 m, Asphalt	
Optand	ESNM		Optand Airport	Public	18/36, 1000 m, Asphalt; 15/33, 750 m, Grass	
Orsa	ESNR		Orsa Airport	Public	03/21, 1000 m, Asphalt; 15/33, 900 m, Grass	
Oskarshamn	ESMO	OSK	Oskarshamn Airport	Public	01/19, 1500 m, Asphalt	
Oviken	ESUO		Oviken Airport	Public	18/36, 900 m, Grass	
Pajala	ESUP	PJA	**Pajala Airport**	Public	11/29, 2302 m, Asphalt	9,206
Piteå	ESNP		Piteå Airport	Public	16/34, 1000 m, Asphalt	
Ramsele	ESUR		Ramsele Airport	Public	14/32, 740 m, Grass	
Ronneby	ESDF	RNB	**Ronneby Airport** (F 17)	Public/Mil.	01/19, 2331 m, Asphalt	110,663
Råda	ESFR		Råda Airbase	Military	18/36, 2000 m, Asphalt	
Sandvik	ESFS		Sandvik Airport	Public	17/35, 600 m, Grass	
Sättna	ESNT		Sättna Airbase (closed)	Military	2000 m, Paved	
Siljansnäs	ESVS		Siljansnäs Airport	Public	14R/32L, 850 m, Asphalt; 14L/32R, 850 m, Grass	
Sjöbo	ESFJ		Sjöbo Airbase (closed)	Military	2000 m, Paved	
Skellefteå	ESNS	SFT	**Skellefteå Airport**	Public	10/28, 2100 m, Asphalt	347,351
Skövde	ESGR	KVB	Skövde Airport	Public	01/19, 1736 m, Asphalt	
Smålandsstenar	ESMY		Smålandsstenar Airport	Public	04/22, 800 m, Asphalt	
Sollefteå	ESNB		Sollefteå Airport	Public	14/32, 820 m, Asphalt	
Stockholm / Nyköping	ESKN	NYO	**Stockholm–Skavsta Airport**	Public	08/26, 2878 m, Asphalt; 16/34, 2039 m, Asphalt	685,269
Stockholm / Västerås	ESOW	VST	**Stockholm–Västerås Airport** (Hasslo)	Public	01/19, 2581 m, Asphalt	83,587
Stockholm	ESCN		Tullinge Airport (closed)	Public	2347 m, Paved	
Stockholm	ESKB		Barkarby Airport (closed)	Public	06/24, 990 m, Asphalt	
Stockholm	ESSA	ARN	**Stockholm–Arlanda Airport**	Public	01L/19R, 3301 m, Conc./Asph. 01R/19L, 2500 m, Asphalt; 08/26, 2500 m, Conc./Asph.	21,845,031
Stockholm	ESSB	BMA	**Stockholm–Bromma Airport**	Public	12/30, 1668 m, Asphalt	1,190,507
Stockholm	ESSE		Skå-Edeby Airport	Public	03/21, 650 m, Grass; 11/29, 800 m, Grass	
Storuman	ESUD	SQO	Storuman Airport	Public	15/33, 2283 m, Asph./Conc.	
Storvik	ESOL		Lemstanäs Airport	Public	06/24, 620 m, Asphalt	
Strängnäs	ESKS		Strängnäs Airbase (closed)	Military	2000 m, Paved	
Strömstad	ESGS		Näsinge Airport	Public	03/21, 906 m, Grass	
Sundbro	ESKC		Sundbro Airport	Public	03/21, 630 m, Grass; 08/26, 470 m, Grass; 14/32, 435 m, Grass	
Sundsvall / Härnösand	ESNN	SDL	**Sundsvall–Timrå Airport**	Public	16/34, 1950 m, Asphalt	62,251
Sunne	ESKU		Sunne Airport	Public	01/19, 770 m, Grass	
Sveg	ESND	EVG	**Sveg Airport**	Public	09/27, 1700 m, Asphalt	6,579
Säffle	ESGY		Säffle Airport	Private	01/19, 870 m, Grass	
Sälen / Trysil	ESKS	SCR	**Scandinavian Mountains Airport** (Sälen Trysil Airport)	Public	15/33, 2500 m, Asphalt	19,064
Såtenäs	ESIB		Såtenäs Airbase	Military	01/19, 2264 m, Asphalt; 11/29, 1933 m, Asphalt	
Söderhamn	ESNY	SOO	Söderhamn Airport	Public	12/30, 2524 m, Asphalt	
Sövdeborg	ESMI		Sövdeborg Airport	Public	12/30, 800 m, Grass	
Tidaholm	ESGD		Bämmelshed Airport	Public	04/2, 675 m, Grass	
Tierp	ESKT		Tierp Airport	Public	16/34, 1000 m, Asphalt	
Tingsryd	ESMW		Tingsryd Airport (closed)	Public	610 m, Unpaved	
Tomelilla	ESTO		Tomelilla Airport	Public	09/27, 840 m, Grass	
Torsby	ESST	TYF	**Torsby Airport** (Fryklanda Airport)	Public	16/34, 1591 m, Asphalt	2,152
Trelleborg	ESMR		Trelleborg Airport (Maglarp Airport)	Public	12/30, 600 m, Unpaved	
Trollhättan / Vänersborg	ESGT	THN	**Trollhättan–Vänersborg Airport**	Public	15/33, 1710 m, Asphalt	16,085
Uddevalla	ESGA		Backamo Airport	Public	06/24, 760 m, Grass	
Uddevalla	ESGU		Rörkärr Airport	Public	03/21, 655 m, Grass	
Umeå	ESNU	UME	**Umeå Airport**	Public	14/32, 2302 m, Asphalt	685,885
Uppsala	ESCM		Uppsala Airport / Ärna Airbase (F 16)	Public/Mil.	03/21, 1905 m, Asphalt; 08/26, 2010 m, Asphalt	
Varberg	ESGV		Varberg Airport	Public	06/24, 600 m, Grass; 12/30, 600 m, Grass	
Vellinge	ESTT		Vellinge Airport	Public	03/21, 800 m, Grass	
Vidsel	ESPE		Vidsel Airbase	Military	11/29, 2230 m, Asphalt	
Vilhelmina	ESNV	VHM	**Vilhelmina Airport**	Public	10/28, 1502 m, Asphalt	11,618
Visby	ESSV	VBY	**Visby Airport**	Public	03/21, 2000 m, Asphalt; 10/28, 1100 m, Grass	318,064
Visingsö	ESSI		Visingsö Airport	Public	01/19, 600 m, Grass; 15/33, 800 m, Grass	
Vårgårda	ESGO		Vårgårda Airport	Private	04/22, 700 m, Asphalt	
Vängsö	ESSZ		Vängsö Airport	Public	03/21, 630 m, Grass; 15/33, 620 m, Grass	
Västervik	ESSW	VVK	Västervik Airport	Public	15L/33R, 800 m, Asphalt; 15R/33L, 800 m, Grass	
Västerås	ESSX		Johannisberg Airport	Public	05/23, 850 m, Asphalt	
Växjö	ESFU		Uråsa Airbase (closed)	Military	2300 m, Paved	
Växjö	ESMX	VXO	**Växjö/Kronoberg Airport**	Public	01/19, 2103 m, Asphalt	167,363
Älmhult	ESMU		Möckeln Airport	Public	03/21, 604 m, Grass	
Älvsbyn	ESUV		Älvsbyn Airport	Public	04/22, 730 m, Grass	
Ängelholm / Helsingborg	ESTA	AGH	**Ängelholm–Helsingborg Airport**	Public	14/32, 1945 m, Asphalt	223,653
Ålleberg	ESGC		Ålleberg Airport	Public	03/21, 550 m, Grass	
Åmsele	ESUA		Åmsele Airbase (closed)	Military	2041 m, Paved	
Ånge	ESUJ		Tälje Airport	Public	14/32, 720 m, Grass	
Åsele	ESUS		Åsele Airport	Public	12/30, 1200 m, Grass	
Ölanda	ESMZ		Ölanda Airport	Public	15/33, 600 m, Asphalt	
Örebro	ESOE	ORB	**Örebro Airport**	Public	01/19, 3270 m, Asphalt	80,694
Öresten	ESGM		Öresten Airport	Public	06/24, 680 m, Grass	
Örnsköldsvik	ESNO	OER	**Örnsköldsvik Airport**	Public	12/30, 2014 m, Asphalt	28,003
Östersund	ESNZ	OSD	**Åre Östersund Airport** (F4 Frösön Airbase)	Public	12/30, 2500 m, Asphalt	253,468
Överkalix	ESNE		Överkalix Airport	Public	05/23, 900 m, Grass	

== Heliports ==
Only heliports with ICAO code are listed.

City served	ICAO	IATA	Airport name	Usage
Berga	ESQP		Berga Naval Base	
Boden	ESPG		Boden Garrison	
Bollnäs	ESJB		Bollnäs hospital	
Gällivare/Malmberget	ESEG		Ivare/Vassara	
Gothenburg	ESHB		Östra Sjukhuset	
Gothenburg	ESHS		Sahlgrenska Hospital	
Helsingborg	ESHH		Hamnen	
Hudiksvall	ESHX		hospital	
Jönköping	ESHJ		Ryhov Hospital	
Kiruna	ESEK		Luossajärvi	
Kristianstad	ESHI		hospital	
Linköping	ESEL		hospital	
Lund	ESEM		hospital	
Luleå	ESES		Sunderby Hospital	
Lycksele	ESEY		hospital	
Malmö	ESHM	JMM	Malmö Harbour Heliport	Defunct
Norrtälje	ESHY		hospital	
Örebro	ESHQ		hospital	
Skövde	ESHO		hospital	
Stockholm	ESHD		Danderyd Hospital	
Stockholm	ESHG		Stockholm Gamla Stan Heliport	
Stockholm	ESHT		Stockholm–Gärdet heliport	
Stockholm	ESHL		Huddinge Hospital	
Stockholm	ESHK		Karolinska Hospital	
Stockholm	ESHC		Södersjukhuset hospital	
outside Trelleborg	ESEX		Kriegers Flak A	
outside Trelleborg	ESEZ		Kriegers Flak B	

== Map ==
Airports with IATA codes in Sweden

== See also ==
- Transport in Sweden
- List of airports by ICAO code: EH-EY#ES – Sweden
- Wikipedia:WikiProject Aviation/Airline destination lists: Europe#Sweden
- List of the busiest airports in the Nordic countries
