= Stockholm Airport =

Stockholm Airport may refer to:

== Sweden ==
=== Active airports ===
- Stockholm Arlanda Airport (ARN/ESSA), the city's main international airport
- Stockholm Bromma Airport (BMA/ESSB)
- Stockholm Skavsta Airport (NYO/ESKN)
- Stockholm Västerås Airport (VST/ESOW)

=== Defunct airports ===
- Barkarby Airport (ESKB), closed in 2010

== Papua New Guinea ==
- Stockholm Airport (Papua New Guinea) (SMP)
