= ESSL (disambiguation) =

ESSL may refer to:

- European Severe Storms Laboratory, a non-profit organization dedicated to basic and applied research on severe convective storms
- The ICAO code of Linköping/Saab Airport in Sweden
- OpenGL ES Shading Language (GLSL ES), a set of versions of OpenGL Shading Language (GLSL) for use with OpenGL ES or WebGL
