= Flygbussarna =

Swedish bus service

Flygbussarna Vy Flygbussarna

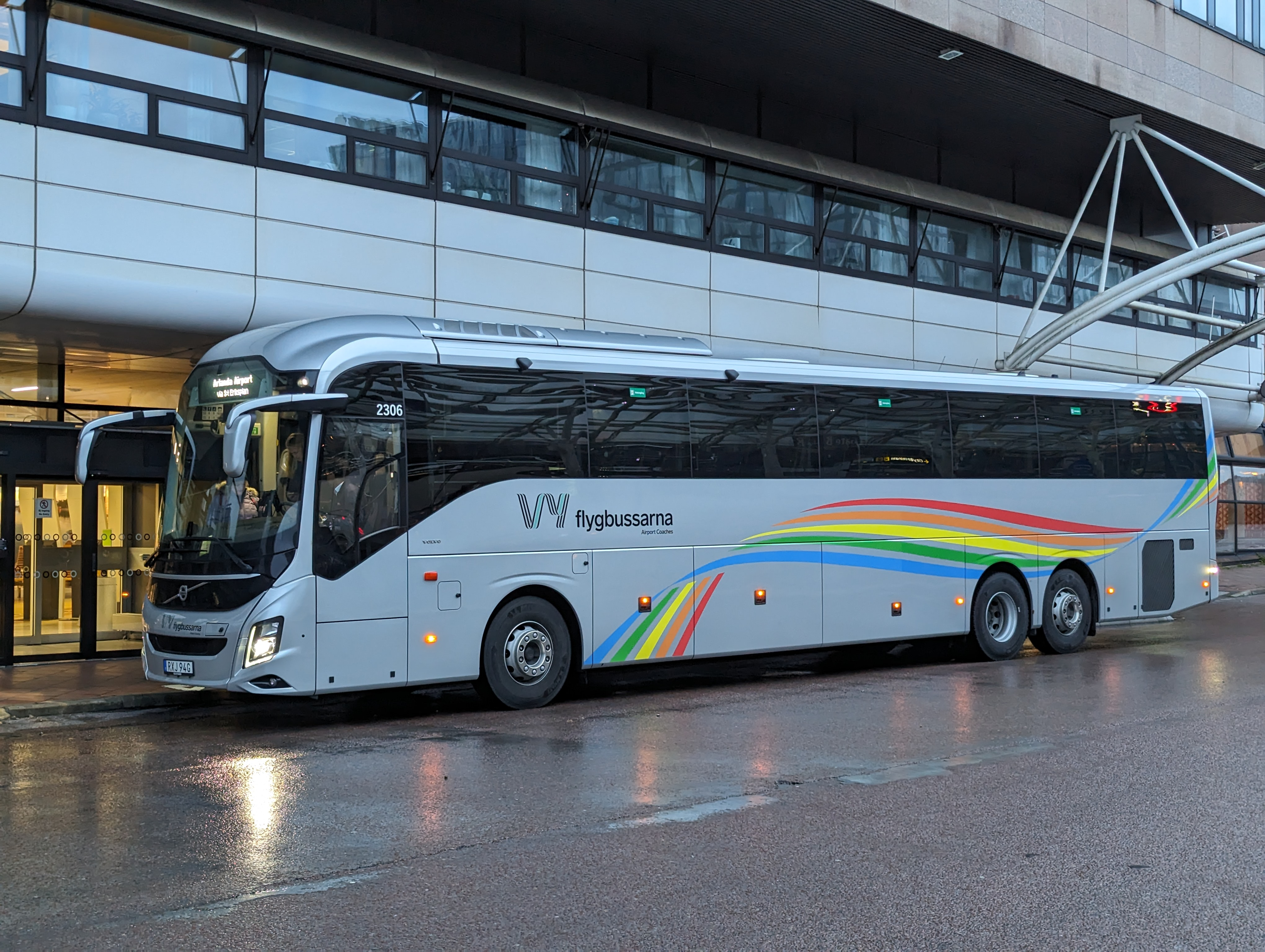
- Parent: Vy Buss (Vygruppen AS)
- Founded: 1989
- Headquarters: Cityterminalen, Stockholm
- Locale: Sweden
- Service area: Airports of Sweden
- Service type: Airport bus
- Fuel type: Rapeseed oil
- Operator: Vy Buss AB
- Website: www.flygbussarna.se

Flygbussarna (lit. 'The airport buses') is an airport bus service that connects six major airports with cities in Sweden. Founded in 1989 by SL, the service is currently owned by Vy Buss AB, a company wholly owned by the Government of Norway, and operates under the brand name Vy Flygbussarna.

== History ==
Storstockholms Lokaltrafik (SL) began operating airport coaches under the name Flygbussarna in Stockholm in 1989. The service was incorporated in 1990 as SL Flygbussarna AB. In 2000, SL sold a majority stake in the company to its management, Atle, and Nordico Invest. The company was renamed FAC Flygbussarna Airport Coaches AB.

In 2005, SL sold its remaining 30% stake in the company to People Travel Group. In 2007, Veolia Transport acquired People Travel Group, including Flygbussarna.

In 2009, Acne, a Swedish advertising company, constructed a coach bus using 50 wrecked cars to promote Flygbussarna. The bus resembled a real Flygbussarna coach and aimed to encourage drivers to use public transportation instead of private cars to reduce CO_{2} emissions.

Between November 2016 and September 2018, Flygbussarna offered a ride-sharing service called "Flygbussarna Door to Gate." Passengers could book shared minibus transportation to or from Arlanda Airport, departing or arriving at any location in the Stockholm area. The service was discontinued due to low demand.

In December 2019, Transdev sold Flygbussarna to the Norwegian company Vy. The acquisition was completed in March 2020.

On December 24, 2024, Vy Flygbussarna ceased its line between Cityterminalen in Stockholm and Stockholm Bromma Airport. This decision followed the announcement that BRA, the primary airline operating at Bromma, would cease its operations there. Flygbussarna had served Bromma Airport since 1992.

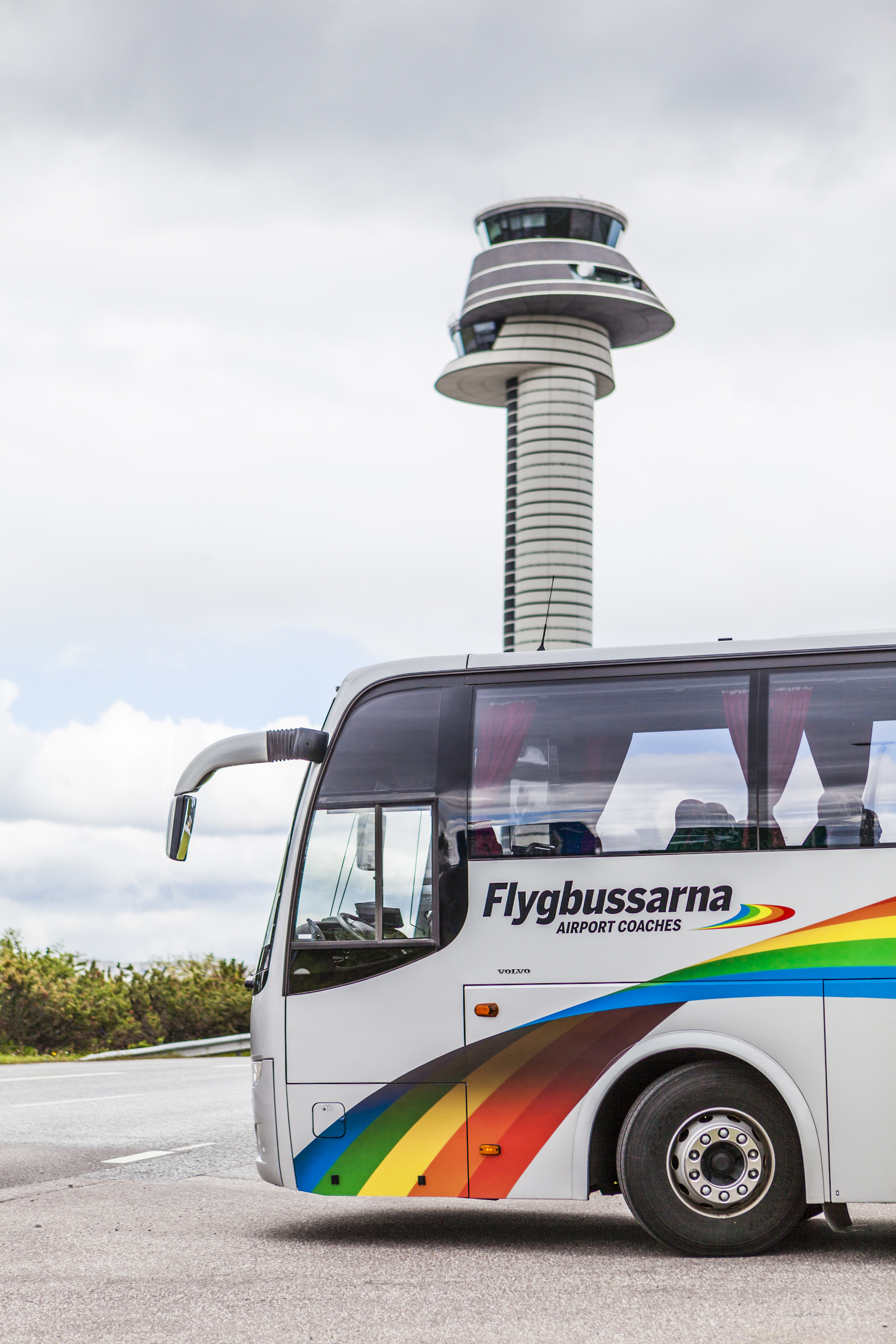
Flygbuss by the control tower of Stockholm Arlanda Airport.

== Airports and cities served ==
As of 2025, flygbussarna operates routes to six airports in Sweden:

Stockholm Arlanda Airport

- Stockholm Arlanda Airport – Stockholm (Cityterminalen)
- Stockholm Arlanda Airport – Liljeholmen
- Stockholm Arlanda Airport – Brommaplan

Stockholm Skavsta Airport

- Stockholm Skavsta Airport – Stockholm (Cityterminalen)
- Stockholm Skavsta Airport – Linköping – Norrköping

Stockholm Västerås Airport

- Stockholm Västerås Airport – Stockholm (Cityterminalen)

Göteborg Landvetter Airport

- Göteborg Landvetter Airport – Gothenburg (Nils Ericson Terminal)
- Göteborg Landvetter Airport – Lindholmen

Malmö Airport

- Malmö Airport – Malmö

Visby Airport

- Visby Airport – Visby (seasonal)
