= Karlskoga Airport =

Regional airport in Karlskoga, Sweden

Karlskoga Airport Karlskoga flygplats
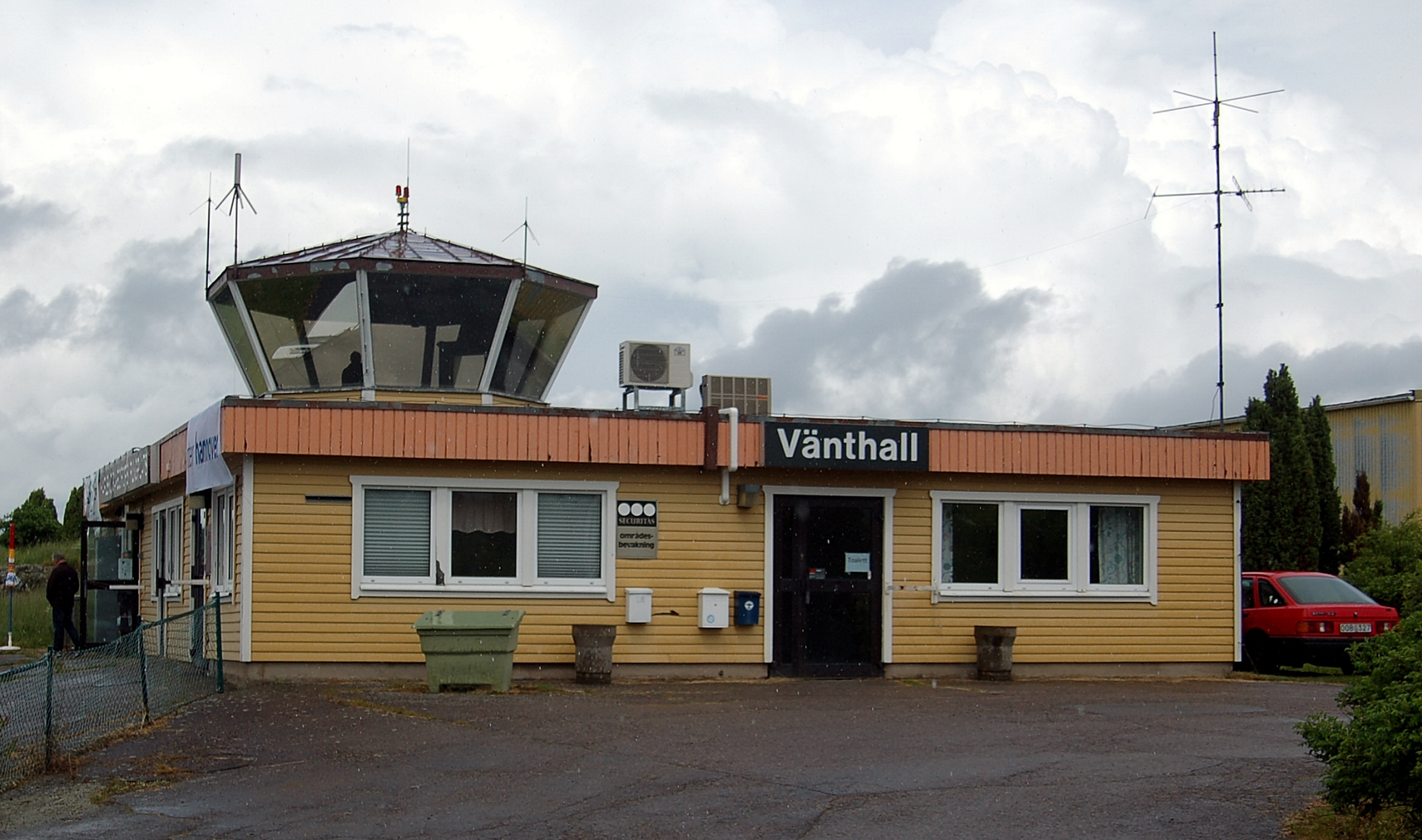
- IATA: KSK; ICAO: ESKK

Summary
- Serves: Karlskoga
- Time zone: UTC+01:00 (CET)
  - Summer (DST): UTC+02:00 ()
- Elevation AMSL: 122 m / 400 ft
- Coordinates: 59.3°N 14.5°E
- Website: karlskoga-airport.se

Map

Runways
| Direction | Length | | Surface |
| Direction | m | ft | Surface |
|---|---|---|---|
| | 1,500 | 4,921 | Asphalt |

Karlskoga Airport (IATA: KSK, ICAO: ESKK), is an airport in the municipality of Karlskoga, Örebro, Sweden. Located 3 km (1.8 mi) northwest of Karlskoga.

== History ==
It served as a regional airport and operated flights to Stockholm Arlanda Airport until 1991, in the 1980s to Bromma Airport, Oslo, and Copenhagen. The airport stopped civilian passenger air traffic flights when arms manufacturer Bofors changed its flights to Örebro Airport. The airport hosts several events, such as air shows open to the public.

== Statistics ==
| Year | Passenger volume | Change | Domestic | Change | International | Change |
|---|---|---|---|---|---|---|
| 1984 | 20,150 | | | | | |
| 1985 | 21,400 | ▲1,250 | | | | |

== See also ==
- List of airports in Sweden
