= MXX =

MXX or mxx may refer to:

- 1020 in Roman numerals
- MXX, the IATA code for Mora–Siljan Airport, Sweden
- mxx, the ISO 639-3 code for Mahou language
