= Mellingeholm Airport =

Private airport on public land, south of Norttälje, Sweden

Mellingeholm Airport Mellingeholms flygplats
- IATA: none; ICAO: ESSN

Summary
- Airport type: Public
- Operator: Mellingeholm Flygplats AB
- Serves: Stockholms Län
- Location: Norrtälje, Sweden
- Elevation AMSL: 12 ft / 4 m
- Coordinates: 59°44′01″N 18°41′54″E
- Website: rfk.nu

Map
- Location within Stockholm County

Runways
Direction	Length		Surface
Direction	m	ft	Surface
07/25	1,400	4,593	Asphalt, grass

Mellingeholm Airport, also known as Norrtälje Airport, is an airport owned by Roslagens Flygklubb on county owned land south of Norrtälje, Sweden.

== Background ==
The airport is, since the closure of Barkarby Airport, the only minor airport in Stockholm County with an asphalted runway (besides the major airports of Bromma and Arlanda). In 2009, the municipal government of Stockholm County started looking after new alternatives for general aviation in Stockholm County. The municipal government sought after having a northern and southern alternative, where Mellingeholm was appointed as the northern one.

Sjöfartsverket (maritime department) uses Mellingeholm airport as a base for one of their seven SAR helicopters. Mellingeholm is since 2017 also a base for the Stockholm ambulance helicopter services. The airstrip is also home to a flight club and two flight schools. Around 15 aircraft are based at the airport, as well as Roslagens Helikopterflyg and the helicopter flight school Proflight Nordic.

== See also ==
- List of airports in Sweden
