= Möckeln Airport =

Airport in Sweden

Möckeln Airfield Möckelns Flygfält
- IATA: none; ICAO: ESMU

Summary
- Owner: Älmhults Flygklubb
- Operator: Älmhults Flygklubb
- Coordinates: 56°34′23″N 014°10′6″E
- Website: www.esmu.se
- Interactive map of Möckeln Airfield

Runways
Direction	Length		Surface
Direction	ft	m	Surface
03/21	1,970	600	Grass

Möckeln Airport (ICAO: ESMU), also known as Möckelns Flygfält (Swedish: Möckelns Flygfält), is an airport in Älmhult Municipality, Sweden, run by the Älmhults flygklubb (Swedish: Älmhults flyugklubb). The club has about 25 members and owns a SOCATA Rallye and Zenair CH 300. The airport is located in the north-eastern part of Älmhult. The club has more than 20 RC airplanes that have an ability to fly.

== See also ==
- List of airports in Sweden
