= Jonair =

Swedish airline

IATA	ICAO	Call sign
—	JON	JONAIR
- Founded: 1972; 53 years ago
- Hubs: Umeå Airport
- Fleet size: 7
- Headquarters: Umeå, Sweden
- Website: jonair.se

Jonair is a Swedish regional airline headquartered in Umeå and based at Umeå Airport.

== History ==
Jonair was founded in 1972. The company has operated the Luleå-Pajala route since March 2015 and the Umeå-Östersund and Sveg-Arlanda routes since October 2019. In addition, the company also operates air taxis and scenic helicopter flights in cooperation with Kallax flyg.

== Destinations ==
As of May 2023, Jonair serves the following destinations:

Country	City	Airport	Notes	Refs
Sweden	Hagfors	Hagfors Airport		
Sweden	Luleå	Luleå Airport		
Sweden	Mora	Mora Airport		
Sweden	Östersund	Åre Östersund Airport		
Sweden	Pajala	Pajala Airport		
Sweden	Stockholm	Stockholm Arlanda Airport		
Sweden	Sveg	Sveg Airport		
Sweden	Torsby	Torsby Airport		
Sweden	Umeå	Umeå Airport	Base	

== Fleet ==
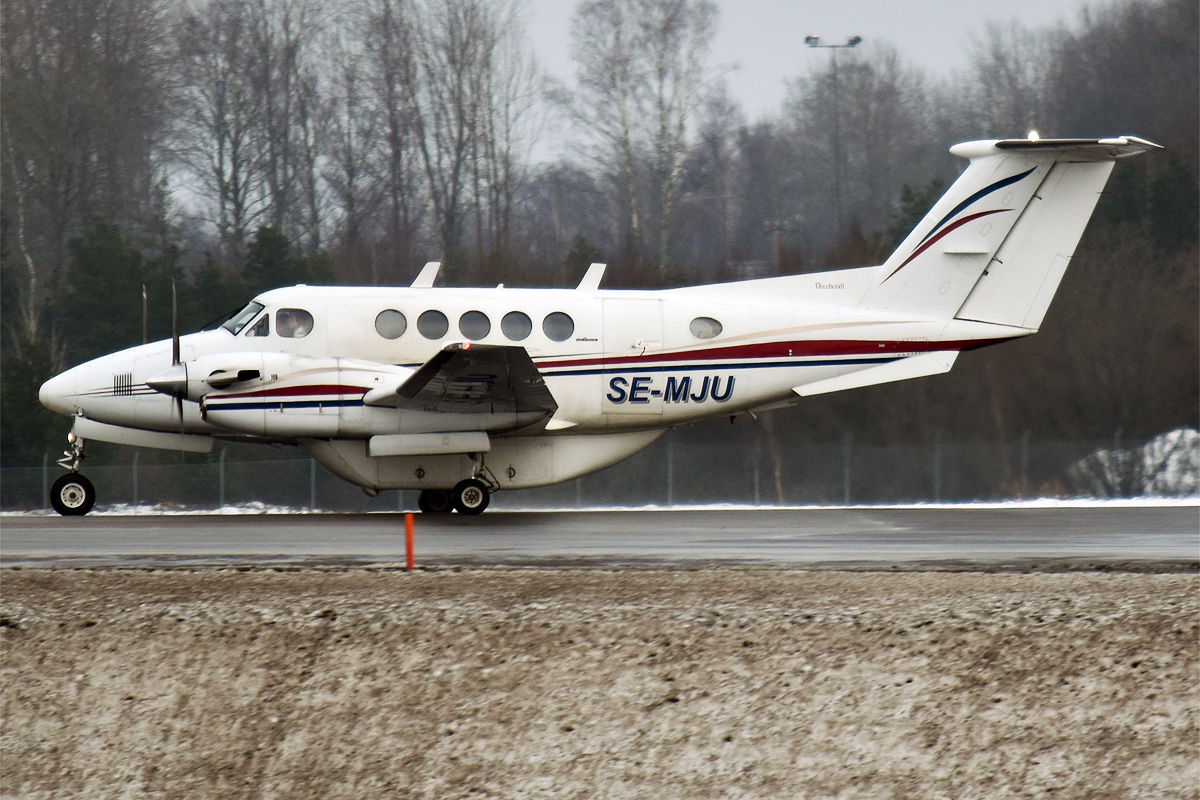
Jonair Beechcraft King Air 200

Aircraft fleet and routes
Aircraft type	Routes
Beechcraft King Air 200	Pajala-Luleå, Sveg-Arlanda, taxi flights
2 Beechcraft B1900C (as of August 2025)	Umeå-Östersund
Piper PA-31-310 Navajo	Taxi flights
Piper PA-31-350 Chieftain	Taxi flights
Eurocopter EC120B	Scenic flights
