= Hudiksvall Airport =

Former airport in Hudiksvall, Sweden

Hudiksvall Airport Hudiksvalls flygplats
- IATA: HUV; ICAO: ESNH

Summary
- Operator: Airlift Helicopter Sweden AB
- Serves: Hudiksvall
- Location: Hudiksvall, Sweden
- Elevation AMSL: 93 ft (28 m)
- Coordinates: 61°46′0″N 17°5′3″E

Map
- Location within Sweden Gävleborg Location within Sweden

Runways
| Direction | Length | | Surface |
| Direction | ft | m | Surface |
|---|---|---|---|
| 12/30 | 4,199 | 1,280 | Asphalt |

Hudiksvall Airport (IATA: HUV, ICAO: ESNH) is a former regional airport in Hudiksvall, Sweden. Scheduled flights have previously operated to Stockholm Arlanda Airport and Stockholm Bromma Airport.

== History ==
The route between Hudiksvall and Arlanda was operated from 1977 to 2001 by various airlines, including Air Hudik, Holmstroem Air, and Swedeways Airlines. In November 2001, the last aircraft servicing the route between Hudiksvall and Stockholm was sold, marking the end of commercial flight operations at Hudiksvall Airport. On November 7, 2013, the airport was auctioned off and purchased by Brinkab, a local construction company. The sale included the runway, hangars, workshop, warehouse, and office buildings. Brinkab planned to use the space for storing construction scaffolding.

== Facilities ==
The airport has one asphalt runway, designated 12/30, with a length of 1,280 meters (4,199 ft) and a width of 30 meters. It is located approximately 10 minutes by car from the city center. As of 2024, the airport is operated by Airlift Helicopter Sweden AB, suggesting it may be used for helicopter operations.

== See also ==
List of airports in Sweden
