= Idre Airport =

Idre Airport Idre flygplats

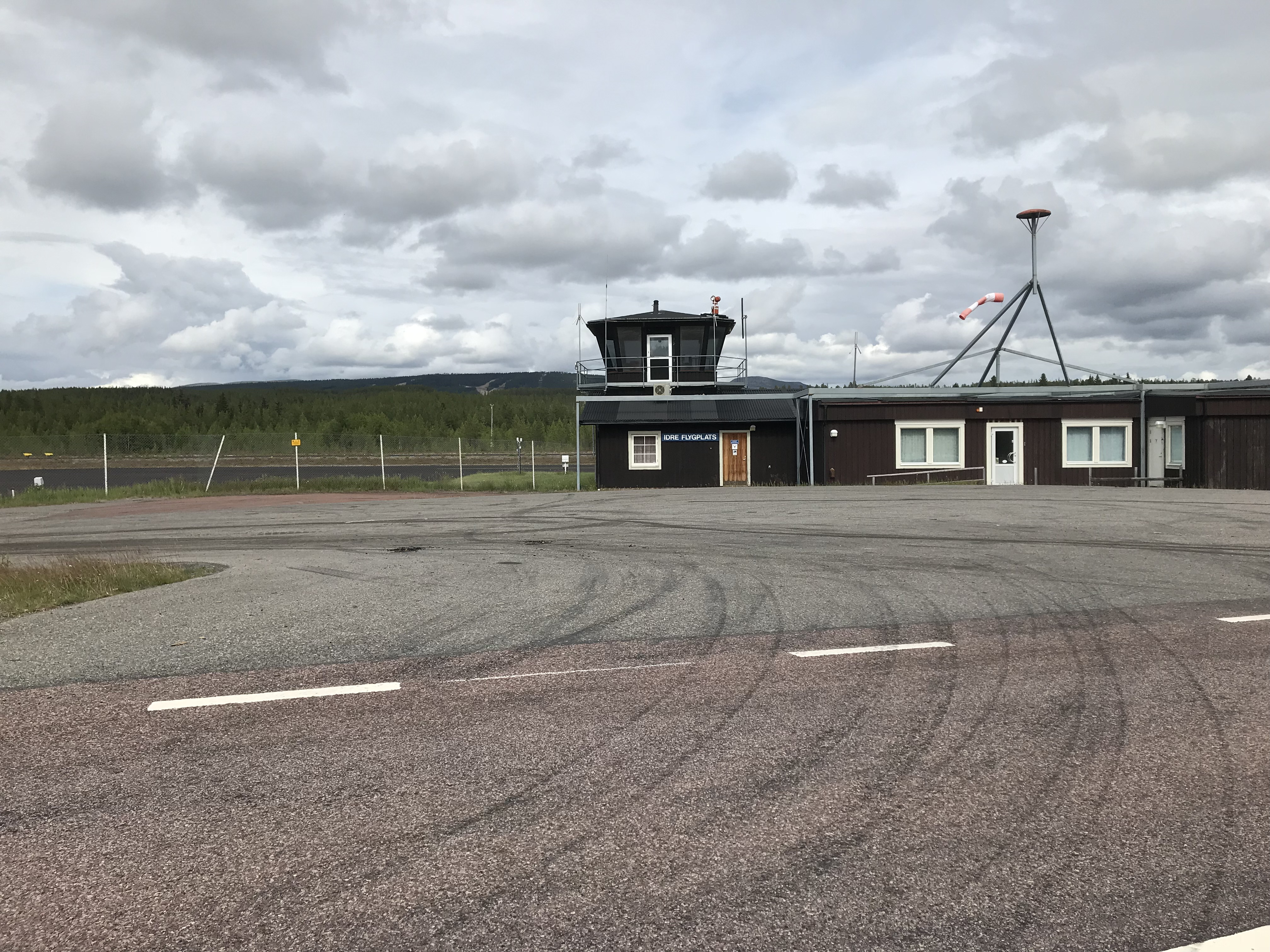
- IATA: IDB; ICAO: ESUE

Summary
- Airport type: Private
- Owner: IdreFjäll Foundation
- Location: Idre, Dalarna, Sweden
- Elevation AMSL: 1,480 ft / 451 m
- Coordinates: 61°52′11″N 12°41′21″E
- Website: https://www.idrefjallensairport.se/

Map

Runways
Direction	Length		Surface
Direction	ft	m	Surface
15/33	5,112	1,558	Asphalt

Idre Airport (IATA: IDB, ICAO: ESUE) is a minor airport located in Idre, Dalarna, Sweden. It was originally established as a regional airport but has since transitioned to primarily serve private aviation.

== History ==
The airport's runway was constructed as a gravel field in the early 1960s. It was officially inaugurated in 1994 after being developed to accommodate scheduled flights. Regular service to Stockholm Arlanda Airport operated from January 1994 until August 1999. Following its initial years of operation, Älvdalen Municipality placed the airport up for sale in 1999. From 2000 to 2017, the airport experienced significant neglect in maintenance. Jonny Granlund, the former CEO of Idre Flygplats AB, owned the airport during this period and kept it on the market for fifteen years without a sale.

== Recent developments ==
In January 2015, after years of being for sale, Idre Airport was sold to a new owner. The IdreFjäll Foundation subsequently acquired the airport. Renovations began in 2018 and were completed by 2019, which included repaving the runway. The airport is now primarily used for private aircraft and air taxi services. As of 2023, Idre Airport has incorporated additional facilities, including a bakery and café named Skorpgården, which serves both local residents and visitors. The airport has seen increased use by private pilots.

== See also ==
List of airports in Sweden
