= Pajala Airport =

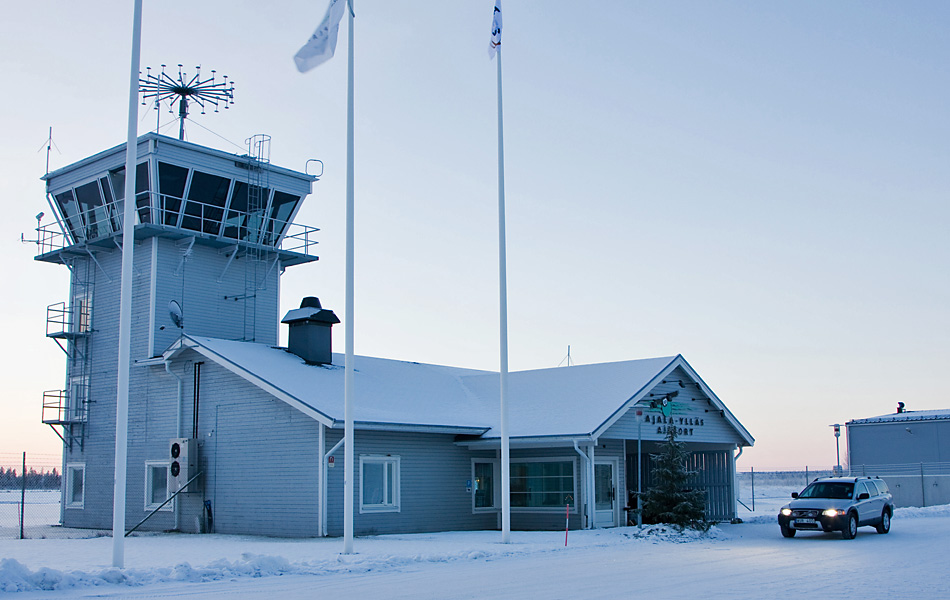
- IATA: PJA; ICAO: ESUP

Summary
- Airport type: Public
- Operator: Pajala Municipality
- Location: Pajala, Norrbotten, Sweden
- Elevation AMSL: 542 ft (165 m)
- Coordinates: 67°14′44″N 023°04′08″E
- Website: www.pajala.se/pajala-airport

Map
- Location within Norrbotten PJA (Sweden)

Runways
Direction	Length		Surface
Direction	m	ft	Surface
11/29	2,302	7,552	Asphalt

Statistics (2016)
- Passengers total: 5,914
- Domestic passengers: 2,007
- International passengers: 3,907

Pajala Airport (IATA: PJA, ICAO: ESUP) is an airport in Pajala, Sweden. While the English name is the official name, it may also be referred to in Swedish as Pajala flygplats.

== History ==
The airport was opened for regular traffic in 1999. Before that, Pajala was said to be the most inaccessible municipality centre in Sweden, with around 5 hours travel time from central Stockholm (with propeller flights to Gällivare Airport, hand luggage only, and a 140 km journey by car from Gällivare to Pajala). A political principle was established at the time stating that the maximum travel time between central Stockholm and any municipality centre should be four hours to make one-day business travel possible.

The runway was extended by 880 metres (2,890 ft) to 2,302 metres (7,552 ft) in 2007, to be able to handle larger charter aircraft. Beginning in December 2013, the airport has been used for several charter flights per year from Norwich, Birmingham and Humberside in the United Kingdom for tourists wishing to see a white Christmas.

In 2021 the terminal building was enlarged to allow more passengers and more luggage. The winter flights from UK has had passengers staying only for the day with hand luggage, but there is a desire to have 200-passenger flights with checked luggage for longer stays.

== Airlines and destinations ==
The following airlines operate regular scheduled and charter flights at Pajala Airport:

Airlines	Destinations
Jonair	Luleå

== Ground transportation ==
The airport is 15 kilometres (9 mi) west of Pajala village. Taxi and rental cars are available. The bus no 46 Gällivare–Pajala stops at the main road near the airport, however only twice per day.
