= Västervik Airport =

Västervik Airport Västerviks flygplats
- IATA: VVK; ICAO: ESSW

Summary
- Airport type: Public
- Owner: Västervik Municipality
- Serves: Västervik
- Location: Mommehål, Västervik Municipality, Sweden
- Elevation AMSL: 75 ft / 23 m
- Coordinates: 57°46′47″N 16°31′26″E
- Website: http://www.essw.se

Map

Runways
Direction	Length		Surface
Direction	ft	m	Surface
15/33	3,934	1,199	Asphalt

Västervik Airport (IATA: VVK, ICAO: ESSW) is a minor airport located approximately 7 km northwest of Västervik, Kalmar County, Sweden. It is owned by Västervik Municipality.

== Facilities ==
The airport has one asphalt runway (15/33) measuring 1,199 meters (3,934 ft) in length. It offers aviation fuel sales (JET A1 and 100LL) via a card-operated system. The runway is equipped with lighting and approach lights that can be activated from aircraft (PCL).

== History ==
=== Early operations ===
Scheduled air service operated at Västervik from 1971 to 1986, initially between Västervik to Stockholm-Bromma Airport and later between Västervik to Stockholm Arlanda Airport. The airline Syd-Aero flew the Stockholm-Västervik-Oskarshamn route. In 1980, the route served 3,476 passengers, increasing to 3,744 in 1985.

=== Runway extension project ===
In 2016, Västervik Municipality decided to invest 10 million SEK to extend the airport's runway. This decision was influenced by a lobbying campaign involving ABBA's Björn Ulvaeus and local business leaders. The runway was extended from 800 to 1,199 meters in 2017. However, as of 2022, the new section of the runway had not been approved by the Swedish Transport Agency due to issues with land ownership around the airport. The project has faced criticism due to its cost and failure to achieve its intended purpose of allowing larger aircraft, including air ambulances, to use the airport. On September 1, 2024, Urban Wahlberg became the new airport manager. Wahlberg has experience with the airport through conducting drone tests there and stated that the facility would continue to operate as an airport.
