= Stockholm Västerås Airport =

Stockholm Västerås Airport Stockholm Västerås flygplats

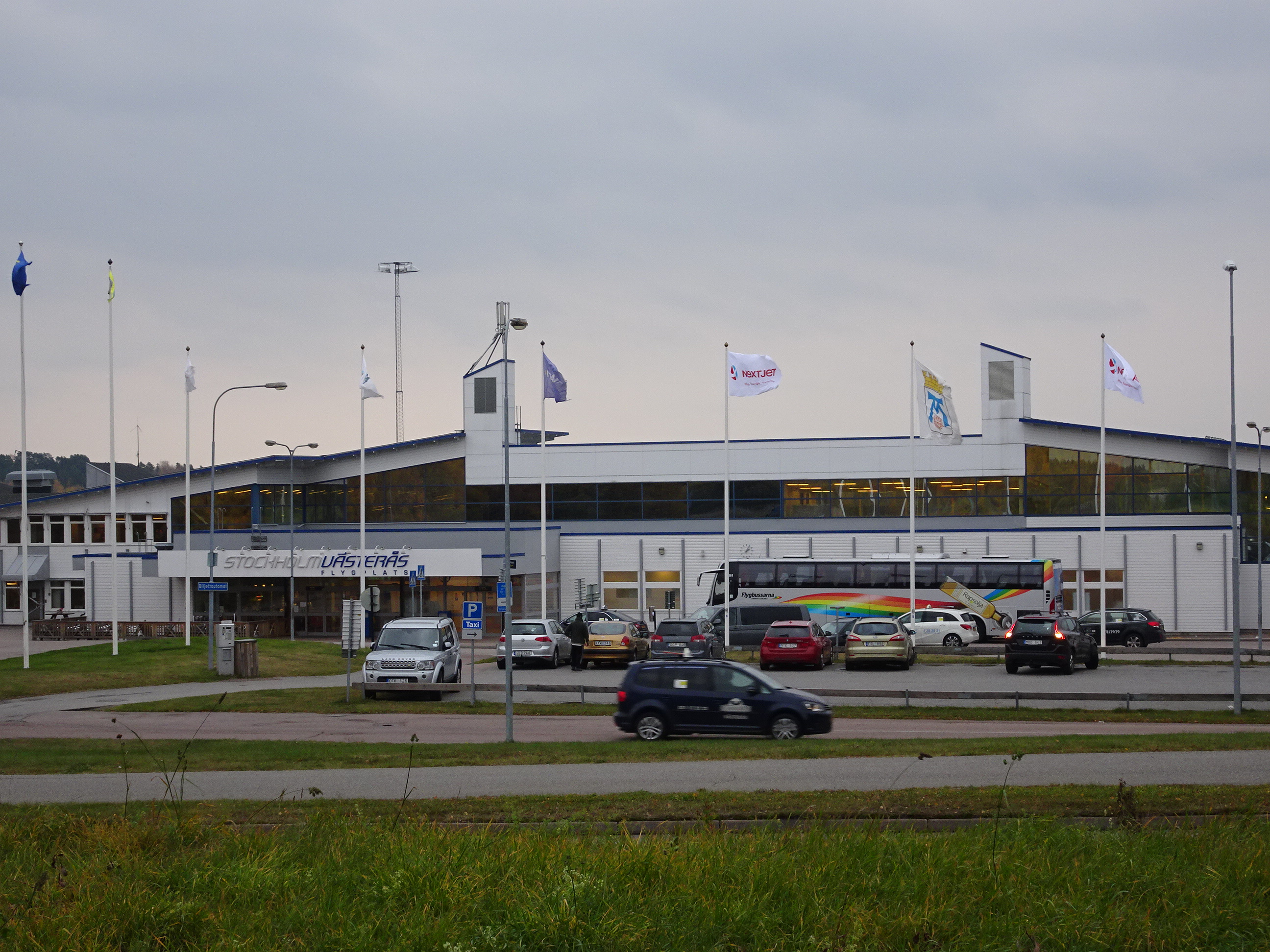
- IATA: VST; ICAO: ESOW

Summary
- Airport type: Public
- Owner: Västerås Municipality (100%)
- Operator: Nya Västerås Flygplats AB: Västerås Municipality (50%); Region Västmanland (50%)
- Serves: Stockholm, Sweden
- Location: Västerås
- Elevation AMSL: 6 m (20 ft)
- Coordinates: 59°35′22″N 016°38′01″E

Map
- Location of airport in Västmanland VST (Sweden)

Runways
Direction	Length		Surface
Direction	m	ft	Surface
01/19	2,581	8,468	Asphalt
01/19	800	2,625	Grass

Statistics (2019)
- Passengers total: 109,133
- Aircraft movements: 14,250
- Statistics: Swedish Transport Agency

Stockholm Västerås Airport (IATA: VST, ICAO: ESOW), also known as Hässlö Flygplats, is a minor international airport located near the city of Västerås, Sweden. The airport is located 110 km (70 mi) west of Stockholm, and is outside of Stockholm County, but is included in STO, the IATA airport code for Stockholm airports. The airport handled a total of 87,925 passengers in 2025, making it Sweden's 16th-busiest airport.

== History ==
=== Military base (1930s-1970s) ===
Västerås Airport was originally established as a military airbase in 1931 to serve the Swedish Air Force's 1st Flying Corps, which later became Västmanland Wing, F1 Hässlö. Civilian flights from the airport began in 1976, with Scandinavian Airlines (SAS) operating the first route to Copenhagen.

=== Transition to civil aviation (1980s - 1990s) ===
Military operations continued until the base's closure in 1983. The airbase was then taken over in November 1985 by Västerås Municipality, whose intention was to develop it into an aviation training centre.

In April 1999, the Swedish Civil Aviation Administration (Luftfartsverket) expressed interest in acquiring a stake in the airport, due to increasing congestion at Stockholm Arlanda Airport. The following year Luftfartsverket purchased a 40% stake in the airport, with plans to develop passenger traffic. The objective was to increase annual passenger numbers from 120,000 to approximately 500,000 within five years.

=== Low cost era (2000s -2010s) ===
In 2001 the airport changed its name from "Västerås Airport" to "Stockholm Västerås Airport" allowing it to be included in Stockholm's STO IATA code, and to increase its appeal for international flights. This followed the example set by Stockholm Skavsta Airport in 1991.

That same year, low-cost airline Ryanair commenced operations at Västerås Airport, initially offering flights to London Stansted Airport. It was later revealed that the airport had offered Ryanair discounts totaling 3.5 million SEK, in breach of municipal law. These included 50% reduced passenger fees and 67% reduced landing fees compared to those charged to SAS.

By 2003, Västerås Airport was struggling financially, having reported a loss of 15 million kronor in 2002, a drop in equity from 30 million to 14 million kronor, and total debts of 111 million kronor. The municipality approved multiple rescue packages for the airport, including one of 57 million kronor in 2006. That same year, Luftfartsverket sold its 40% share back to Västerås Municipality for a nominal price of 1 kr.

In response to a proposed aviation tax, Ryanair announced an end to its operations at Västerås Airport on 11th July 2006. After the September 2006 election, the new government abolished the proposed aviation tax. Ryanair returned to Västerås Airport in 2007, launching new routes to London Stansted and Dublin.

TNT operated freight flights between Liege and Västerås Airport between 2008 and 2015, when the service was relocated back to Örebro.

In 2009, Ryanair launched two new routes from Stockholm Västerås to Barcelona (Girona) and Weeze. The route to Weeze was discontinued after a few months due to poor profitability.

In April 2010, Ryanair started another route from the airport to Alicante. In 2011, the airline expanded its summer schedule to include Malaga as a new destination and discontinued the Barcelona route. During the summer of 2012 and 2013, the destinations included Girona, Palma de Mallorca, Alicante, Malaga, London, and Antalya.

In the summer of 2012, the airline Flyglinjen operated flights between Västerås and Visby. This route was terminated in 2013 .

On 31 October and 1 November 2013, Ryanair began two new winter routes to Gran Canaria and Tenerife (South). However, the Gran Canaria route was prematurely terminated on 9 January 2014. On 14 December 2013, Ryanair announced that the route to Barcelona-Girona would not be operated during the summer of 2014, and the Palma de Mallorca route was also at risk of being discontinued. This was confirmed on 8 January 2014, when Ryanair published its summer schedule for 2014, which included only the destinations Alicante and Malaga.

The airport played an important role during the 2014 Västmanland wildfire, serving as a base for water bombers and rescue helicopters.

Between May and October 2016, the Icelandic airline Wow operated regular flights between Västerås Airport and Keflavík International Airport in Iceland. By December 2019, the only flights operating from Västerås were Ryanair flights to London Stansted.

=== COVID-19 pandemic, closure threat, and resumed operations (2020-) ===
The COVID-19 pandemic severely affected Stockholm Västerås Airport, leading to a significant decline in passenger traffic. In response to the crisis, airport operations were repurposed to manufacture protective equipment, the airport became a distribution centre for medical supplies. This shift in activity allowed airport staff to remain in employment.

On 13 May 2020, the Västerås Municipality announced its decision to close down the airport, citing recurring annual losses and the need for ongoing financial support from the city, which were worsened by the coronavirus outbreak. By this point, the airport had cost taxpayers approximately SEK 588 million in the previous 15 years. The council stated that all airport activities should cease by 31 December 2022 at the latest.

The closure was not ultimately implemented following a local referendum held in Västerås on 21 March 2021. Voters were asked whether Västerås Municipality should discontinue the operations of the airport company. A total of 45,108 valid votes were cast, with 9,832 votes in favour of closure and 35,276 votes against, resulting in the continuation of operations at the airport. Ryanair resumed flights from Västerås Airport to Malaga on 2 May 2021, and to London Stansted and Alicante on 3 May 2021.

In 2023, concerns were raised about a Russian Orthodox Church built near Västerås Airport, due to its potential security implications. SVT reported that the church was largely financed by the Russian state-owned nuclear company Rosatom, which is owned by the Russian government. Swedish security agencies, including the Swedish Security Service (Säpo), identified connections between church representatives and Russian intelligence, suggesting the church could serve as a cover for espionage activities.

== Other Operations ==
=== Official contingency airport ===
In December 2022 the Swedish government announced that Stockholm Västerås Airport would be designated as the official contingency airport (Beredskapsflygplats) for Västmanland County. The government noted that during the pandemic, Västerås Airport has effectively served as a contingency airport, despite not being classified as one. This new status means the airport is available for essential air transport services 24/7, including for healthcare, rescue services, firefighting aircraft, and total defence needs.

=== General aviation ===
The airport has extensive general-aviation traffic. Of the 17,737 landings in 2014, 94% constituted general aviation, according to the Swedish CAA (Transportstyrelsen). This includes hospital flights, flight training, private flights, corporate flights and air taxi. A multitude of operators are based at the airport; among these are maintenance workshops, helicopter businesses, flight schools, flight clubs and an aviation museum.

== Airlines and destinations ==
The following airlines operate regular scheduled and charter flights at Stockholm Västerås Airport:

Airlines	Destinations
Ryanair	London–Stansted; Seasonal: Alicante

== Statistics ==
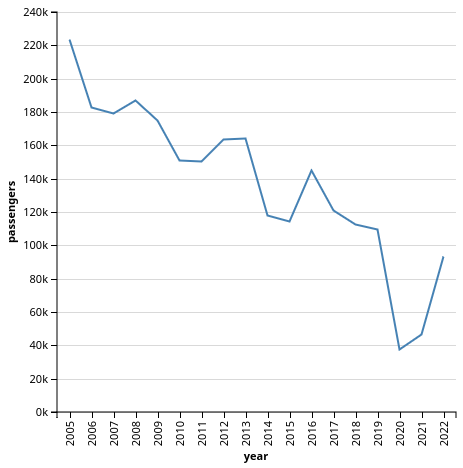
Line chart of Västerås Airport passengers per year

== Access ==
Travel from the airport to Stockholm Central Station may be done via Flygbussarna, private bus coach service, and takes approximately one and a half hours. There is also a local city bus to the Västerås Central Station, which has trains to Stockholm and more cities.

== See also ==
- Västmanland Wing (former Swedish Air Force wing)
- List of the largest airports in the Nordic countries
