= Härjedalen Sveg Airport =

Härjedalen Airport

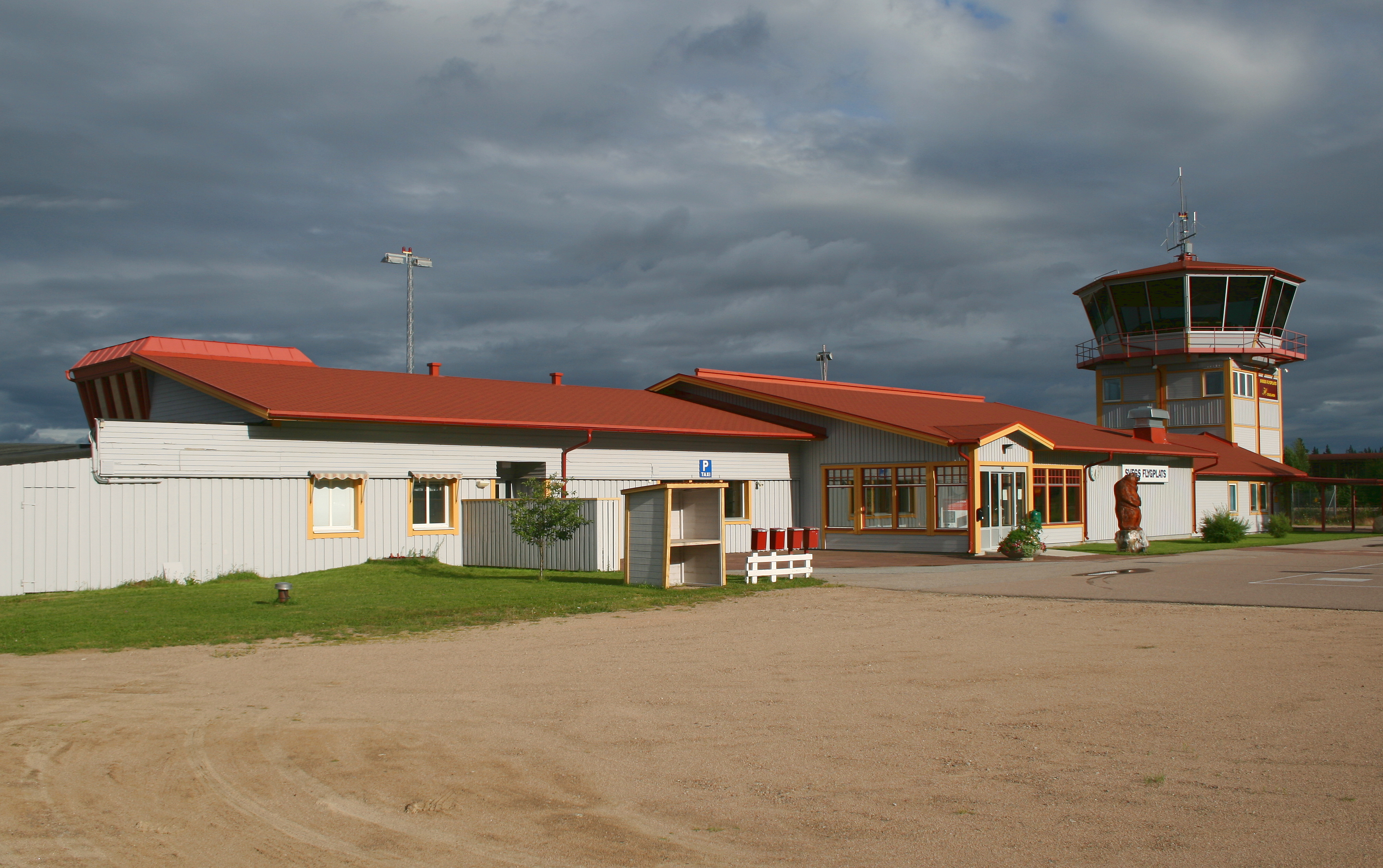
- IATA: EVG; ICAO: ESND

Summary
- Airport type: Public
- Operator: Härjedalen Municipality
- Location: Sveg
- Elevation AMSL: 1,178 ft (359 m)
- Coordinates: 62°2′52″N 014°25′22″E

Map
- Location within Jämtland Location within Sweden

Runways
| Direction | Length | | Surface |
| Direction | ft | m | Surface |
|---|---|---|---|
| 09/27 | 5,579 | 1,700 | Asphalt |

Statistics (2018)
- Passengers total: 6,444
- International passengers: 5
- Domestic passengers: 6,439
- Landings total: 1,112

Härjedalen Airport (IATA: EVG, ICAO: ESND), also known as Härjedalen Sveg Airport, is an airport in Sveg, Sweden

== Airlines and destinations ==
The following airlines operate regular scheduled and charter flights at Sveg Airport:

| Airlines | Destinations |
|---|---|
| Jonair | Mora, Stockholm–Arlanda |

== Statistics ==
There was an error rendering the chart.

== See also ==
- List of the largest airports in the Nordic countries
