= Mora–Siljan Airport =

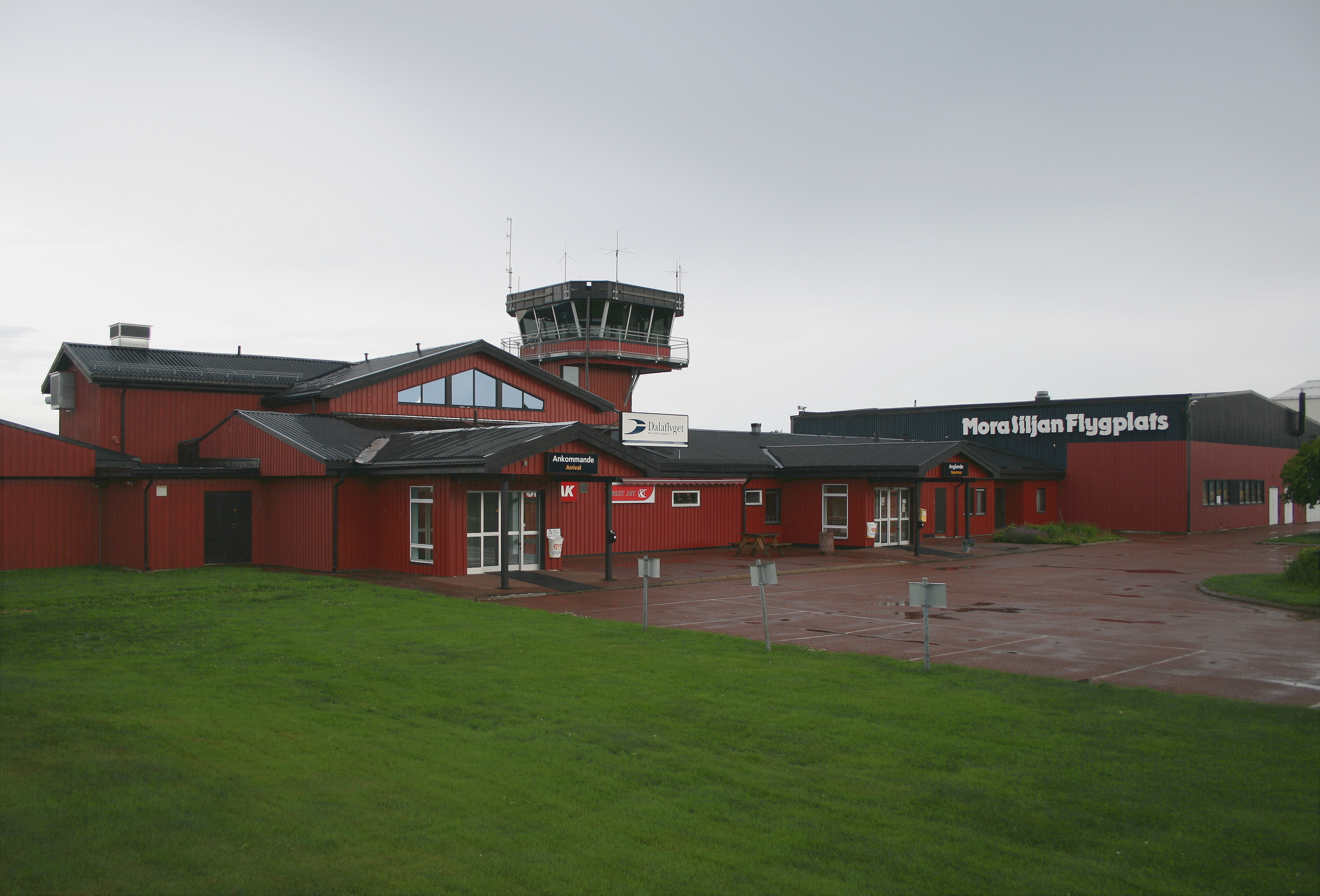
- IATA: MXX; ICAO: ESKM

Summary
- Airport type: Public
- Operator: AB Dalaflyget
- Location: Mora
- Elevation AMSL: 634 ft / 193 m
- Coordinates: 60°57′31″N 14°30′40″E

Map
- Location of airport in Sweden

Runways
Direction	Length		Surface
Direction	ft	m	Surface
16/34	5,938	1,810	Asphalt

Statistics (2016 / 2018)
- Passengers total: 7,434 / 4,640
- Domestic passengers: 7,302 / 4,484
- International passengers: 132 / 156
- Landings total: ? / 614

Mora–Siljan Airport (IATA: MXX, ICAO: ESKM) also known as Mora Airport is located about 7 km or 3.3 NM southwest of Mora, Sweden. Its fixed-base operator (FBO), AB Dalaflyget, which also operates Dala Airport, consists of the municipalities of Mora, Falun, Borlänge and Dalarna County, in Central Sweden. Dalaflyget also provides air traffic control services. The 45 m wide runway and parking can accommodate Boeing 737-type airliners.

== History ==
The number of passengers fell dramatically from about 50,000 passengers per year in the 1980s to 7,000 in 2010s, following a trend experienced during this period by all Swedish third-level airports. Competition between two domestic airlines, Skyways Express and the defunct European Executive Express, came to an end in 2005, leaving the area without flights to Stockholm and the outside world, requiring a 4-hour drive or train travel. Mora Municipality managed the airport before Dalaflyget was established. From 2016 until 2018 AIS Airlines operated the line to Stockholm.

On 28 February 2018, the route to Stockholm Arlanda was canceled, since the Swedish Transport Administration, which procured the Arlanda–Sveg route, did not accept the line being combined with the Arlanda–Mora route. This has been processed in court and also appealed to the EU Commission, which gave the Swedish Transport Administration the right to have their agreements for themselves. Mora Municipality has chosen not to procure its own line because it would mean significantly higher costs. The train is considered a future means of transport, unless the government gives directions to the Swedish Transport Administration to procure the line. The Transport Administration only procured air routes where alternative transport (ground or other airport) to central Stockholm takes over four hours, and the train takes slightly less for Mora.

The new Sälen-Trysil Airport which opened in December 2019 has taken over the winter tourist flights. The last scheduled flights until 2023 went to and from Ängelholm in March 2019.

In 2023 Swedish Transport Administration decided to procure the Sveg-Arlanda flights to land in Mora also. Jonair (previous operator Sveg-Arlanda) was given the contract in March 2023 and flight will start in October 2023.

== Airlines and destinations ==
The following airlines operate regular scheduled and charter flights at Mora–Siljan Airport:

Airlines	Destinations
Jonair	Stockholm–Arlanda, Sveg

== See also ==
- List of the largest airports in the Nordic countries
