= Linköping/Saab Airport =

Linköping/Saab Airport Linköping/Saabs flygplats

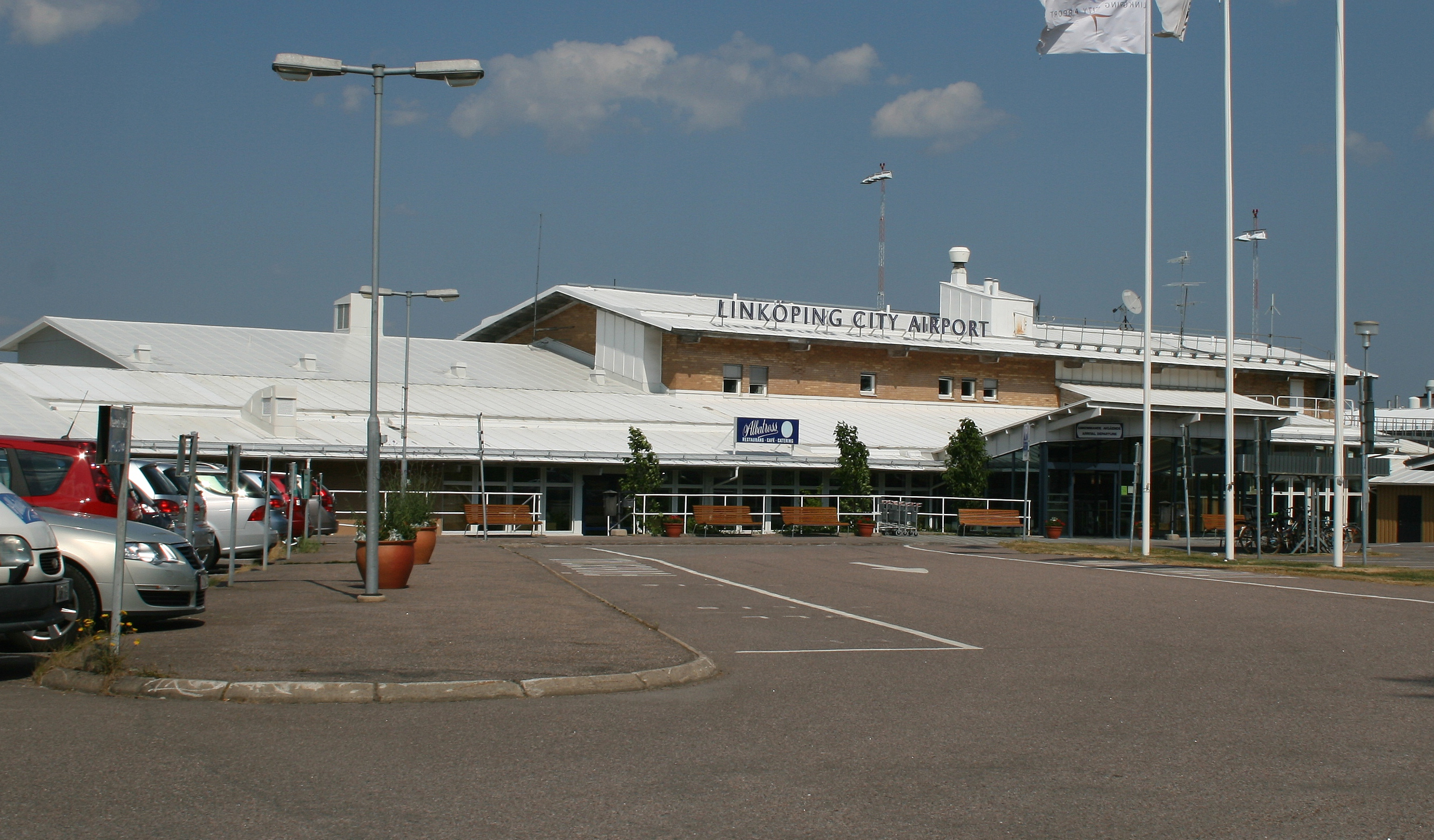
- IATA: LPI; ICAO: ESSL

Summary
- Airport type: Public
- Owner: Saab AB
- Operator: Saab Airport AB; Linköping City Airport AB (owned by Linköping municipality).
- Location: Linköping, Sweden
- Elevation AMSL: 172 ft / 52 m
- Coordinates: 58°24′30″N 015°40′22″E
- Website: www.linkopingcityairport.se

Map
- Location within Sweden

Runways
Direction	Length		Surface
Direction	m	ft	Surface
11/29	2,130	6,998	Asphalt

Statistics (2019)
- Passengers total: 143.900
- Domestic passengers: 685
- International passengers: 144.585
- Source: DAFIF

Linköping/Saab Airport (IATA: LPI, ICAO: ESSL), branded as Linköping City Airport, is situated in Linköping, Sweden. The airport is shared between civil aviation and Saab.

== Airlines and destinations ==
The following airlines operate regular scheduled and charter flights at Linköping/Saab Airport:

Airlines	Destinations
KLM	Amsterdam
Lygg	Helsinki, Örebro

== See also ==
- List of the largest airports in the Nordic countries
