= Stockholm Skavsta Airport =

Airport serving Stockholm, Sweden

Stockholm Skavsta Airport Stockholm Skavsta flygplats

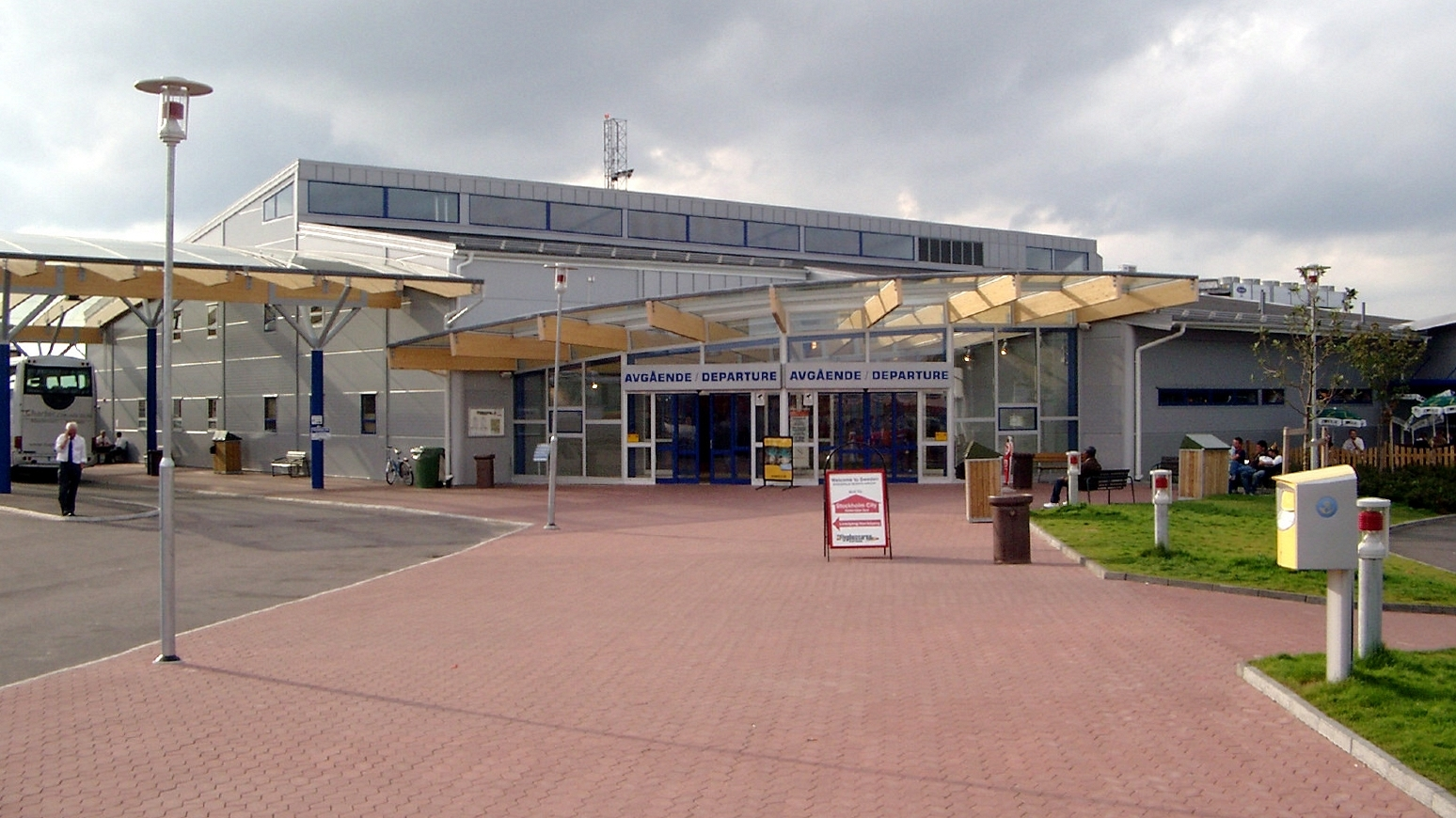
- IATA: NYO; ICAO: ESKN

Summary
- Owner: Arlandastad Group AB (90.1%); Nyköping Municipality (9.9%)
- Serves: Stockholm, Nyköping
- Location: Nyköping Municipality
- Opened: 23 September 1984; 42 years ago
- Elevation AMSL: 142 ft (43 m)
- Coordinates: 58°47′19″N 016°54′44″E
- Website: www.skavsta.se

Map
- Location within Södermanland County NYO/ESKN (Sweden)

Runways
Direction	Length		Surface
Direction	m	ft	Surface
08/26	2,878	9,442	Asphalt
16/34	2,039	6,690	Asphalt

Statistics (2023)
- Number of passengers: 685,269
- Passenger change 22-23: ▲23%
- Source:, Swedish Transport Agency

Stockholm Skavsta Airport (Swedish: Stockholm Skavsta flygplats) (IATA: NYO, ICAO: ESKN), or Nyköping Airport is an international airport in Nyköping Municipality, Sweden, 5 km (3.1 mi) northwest of Nyköping and approximately 100 km (62 mi) southwest of Stockholm. It is served primarily by low-cost airlines and cargo operators. The airport handled a total of 364,603 passengers in 2024, making it Sweden's 7th-busiest airport.

The airport is located far outside Stockholm Municipality and Stockholm County, but is included in STO, the IATA airport code for Stockholm airports. Locally the airport is referred to simply as Skavsta. Stockholm's main international airport is Stockholm Arlanda Airport.

== History ==
=== Establishment and military use (1940s–1980s) ===
The airfield was established between 1940 and 1941 and was initially part of the Nyköping garrison. Named Nyköping-Oxelösund Airport (Nyköping-Oxelösunds flygplats) It was primarily used by Södermanland Wing (F11) until the wing was decommissioned on 30 June 1980, although some military activities continued in the area until 1985.

=== Conversion to a civilian airport (1980s–1990s) ===
In November 1983, an agreement was reached between the state and Nyköping Municipality regarding the future of the airport. In September 1984, the airport was inaugurated as a civil airport under the management of the municipality. In 1987 the terminal building was inaugurated. The following year, the airport was renamed Stockholm Skavsta Airport (Stockholm Skavsta flygplats) to facilitate marketing and booking systems linked to Stockholm.

In 1995, charter services started operating from Skavsta, with flights to Turkey introducing duty-free sales at the airport. The growth of charter operators continued throughout the 1990s, with operators such as Ving, Always, Spies, and Fritidsresor establishing routes from Skavsta.

In June 1997, Ryanair launched its first flight from Stockholm Skavsta to London Stansted Airport. This move marked the entry of low-cost carriers into the Swedish market. Before Ryanair's arrival, the lowest round-trip fare from Stockholm to London was approximately 2,065 SEK with Malmö Aviation, while Ryanair's fare from Skavsta was approximately 990 SEK.

In 1998, Nyköping Municipality sold 90.1% of the ownership of Stockholm Skavsta Airport to the British airport operating company TBI Limited, with the municipality retaining a 9.9% stake. This sale was part of TBI's strategy to acquire and manage several airports, which included London Luton Airport, Belfast International Airport, and Orlando Sanford International Airport.

=== Growth as Low-Cost carrier airport (2000s–2019) ===
In April 2003, Ryanair established its first Scandinavian base at Stockholm Skavsta Airport. The airline stationed three Boeing 737-800 aircraft there, and expanded its route network to destinations across Europe including Glasgow, Frankfurt, Hamburg, Paris, Oslo, Aarhus and Tampere. In July 2004, Wizz Air began operations at Skavsta, with flights to destinations in Eastern Europe including Warsaw and Budapest.

In early 2005, the Spanish ACDL group acquired TBI Limited, which owned and managed the airport. This ownership structure remained in place until 2013, when most of ACDL's airport assets, including Skavsta, were sold to the Canadian pension fund OMERS Strategic Investments.

In October 2007, Ryanair launched six new routes from Stockholm Skavsta Airport. The newly introduced destinations included Baden-Baden, Basel, Berlin, Bratislava, Pisa, and Valencia. This expansion was facilitated by the addition of Boeing 737-800 aircraft, bringing the total number of Ryanair aircraft based at Skavsta to six. Ryanair estimated that approximately 2.5 million passengers would use these new routes.

Skavsta's passenger numbers peaked in 2011, with 2,581,639 passengers using the airport.

In August 2018, the French company VINCI Airports, which operated 46 airports worldwide at the time, took over the majority 90.1% share of the airport. Between 2018 and 2020 Skavsta was Sweden's third busiest airport.

=== Pandemic, Ryanair withdrawal and return to Swedish ownership (2020–present) ===
The COVID-19 pandemic had a severe impact on Stockholm Skavsta Airport, pushing it to the brink of bankruptcy. The airport experienced a drastic reduction in passenger traffic, with January 2021 seeing approximately 85% fewer passengers compared to the same month in 2020. In March 2020 the airport furloughed around 120 employees, as flight traffic came to a near standstill with only a handful of departures per week.

In May 2021, Ryanair announced it would relocate all routes from Skavsta to Stockholm Arlanda Airport by October 2021. After initially claiming the option to leave some operations from Skavsta, Ryanair left the airport entirely on 30 October 2021. The dual impact of the COVID-19 pandemic and Ryanair's departure from Skavsta resulted in a 70% reduction in passenger numbers at Stockholm Skavsta Airport between 2019 and 2023.

In April 2022, Vinci Airports sold its 90.1% stake in Stockholm Skavsta Airport to the Swedish real estate company Arlandastad Group AB for a purchase price of SEK 117 million, of which SEK 29 million was paid in cash and the rest through the assumption of debts.

In October 2023, Wizz Air relocated two major routes to Budapest and Gdansk from Skavsta to Arlanda.

In December 2022, Norwegian Air announced plans to start operating flights from Stockholm Skavsta Airport in April 2023, marking its debut at the airport with seasonal routes to Malaga and Alicante. The inaugural flights took place on 1 and 2 April 2023. This was followed by the introduction of flights to Palma de Mallorca starting 1 May 2023. In January 2024 Norwegian announced that it would expand to year-round flights to Malaga and Alicante from November 2024.

== Other operations ==
In 2023 Stockholm Skavsta Airport was designated as an official contingency airport (Beredskapsflygplats) by the Swedish government. This new status means the airport is available for essential air transport services 24/7, including for healthcare, rescue services, firefighting aircraft, and total defence needs.

The Swedish Coast Guard commenced its aviation operations at Skavsta Airport in 1986 and has maintained it as its primary base since the 1990s. The Coast Guard's three Bombardier Dash 8 Q-300 aircraft are based at Skavsta.

The F11 Museum, inaugurated in 1991, is located at Stockholm Skavsta Airport. It showcases Sweden's military aviation history from 1941 to 1980, featuring preserved aircraft, flight simulators and educational exhibits, reflecting the evolution of Swedish air reconnaissance during World War II and the Cold War.

Because the airport is located 43 kilometres (27 mi) from Harpsund, the official leisure residence for the Prime Minister of Sweden, to which foreign heads of governments sometimes are invited, Skavsta is sometimes used for flights for a head of government.

The Swedish Border Police have a station at Stockholm Skavsta Airport.

== Airlines and destinations ==
The following airlines offer scheduled services to and from Stockholm Skavsta Airport:

Airlines	Destinations
Norwegian Air Shuttle	Alicante, Málaga; Seasonal: Gran Canaria, Palma de Mallorca
Ryanair	Gdańsk (begins March 28, 2027)
Wizz Air	Belgrade, Warsaw–Chopin

== Statistics ==
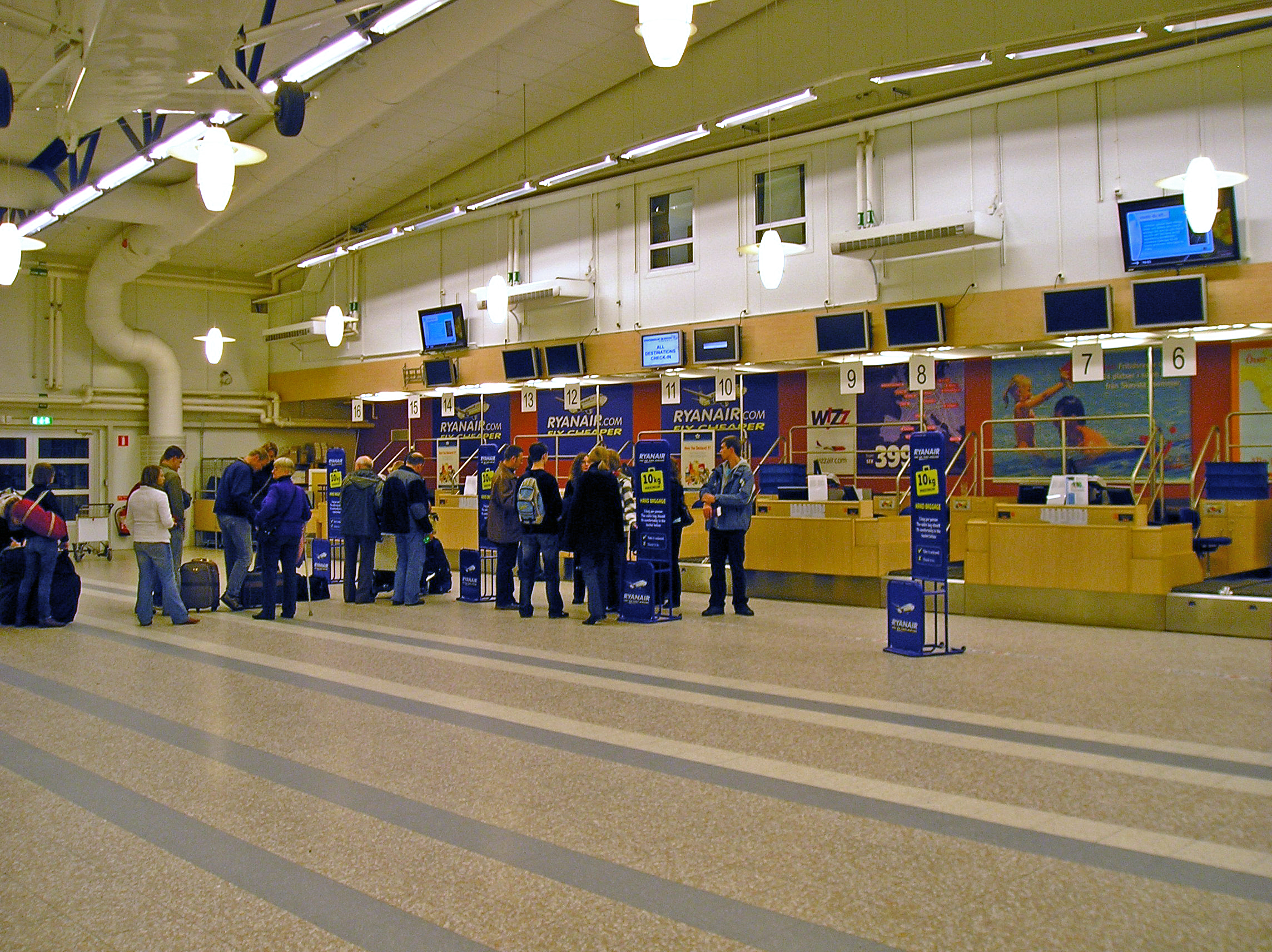
Check-in hall

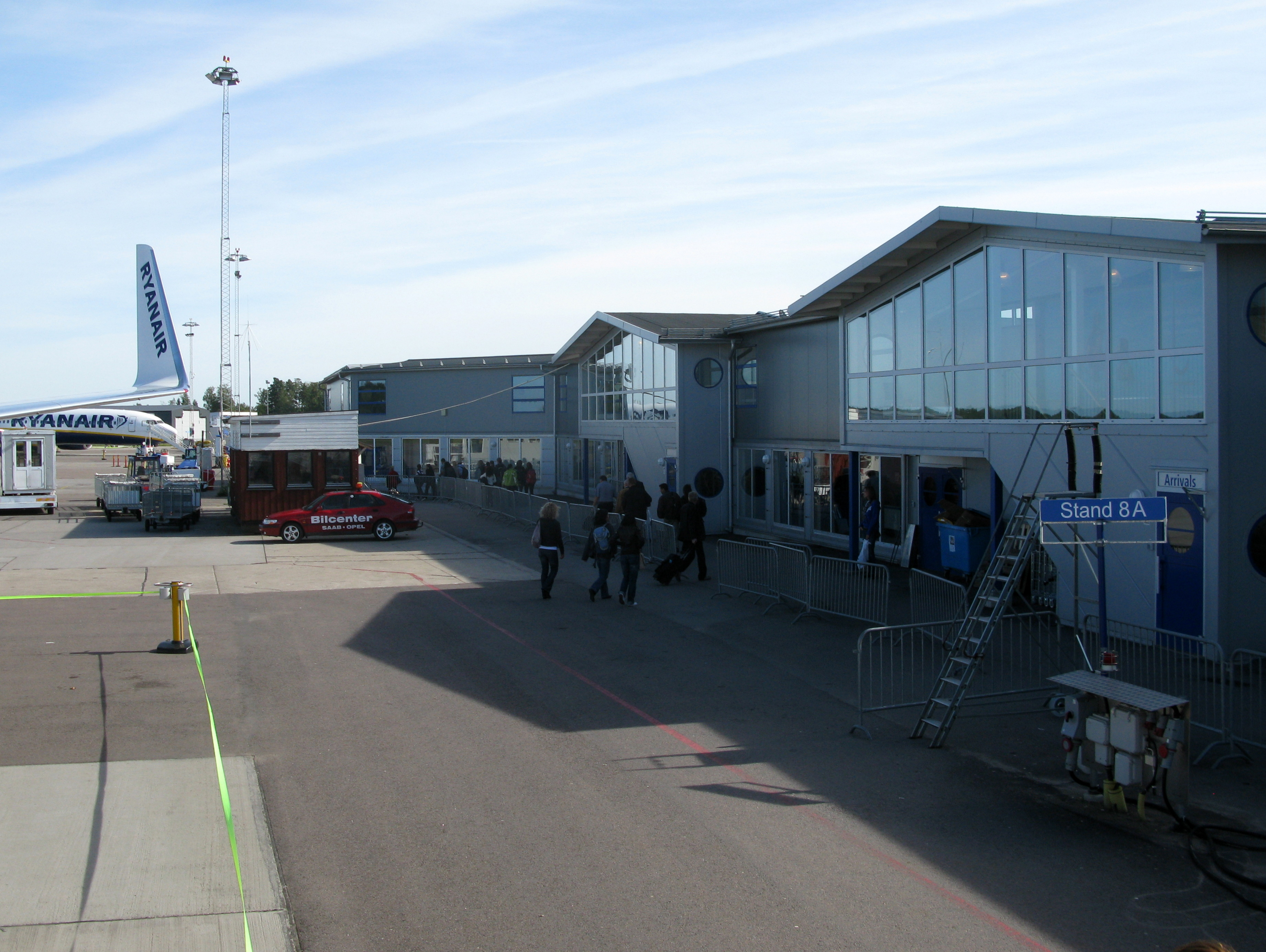
Apron view

Year	Passengers	Change
2008	2,479,887	N.D.
2009	2,525,227	+1.8%
2010	2,513,046	-0.5%
2011	2,583,934	+2.8%
2012	2,321,908	-10.1%
2013	2,169,587	-6.6%
2014	1,658,238	-23.6%
2015	1,813,032	+9.3%
2016	2,008,372	+11.9%
2017	2,106,773	+4.9%
2018	2,199,119	+4.4%
2019	2,296,815	+4.4%
2020	573 229	-75.0%
2021	613 030	+6.9%
2022	555 622	-9.4%
2023	685 269	+23.3%

== Ground transportation ==
=== Car ===
Both short and long-term parking facilities are available. The terminal can be reached by foot from all parking areas. The road distance from Stockholm is 108 kilometres (67 mi).

=== Coach and bus ===
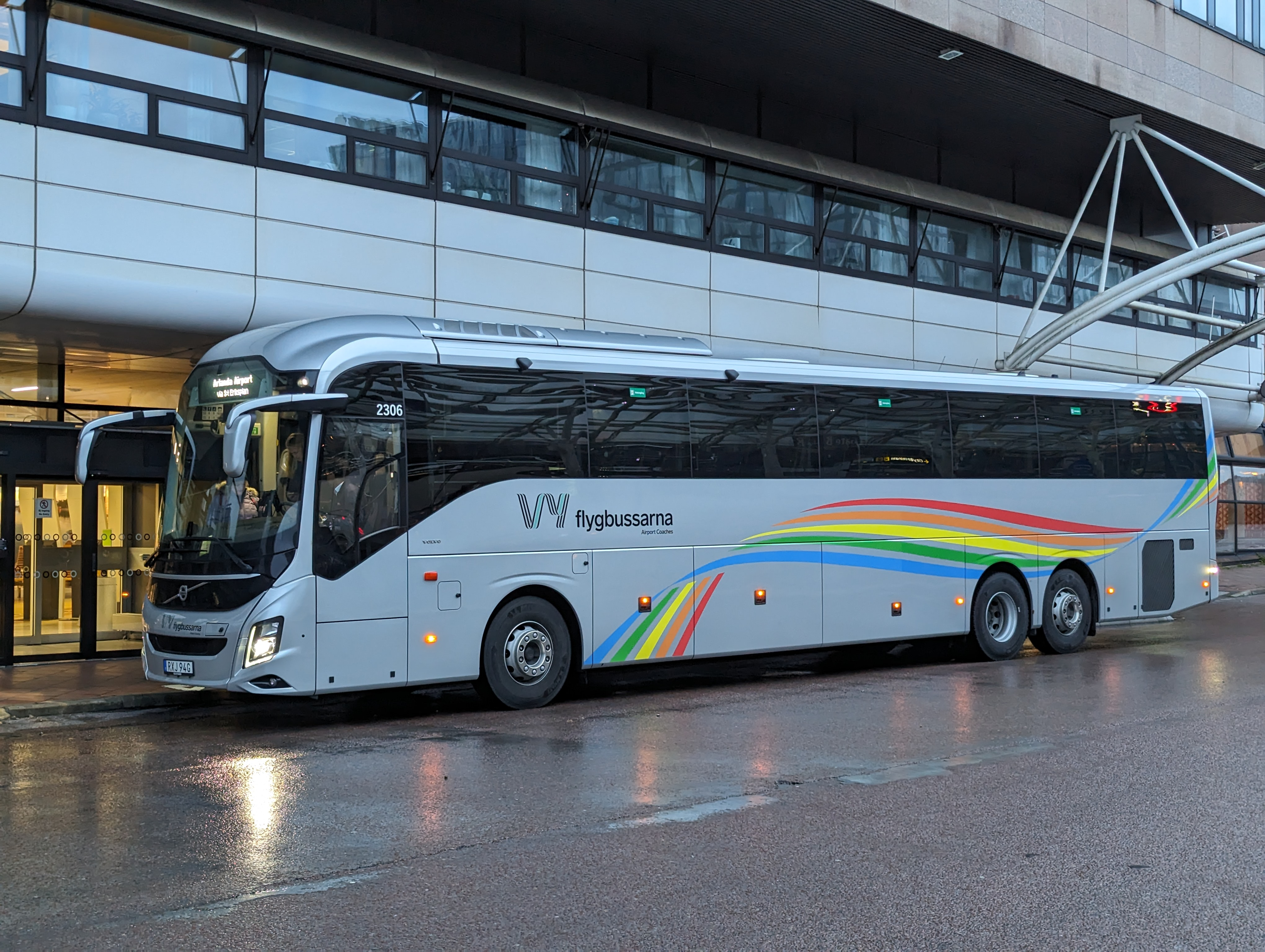
A Flygbussarna Airport Coach at Cityterminalen

Flygbussarna operate coaches directly between Stockholm Skavsta Airport and Cityterminalen Bus Terminal in Central Stockholm. These are scheduled according to the flight schedule, and the journey time is approximately 90 minutes. There are also airport buses to Södertälje, Linköping, Norrköping, and local stops in the southern parts of Stockholm. Local bus services are available to Nyköping's city centre and its railway station.

=== Train ===
The railway station in Nyköping is 7 kilometres (4 mi) away. It is served by regional trains (operated by Mälartåg) on the Norrköping–Stockholm route. Local buses and taxis provide connections to the airport.

=== Future high speed rail connection ===
Ostlänken's Planned Route

The East Link (Ostlänken) high-speed rail project is planned to include a station at Skavsta Airport, to be opened by 2035. This is expected reduce the travel time between Stockholm Central Station and Skavsta airport to 52 minutes, a journey which currently takes around 90 minutes by coach.

As part of the project, various existing structures at the airport will need to be modified, rebuilt, or relocated. In October 2023, the Swedish Transport Administration announced an agreement to provide SEK 385 million to the Arlandastad Group in compensation for the works.

== Accidents and incidents ==
- On 9 October 1974, a Tp 79 s/n 79005 of the Swedish Air Force crashed on approach to Nyköping Airport. All 27 people on board survived.

== See also ==
- List of the largest airports in the Nordic countries
- Södermanland County
- Nyköping Municipality
