= Örebro Airport =

Örebro Airport Örebro flygplats

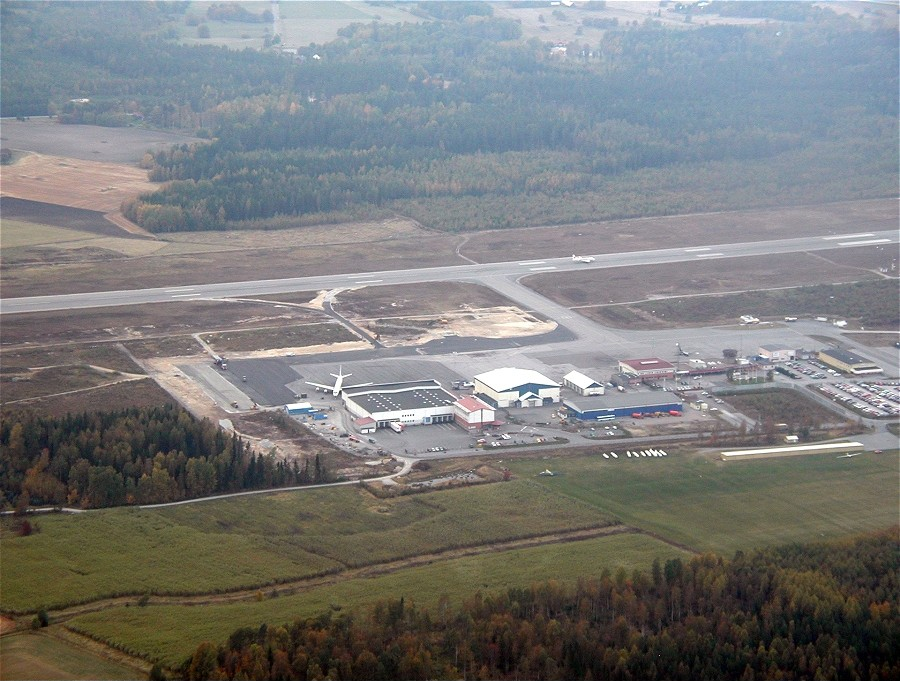
- IATA: ORB; ICAO: ESOE

Summary
- Airport type: Public
- Operator: Örebro Läns Flygplats AB
- Location: Örebro
- Elevation AMSL: 188 ft (57 m)
- Coordinates: 59°13′25″N 015°02′17″E
- Website: orebroairport.se

Map
- Location within Sweden

Runways
| Direction | Length | | Surface |
| Direction | ft | m | Surface |
|---|---|---|---|
| 01/19 | 10,728 | 3,270 | Asphalt |

Statistics (2023)
- Passengers total: 80,694
- International passengers: 79,119
- Domestic passengers: 1,575
- Landings total: 3,060
- Statistics: Swedish Transport Agency

Örebro Airport (IATA: ORB, ICAO: ESOE) is located 10 kilometers southwest of Örebro and is Sweden's 23rd-largest passenger airport and the fourth-largest cargo airport. It was opened in 1979. The airport handled approximately 48,648 passengers in 2025. The airport is one of Sweden's designated contingency airports and is required to remain open 24 hours a day to receive air ambulances, firefighting aircraft, Coast Guard aircraft, and other essential service aircraft.

== Airlines and destinations ==
The following airlines operate regular scheduled and charter services to and from Örebro:

| Airlines | Destinations |
|---|---|
| Lygg | Helsinki, Linköping |
| Sunclass Airlines | Seasonal charter: Rhodes, Gran Canaria, Larnaca, Palma de Mallorca |

== Ground transportation ==
A coach service is operated by Let's Go By Bus Örebro between the airport and Örebro Central, with services timed to coincide with the Ryanair flights to and from London-Stansted on Fridays and Sundays. Tickets can be bought on the bus or on the FlixBus website. The nearest public bus stop, (about 2 km away) has services to and from the centre of Örebro. It is served by bus 620 on weekdays and bus 600 at weekends. Other transport alternatives will likely involve a car or taxi. Most flights are tourist charter which attracts child families who mostly use their car for transport. There are many parking spaces, which have a fee.

== Accidents and incidents ==
- On 8 July 2021, a single-engine DHC-2 Beaver carrying 8 skydivers plus 1 pilot crashed shortly after takeoff from Örebro Airport. All 9 people died.
