= Avitrans =

Swedish charter airline

IATA	ICAO	Call sign
2Q	ETS	EXTRANS
- Founded: 2004
- Ceased operations: 2010
- Hubs: was Växjö Småland Airport
- Fleet size: 12
- Headquarters: Stockholm, Sweden
- Website: http://www.avitrans.se/

Avitrans was a charter airline based in Stockholm, Sweden. It operated ad hoc passenger and cargo charters, as well as wet-leasing aircraft to other carriers. It started operations in 2004 and had 70 employees. Its main base was Växjö Airport. A large portion of their flights was performed for the travel organiser and partial owner Sverigeflyg, with brand names Blekingeflyg, FlySmåland, Gotlandsflyg, Kalmarflyg, Kullaflyg, and Sundsvallsflyg.

The company was closed in 2010.

== Fleet ==
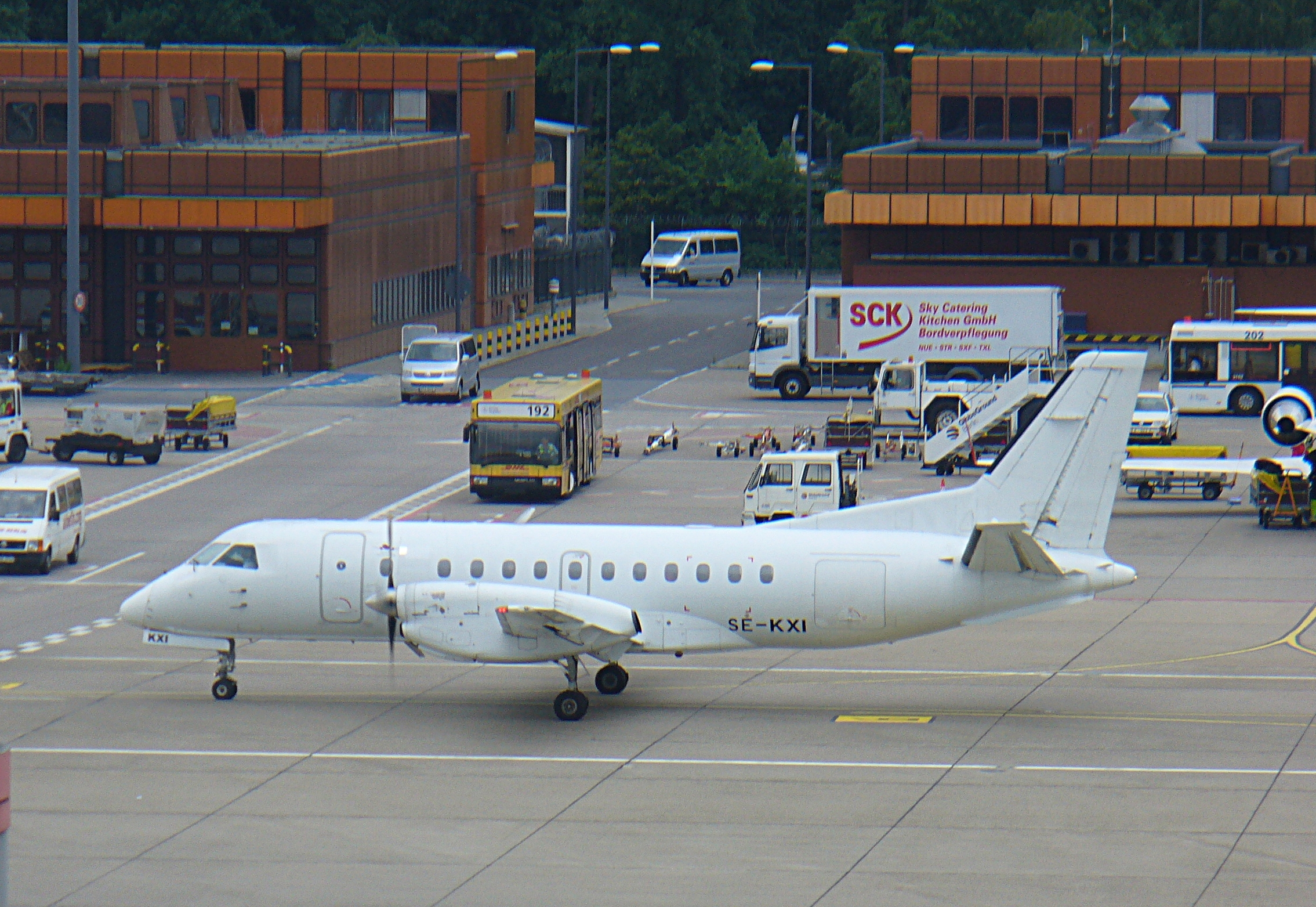
Saab 340 of Avitrans at Berlin Tegel Airport

The Avitrans fleet included the following aircraft (as of 31 March 2009) :

- 8 Saab 340A (two aircraft were operated for Air Åland, one aircraft is operated for Blekingeflyg, one aircraft is operated for Kalmarflyg and one aircraft is operated for Wingo xprs)
- 4 Saab 340B (two aircraft were operated for Vildanden and one aircraft was operated for FlySmaland)

== See also ==
- Airlines
- Transport in Sweden
