= Braathens =

Braathens may refer to:

== Airlines ==
=== Active ===
- Braathens Regional Airlines, Swedish virtual airline operating wet lease flights primarily for Scandinavian Airlines
- Braathens Regional Airways, Swedish ACMI operator for its sister company Braathens Regional Airlines. Formerly Golden Air

=== Defunct ===
- Braathens ASA (1946–2004), Norwegian airline (1946–2004) which merged with Scandinavian Airlines to form SAS Braathens
- SAS Braathens (2004–2007), Norwegian airline formed in 2004 by the merger of Braathens ASA into Scandinavian Airlines
- Braathens Regional Aviation (1981–2020), Swedish domestic airline providing wet-lease services and domestic routes
- Braathens International Airways (2022–2025), Swedish airline providing charter services for package holiday providers under its own AOC
- Braathens Helikopter (1989–1993), Norwegian helicopter airline

== People ==
- Ludvig G. Braathen, Norwegian entrepreneur, founder of Braathens SAFE

== Companies ==
- Braganza (company), Swedish holding company owned by Per G. Braathen, with interests in aviation and tourism
