= Sverigeflyg =

Virtual regional airline of Sweden (2001–2016)

IATA	ICAO	Call sign
DC	BRX	BRAATHENS
- Founded: 2001
- Ceased operations: 29 February 2016 (merged with Malmö Aviation to form Braathens Regional Aviation)
- Hubs: Stockholm Bromma Airport
- Fleet size: 10
- Destinations: 15
- Parent company: Braganza (2011–2016)
- Headquarters: Stockholm
- Founders: Pigge Werkelin; Michael Juniwik
- Website: www.sverigeflyg.se

Sverigeflyg was the main brand for the seven Swedish regional airlines Blekingeflyg, FlySmaland, Golden Air, Gotlandsflyg, Kalmarflyg, Kullaflyg, and Sundsvallsflyg. The actual air operator of all of their flights however was Braathens Regional. In March 2016, Sverigeflyg and Malmö Aviation merged into the new BRA Braathens Regional Airlines.

== History ==
Sverigeflyg was founded in 2001 by Chairman of the board Pigge Werkelin and CEO Michael Juniwik, both from Gotland. In 2011 the majority of the shares in Sverigeflyg was bought by Braathens Aviation. Sverigeflyg was part of ELFAA.

== Destinations ==
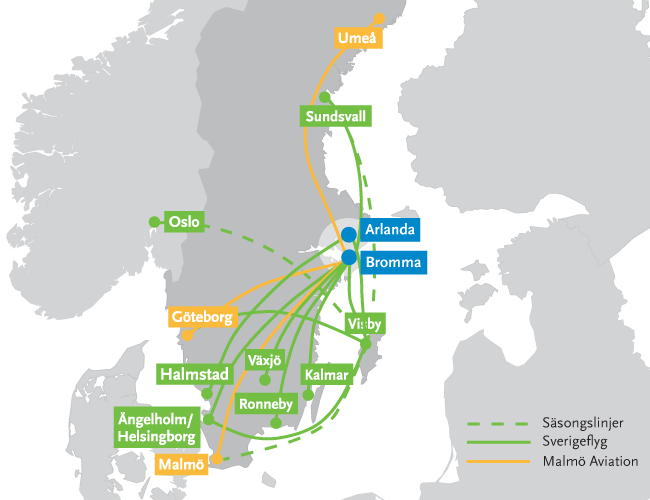
Sverigeflyg route map 2012

The following routes were offered by Sverigeflyg's brands as of December 2015:

Finland

- Helsinki - Helsinki Airport (Summer)

Sweden

- Gothenburg - Göteborg Landvetter Airport
- Halmstad - Halmstad Airport
- Kalmar - Kalmar Airport
- Malmö - Malmö Airport
- Mora - Mora Airport (Winter)
- Norrköping - Norrköping Airport (Summer)
- Ronneby - Ronneby Airport
- Stockholm - Stockholm-Bromma Airport
- Sundsvall - Sundsvall Airport
- Trollhättan - Trollhättan-Vänersborg Airport
- Umeå - Umeå Airport (Summer)
- Visby - Visby Airport
- Växjö - Växjö Airport
- Ängelholm - Ängelholm-Helsingborg Airport

== Fleet ==
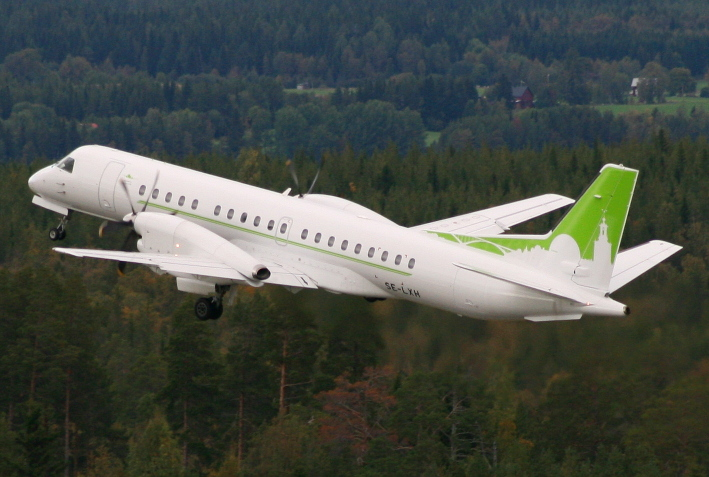
Sverigeflyg Saab 2000

As of December 2015 the Sverigeflyg fleet consisted of the following aircraft:

Sverigeflyg
Aircraft	In fleet	Orders	Passengers	Notes
ATR 72-500	5	0	72	Operated by Braathens Regional
ATR 72-600	1	4	72	Operated by Braathens Regional
Saab 2000	4	0	50	Operated by Braathens Regional
Total	10	4		

== See also ==
- Airlines
- Transport in Sweden
