= List of Braathens destinations =

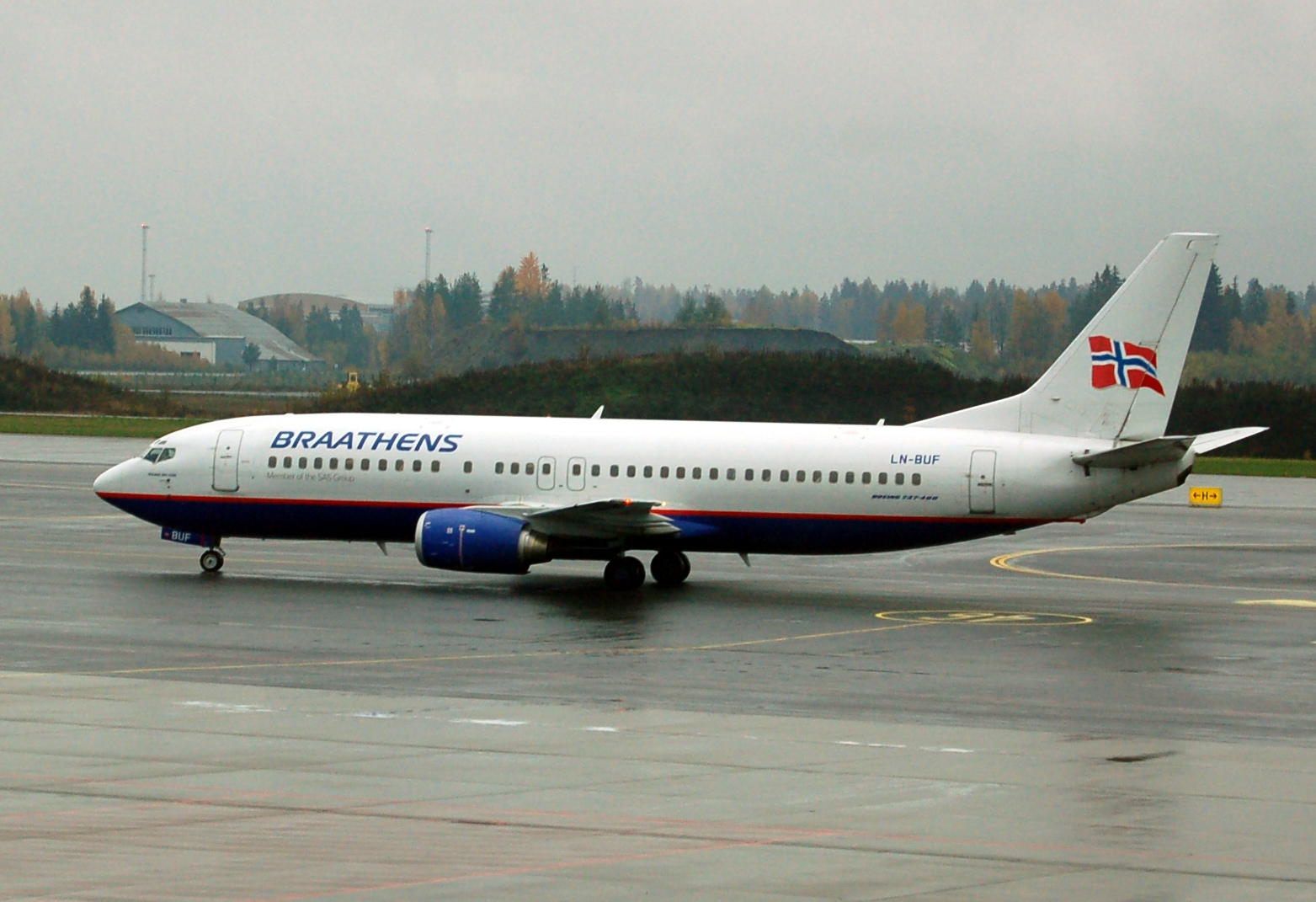
Boeing 737-400s were used by Braathens after 1989; this one is pictured at Oslo Airport, Gardermoen in 2006.

Braathens (until 1998 known as Braathens SAFE) was a Norwegian scheduled and charter airline that operated from 1946 to 2004. The airline used 53 airports serving 50 destinations, 23 of which were in Norway and 6 in Sweden. Braathens provided international services to 24 airports serving 22 cities in 17 countries. Seven of these cities are in Asia, the rest in Europe. In addition, Braathens served numerous destinations as both a regular and an ad-hoc charter airline. Braathens' main hubs were Oslo Airport, Fornebu (1949–98), Oslo Airport, Gardermoen (1998–2007) and Stockholm Arlanda Airport (1997–99). The main technical base was at Stavanger Airport, Sola.

The destinations in Asia were served from 1949 to 1954. Then, Braathens became a domestic airline, and did not have international scheduled services again until 1987, except during part of 1960. From 1994, the airline market was deregulated, and Braathens was free to operate domestically and within the European Economic Area. In 1997, it bought Transwede and started domestic services in Sweden, but these were terminated in 1999. The company merged with the Norwegian division of Scandinavian Airlines System (SAS) in 2004 to create SAS Braathens.

== History ==
Braathens SAFE started as a charter airline, flying predominantly to the Far East and South America. In 1949, the airline was granted a concession on the Far East route that was flown until 1954, using Douglas DC-4s. The main airport in Norway was Oslo Airport, Fornebu, and the main technical base was at Stavanger Airport, Sola. From 1952 to 1960, the airline cooperated on flights to Reykjavík with the Icelandic airline Loftleidir. Braathens SAFE started domestic services in 1951, using de Havilland Herons on a route from Oslo via Tønsberg to Stavanger. Services from Oslo to Trondheim were introduced in 1953. This was supplemented with stops in Farsund and Kristiansand in 1955, and Hamar, Røros and Notodden the following year. However, with the delivery of the Fokker F-27s, many of the smaller airports were cut from the service. The airline started flying from Oslo to Ålesund and along the West Coast in 1958. During 1960, the airline flew a single season to Sandefjord and Aalborg, Denmark. Services to Bodø and Tromsø started in 1967, and Boeing 737-200s and Fokker F-28s were taken into use two years later. Kristiansund was added as a destination in 1970 and Molde two years later. The F-28s were retired in 1986, while services to Longyearbyen started the following year.

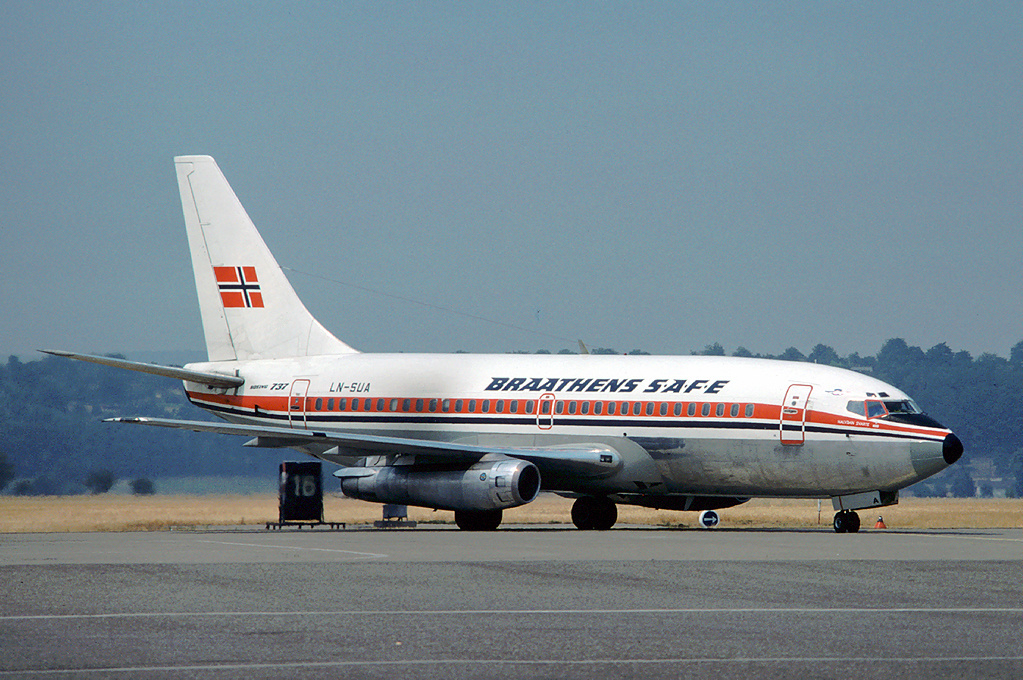
The Boeing 737-200 was the main domestic workhorse during the 1970s and 80s. Pictured at EuroAirport in 1976.

From 1987, Braathens SAFE was allowed to make international scheduled flights on certain routes. From 1989 to 1993, it opened routes to Billund, Malmö, Newcastle, London and Murmansk. In the same period, the airline replaced its fleet with Boeing 737-400 and -500s. The Norwegian airline market was deregulated in 1994, and Braathens SAFE was free to fly on any domestic and international route; it immediately opened routes to Harstad/Narvik. Within two years, international routes had been started to Jersey, Nice and Rome. In 1996, Braathens bought Sweden's second-largest airline, Transwede Airways, and started a route to Stockholm. The following year, Transwede was merged into Braathens SAFE, and the airline took over its domestic routes to Halmstad, Jönköping, Luleå, Sundsvall and Umeå, using Transwede's Fokker 100s. In 1997, KLM bought part of Braathens SAFE, and the two started a partnership; Braathens SAFE started flying from several Norwegian cities to KLM's hub in Amsterdam.

Boeing 737-700s were taken into use starting in 1998, and the company rebranded from Braathens SAFE to Braathens. That year also saw the opening of Oslo Airport, Gardermoen, which increased Braathens number of slots and allowed them to start a new route to Haugesund. Braathens started a costly price war with its competitors Color Air and SAS; after Color Air went bankrupt in 1999, Braathens started terminating routes, and the Swedish division was merged into the subsidiary Malmö Aviation. Málaga and Alicante were introduced as destinations in 2000. The next year, Braathens was bought by the SAS Group, and in 2002, the routes were split between SAS and Braathens. The latter kept only four international routes, but was granted new services to Northern Norway: Alta, Bardufoss, Kirkenes and Lakselv. Braathens was merged with SAS to create SAS Braathens in 2004.

== List of scheduled destinations ==
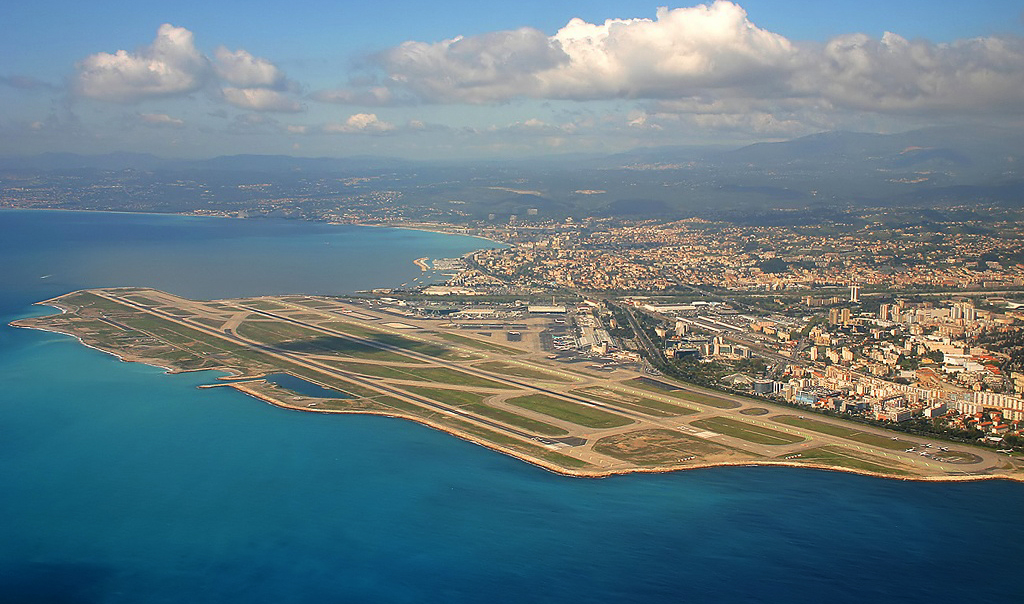
Nice Côte d'Azur Airport, in France, was first served by Braathens after airline deregulation in 1994.

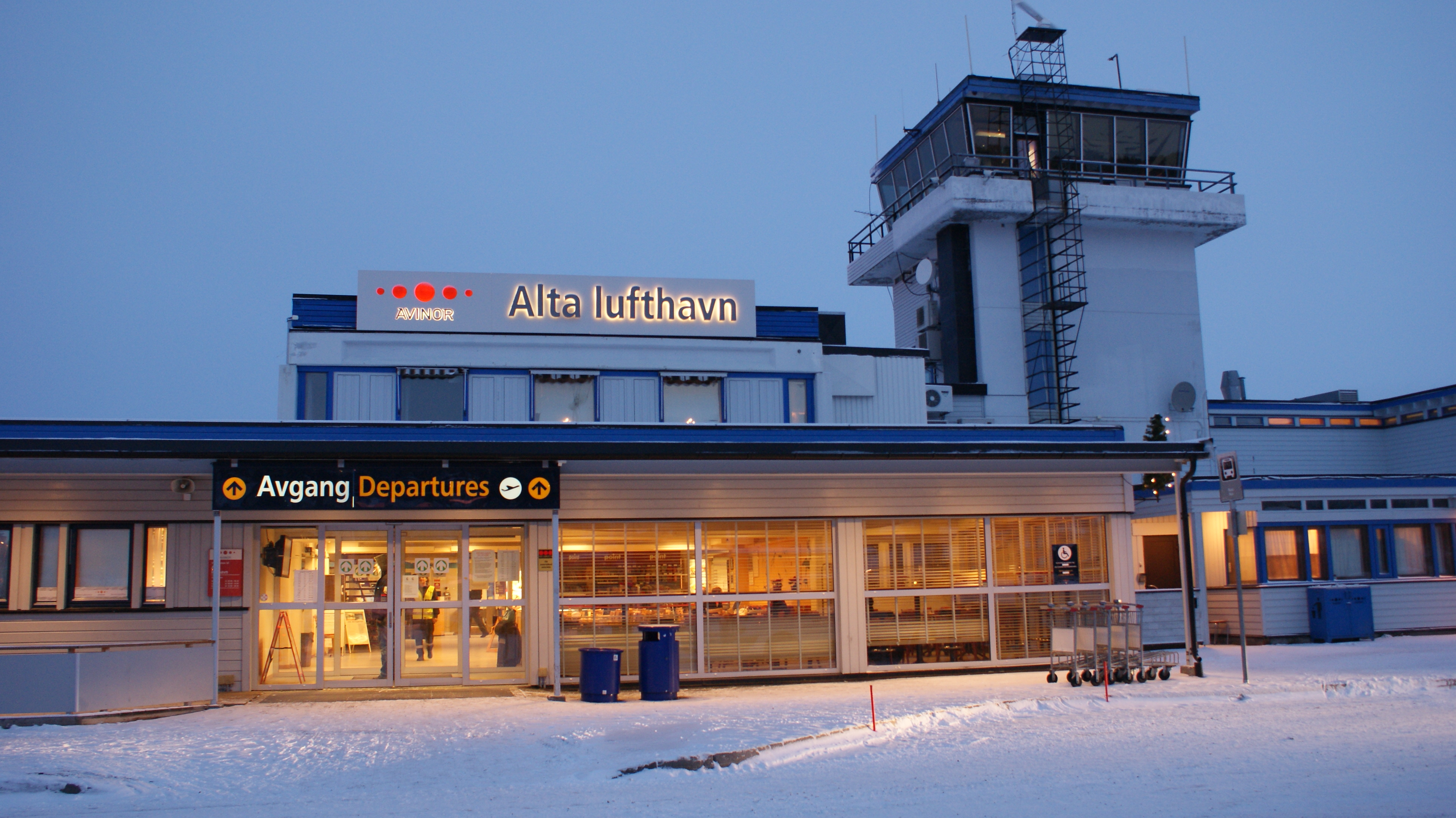
Alta Airport was first served by Braathens in 2002, when Braathens took over the route from SAS.

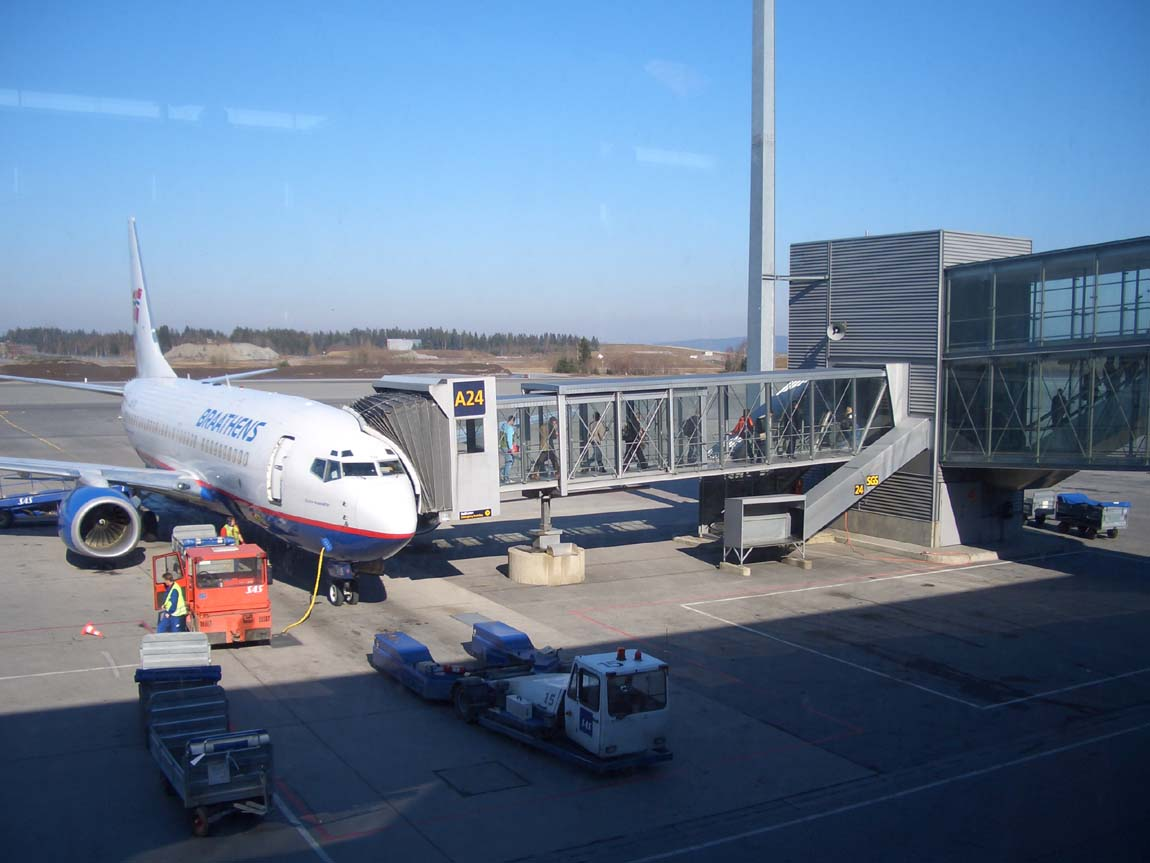
A Braathens Boeing 737-500 at Oslo Airport, Gardermoen, Braathens' Norwegian hub from 1998 to 2004

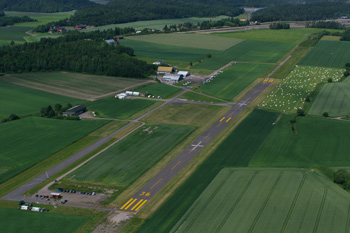
Tønsberg Airport, Jarlsberg, was dropped from the schedules because the runway was too short for the Fokker F-27.

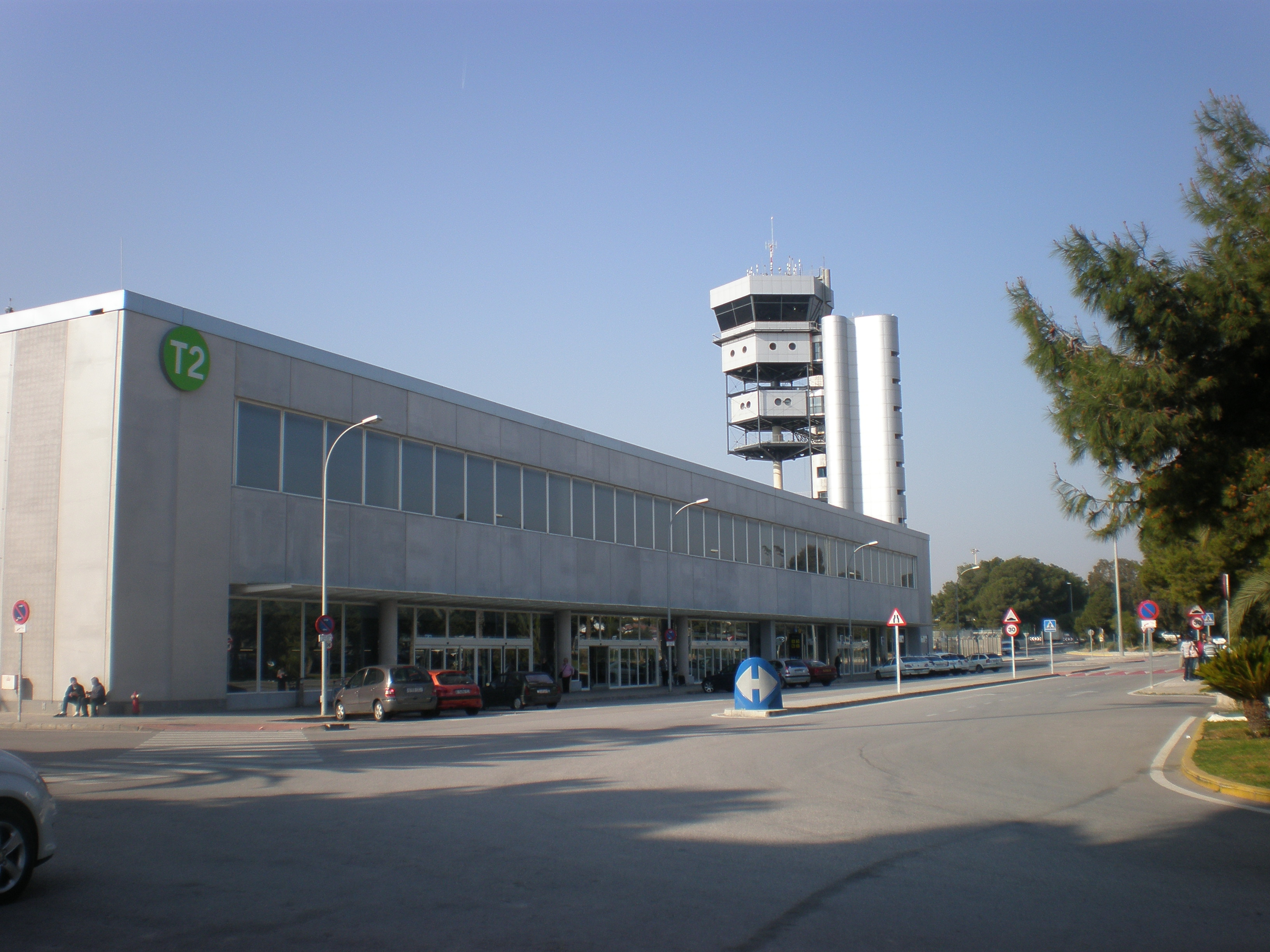
Alicante International Airport became a scheduled destination in 2000, having been served by charter flights four decades.

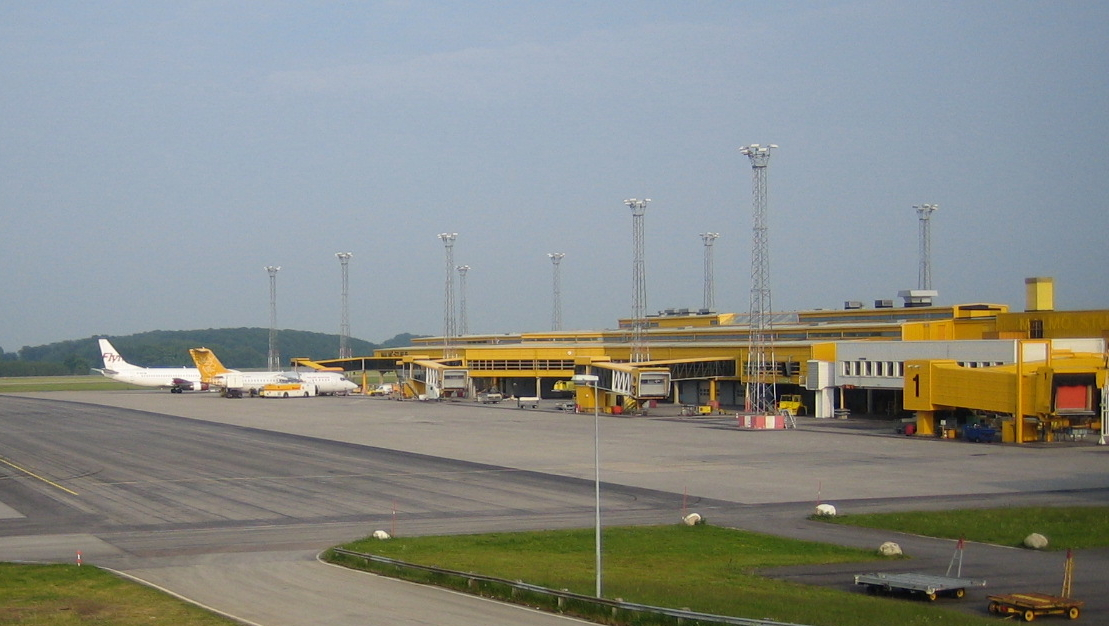
Braathens started flights from Oslo to Malmö Airport in 1991.

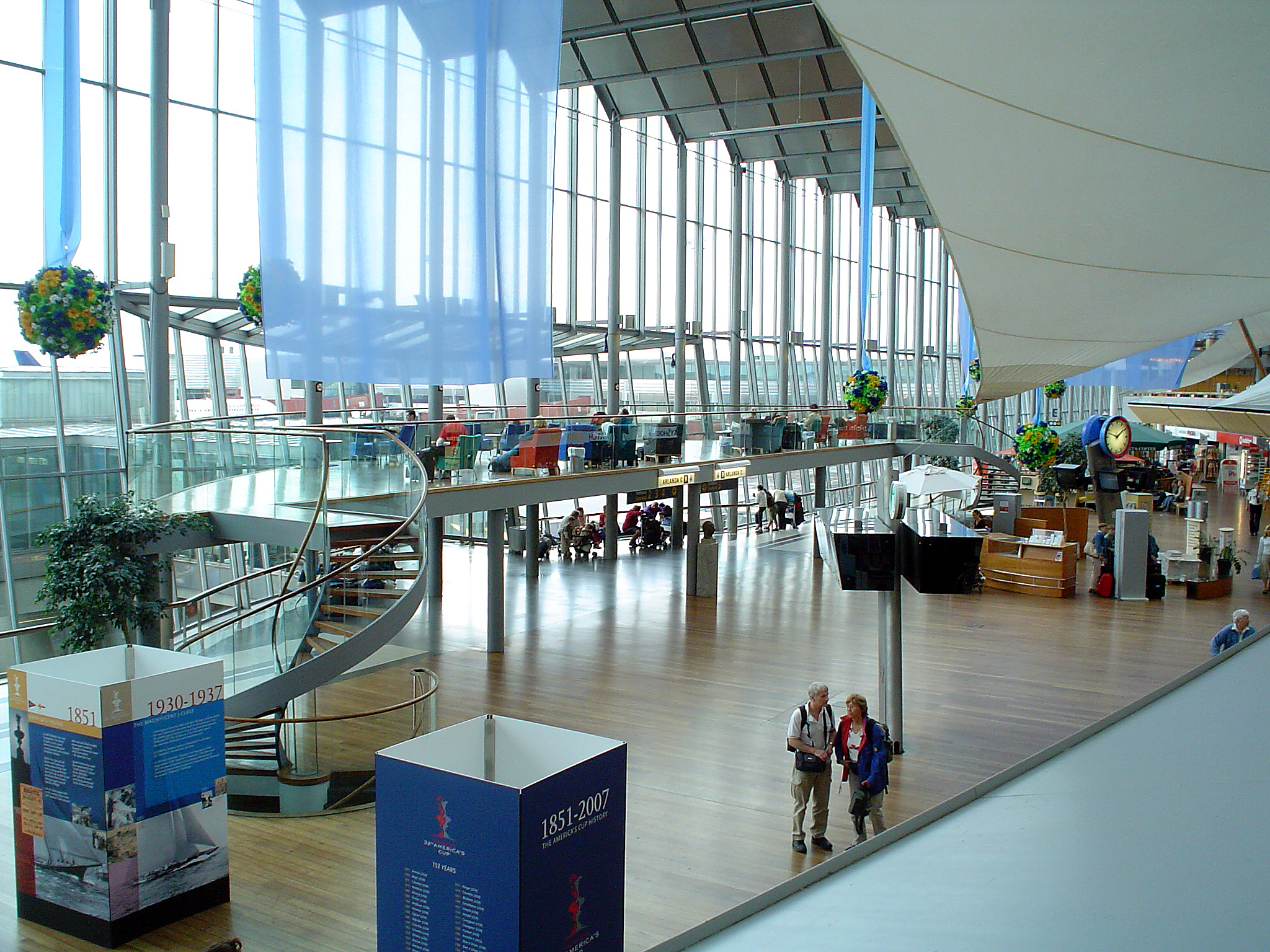
Terminal at Stockholm-Arlanda Airport, Braathens' Swedish hub from 1997 to 1999

The list shows airports that have been served by Braathens as part of its scheduled services between 1949 and 2004. It excludes airports where Braathens only operated charter services. The list includes the city, country, the codes of the International Air Transport Association (IATA airport code) and the International Civil Aviation Organization (ICAO airport code), and the airport's name, with the airline's hubs marked. The list also contains the beginning and end year of services, with destinations marked if the services was not continual. IATA and ICAO codes are not given for airports which were closed or converted to general aviation before being issued such codes.

The list includes destinations subcontracted to Busy Bee and later Norwegian Air Shuttle and operated as part of Braathens' network. It also includes Braathens' two subsidiaries in Sweden—Braathens Sverige and Malmö Aviation—although airports only served by Malmö Aviation are marked. Braathens Helikopter operated to seven offshore oil platforms in the Norwegian sector of the North Sea—these are not included in the list.

| † | Hub |
| * | Non-continuous service |
| # | Only served by Malmö Aviation |

| City | Country | IATA | ICAO | Airport | Begin | End | Ref |
|---|---|---|---|---|---|---|---|
| Aalborg | Denmark | AAL | EKYT | Aalborg Airport | 1960 | 1960 | |
| Alta | Norway | ALF | ENAT | Alta Airport | 2002 | 2004 | |
| Ålesund | Norway | AES | ENAL | Ålesund Airport, Vigra | 1958 | 2004 | |
| Alicante | Spain | ALC | LEAL | Alicante–Elche Miguel Hernández Airport | 2000 | 2004 | |
| Amsterdam | Netherlands | AMS | EHAM | Amsterdam Airport Schiphol | 1949* | 2002* | |
| Bangkok | Thailand | BKK | VTBD | Don Mueang International Airport | 1949 | 1954 | |
| Barcelona | Spain | BCN | LEBL | Josep Tarradellas Barcelona–El Prat Airport | 2000 | 2004 | |
| Bardufoss | Norway | BDU | ENDU | Bardufoss Airport | 2002 | 2004 | |
| Basra | Iraq | BSR | ORMM | Basra International Airport | 1949 | 1954 | |
| Bergen | Norway | BGO | ENBR | Bergen Airport, Flesland | 1958 | 2004 | |
| Bodø | Norway | BOO | ENBO | Bodø Airport | 1967 | 2004 | |
| Bombay | India | BOM | VABB | Chhatrapati Shivaji Maharaj International Airport | 1949 | 1954 | |
| Billund | Denmark | BLL | EKBI | Billund Airport | 1989 | 2002 | |
| Cairo | Egypt | CAI | HECA | Cairo International Airport | 1949 | 1954 | |
| Farsund | Norway | FAN | ENLI | Farsund Airport, Lista | 1955 | 1992 | |
| Geneva | Switzerland | GVA | LSGG | Geneva Airport | 1949 | 1954 | |
| Gothenburg | Sweden | GOT | ESGG | Göteborg Landvetter Airport^{#} | 1998 | 2004 | |
| Halmstad | Sweden | HAD | ESMT | Halmstad Airport | 1997 | 2004 | |
| Hamar | Norway | HMR | ENHA | Hamar Airport, Stafsberg | 1956 | 1958 | |
| Harstad/Narvik | Norway | EVE | ENEV | Harstad/Narvik Airport, Evenes | 1994 | 2004 | |
| Haugesund | Norway | HAU | ENHD | Haugesund Airport, Karmøy | 1984 | 2004 | |
| Hong Kong | Hong Kong | HKG | VHHH | Kai Tak Airport | 1949 | 1954 | |
| Jönköping | Sweden | JKG | ESGJ | Jönköping Airport | 1997 | 1999 | |
| Karachi | Pakistan | KHI | OPKC | Jinnah International Airport | 1949 | 1954 | |
| Kirkenes | Norway | KKN | ENKR | Kirkenes Airport, Høybuktmoen | 2002 | 2004 | |
| Kolkata | India | CCU | VACC | Netaji Subhas Chandra Bose International Airport | 1949 | 1954 | |
| Kristiansand | Norway | KRS | ENCN | Kristiansand Airport, Kjevik | 1955 | 2004 | |
| Kristiansund | Norway | KSU | ENKB | Kristiansund Airport, Kvernberget | 1970 | 2004 | |
| Lakselv | Norway | LKL | ENNA | Lakselv Airport, Banak | 2002 | 2004 | |
| London | United Kingdom | LCY | EGLC | London City Airport^{#} | 1998 | 2004 | |
| London | United Kingdom | LGW | EGKK | Gatwick Airport | 1992 | 1998 | |
| London | United Kingdom | STN | EGSS | London Stansted Airport | 1998 | 2002 | |
| Longyearbyen | Norway | LYR | ENSB | Svalbard Airport, Longyear | 1987 | 2002 | |
| Luleå | Sweden | LLA | ESPA | Luleå Airport | 1997 | 1999 | |
| Málaga | Spain | AGP | LEMG | Málaga Airport | 2000 | 2004 | |
| Malmö | Sweden | MMX | ESMX | Malmö Airport | 1991 | 2004 | |
| Molde | Norway | MOL | ENML | Molde Airport, Årø | 1972 | 2004 | |
| Murmansk | Russia | MMK | ULMM | Murmansk Airport | 1993 | 2000 | |
| Newcastle upon Tyne | United Kingdom | NCL | EGNT | Newcastle International Airport | 1991 | 2002 | |
| Nice | France | NCE | LFMN | Nice Côte d'Azur Airport | 1996 | 2004 | |
| Notodden | Norway | NTB | ENNO | Notodden Airport, Tuven | 1956 | 1958 | |
| Oslo | Norway | FBU | ENFB | Oslo Airport, Fornebu^{†} | 1949 | 1998 | |
| Oslo | Norway | OSL | ENGM | Oslo Airport, Gardermoen^{†} | 1998 | 2004 | |
| Reykjavík | Iceland | KEF | BIKF | Keflavík International Airport | 1952 | 1961 | |
| Rome | Italy | FCO | LIRF | Rome Fiumicino Airport | 1949* | 2002* | |
| Røros | Norway | RRS | ENRO | Røros Airport | 1957* | 1999* | |
| Saint Helier | Jersey | JER | EGJJ | Jersey Airport | 1996 | 2002 | |
| Sandefjord | Norway | TRF | ENTO | Sandefjord Airport, Torp | 1960* | 1999* | |
| Stavanger | Norway | SVG | ENZV | Stavanger Airport, Sola | 1949 | 2004 | |
| Stockholm | Sweden | ARN | ESSA | Stockholm Arlanda Airport^{†} | 1995 | 2000 | |
| Stockholm | Sweden | BMA | ESSB | Stockholm Bromma Airport^{#} | 1998 | 2004 | |
| Sundsvall | Sweden | SDL | ESNN | Sundsvall-Härnösand Airport | 1997 | 1999 | |
| Tønsberg | Norway | – | ENJB | Tønsberg Airport, Jarlsberg | 1952 | 1958 | |
| Tromsø | Norway | TOS | ENTC | Tromsø Airport | 1967 | 2004 | |
| Trondheim | Norway | – | – | Trondheim Airport, Lade | 1953 | 1956 | |
| Trondheim | Norway | TRD | ENVA | Trondheim Airport, Værnes | 1956 | 2004 | |
| Umeå | Sweden | UME | ESNU | Umeå Airport | 1997 | 1999 | |
