= Kullaflyg =

Swedish virtual airline

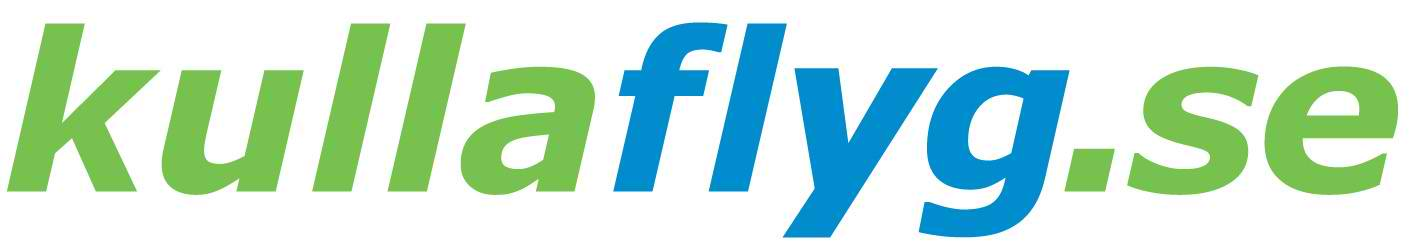
IATA	ICAO	Call sign
DC	BRX	Braathens
- Founded: 2003
- Operating bases: Ängelholm-Helsingborg Airport
- Fleet size: 3
- Destinations: 5
- Parent company: Sverigeflyg
- Headquarters: Ängelholm/Helsingborg, Sweden
- Key people: Christer Paulsson
- Website: http://www.kullaflyg.se/

Kullaflyg was an airline based in Ängelholm/Helsingborg, Sweden. They lease aircraft and pilots from the sister company Braathens Regional. Their own staff works partly as ground personnel and as cabin crew on the aircraft. As all subsidiaries of Sverigeflyg, Kullaflyg uses the callsign and codes of Braathens Regional.

In 2016, the Kullaflyg brand was, together with several other domestic airline brands, merged into the new BRA Braathens Regional Airlines.

== Destinations ==
Kullaflyg operated the following destinations from its hub at Ängelholm-Helsingborg Airport (as of summer 2015):

- Mora (seasonal, winter)
- Stockholm-Bromma
- Visby (seasonal, summer)

Kullaflyg operated the following destinations from its crew base at Halmstad Airport (as of summer 2015):

- Stockholm-Bromma

== Fleet ==
The Kullaflyg fleet consisted of the following aircraft (as of January 2014):

- 3 ATR 72-500

All aircraft were owned and operated by Braathens Regional.
