= Linjeflyg Flight 267V =

1964 aviation accident

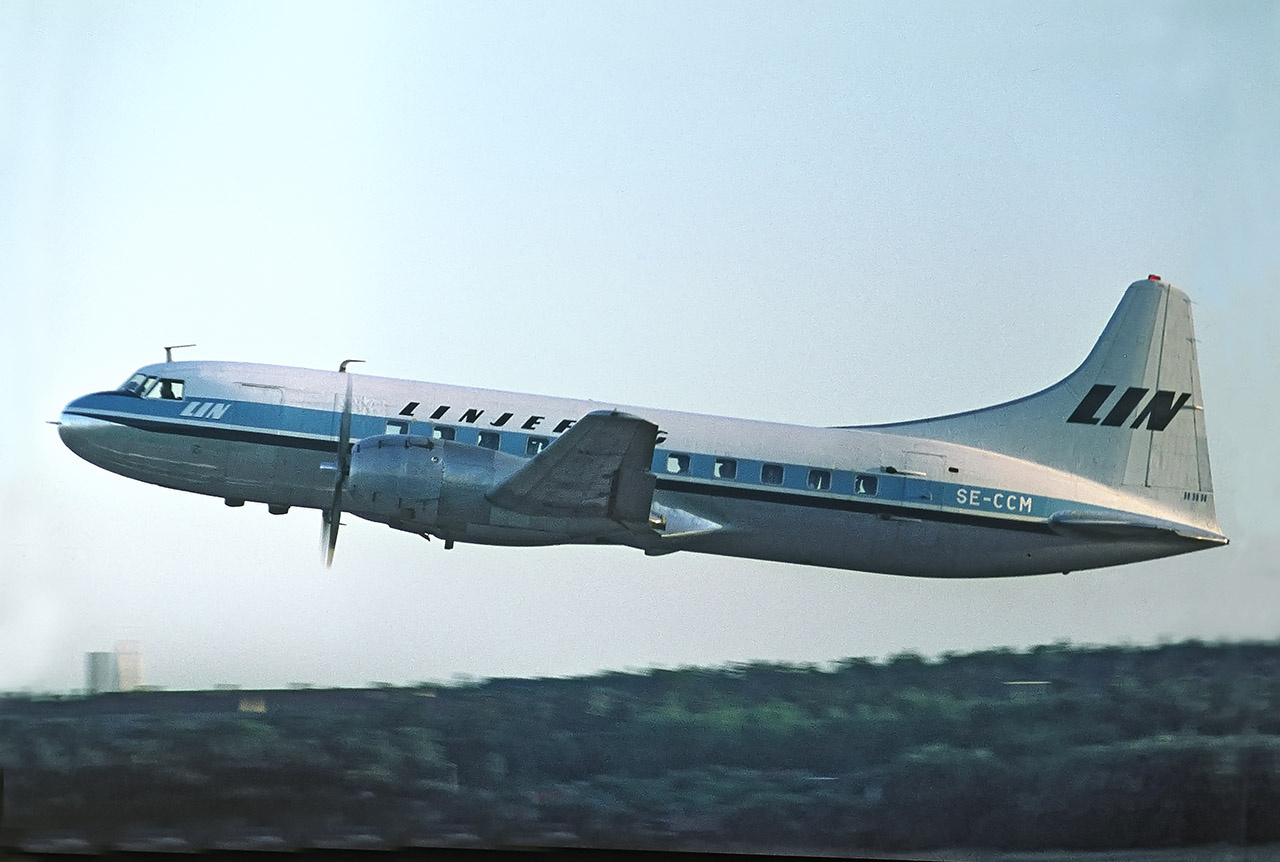
- A Linjeflyg Convair 440-75 Metropolitan sister-ship to the accident aircraft

Accident
- Date: 20 November 1964
- Summary: Controlled flight into terrain
- Site: Ängelholm, Sweden

Aircraft
- Aircraft type: Convair 440 Metropolitan
- Operator: Linjeflyg
- Registration: SE-CCK
- Flight origin: Stockholm Bromma Airport
- Stopover: Hultsfred Airport
- 2nd stopover: Halmstad Airport
- Destination: Ängelholm–Helsingborg Airport
- Occupants: 43
- Passengers: 39
- Crew: 4
- Fatalities: 31
- Injuries: 9
- Survivors: 12

Linjeflyg Flight 267V was a controlled flight into terrain by a Convair 440-75 Metropolitan on 20 November 1964 at 21:14 in Ängelholm, Skåne, Sweden. The Linjeflyg pilots, misled by a non-conventional military runway light configuration, descended too early and on a faulty course during approach to Ängelholm–Helsingborg Airport. The crash killed 31 of 43 people on board, making it the deadliest aviation accident in Sweden.

The flight was en route from Stockholm to Ängelholm, but bad weather caused it to skip stopovers at Hultsfred and Halmstad. There was less than 2.0 kilometers (1.2 mi) visibility and a low cloud base at Ängelholm, so air traffic control lit its approach lighting system. As the civilian sector at Swedish Air Force base F 10 Ängelholm, the airport had a military configuration and did not follow normal civilian configuration. This caused a misunderstanding in the navigation and the aircraft landed 2.0 kilometers (1.2 mi) before the runway threshold. The aircraft inverted while sliding after impact. Despite the death toll, three people walked uninjured from the crash.

The investigation commission found no fault of the pilot or air traffic control, instead focusing on short-cuts being taken by the Swedish Air Force and the Civil Aviation Administration (CAA) to not configure military airports in line with civilian regulations. The finding caused a surge of funding which subsequently caused military airports to change their instrument landing system and approach lighting system to meet civilian requirements.

== Flight ==
The accident aircraft was a Convair CV-340-62, which had been converted to a CV-440 Metropolitan. It had production date 23 June 1954 and was delivered to Real Transportes Aéreos of Brazil on 17 November 1955, where it was registered as PP-YRC. It became the property of Varig with the merger of the two airlines in August 1961. This made the aircraft superfluous and it was subsequently sold to Linjeflyg on 13 December 1961 through the holding company Airtaco. The aircraft was registered in Sweden on 14 March 1962 as SE-CCK. It was subsequently sent to Oslo for conversion to a CV-440. Ownership was transferred from Airtaco to its owner, Dagens Nyheter, in 1962. They sold it to Aerotransport on 1 October 1964.

Flight 267 was a scheduled, domestic service which was scheduled to fly from Stockholm Bromma Airport to Ängelholm–Helsingborg Airport, with intermediate stops at Hultsfred Airport and Halmstad Airport. Due to poor weather it was decided that the aircraft would not land at Hultsfred and the flight code was changed to Flight 267V to reflect this. The aircraft had a flight crew of four, of which one of the two flight attendants was under training. Thirty-nine passengers boarded the aircraft in Stockholm, including one child and three members of Parliament. It departed Bromma at 19:46. It cruised at an altitude of 3,600 meters (11,800 ft). While en route, increasing fog was observed at Halmstad and the meteorologist at Ängelholm recommended that the aircraft bypass Halmstad and fly directly to Ängelholm.

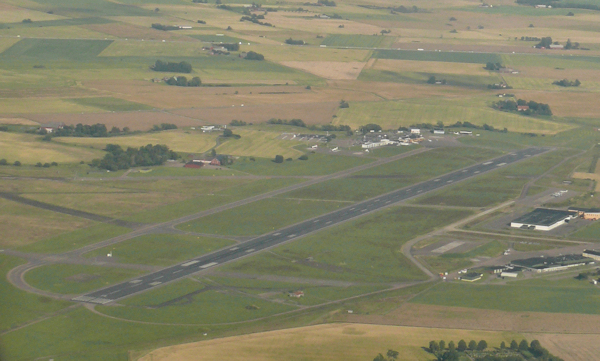
Aerial view of Ängelholm–Helsingborg Airport

Ängelholm–Helsingborg Airport was primarily a military air station, denoted F 10 Ängelholm. Because of this its instrument landing system was configured significantly different from most civilian airports. The runway's two radio beacons, LJ and J, were located at unusual distances from normal. LJ was situated 10.4 kilometers (6.5 mi) from the runway threshold instead of the normal 7 kilometers (4.3 mi) and J was located at 3,080 meters (10,100 ft) instead of the normal 1,200 meters (3,900 ft). Also, the approach lighting system's strobeacon was located 2,250 meters (7,380 ft) from and 110 meters (360 ft) starboard of the runway's center line, but this light was not indicated on the instrument, approach and landing chart. Therefore, any aircraft which would pass beacon and aimed for the approach light would be aligned to land right of the runway.

Ängelholm was experiencing rain and visibility between 1.5 and 2.0 kilometers (0.9 and 1.2 mi). The cloud base was only 60 meters (200 ft). The crew considered diverting to another suitable location, such as Malmö Bulltofta Airport and Copenhagen Airport, or even returning to Stockholm, but upon reaching Halmstad the pilots chose to make a direct approach to Ängelholm runway 14 using visual flight rules. Given the weather conditions this was a highly unusual landing plan: normal procedure would be to turn northwest and carry out an instrument approach instead.

== Accident ==
Ängelholm tower contacted the flight crew at 20:57 and issued the latest weather report, which was for a slight clearing. At 21:08 the pilots confirmed that they were at an altitude of 600 meters (2,000 ft) and that they were aiming for LJ. The tower informed the pilots that they had lit a strobeacon, which was (incorrectly) said to be located on the runway center line, 2.5 kilometers (1.6 mi) from the threshold (it was actually 110m off center, to the right). At 21:13:10 the tower commenced directing the flight of the aircraft, asking it to fly to the left, as the air traffic controller could see it was off course. The last transmission from the aircraft was made at 21:13:47.

The aircraft was off course and at too low an altitude. This was discovered by the pilots prior to impact and they attempted to pull the aircraft up, but hit a field with its starboard wing tip and landing gear. It succeeded at ascending slightly, but continued to fly nearly at ground level. Eighty meters (260 ft) later it collided with the overhead lines of the West Coast Railway Line, knocking off two concrete posts. It continued for another 170 meters (560 ft) before hitting ground, at which point it inverted. It slid for another 150 meters (490 ft) before coming to a halt, 40 meters (130 ft) from a house. Fire broke out in some of the wreck parts, although not in the main section of fuselage.

Thirty-one people on board were killed, including both the pilots. Three of the survivors were not injured, including the flight attendants. Some of the survivors were able to free themselves and each other and walk out of the fuselage. Most were hanging in their seat belts, wedged in by the wreckage. The fire departments in Ängelholm and Vejbystrand arrived at the scene eleven minutes after the crash and started freeing the survivors. The airport's rescue service was on the scene seventeen minutes after the accident. Nine people were seriously injured and were brought to the field hospital at the air base. The survivors were generally seated in the aft of the cabin. One of the passengers had brought their cat along in a cage on the flight, and it survived the accident.

== Investigation ==
An ad hoc investigation was appointed and later that night a Douglas DC-3 of officials and experts from the airline and the CAA were dispatched to Ängelholm. The commission carried out test flights to Ängelholm and concluded that it was fully possible for the pilot to mistake the strobeacon for the centerline lights, though the finding was not conclusive as the two types of lighting are still somewhat distinctive. Linjeflyg pilots reported that they had previously made the same mistake, but that the issue had otherwise always been detected and they had corrected their course, landing safely. A quarter of Linjeflyg's pilots were not aware of the strobeacon.

During the investigation there was a large media coverage of a dispute between the Swedish Airline Pilots Association (SPF) and the Swedish Air Traffic Controllers Association (SFTF). The former accused the F 10 air traffic control for not following correct civil aviation procedures. SFTF responded by an official letter to the government questioning why the pilots were represented in the commission, as this could pose a potential conflict of interest. Both parties were criticized for speculating about the cause of the accident before the conclusion of the commission.

The commission stated that the probable cause of the accident was that the crew had carried out a premature descent. This was caused by the crew misunderstanding the lighting arrangement at the airport due to lack of proper information about its configuration. The report did not criticize the pilots for choosing to land with visual flight rules, nor for carrying out the landing in the encountered weather conditions. The commission found that no individuals were at fault in the incident and that it had been caused by a series of system errors. It placed responsibility with both the CAA and the Air Force for the inadequate configuration of the lighting system and for not properly following civilian regulations at military airports.

== Aftermath ==
After the accident Linjeflyg resumed service to Ängelholm with Douglas DC-3 aircraft. The airline changed its procedures regarding landing at Ängelholm, making more strict policies in regard to minimum visibility. Both radio beacons were moved to the conventional civilian locations. Flight 267 was the seventh loss of a Convair CV-240 family aircraft. At the time it was the deadliest and now remains the fifth-deadliest accident of the type. The accident remains the deadliest aviation accident in Sweden. Linjeflyg would suffer one other fatal accident, Flight 618 in 1977, although it was a wet lease operated by Skyline.

The power balance between the CAA and the Swedish Air Force prior to the accident was skewed whereby the latter permitted civilian flights to their air bases on the condition that they did not interfere with military operations and procedures. The commission's findings caused an increased focus on safety by the Civil Aviation Administration and a shift in attitude. Specifically, the military air bases with joint traffic were reconfigured to meet international civil standards in their instrument landing and lighting systems. This was made possible because the government, in the wake of the accident, increased funding to the CAA to improve the systems.

== Gallery ==
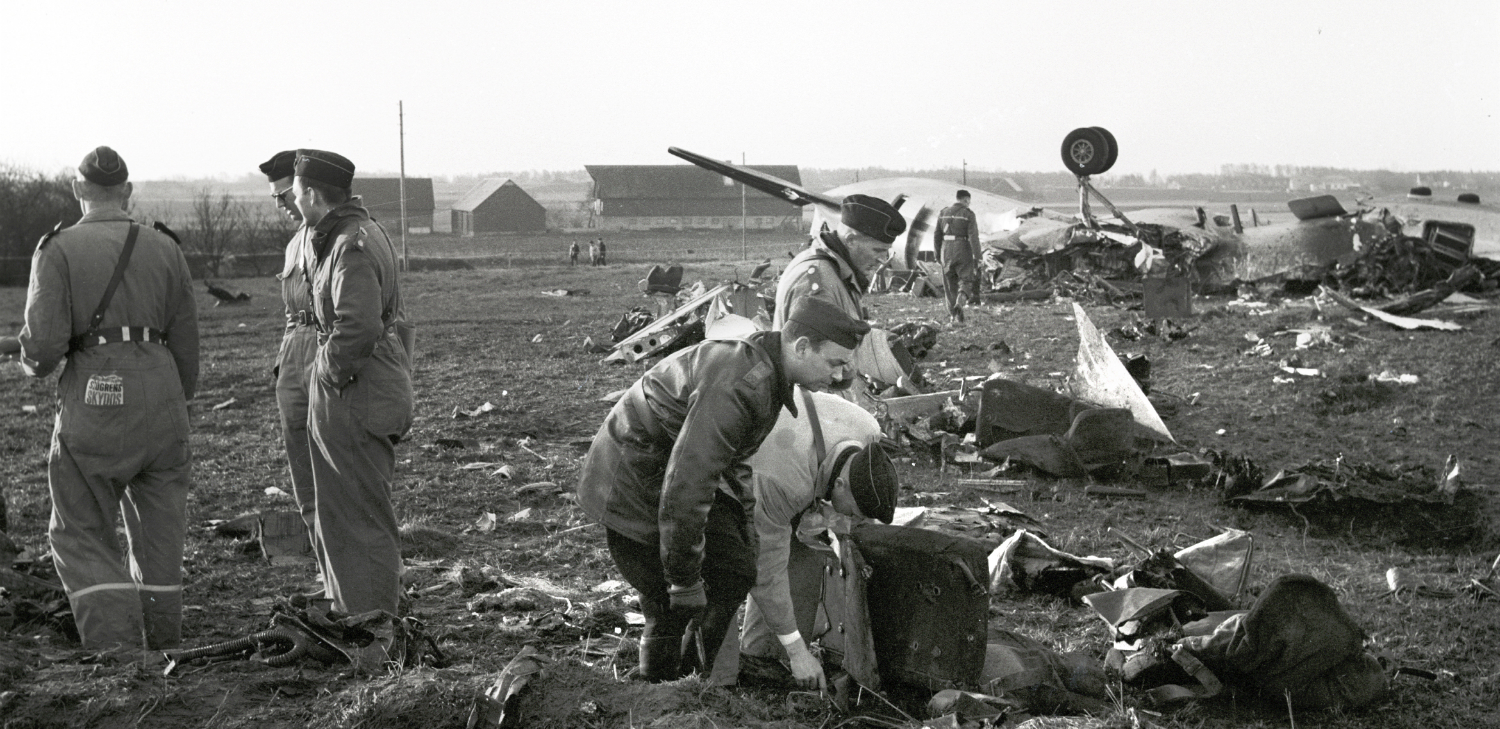
The day after the crash. The passengers' belongings are gathered.

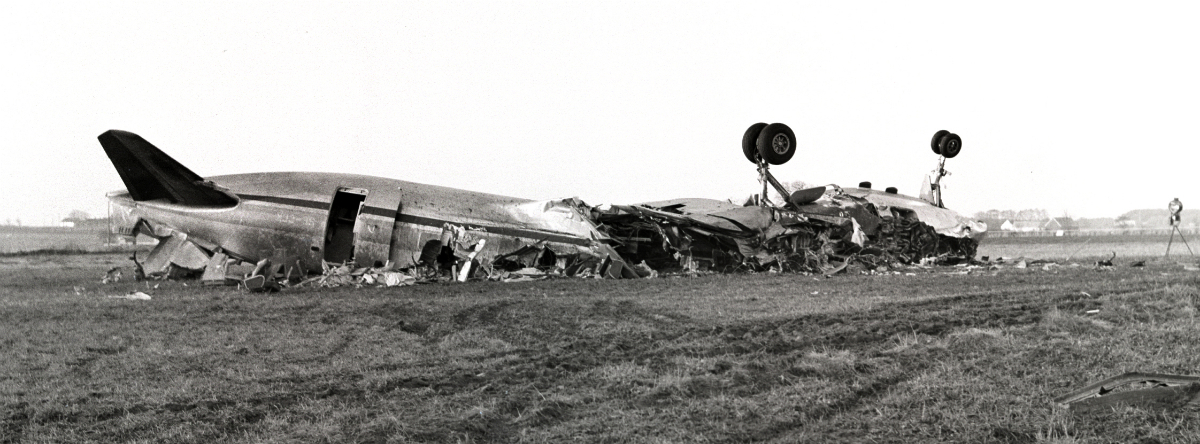
The day after the crash. Picture of the plane.

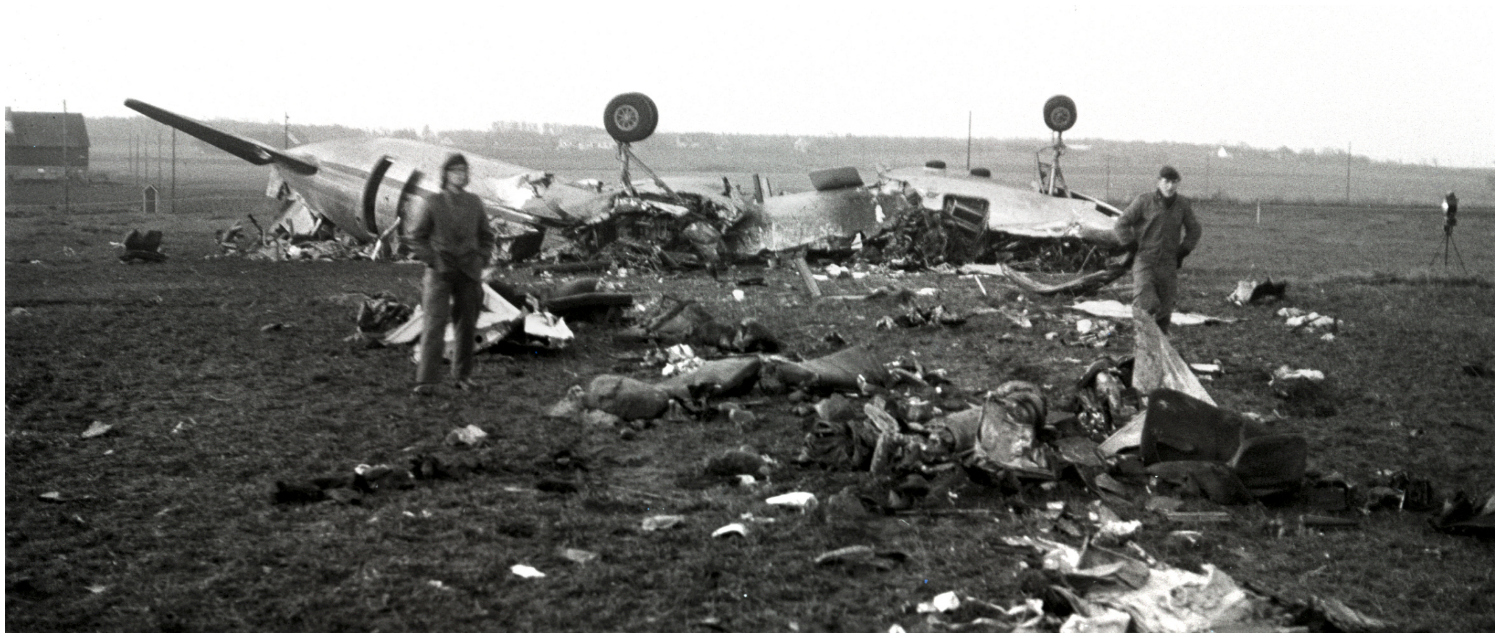
The day after the crash. The passengers' belongings are gathered.

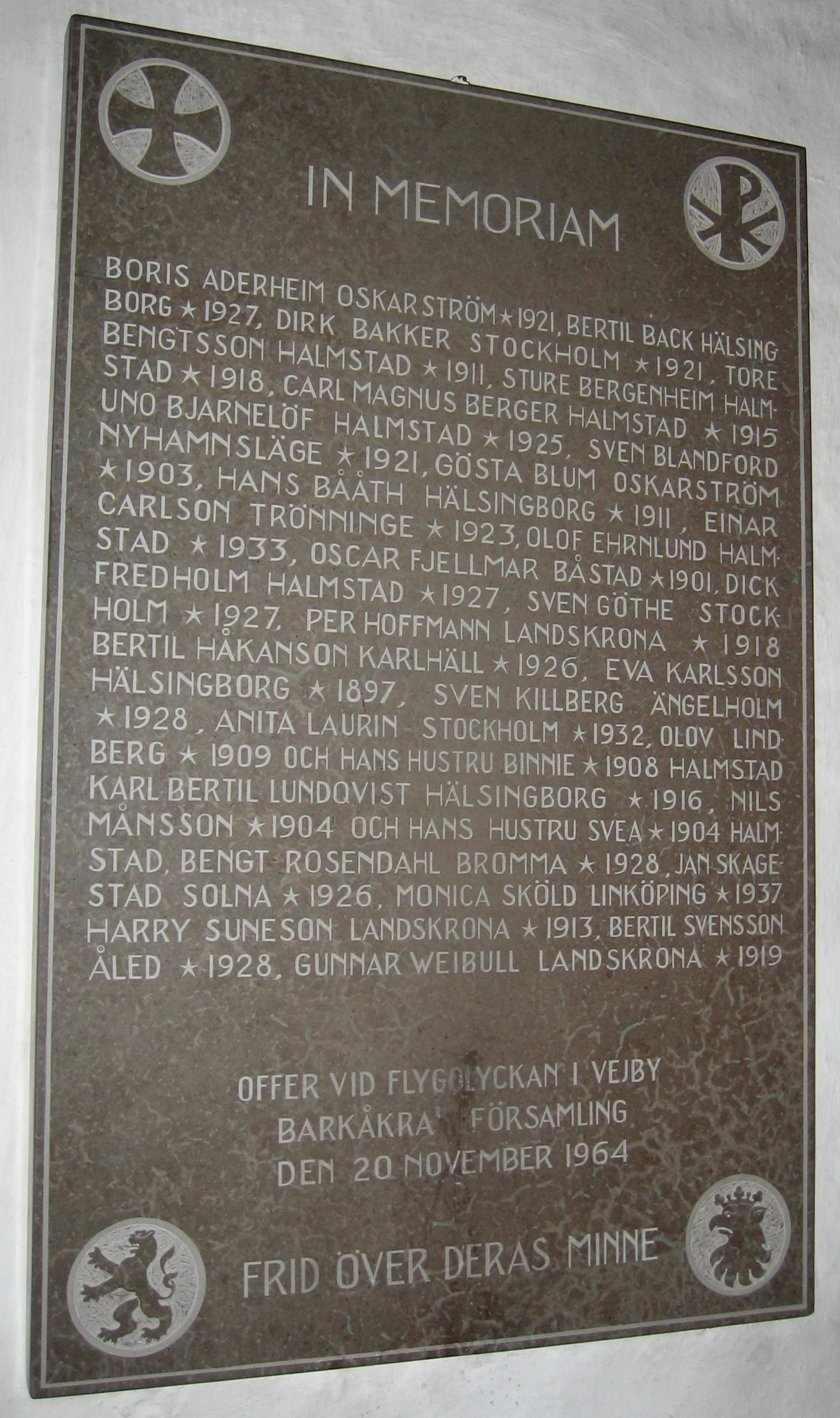
Memorial

== Bibliography ==
- Sanz, Michael (2006). Linjeflyg: ett folkflyg från start till landning (in Swedish) (2nd ed.). Stockholm: Allt om hobby. ISBN 91-7243-038-9. SELIBR 10154585.
