= Sundsvallsflyg =

Swedish regional airline, 2001–2016

IATA	ICAO	Call sign
DC	GAO	Golden
- Founded: 2001
- Ceased operations: 2016
- Hubs: Sundsvall-Härnösand Airport
- Fleet size: 1
- Destinations: 3
- Parent company: Sverigeflyg
- Headquarters: Sundsvall, Sweden
- Website: sundsvallsflyg.se

Sundsvallsflyg was a small regional airline based in Sundsvall, Sweden. Their own staff worked partly as ground personnel and as cabin crew on the aircraft, which were operated by Braathens Regional. Sundsvallflyg was part of the now dissolved brand Sverigeflyg which incorporated several small domestic airlines.

In 2016, the Sundsvallsflyg brand was, together with several other domestic airline brands, merged into the new BRA Braathens Regional Airlines.

== Destinations ==
Sundsvallsflyg operated the following destinations as of February 2015:

- Stockholm - Stockholm-Bromma Airport
- Sundsvall - Sundsvall-Härnösand Airport base
- Visby - Visby Airport seasonal

== Fleet ==
The Sundsvallsflyg fleet consisted of the following aircraft as of February 2015:

- 1 Saab 2000 (operated by Braathens Regional)
