= Braathen =

Braathen is a surname. Notable people with the surname include:

- Barbara Braathen, American art dealer, gallerist and curator
- Helga Braathen (1953–1982), Norwegian artistic gymnast
- Kjerstin Braathen (born 1970), Norwegian business executive
- Lucas Pinheiro Braathen (born 2000), Norwegian-Brazilian skier
- Ludvig G. Braathen (1891–1976), Norwegian entrepreneur

== See also ==
- Braathens (disambiguation), articles related to surname Braathen
