= Flight 267 =

Flight 267 may refer to:

- Linjeflyg Flight 267, crashed on 20 November 1964
- Trigana Air Flight 267, crashed on 16 August 2015
