= Braathens International Airways =

Swedish airline

IATA	ICAO	Call sign
TT	BIX	SUN TRIP
- Founded: 2022
- Commenced operations: 2023
- Ceased operations: September 2025
- Fleet size: 5
- Parent company: Braganza AB
- Headquarters: Stockholm Bromma Airport, Stockholm, Sweden

Braathens International Airways AB was a Swedish airline that operated flights for its sister-company Braathens Regional Airlines under its own air operator's certificate. The airline primarily provided jet charter services for package holiday providers. In September 2025, the airline filed for bankruptcy.

== History ==
Braathens International Airways was founded in 2022 to operate jet charter services between Scandinavia and southern Europe. In June 2022, it signed a three-year contract with tour operator Ving to provide summer charter flights from regional Scandinavian airports, with the first flights commencing in April 2023 to destinations such as Tenerife from Stockholm Arlanda and Billund. In February 2023, BIX secured a three-year contract valued at SEK 1.6 billion with Apollo, for year-round charter flights from Stockholm Arlanda and Gothenburg Landvetter starting in October 2023.

== Destinations ==
Braathens International Airways primarily operated charter flights to southern Europe for tour operators, including Ving, TUI, and Apollo, on behalf of sister company Braathens Regional Airlines. The airline's fleet included Airbus A319 and A320 aircraft. Braathens International also provided domestic services for BRA within Sweden, operating jet services on busy routes during peak times, as well as maintaining a single scheduled route from Stockholm Bromma Airport to Malmö Airport. The airline operated under its own Air Operator Certificate (AOC) with the ICAO code BIX.

The following destinations were operated or announced by Braathens International Airlines for its Summer 2024 charter program, primarily for tour operators including Nordic Leisure Travel Group (Ving, Spies & Tjäreborg), and Apollo Resor:

Country	City	Airport
Denmark	Aalborg	Aalborg Airport
Denmark	Billund	Billund Airport
Denmark	Copenhagen	Copenhagen Airport
Denmark	Aarhus	Aarhus Airport
Finland	Helsinki	Helsinki Airport
Finland	Turku	Turku Airport
Finland	Oulu	Oulu Airport
Finland	Tampere	Tampere Airport
Norway	Ålesund	Ålesund Airport, Vigra
Norway	Trondheim	Trondheim Airport, Værnes
Norway	Bergen	Bergen Airport, Flesland
Norway	Kristiansand	Kristiansand Airport, Kjevik
Norway	Stavanger	Stavanger Airport, Sola
Sweden	Åre Östersund	Åre Östersund Airport
Sweden	Gothenburg	Gothenburg Landvetter Airport
Sweden	Jönköping	Jönköping Airport
Sweden	Luleå	Luleå Airport
Sweden	Malmö	Malmö Airport
Sweden	Norrköping	Norrköping Airport
Sweden	Stockholm	Stockholm Arlanda Airport
Sweden	Visby	Visby Airport
Croatia	Split	Split Airport
Croatia	Dubrovnik	Dubrovnik Airport
Croatia	Pula	Pula Airport
Cyprus	Larnaca	Larnaca International Airport
Cyprus	Paphos	Paphos International Airport
Greece	Preveza	Aktion National Airport
Greece	Rhodes	Rhodes International Airport
Greece	Mytilini	Mytilene International Airport
Greece	Kavala	Kavala International Airport
Greece	Limnos	Lemnos International Airport
Greece	Sitia	Sitia Public Airport
Greece	Chania	Chania International Airport
Greece	Heraklion	Heraklion International Airport
Greece	Ioannina	Ioannina National Airport
Greece	Karpathos	Karpathos Island National Airport
Greece	Kos	Kos Island International Airport
Greece	Kalamata	Kalamata International Airport
Egypt	Hurghada	Hurghada International Airport
Egypt	Sharm El-Sheikh	Sharm El Sheikh International Airport
Portugal	Funchal	Madeira Airport
Portugal	Lisbon	Lisbon Airport
Spain	Gran Canaria	Gran Canaria Airport
Spain	Tenerife	Tenerife South Airport
Spain	Fuerteventura	Fuerteventura Airport
Spain	Palma de Mallorca	Palma de Mallorca Airport
Spain	Las Palmas	Gran Canaria Airport
Spain	Ibiza	Ibiza Airport
Spain	Alicante	Alicante–Elche Airport
Spain	Malaga	Malaga Airport
Tunisia	Enfidha	Enfidha-Hammamet International Airport
Tunisia	Monastir	Monastir Habib Bourguiba International Airport
Turkey	Antalya	Antalya Airport
Turkey	Dalaman	Dalaman Airport
Turkey	Istanbul	Istanbul Airport

== Fleet ==
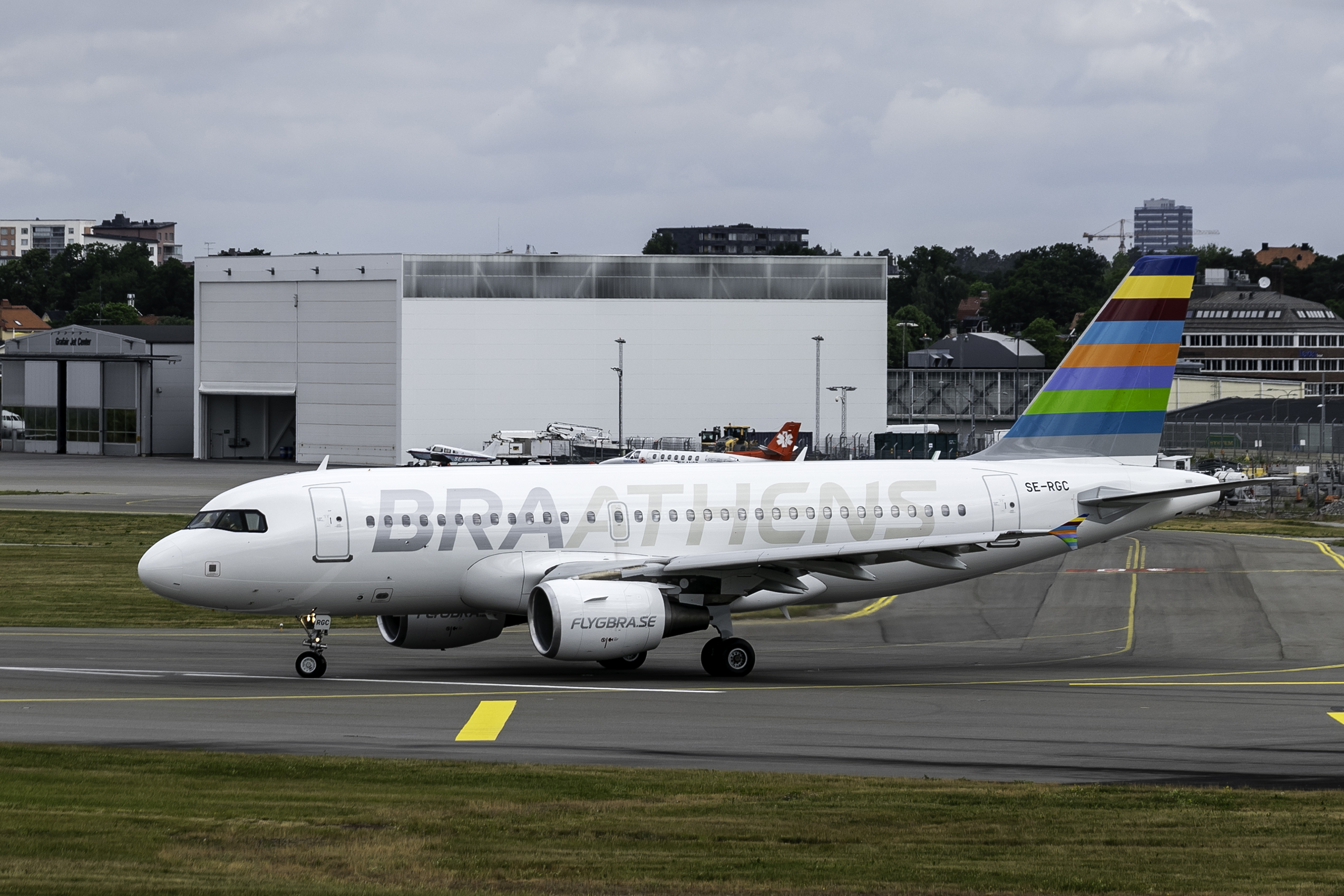
Braathens International Airways Airbus A319-100

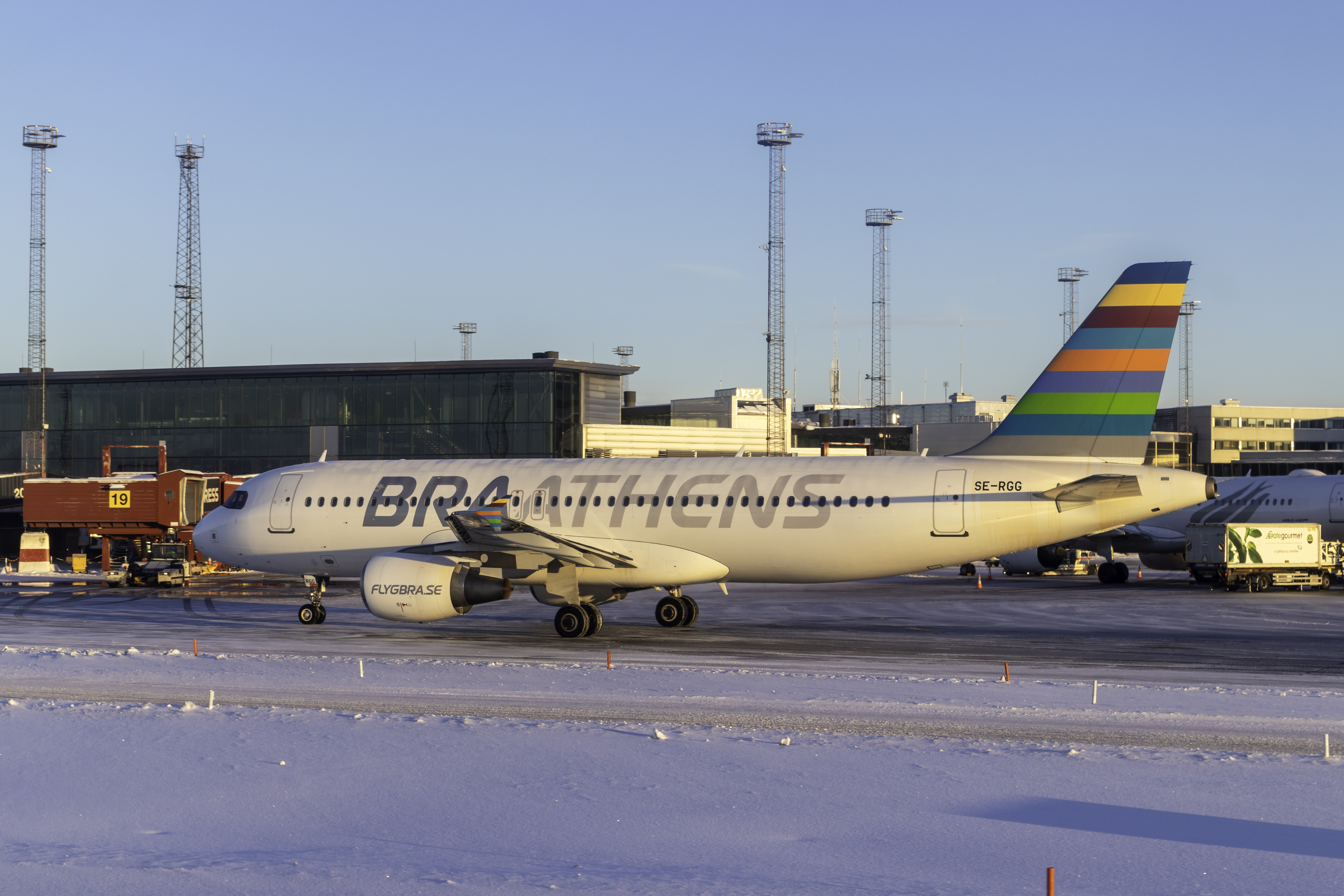
Braathens International Airways Airbus A320-200

=== Current fleet ===
As of August 2025, Braathens International Airways operated the following aircraft:

Braathens International Airways fleet
Aircraft	In service	Orders	Passengers
Airbus A319-100	2	—	144
Airbus A320-200	3	—	180
Total	5	—	

=== Fleet development ===
In January 2023, the airline started operations with one Airbus A319 aircraft, originally delivered to EasyJet in 2004. The company placed orders for five Airbus A319 aircraft in 2022, intended for the charter market with tour operator Ving as lead customer for summer 2023. In October 2023, Braathens International Airways took delivery of its first Airbus A320-200 ahead of planned charter flights for Nordic tour operator Apollo. The 16.1-year-old aircraft was leased from DAE Capital.
