= Hultsfred Airport =

Airport in Hultsfred Municipality, Sweden

Hultsfred-Vimmerby Airport
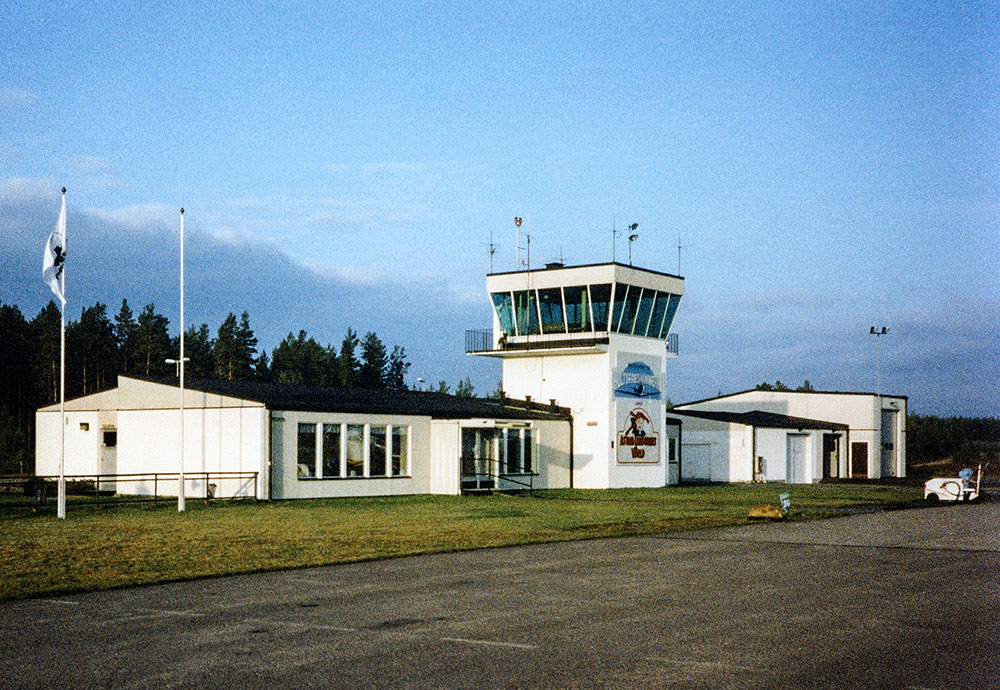
- Hultsfred-Vimmerby Airport circa 1994
- IATA: HLF; ICAO: ESSF

Summary
- Airport type: Public
- Owner: Hultsfred Airport AB, Box 146, S-598 22 Vimmerby.
- Serves: Hultsfred,
- Location: 2 Nautical Miles/3.5 kilometers North, Northwest of Hultsfred
- Elevation AMSL: 111.55 m / 366 ft
- Coordinates: 57°31′17.01″N 15°50′1.46″E
- Website: http://www.hultsfredairport.se/
- Interactive map of Hultsfred-Vimmerby Airport

Runways
Direction	Length		Surface
Direction	m	ft	Surface
12/30	1,945	6,381.2	Concrete (131.2 ft or 40.0 m wide)

Hultsfred Airport is a regional airport in Hultsfred Municipality, Sweden, about 5 km north of the town of Hultsfred. Currently there is no scheduled traffic to/from the airport. It is however used by a local aviation club. A scheduled line to Stockholm existed for many years but was closed down in 2006.

== See also ==
- List of the largest airports in the Nordic countries
