= Braathens Regional Airlines =

Swedish airline

BRA Sverige AB
- Trade name: BRA Braathens Regional Airlines
- Type: Aktiebolag
- Industry: Aviation
- Predecessor: Sverigeflyg; Malmö Aviation
- Founded: 2016
- Headquarters: Bromma Airport, Stockholm
- Area served: Sweden, Europe
- Key people: Ulrika Matsgård, CEO
- Owner: Braganza AB (81%); AMF Tjänstepension AB (19%)
- Number of employees: 400
- Subsidiaries: Braathens Regional Airways; Braathens International Airways
- Website: flygbra.se

BRA Sverige AB, trading as Braathens Regional Airlines, often shortended to BRA (Swedish for "Good"), is a Swedish virtual airline headquartered in Stockholm, Sweden, which operates wet lease flights, primarily for Scandinavian Airlines. Between 2016 and 2024, BRA operated its own route network with its main operational base at Stockholm Bromma Airport.

Established in 2016, the airline was created to unify the brands of Malmö Aviation and Sverigeflyg under a single identity for the Swedish domestic market. BRA does not hold an Air Operator's Certificate (AOC) or operate its own aircraft; instead, it charters aircraft and crews from its sister companies, Braathens Regional Airways and Braathens International Airways.

In September 2024, Braathens Regional Airlines announced that it would discontinue its regular flight services and cease operations at Bromma Airport, and move to operating wet lease flights for Scandinavian Airlines from Stockholm Arlanda Airport.

== History ==
=== Predecessors and formation ===
In 2007, Braganza formed Braathens Aviation as a holding company for its aviation ventures in Sweden, including Malmö Aviation. By 2012, Braganza acquired Golden Air, a regional airline in Sweden, which was subsequently rebranded as Braathens Regional Airlines in 2013. The consolidation continued with Braganza's acquisition of approximately 80% of Sverigeflyg in 2011. Full ownership was achieved by 2013, integrating Sverigeflyg's routes into the Braathens network.

In February 2016, Braathens Regional Airlines was officially established following the merger of Malmö Aviation and Sverigeflyg.

=== COVID-19 pandemic ===
From early April 2020 until late May 2020, BRA suspended all flights in response to a sharp decrease in demand due to the COVID-19 pandemic, and the Swedish Government and Public Health Agency's recommendation that people not travel around the country. BRA filed in court for a debt restructuring on 6 April 2020. BRA relaunched limited charter operations on October 1, 2020, and then resumed scheduled domestic operations later in the final quarter of 2020.

=== Investment and restructuring ===
On October 15, 2021, Swedish pension fund AMF announced a SEK 200 million investment in Braathens Regional Airlines, securing a 19% stake in the company.

Between 2022 and 2024, BRA undertook significant restructuring efforts to address financial and operational challenges. In October 2023, BRA applied for creditor protection in Sweden for seven of its thirteen affiliated companies. The restructuring plan, approved by creditors and the Solna District Court in February 2024, included a SEK 114 million investment from existing shareholders. During this period, BRA focused on three main areas: domestic flights within Sweden, charter services, and ACMI (Aircraft, Crew, Maintenance, and Insurance) agreements. The airline also obtained a second Air Operator Certificate (AOC) for the newly formed Braathens International Airways, which focuses on charter flights.

=== Move to Arlanda Airport and shift to contract flights ===
Braathens Regional Airlines announced in September 2024 that it would discontinue its regular flight services and shift its operations to wet-lease flights under a new seven-year contract with SAS, valued at 6 billion kronor. As part of this transition, the airline ceased operations at Bromma Airport and moved its services to Stockholm Arlanda Airport. BRA stated that this decision was in response to a decline in domestic air travel since the COVID-19 pandemic. BRA planned to lay off approximately 70 employees in ground services and administrative roles while simultaneously recruiting around 100 new pilots and cabin crew to support its new operations at Arlanda. The Stockholm Chamber of Commerce indicated that BRA's departure could result in the loss of approximately 90% of Bromma's air traffic, raising concerns about the Bromma Airport's potential closure.

Braathens marked its final flight, from Visby Airport to Stockholm Bromma, flight TF427, with a heart-shaped flight path over western Stockholm before landing on 30 December 2024. Following this flight, the ATR 72-600 aircraft conducted a ferry flight to be relocated to Stockholm Arlanda Airport.

Starting in January 2025, the Braathens Regional fleet of 14 aircraft was repainted in SAS livery.

== Former destinations ==
In December 2024, Braathens Regional Airlines discontinued all its scheduled routes as part of the transition announced in September 2024. The airline ceased operations at Bromma Airport and shifted to providing wet lease services for Scandinavian Airlines from Stockholm Arlanda.

Previously, BRA had operated routes from its hub at Bromma including to Aarhus in Denmark, Helsinki in Finland, and a wide range of destinations in Sweden, including Gothenburg, Malmö, Umeå, Kalmar, Ronneby, and seasonal routes such as Sälen and Norrköping. The airline also had codeshare agreements with Finnair and Widerøe, established as of 2020.

== Fleet ==
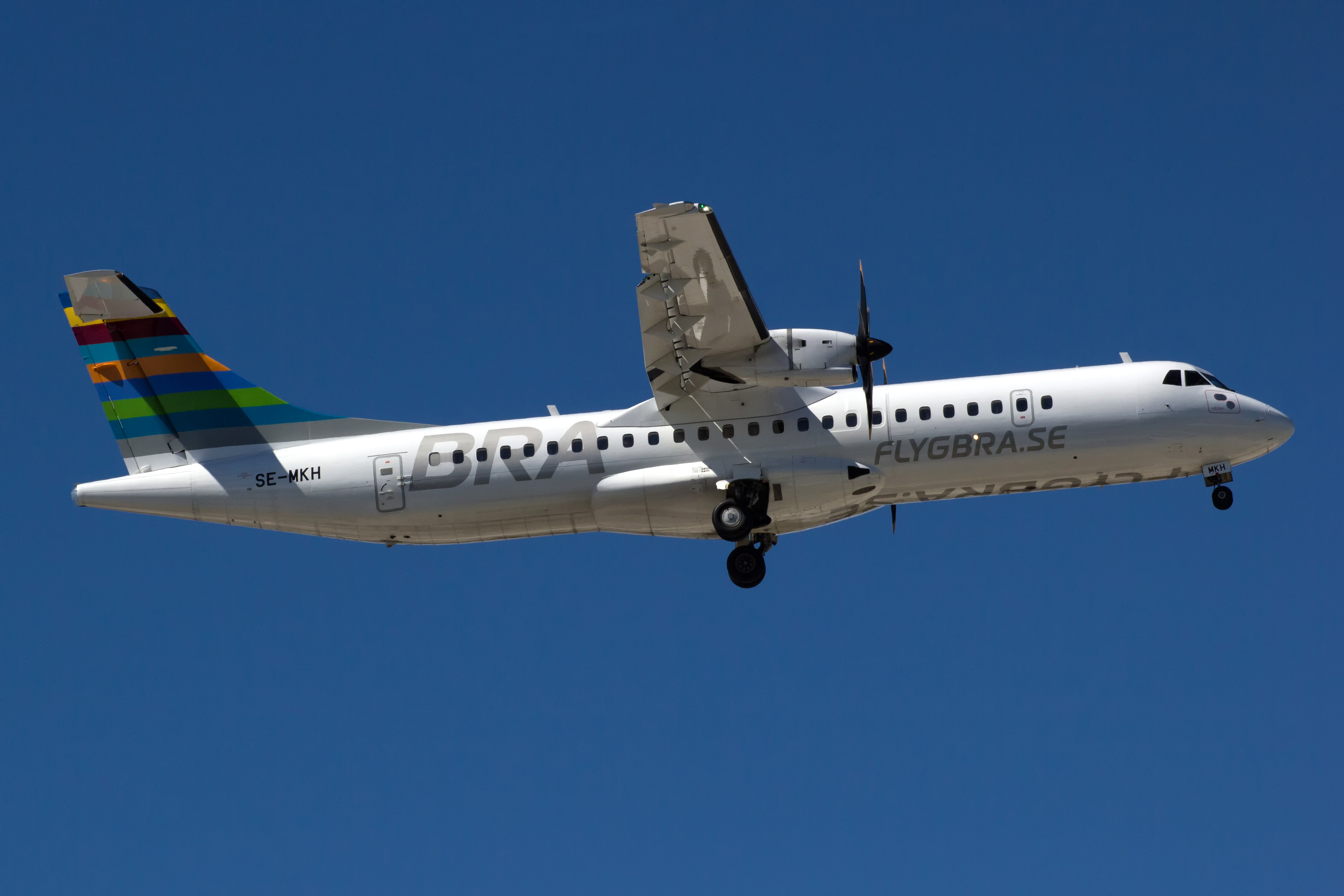
BRA ATR 72-600 operated by Braathens Regional Airways

As of January 2026, the fleet operated for BRA Braathens Regional Airlines consists of the following aircraft:

BRA Braathens Regional Airlines fleet
Aircraft	In service	Orders	Passengers	Notes
ATR 72-600	17	—	72	Operated by Braathens Regional Airways.
Total	17	—		

== See also ==
- Transport in Sweden
