= Braathens Regional Airways =

Regional airline of Sweden

IATA	ICAO	Call sign
TF	BRX	BRAATHENS
- Founded: 1976; 50 years ago (as Golden Air)
- AOC #: SE.AOC.0006
- Hubs: Stockholm Arlanda Airport
- Frequent-flyer program: BRA VÄNNER
- Fleet size: 19
- Destinations: see Braathens Regional Airlines
- Parent company: Braganza AB
- Headquarters: Stockholm Bromma Airport, Stockholm, Sweden
- Website: www.flygbra.se

Braathens Regional Airways AB is a Swedish airline that operates ACMI (Aircraft, Crew, Maintenance, and Insurance) services for its sister company, Braathens Regional Airlines. It flies to various domestic destinations within Sweden and also provides ad hoc charter services. The airline is headquartered at Stockholm Bromma Airport and was previously known as Golden Air and Braathens Regional.

== History ==
The airline was originally registered as Golden Air Flyg AB in September 1976 and operated air taxi and charter services. It underwent several changes until being restructured under the current ownership in August 1993. It started operations on 15 August 1993. It was long wholly owned by shipping company Erik Thun and had 56 employees (at March 2007).

In 2012, Golden Air was acquired by Braathens Aviation and the main Trollhättan - Bromma route was taken over by Sverigeflyg. On 1 January 2013, Golden Air changed its name to Braathens Regional while retaining the brand name for its Bromma route.

In March 2016, Braathens Regional changed its name to Braathens Regional Airways and together with Braathens Regional Aviation started operating all flights for the virtual airline BRA Braathens Regional Airlines uniting the previously separated brands of Malmö Aviation and Sverigeflyg.

Braathens Regional Airways has one maintenance base at Ängelholm–Helsingborg Airport for the ATR 72 and one base at Umeå Airport for the SAAB 2000.

== Destinations ==
The airline does not have any destinations of its own but instead serves the operations of its sister company Braathens Regional Airlines.

== Fleet ==
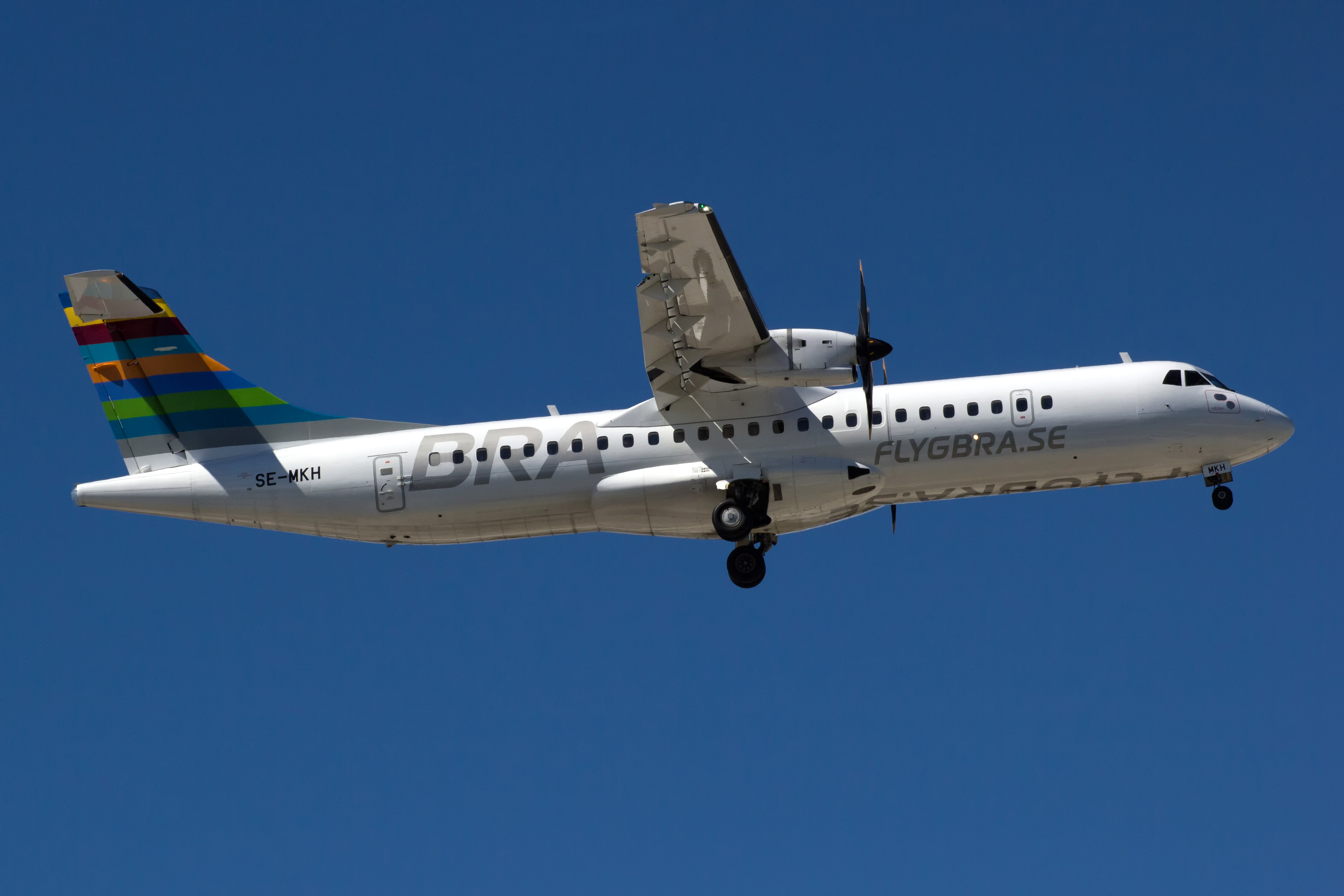
Braathens Regional Airways ATR 72-600

As of August 2025, Braathens Regional Airways operates the following aircraft:

Braathens Regional Airways fleet
Aircraft	In service	Orders	Passengers	Notes
Airbus A319-100	2	—	144	
ATR 72-600	15	—	72	
Total	17	—		

== See also ==
- Airlines
- Transport in Sweden
