= Braathens Regional Aviation =

Swedish airline based in Malmö

| IATA | ICAO | Call sign |
|---|---|---|
| TF | SCW | SCANWING |
- Founded: 1981
- Commenced operations: 1981
- Ceased operations: 2020
- Hubs: Stockholm Bromma Airport
- Fleet size: 3
- Destinations: see Braathens Regional Airlines
- Parent company: Braganza
- Headquarters: Malmö, Sweden
- Key people: Per G. Braathen (Owner); Knut A. Solberg (CEO)
- Website: flygbra.se

Braathens Regional Aviation, was a Swedish airline based in Malmö. From 2016 it provided wet-leasing services in partnership with its sister airline Braathens Regional Airways for Braathens Regional Airlines.

Founded in 1981 as Malmö Aviation it operated domestic routes in Sweden from its hub at Stockholm Bromma Airport. In February 2016, the airline merged with Sverigeflyg to create Braathens Regional Airlines. As part of this merger, the airline changed its name to Braathens Regional Aviation and ceased operating its own flight network.

In 2020, due to the COVID-19 pandemic, the airline ceased all operations. Its similarly named sister companies Braathens Regional Airlines and Braathens Regional Airways continue to operate.

== History ==
=== Foundation and early years ===
The company was established in 1981, operating as a flight training school and air charter company. In the late 1980s it began operating cargo services on behalf of TNT with BAe 146-200QT jet aircraft; as well as the turboprop Fokker F27 Friendship and its derivatives, the Fairchild F-27 and Fairchild Hiller FH-227.

The company was sold to City Air Scandinavia on 11 February 1992. A new company Malmö Aviation Schedule was formed on 16 April 1993 under the ownership of Wiklund Inter Trade. Braathens of Norway acquired full control in August 1998 and in early 1999 integrated Braathens Sweden (formerly Transwede) into Malmö Aviation. In December 2001 it became an independent airline owned by Braganza AS/Bramora. This was the result of the Scandinavian Airlines (SAS) acquisition of Braathens in which Malmö Aviation, for legal reasons, was not included. It is now wholly owned by Braathens Aviation.

=== Development in the 2000s and closure ===
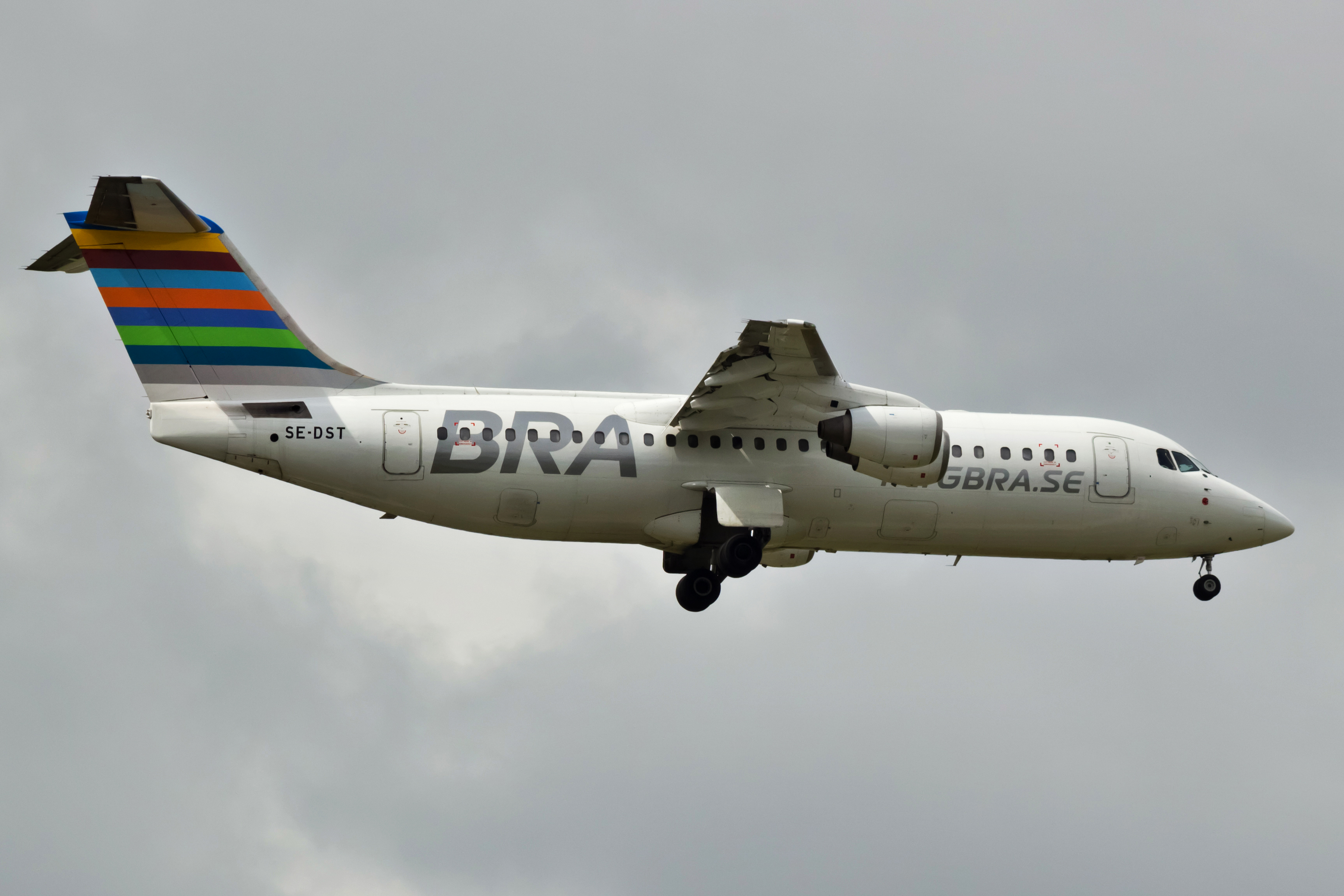
A Braathens Regional Airlines Avro RJ100 operated by Braathens Regional Aviation in 2016.

In September 2014, Malmö Aviation stated that it would no longer be the Bombardier CS100's launch customer as previously planned. This role was taken over by Swiss Global Air Lines.

In March 2016, the operational part of Malmö Aviation was merged into Braathens Regional Airlines together with Sverigeflyg and the name was changed to Braathens Regional Aviation. In March 2017, Braathens Regional Aviation announced the postponement all of its orders for the Airbus A220, then known as Bombardier C-Series, indefinitely after a new Swedish ticket tax will be introduced which is expected to reduce passenger numbers. In May 2019, Braathens announced the cancellation of their A220-order which consisted of five -100 and five -300 series aircraft.

In 2020, due to the COVID-19 pandemic, the airline ceased all operations. Braathens Regional Airlines and Braathens Regional Airways, also owned by Braganza continue to operate as of 2024.

== Destinations ==
Braathens Regional Aviation did not operate flights under its own name. Instead the aircraft were used to operate flights for sister airline Braathens Regional Airlines.

== Fleet ==
As of March 2020, the Braathens Regional Aviation fleet consisted of the following aircraft, which were all operated for Braathens Regional Airlines:

Braathens Regional Aviation fleet
| Aircraft | In fleet | Orders | Passengers | Notes |
|---|---|---|---|---|
| Embraer 190 | 3 | 2 | 106 | operated for Braathens Regional Airlines wet-leased from German Regional Airlines and returned in April 2020 |
| Total | 3 | 2 | | |

During its operation, the airline utilised a variety of aircraft, including models from the BAe 146 series, Avro RJ series, and a Saab 2000.

== See also ==
- Airlines
- Transport in Sweden
