= Ängelholm–Helsingborg Airport =

Ängelholm–Helsingborg Airport Ängelholm–Helsingborg flygplats
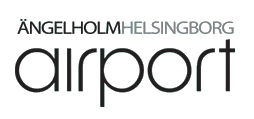

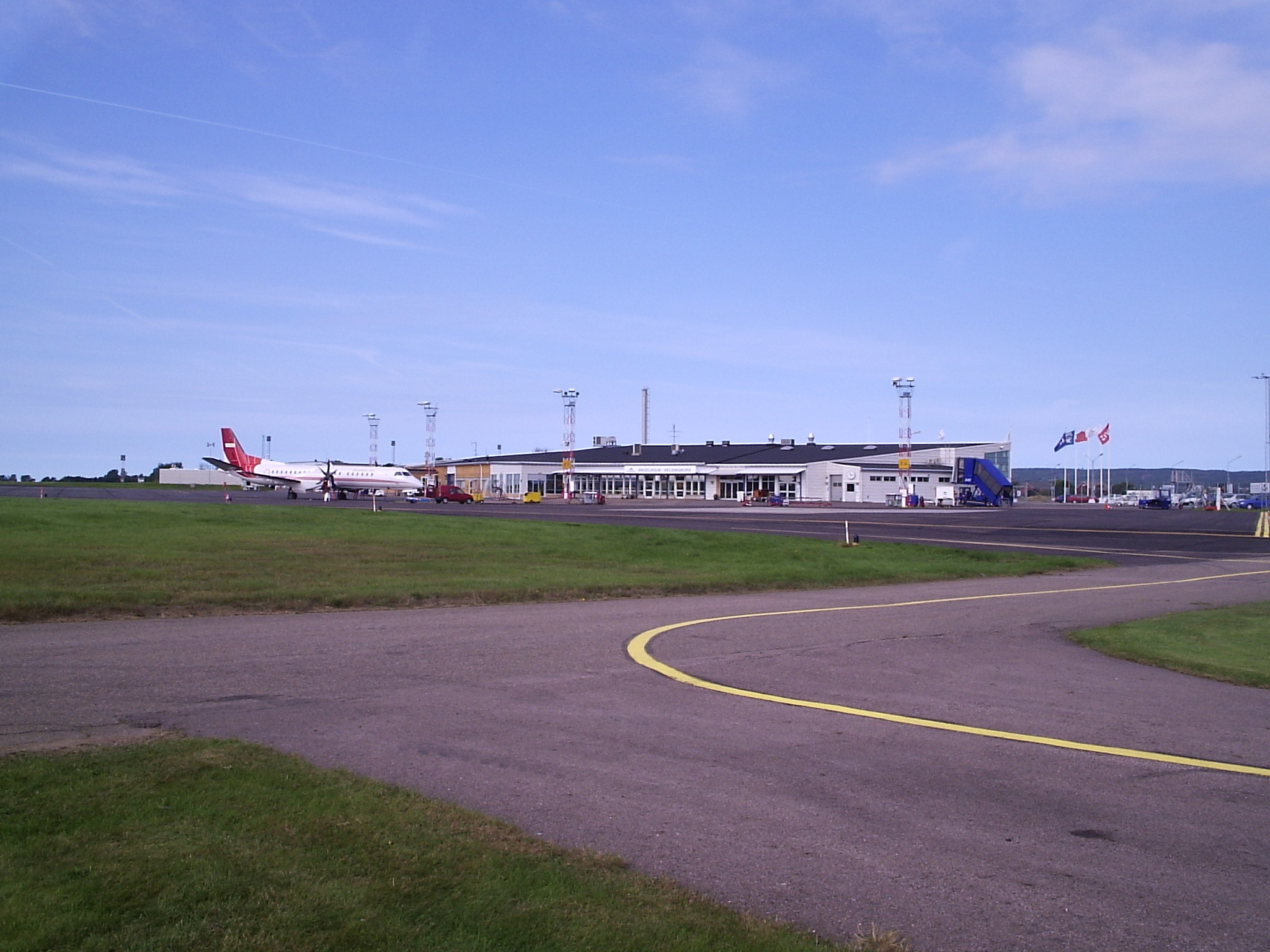
- IATA: AGH; ICAO: ESTA

Summary
- Airport type: Public
- Owner: Peab
- Operator: Ängelholms Flygplats AB
- Serves: Northwestern Skåne
- Elevation AMSL: 68 ft / 21 m
- Coordinates: 56°17′46″N 012°50′50″E
- Website: angelholmhelsingborgairport.se

Map
- Location within Skåne County AGH (Sweden)

Runways
Direction	Length		Surface
Direction	ft	m	Surface
14/32	6,381	1,945	Asphalt

Statistics (2019)
- Passengers total: 386,519
- Aircraft movements: 5,640
- Statistics: Swedish Transport Agency

Ängelholm–Helsingborg Airport (IATA: AGH, ICAO: ESTA) is an airport in Sweden, located about 34 km from Helsingborg and 7 km from Ängelholm.

== History ==
A military airforce base was opened here in 1945. In 1960, civilian passenger flights started from this airport. In 2002, the airforce left the airport, and it became a civilian only airport. The route to Stockholm has always had the largest number of passengers.

On 28 May 2020, the airport owner stated the airport would close by the end of 2020 unless government support was available. However as of 2025, the airport remains operational.

== Airlines and destinations ==
The following airlines operate regular scheduled flights to and from Ängelholm–Helsingborg Airport:

Airlines	Destinations
Scandinavian Airlines	Stockholm–Arlanda; Seasonal: Sälen–Trysil

== Statistics ==
Ängelholm–Helsingborg Airport is southern Sweden's (Skåne) second largest airport and the 8th largest airport in the whole country. The airport had 202'485 passengers in 2024, much lower than pre-COVID.

Traffic by calendar year
Year	Passenger volume	Change	Domestic	Change	International	Change
2019	386,519	▼4.1%	381,899	▼4.4%	4,620	▲25.2%
2018	403,103		399,410		3,690	

== See also ==
- Linjeflyg flight 277
- List of the largest airports in the Nordic countries
