= Malmö Airport =

Airport in Sweden

Malmö Airport Malmö flygplats

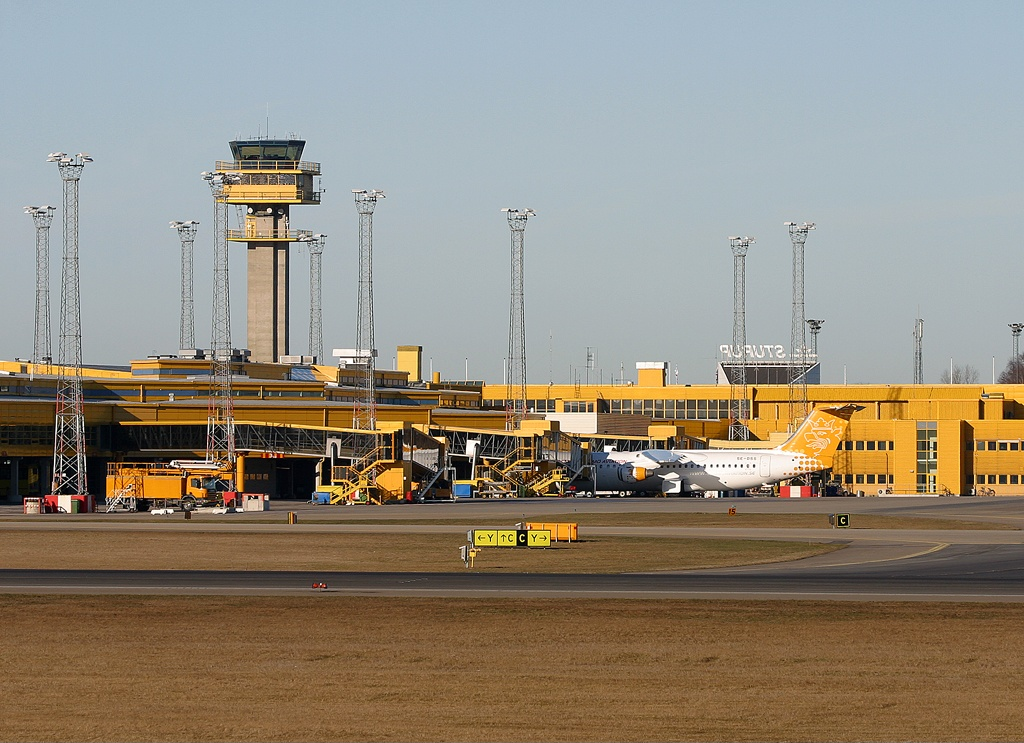
- IATA: MMX; ICAO: ESMS

Summary
- Airport type: Public
- Operator: Swedavia
- Serves: Malmö & Scania (Sweden); Copenhagen & Capital Region (Denmark)
- Location: Svedala Municipality, Skåne County, Sweden
- Opened: 3 December 1972; 53 years ago
- Elevation AMSL: 72 m (236 ft)
- Coordinates: 55°31′48″N 013°22′17″E
- Website: www.swedavia.com/malmo

Map
- Location within Skåne MMX/ESMS (Sweden)

Runways
Direction	Length		Surface
Direction	m	ft	Surface
11/29	800	2,624	Asphalt
17/35	2,800	9,186	Asphalt

Statistics (2019)
- Passengers: 1.975.479 (▼8%)
- Aircraft Movements: 18.676 (▼7%)

Malmö Airport (IATA: MMX, ICAO: ESMS) is an international airport located in Scania, Sweden, approximately 28 kilometres (17 mi) east of Malmö. It is Sweden's fifth-busiest airport, with just over 905,000 passengers in 2024 - 53% domestic and 47% international.

The airport opened in 1972 to replace Bulltofta Airport, and was known until 2007 as Malmö-Sturup Airport (Swedish: Malmö-Sturups flygplats). It is owned and operated by Swedavia, Sweden's state-owned airport company, and features one passenger terminal, two cargo terminals, and a single 2,800-metre runway.

Located in Svedala Municipality, Malmö Airport is about 55 kilometres (34 mi) from central Copenhagen, and 47 kilometres (29 mi) from Copenhagen Airport via the Öresund Bridge. Malmö itself is roughly the same distance by road from Copenhagen Airport as from Malmö Airport.

== History ==
=== Early years ===
Completed in 1972, then at a cost of around SEK130 million, almost twice as much as initially forecast, Sturup Airport replaced the aging Bulltofta Airport, which had served the region since 1923. Plans to build a new airport were drafted in the early 1960s. Expansion was impossible, due to Bulltofta's close proximity to the now booming city and nearby communities complained about noise pollution from the newly introduced jet aircraft.

Construction began in 1970, and the airport was inaugurated two years later on 3 December 1972. At the same time Bulltofta Airport closed. However, Malmö ATC (Air Traffic Control) remained at the old Bulltofta site until 1983 when it also moved to Malmö Airport.

According to the Official Airline Guide (OAG), three airlines were serving the airport in the fall of 1996 including KLM Cityhopper with nonstop Fokker 50 turboprop flights to Amsterdam (AMS), Malmo Aviation with nonstop British Aerospace BAe 146 jet flights to London City Airport (LCY) as well as Stockholm Bromma Airport (BMA), and Scandinavian Airlines System (SAS) with nonstop McDonnell Douglas MD-80 and MD-87 jet flights to Stockholm Arlanda Airport (ARN).

=== Development since the 2000s ===
Around 2005–2008 several low-cost airlines hoped to attract both Danish and Swedish passengers to Sturup Airport in competition with Copenhagen Airport. Malmö airport, due to its lower landing fees, is seen by some low-cost airlines as a less expensive way of accessing the Copenhagen area. The airport caters to low-cost carriers such as Wizz Air.

During 2008 Danish Sterling Airlines was operating service from Malmö Airport to London Gatwick Airport (LGW), Alicante, Barcelona, Nice and Florence. However, other low-cost carriers such as easyJet use Copenhagen Airport. Norwegian Air Shuttle uses Malmö Airport for a few flights a day to and from Stockholm Arlanda Airport while the majority of flights to the region go to Copenhagen Airport. In 2014, Ryanair moved their operations to Copenhagen Airport as well.

The Malmö Airport Masterplan from 2018 describes how the airport will develop in the years to come, e.g. by extending the hall for arriving luggage and with new traffic flows to and from the airport. The works are projected in order to allow for a future second passenger terminal, as well as a second, parallel, runway northwest of the present one.

== Facilities ==
Malmö Airport features one passenger and two cargo terminals as well as 20 aircraft stands.

== Airlines and destinations ==
The following airlines operate regular scheduled and charter flights to and from Malmö:

Airlines	Destinations
Ryanair	London–Stansted, Warsaw–Modlin, Zagreb
Scandinavian Airlines	Stockholm–Arlanda
Skåne Aviation	Stockholm–Bromma
Sunclass Airlines	Seasonal charter: Antalya, Chania, Gran Canaria, Heraklion, Larnaca, Palma de Mallorca, Rhodes, Tenerife–South
Trade Air	Seasonal charter: Pristina
Wizz Air	Belgrade, Bucharest–Otopeni, Cluj-Napoca,, Iași, Podgorica, Pristina (begins 15 December 2026), Skopje, Tirana, Tuzla

== Statistics ==
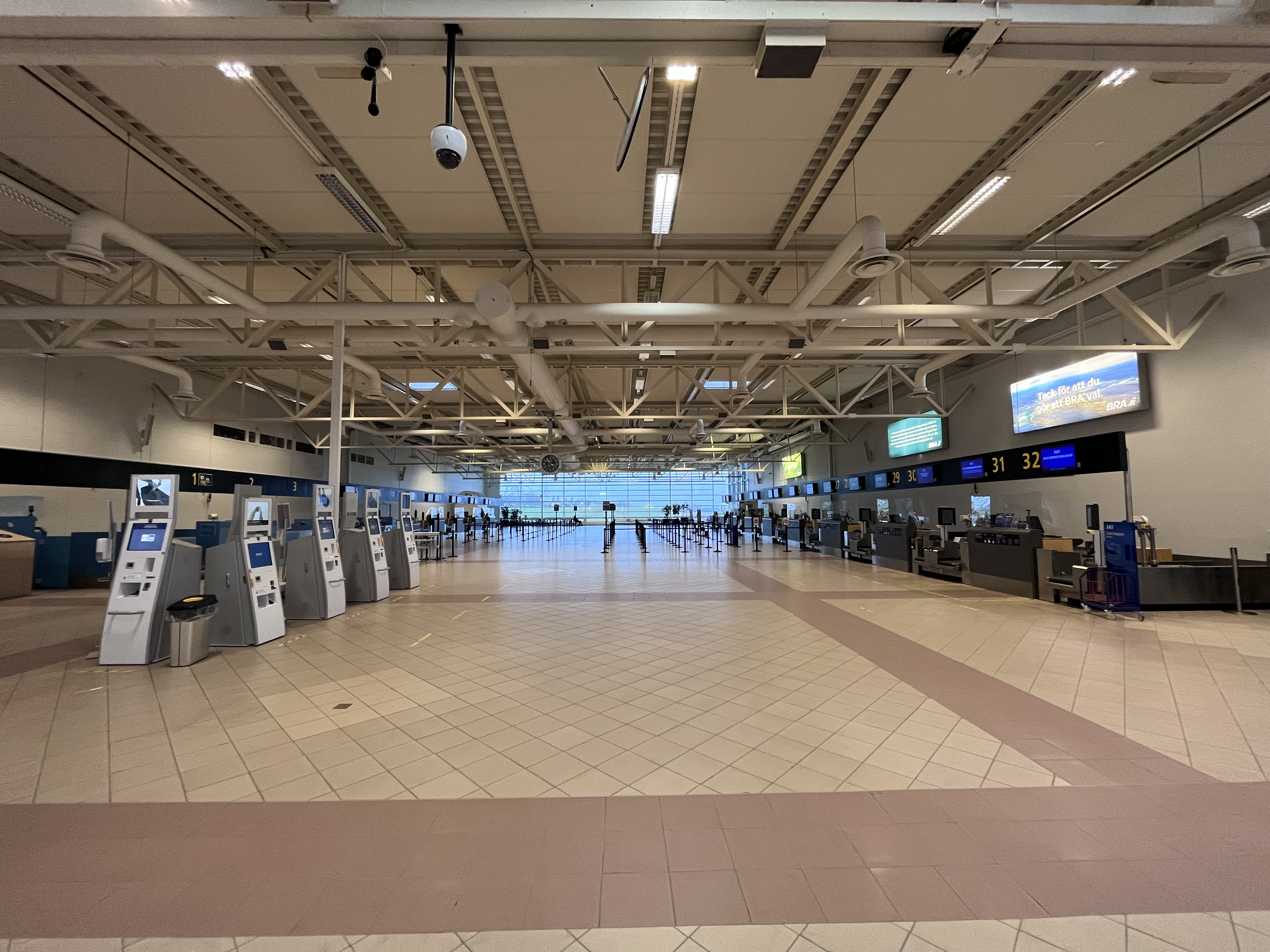
Check-in hall

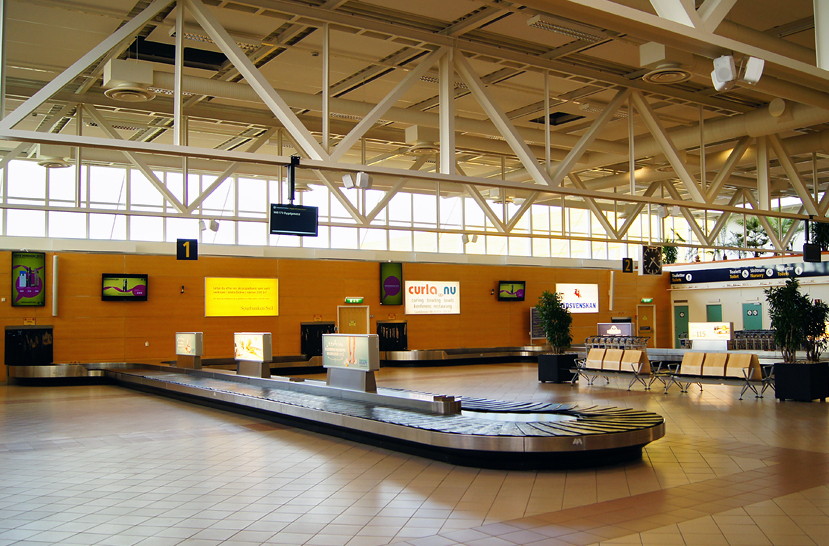
Baggage reclaim area

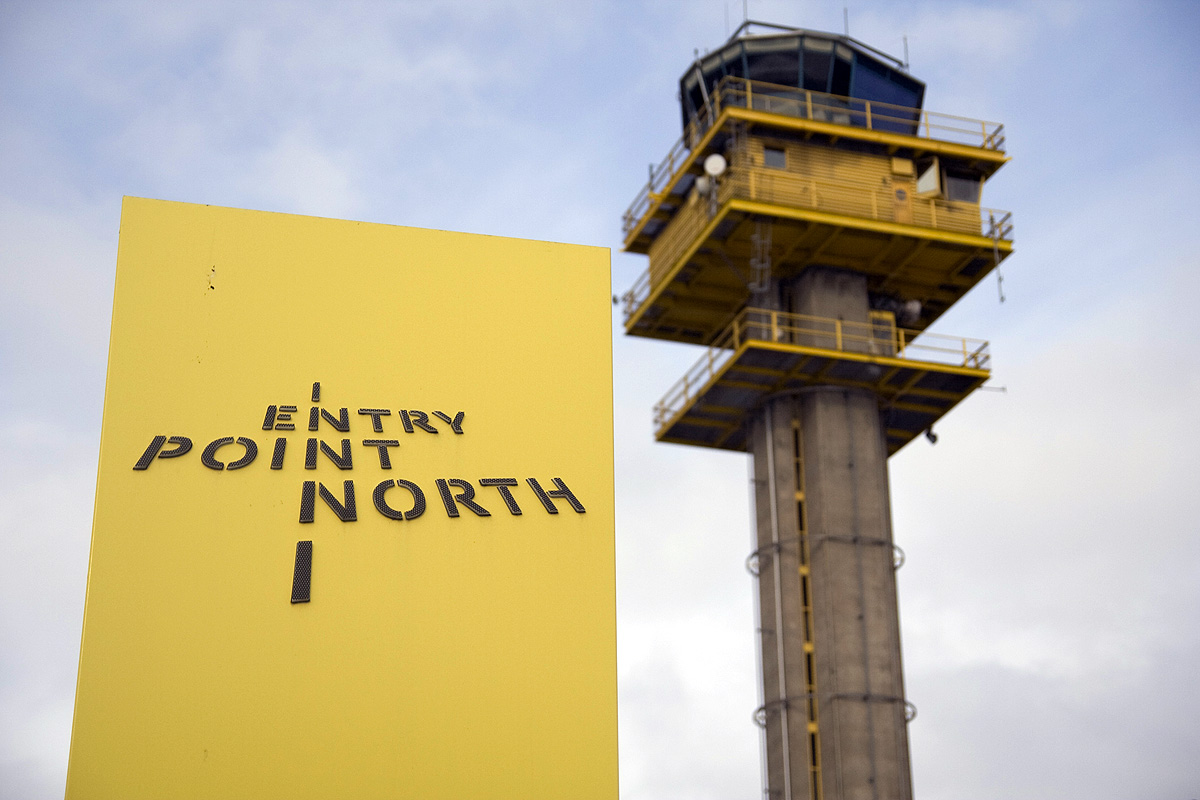
Control tower

Busiest routes to and from Malmö Airport (2024)
Rank	Airport	Passengers handled	% change 2023/24
1	Stockholm (Note: Includes flights to/from Stockholm–Arlanda and Stockholm–Bromma)	466,938	▼20.1
2	Skopje	64,009	▼14.6
3	{ Cluj-Napoca	38,514	▼16.9
4	Zagreb	33,972	▼5.1
5	Gdańsk	33,303	▼46.6
6	Tirana	30,181	▲35.8
7	Pristina	28,072	▼5.6
8	Gran Canaria	27,832	▼9.3
9	Palma de Mallorca	21,306	▼0.01
10	Rhodes	16,368	▲69.7

Traffic by calendar year
Year	Passenger volume	Change	Domestic	Change	International	Change
2025	855,483	▼5.5%	351,383	▼26.7%	504,100	▲18.3%
2024	905,443	▼30.2%	479,215	▼20.1%	426,228	▼38.9%
2023	1,296,830	▲0.5%	599,560	▲0.7%	697,270	▲0.2%
2022	1,290,964	▲95.2%	595,250	▲96.0%	695,714	▲94.4%
2021	661,507	▲25.7%	303,700	▲18.0%	357,807	▲33.1%
2020	526,179	▼73.4%	257,304	▼75.4%	268,875	▼71.1%
2019	1,975,479	▼8.0%	1,045,980	▼10.5%	929,499	▼5.1%
2018	2,147,933	▼1.7%	1,168,199	▼6.7%	979,734	▲5.0%
2017	2,185,485	▼1.5%	1,251,994	▲0.8%	933,491	▼4.5%
2016	2,219,565	▲2.2%	1,241,764	▲3.5%	977,801	▲0.6%
2015	2,171,557	▲4.0%	1,199,414	▲1.6%	972,143	▲7.0%
2014	2,088,388	▼1.8%	1,180,123	▲0.9%	908,265	▼3.1%
2013	2,127,564	▲1.1%	1,190,264	▼0.5%	937,300	▲3.3%
2012	2,104,013		1,196,830		907,183	

== Ground transportation ==
The airport will, starting in August 2026 be served by Skånetrafiken's regional public transport, with a new bus line, 147 taking passengers between the airport and Svedala Stortorget, close to a railway station. The airport also has regular Flygbussarna coach connections by to Malmö city centre as well as by Buss Bogdan Skåne to Lund. Additionally, Neptunbus connects all Wizz Air flights with Copenhagen.

== See also ==
- List of the largest airports in the Nordic countries
