= Halmstad Airport =

International airport serving Halmstad, Sweden

Halmstad Airport Halmstad City Airport

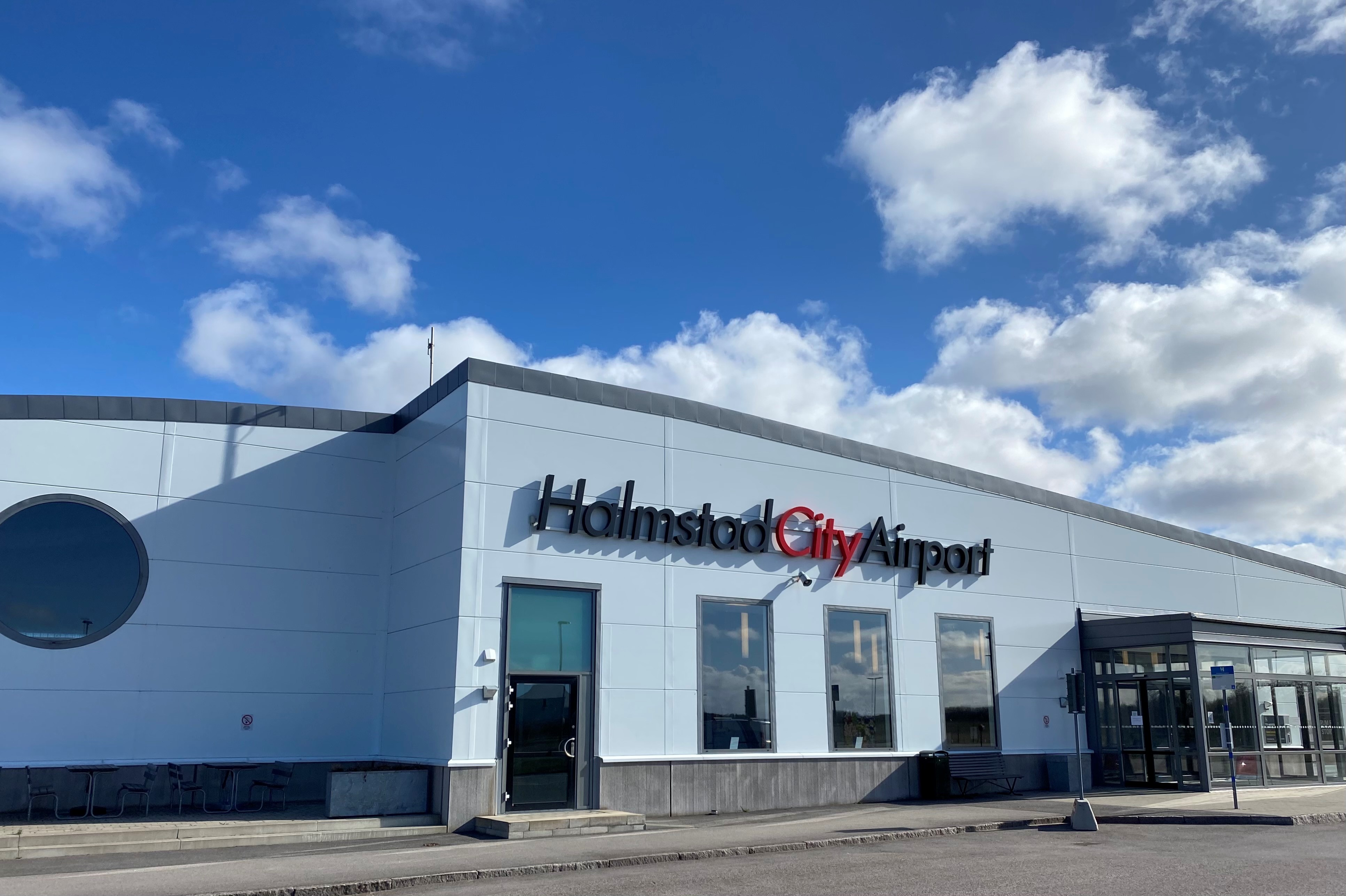
- IATA: HAD; ICAO: ESMT

Summary
- Airport type: Public
- Operator: Halmstad Flygplats AB
- Location: Halmstad, Sweden
- Elevation AMSL: 101 ft / 31 m
- Coordinates: 56°41′27″N 012°49′12″E
- Website: HalmstadsFlygplats.se

Map
- Location on a map of Halland, Sweden HAD (Sweden)

Runways
Direction	Length		Surface
Direction	m	ft	Surface
01/19	2,268	7,441	Asphalt
06/24	609	1,998	Grass

Statistics (2019)
- Passengers total: 124,415
- International passengers: 13,362
- Domestic passengers: 111,053
- Landings total: 3,640
- Source: AIP Sweden, Statistics: Swedish Transport Agency

Halmstad Airport (IATA: HAD, ICAO: ESMT), also known as Halmstad City Airport, is an airport situated 1 nautical mile (1.9 km; 1.2 mi) northwest of Halmstad, a city in the Halmstad Municipality of Halland County, Sweden. The airport has been managed by Halmstad Municipality since 2006.

Halmstad Airport served as an airforce base (F14) between 1944 and 1961. The airport is still supporting the military operations located in Halmstad. 800 to 1300 aircraft movements per year are military related.

== Facilities ==
The airport is at an elevation of 101 feet (31 m) above mean sea level. It has one runway designated 01/19 with an asphalt surface measuring 2,261 by 40 metres (7,418 ft × 131 ft).

== Airlines and destinations ==
The following airlines operate regular scheduled flights at Halmstad Airport:

Airlines	Destinations
GP Aviation	Seasonal: Pristina
Scandinavian Airlines	Stockholm–Arlanda

== Statistics ==
Traffic by calendar year
Year	Passenger volume	Change	State Domestic	Change	EU Domestic	Change
2019	124,415	▼7.8%	111,053	▼7.7%	13,362	▼8.5%
2018	134,916		120,314		14,602	

== See also ==
- List of the largest airports in the Nordic countries
