= Transport in Sweden =

Transport in Sweden is available for all four main modes of transport—air, bus, ferry and rail—assisting residents and visitors without their own vehicle to travel around much of Sweden's 450,295 square kilometres (173,860 sq mi).

== Rail ==
Rail transport is operated by SJ, VR Sverige, Green Cargo Vy Tåg and more. Most counties have companies that provide ticketing, marketing and financing of local passenger rail, but the actual operation is undertaken by the aforementioned companies. There are about 15,700 kilometres (9,800 miles) of railway, of which 14,400 km (8,900 mi) is nationalised and the remaining 1,300 km (810 mi) is owned by other operators. As of 2025, about 12,200 km (7,600 mi) of the railway is electrified. While most of the rails are built with a 1,435 mm (4 ft 8 1/2 in) gauge, more commonly known as standard gauge, there are about 261 km (162 mi) in 891 mm (2 ft 11 3/32 in), or Swedish three-foot-gauge. These tracks are mostly reserved for heritage railways, however, and only the Roslagsbanan has regular passenger traffic.

Trains generally keep to the left, as opposed to all neighbouring countries, a legacy of Sweden's driving direction prior to 1967. The exception to this is in southern Sweden, where trains south of Arlöv north of Malmö run with right-hand traffic.

=== Light rail and metros ===
A tram on the Lund tramway, which opened in 2020

Stockholm Metro (Stockholms tunnelbana) is the only metro system in Sweden. Cities with light rail (trams) include Gothenburg (consisting of 190 km (120 mi) on a total track length of 161 km (100 mi), Norrköping, several tram or light rail systems in Stockholm (the Tvärbanan, Nockebybanan, Lidingöbanan and Spårväg City), and a tramway system in Lund.

The most extensive network in Sweden is in Gothenburg with a total track length of 173 km (107 mi). Gothenburg started with the Horse Tramway in 1879 and over the years the tramway has expanded into the Nordic region's largest tramway system.

=== Railway links with adjacent countries ===
- Norway at Kornsjø (Gothenburg-Oslo), Charlottenberg/Eda (Stockholm-Oslo), Storlien (Östersund-Trondheim, not electrified Storlien-Trondheim) and Riksgränsen (Narvik-Kiruna)
  - same gauge – same voltage – same protection system. Most Swedish and Norwegian rail vehicles can cross the border. As there is only single-track at all border crossings, there is no need for bridges to make the transition from left- to right-hand traffic.
- Finland at Tornio/Haparanda
  - break-of-gauge 1,435 mm (4 ft 8 1/2 in)/1,524 mm (5 ft) – other protection system. All freight has to be reloaded. No passenger traffic by rail.
- Denmark at the Öresund bridge
  - same gauge – voltage change 15kVAC/25kVAC – other protection system. Only custom made locomotives or EMUs can cross the border. Bridges to make the transition from left- to right-hand traffic, are located north of Malmö, so all traffic south of Malmö is in right-hand traffic.

== Road ==
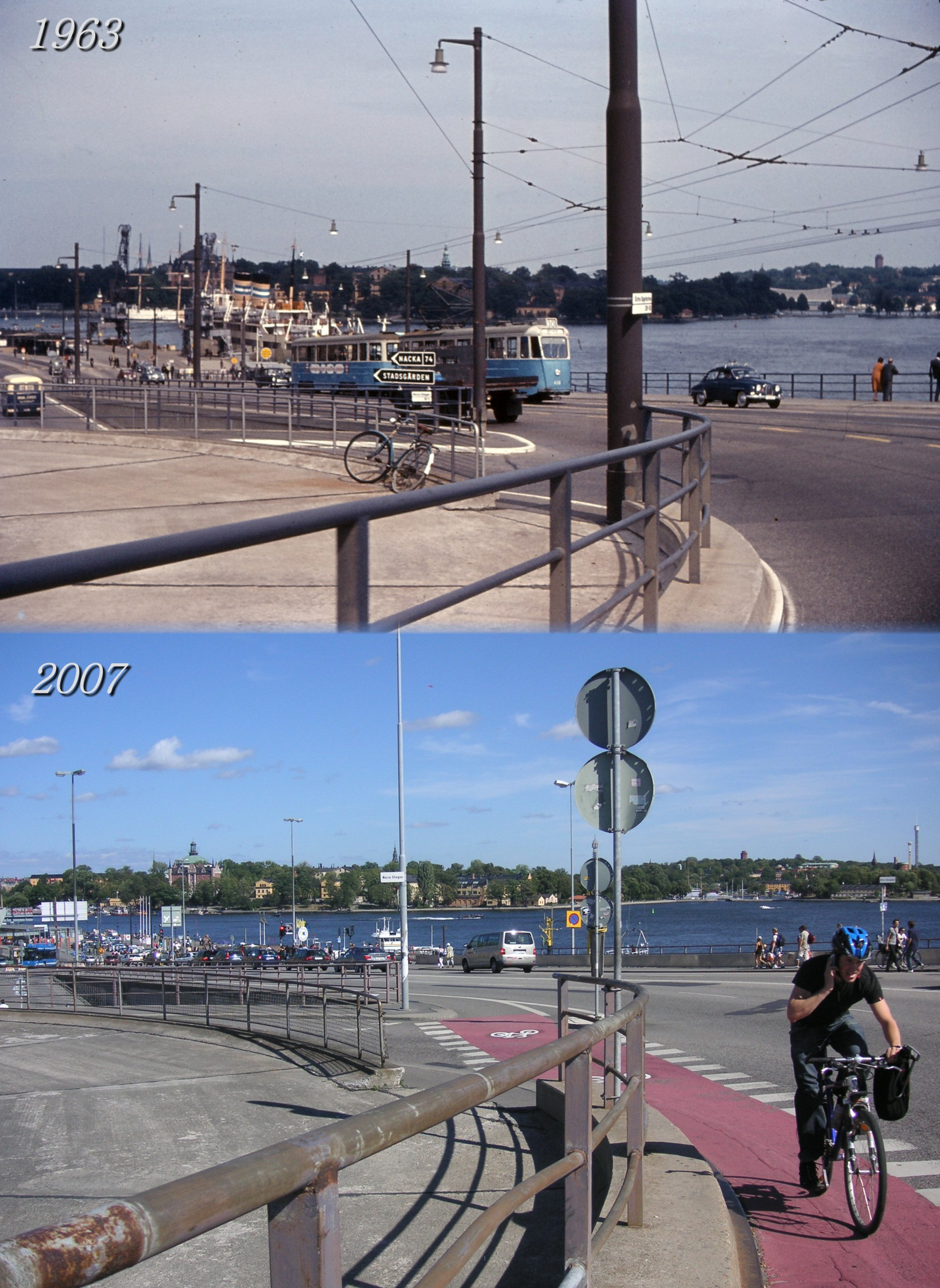
Above: Left-hand traffic in Slussen in 1963. Below: Right-hand traffic in Slussen in 2007.

Sweden has right-hand traffic today, like all of its neighbours. Sweden had left-hand traffic (Vänstertrafik in Swedish) from approximately 1736 and continued to do so until 1967. Despite this, virtually all cars in Sweden were actually left-hand drive and the neighbouring Nordic countries already drove on the right, leading to mistakes by visitors. The Swedish voters rejected a change to driving on the right in a referendum held in 1955.

Nevertheless, in 1963 the Riksdag passed legislation ordering the switch to right-hand traffic. The changeover took place on a Sunday morning at 5am on September 3, 1967, which was known in Swedish as Dagen H (H-Day), the 'H' standing for Högertrafik or right-hand traffic.

Since Swedish cars were left-hand drive, experts had suggested that changing to driving on the right would reduce accidents, because drivers would have a better view of the road ahead. Indeed, fatal car-to-car and car-to-pedestrian accidents did drop sharply as a result. This was likely due to drivers initially being more careful and because of the initially very low speed limits, since accident rates soon returned to nearly the same as earlier.

Total roadways: 572,900 km (356,000 mi), as of 2009.

=== Motorways ===
Motorways run through Sweden, Denmark and over the Öresund Bridge to Stockholm, Gothenburg, Uppsala and Uddevalla. The system of motorways is still being extended. The longest continuous motorways are Värnamo–Gävle (E4; 585 km) and the Norwegian border–Vellinge (E6; 482 km; as the motorway between Trelleborg and Oslo in Norway has been completed in 2015).

== Ports and harbours ==
There are 2,052 km (1,275 mi) of waterways in Sweden.

There are 19 ports which are navigable to small steamers and barges.

- Gothenburg
- Gävle
- Halmstad
- Helsingborg
- Hudiksvall
- Kalmar
- Kapellskär
- Karlshamn
- Karlskrona
- Lidköping
- Malmö
- Norrköping
- Nynäshamn
- Stockholm
- Sundsvall
- Sölvesborg
- Trelleborg
- Varberg
- Västerås

== Air ==
In 2012, there were 230 airports in Sweden. Of these, 149 have paved runways, with three (Stockholm Arlanda, Göteborg Landvetter and Luleå) being over 3,047 metres (9,997 ft) long. There are over eighty airports with unpaved runways. A large number of war-time airfields exist in various lengths, usually built into roads, and are usually less than 1,000 metres (3,300 ft) long.

Every hospital, airport and military base has a helipad.

=== List of large airports ===
- Säve Airport, Gothenburg
- Göteborg Landvetter Airport
- Jönköping Airport
- Luleå Airport
- Malmö Airport
- Stockholm Arlanda Airport
- Stockholm Bromma Airport
- Stockholm Skavsta Airport
- Umeå Airport
- Växjö-Kronoberg Airport
- Örebro Airport

== See also ==
- Ministry of Rural Affairs and Infrastructure (Sweden)
- Scandinavian Airlines
- Volvo, Saab Automobile, Saab, Scania
- Estonia disaster
- Transport in Denmark
- Transport in Finland
- Transport in Norway
