= List of defunct airlines of Sweden =

This is a list of defunct airlines of Sweden.

Airline	Image	IATA	ICAO	Callsign	Commenced operations	Ceased operations	Notes
A
Abal Air					1982	1990	Established as LBF-Eda Varken. Renamed Time Air Sweden. Operated Piper Navajo
Aer Olympic					2009	2011	Operated Boeing 737-300, Boeing 737-800
Aero Scandia					1950	1950	Renamed Airtaco
Aerocenter Trafikfyg					1975	1981	Renamed Aerocenter i Växjö AB
Aerotransport					1924	1951	Also known as AB Aerotransport. Merged into SAS.
Air Express					1986	2000	Acquired to form Skyways Regional
Air Express Sweden			AEQ	LUNA		2009	Purchased by MCA Airlines
Air Forum					1990	1993	Operated Short Skyvan
Air Hudik					1985	1992	Operated Short 360, Dornier 228, Beech King Air
Air Nordic		DJ	NDC		1990	1997	Operated BAe Jetstream 31, Fokker F27, Saab 340
Air One			ONE		1989	1994	Operated Boeing 737-200
Air Ops			OOE	AIROPS	1993	1996	Operated Lockheed Tristar
Air Sweden		SL		AIR SWEDEN	1991	1993	Also known as Time Air Sweden
Air Sweden			SNX	SNOWFLAKE	2009	2011	
Air Trader					1970	1973	Operated Vickers Vanguard
Airborne of Sweden			MIW		1988	2001	To form Skyways Regional. Operated BAe Jetstream 31, Dornier 228, Cessna 402
Airtaco					1950	1957	Established as Aero Scandia. Merged into Linjeflyg. Operated Douglas DC-3, Lockheed Lodestar, Lockheed Super Electra
AMA Air Express					1976	1985	Renamed AMA Norving. Operated Swearingen Metro II
Andersson Business Jet					2012	2013	Renamed Bromma Business Jet and Svenskt Industriflyg in 2016
Arosflyg					1946	1951	Operated de Havilland DH.60 Moth, Noorduyn Norseman
Avia					1944	1992	Merged into Salair and renamed Skyways Express
Avia Express		JX	SKX	SKY EXPRESS	1940	2011	
Avitrans		2Q	ETS	EXTRANS	2004	2010	
B
Baltic Aviation			BAB		1978	1988	Renamed Baltic Airlines
Barents AirLink		8N	NKF	NORDFLIGHT	2006	2016	Merged into Scandinavian AirAmbulance
Björkvallsflyg					1934	1945	Founded by Kurt Björkvall. Renamed Skandinaviska Aero. Operated Caudron Simoun, Waco YKS-7
Blekingeflyg						2016	Formed part of Sverigeflyg
Blue Scandinavian		6B	BLX		1996	1998	Rebranded as Britannia Airways AB
Braathens Malmö Aviation		BU	SCW		1999	2000	Renamed Malmö Aviation
Braathens Sverige		TQ	TQA	BRAATHENS	1998	1999	Merged into Malmö Aviation
Britannia Nordic		6B	BLX		1998	2006	Rebranded as TUIfly Nordic. Operated Boeing 737-800, Boeing 757-200
Bromma Business Jet					2013	2016	Established as Andersson Business Jet. Renamed Svenskt Industriflyg. Operated Dassault Falcon 7X
C
Capella Aircharter					1967	1969	Operated Douglas DC-3
City Air Scandinavia		6E	SCW		1992	1993	Merged into Malmö Aviation
City Airline		CF	FDR	SWEDESTAR	1997	2011	Merged with Skyways
Crownair					1968	1975	Merged with Svensk Flygtjanst to form Swedair
D
Direktflyg		HS	HSV	HIGHSWEDE	2000	2019	
E
Euro Flight Sweden		HZ	EUW		1995	2001	Operated Beech 1900, Cessna Citation II
European Executive Express		RY	EXC	ECHO EXPRESS	1997	2005	
F
Fairline					1967	1967	Formed to succeed Tor-Air. Operated Curtiss C-46
Falcon Air		IH	FCN	FALCON	1986	2006	
Falconair					1967	1970	Operated Lockheed L-188 Electra, Vickers Viscount
Fly Logic Sweden					1997	2012	Rebranded as North Express
FlyEuropean					2000	2001	Operated BAC 1-11
FlyExcellent		F3	FXL		2007	2008	Operated MD-83
Flyglinjen		U3			2010	2014	Rebranded as Sparrow Aviation
Flying Enterprise					1992	2000	Renamed Skyways Enterprise. Operated Fokker 50
FlyMe		SH	FLY	FLYBIRD	2003	2007	
FlyNordic		LF	NDC	NORDIC	2003	2007	To Norwegian Air Shuttle
FlySmaland					2009	2016	Formed part of Sverigeflyg, rebranded as Östersundsflyg. Operated Saab 2000
G
Golden Air					1976	1993	Renamed Golden Air Flyg. Formed part of Sverigeflyg
Golden Air Flyg		DC	GAO		1993	2012	Established as Golden Air. Renamed Braathens Regional
Goodjet					2002	2003	Low cost services. Declared bankrupt
Gotia Shuttle Express		G4			1989	1994	Operated Saab 340
Gotlandsflyg					2001	2016	Formed part of Sverigeflyg
H
Helimatic					1993	2009	Acquired by HeliAir Sweden. Operated Hughes 369
Highland Air					1995	2000	Established as Holmström Air. Acquired by Skyways Regional. Operated Dornier 228
Hilair					1969	1972	Established as Hillerstrom Flyg. Acquired by Malmros Aviation
Höga Kusten Flyg		2N	NTJ	NEXTJET	2007	2017	Virtual airline, purchased Nextjet and merged operations.
Holmström Flyg		HJ	ENT		1966	1995	Founded by John-Olof Holmström. Went bankrupt. Operated Dornier 228
I
IBA (International Business Air)		6I	IBZ		1983	2007	Renamed Aerosynchro Aviation. Operated Embraer Brasilia, Fairchild Metro III, Piper Navajo
Internord Aviation		NK		INTERNORD	1965	1968	
Interswede Aviation					1971	1972	Operated Douglas DC-8
J
Jämtlands Flyg					1954	2019	
JE Time Sweden					2010	2013	Merged into Nordic Air Sweden
Jet 2000			SJT		2001	2001	
K
Kalmarflyg					2007	2016	Formed part of Sverigeflyg. Operated Saab 340
Kalmarplanet					2006	2007	Rebranded as Kalmarflyg
Kiruna Flyg					1994	2001	Acquired by Kallax Flyg. Operated Bell 206, AS350
Kullaflyg		DC	BRX	BRAATHENS	2003	2016	Formed part of Sverigeflyg
Kungsair					1967	1971	Renamed Nya Kungsair I Norrkoping. Operated Piper Navajo
Kungsair I Goteborg					1967	1981	Operated Cessna Citation I, Cessna Citation II
L
LapAir					1953	2012	Operated Junkers W 34, Noorduyn Norseman, Republic Seabee, Bell 47, Bell 206
LBF-Eda Varken					1955	1982	To Air Sweden
Linjeflyg		LF	LIN	SWEDLINE	1957	1993	Merged into SAS
Loadair					1963	1964	Operated Lockheed Lodestar, Douglas DC-3
Lufttransport					2001	2016	To Babcock Scandinavian AirAmbulance
M
Malmö Aviation		MJ	SCW		1981	1992	Acquired bt City Air Scandinavia
Malmö Aviation		6E	SCW		1993	1999	Renamed/merged to Braathens Malmö Aviation
Malmros Aviation					1971	1978	Acquired by Basair
Maxair		8M	MXL	MAXAIR	1996	2005	
MCA Airlines			MCA	CALSON	2008	2009	
N
Nextjet		2N	NTJ	NEXJET	2002	2018	
Nordic Airlink		LF	NDC		2001	2004	Rebranded as FlyNordic
Nordic Airways		6N	NRD	NORTH RIDER	2004	2009	To Air Sweden
Nordic East Airways		4F / N7	ELN	NEA	1991	1996	Renamed Nordic European Airlines
Nordic European Airlines		DJ	NOD	NORDIC	1991	1998	
Nordic Leisure		6N	NRD		2004	2005	Renamed/merged to Nordic Airways
Nordic Regional		6N	NRD	NORTH RIDER	2004	2008	
Nordisk Aerotransport					1950	1953	Renamed Transair Sweden
Nordkalottflyg		8N	NKF	NORDFLIGHT	1974	2006	Renamed Barents AirLink
Norrlandsflyg			HMF	LIFEGUARD SWEDEN	1961	2011	
North Cross Air					1990	1993	Established from the assets of Liz-Air. Operated Dornier 228
Novair		N9	NVR	NAVIGATOR	1997	2023	
Nya Kungsair I Norrkoping					1971	1979	Established as Kungsair. Operated Piper Navajo
O
Orebro Air					1975	1985	
Osterman Air Charter		CG			1962	1965	Founded by Lennart Osterman. Merged with Aero-Nord to form Internord. Operated Douglas DC-6, Douglas DC-7
P
Polarhelikopter					1993	2006	Acquired by Kallax Flyg. Operated Hughes 500, Eurocopter EC120
R
Reguljair					1996	2000	To FlyNordic
Rehnström Aero					1969	2009	Acquired by HeliAir Sweden. Operated Hughes 269, Schweizer 269C, Schweizer 330
S
Saab Nyge Aero			TGT		1990	2015	Established as Nyge Aero. Operated Beech Super King Air, Learjet 35, MD Explorer, Mitsubishi MU-2
Salair		YD	SKX		1976	1993	Merged into Skyways Express
Salenia Aviation					1989	1991	Charter carrier. Operated DC-10, Saab 340
SAS Commuter		SK	SAS	SCANDINAVIAN	1988	2004	Merged into SAS Group
Scanair		DK	VKG	VIKING	1961	1994	Merged with Conair of Scandinavia to form Premiair
ScanBee					1977	1985	Operated Convair 340, Convair 580
Skyline		OX			1971	1977	
Skyways		JZ	SKK	SKY EXPRESS	1993	2012	
Snowflake		SK	SAS	SCANDINAVIAN	2002	2003	
Sparrow Aviation		9I			2010	2018	
Sterling Airways Sweden					1970	1973	Operated Lockheed L-188 Electra
Sterner Aero		JG			1978	1979	Merged into Swedair
Sundsvallsflyg		DC	GAO	GOLDEN AIR	2001	2016	Formed part of Sverigeflyg
Sunways		IS	SWY	SUNWAYS	1995	1997	
Svea Flyg					1998	2000	Established as WestEastAir. Operated BAe Jetstream 31
Svensk Flygtjänst AB					1935	1975	Merged with Crownair to form Swedair. Operated Bucker Jungmann, Fairey Firefly, Douglas Skyraider
Svensk Interkontinental Lufttraffik					1943	1946	Founded by Marcus Wallenburg. Became the Swedish part of SAS. Operated Convair 340, Convair 580
Svensk Lufttrafik					1919	1920	
Svenska Aero AB					1954	1963	Operated de Havilland Dragon Rapide
Sverigeflyg		DC	BRX	BRAATHENS	2001	2016	Merged into BRA Braathens Regional Airlines
Swe Aviation Europe		S6 / S9	SWL		1997	2001	Renamed/merged to Transjet Airways
Swe Fly		WV	SWV	FLYING SWEDE	1994	2005	
Swedair					1935	1994	
Sweden Airways		SW			1992	1994	Operated Fairchild F-27
Swedeways		HJ	SWE		1993	2001	Established as Air Hudiksvall. Operated Douglas DC-9
Swedewings					1987	1999	To FlyNordic. Operated DHC-6 Twin Otter, Piper Chieftain
Swedish Intercontinental Airlines					1943	1977	Merged into SAS in 1948
SwedJet Airlines		VD	BBB	BLACKBIRD	2001	2006	Operated Canadair CRJ100
Swedline Express		SM	SRL	STARLINE	2002	2006	
Syd-Aero		UF			1966	1979	Operated DHC-6 Twin Otter, Short 330
T
Time Air Sweden		SL	SDN	AIR SWEDEN	1991	1993	
Tor Air		OD	OAI	TORLINE	2008	2011	
Tor-Air					1964	1966	Operated Curtiss C-46, Douglas DC-3
Transair Sweden		TB	TSA		1950	1981	
Transair Sweden			TWE		2001	2003	Filed for bankruptcy on 16 January 2003. Operated Boeing 757-200
Transjet Airways		S9	SWL		2001	2002	Filed for Chapter 11 bankruptcy in 2002. Operated Boeing 747
Transwede Airways		TQ	TWE	TRANSWEDE	1985	1998	Scheduled division merged into Braathens SAFE. Charter division became Blue Scandinavian.
Transwede Airways (2005–10)		5T	TWE	TRANSWEDE	2005	2010	
Transwede Leisure			TWE		1996	1996	Renamed/merged to Blue Scandinavian
Trygg Flyg		YC	TYG	TRYGG	1991	2002	Operated CASA C-212, Saab 340
V
Varmlandsflyg					1993	2002	Renamed Swedline Express. Operated Beech 1900, Saab 340
Viking Airlines		4P	VIK	SWEDJET	2003	2010	
W
West Air Sweden			SWN		1992	2008	Merged with Atlantic Airlines UK and West Air Luxembourg trading as West Atlantic

== See also ==
- List of airlines of Sweden
- List of airports in Sweden
