= List of airlines of Sweden =

This is a list of airlines which have an air operator's certificate issued by the Swedish Transport Agency of Sweden.

== Scheduled airlines ==
Airline		Image	IATA	ICAO	Callsign	Hub airport(s)	Notes
BRA Braathens Regional Airlines	Braathens Regional Airways		DC	BRX	BRAATHENS	Stockholm-Bromma Airport	
BRA Braathens Regional Airlines	Braathens Regional Aviation		TF	SCW	SCANWING	Stockholm-Bromma Airport	
Jonair				JON	JONAIR	Umeå Airport	
PopulAir			HP	APF	AMAPOLA	Stockholm-Arlanda Airport	
Norwegian Air Sweden			D8	NSZ	REDNOSE	Stockholm-Arlanda Airport	
Scandinavian Airlines			SK	SAS	SCANDINAVIAN	Stockholm-Arlanda Airport	Joint flag carrier between Denmark, Norway, and Sweden. Headquartered and registered in Sweden as SAS AB. Owned by Government of Denmark - 25.8% Danish Lind Invest - 8.6% Castlelake - 32% Air France-KLM -19.9%
Västflyg							

== Charter airlines ==
Airline	Image	IATA	ICAO	Callsign	Hub airport(s)	Notes
Grafair				GRAFAIR	Stockholm-Bromma Airport	
Aerosynchro Aviation		6I	IBZ	INTERBIZ	Stockholm-Bromma Airport	
Scandinavian AirAmbulance				MEDIFLIGHT		
TUIfly Nordic		6B	BLX	BLUESCAN	Stockholm-Arlanda Airport	
WaltAir		XW	GOT	GOTHIC		

== Cargo airlines ==
Airline	Image	IATA	ICAO	Callsign	Hub airport(s)	Notes
Amapola Flyg			APF	AMAPOLA	Stockholm-Arlanda Airport	
Nord-Flyg			NEF	NORDEX	Eskilstuna Airport	
West Air Sweden		PT	SWN	AIR SWEDEN	Malmö Airport	

== See also ==
- List of defunct airlines in Sweden
- List of defunct airlines of Europe
- List of airlines
