= Direktflyg =

Swedish virtual airline

IATA	ICAO	Call sign
HS	HSV	HIGHSWEDE
- Founded: 2000
- Ceased operations: 2019
- Fleet size: 0
- Destinations: 5
- Headquarters: Borlänge, Sweden
- Key people: Tezz Tordsdotter Ohlsson
- Website: direktflyg.com

Direktflyg, officially Svenska Direktflyg AB, was a regional airline based in Borlänge, Sweden which operated services to seven domestic destinations. The company also served as an aircraft lessor, through its subsidiary Largus Aviation.

== History ==
The airline was formed in 2000, to bring together Skyway Holding's regional carriers, Air Express, Highland Air and Airborne, into one consolidated operation, and started operations in October 2000.

Airborne began in 1984 when it was known as Sundsvall Aero.

Highland Air began in September 1995 and was acquired by Skyways in March 1997.

Air Express was founded in 1986 and was purchased by Skyways from major shareholder Thomas Sjö in 1999. In April 2002 the airline rebranded as Direktflyg following acquisition by the Largus-Group. On 22 May 2012, parent company Skyways Express AB and sister airline City Airline AB filed for bankruptcy.

As of January 2015, Direktflyg ceased to operate with its own fleet. Services have been transferred to AIS Airlines and rebranded accordingly. AIS Airlines had already served as a major codeshare operator for Direktflyg. From 1/7 2018 Amapola flyg are flying to the north parts of Sweden following the bankruptcy of Nextjet.

In December 2019, the airline was merged into Amapola Flyg.

== Destinations ==
Direktflyg operated to the following destinations:

Country	City	Airport	Notes
Denmark	Copenhagen	Copenhagen Airport	
Finland	Helsinki	Helsinki Airport	
Finland	Seinäjoki	Seinäjoki Airport	
Lithuania	Palanga	Palanga International Airport	
Norway	Brønnøysund	Brønnøysund Airport, Brønnøy	Charter
Norway	Kristiansund	Kristiansund Airport, Kvernberget	Charter
Norway	Oslo	Oslo Airport, Gardermoen	
Norway	Trondheim	Trondheim Airport, Værnes	Base
Poland	Szczecin	Szczecin Airport	
Sweden	Borlänge	Borlänge Airport	Main base
Sweden	Gällivare	Gällivare Airport	
Sweden	Gothenburg	Göteborg Landvetter Airport	
Sweden	Hagfors	Hagfors Airport	
Sweden	Halmstad	Halmstad Airport	
Sweden	Karlstad	Karlstad Airport	
Sweden	Kiruna	Kiruna Airport	
Sweden	Kristianstad	Kristianstad Airport	
Sweden	Linköping	Linköping Airport	
Sweden	Luleå	Luleå Airport	
Sweden	Malmö	Malmö Airport	
Sweden	Norrköping	Norrköping Airport	
Sweden	Oskarshamn	Oskarshamn Airport	
Sweden	Örebro	Örebro Airport	
Sweden	Örnsköldsvik	Örnsköldsvik Airport	
Sweden	Östersund	Åre Östersund Airport	
Sweden	Stockholm	Stockholm Arlanda Airport	
Sweden	Stockholm	Stockholm Bromma Airport	
Sweden	Stockholm	Stockholm Västerås Airport	
Sweden	Sundsvall	Sundsvall–Timrå Airport	
Sweden	Torsby	Torsby Airport	
Sweden	Umeå	Umeå Airport	
Sweden	Visby	Visby Airport	

== Fleet ==
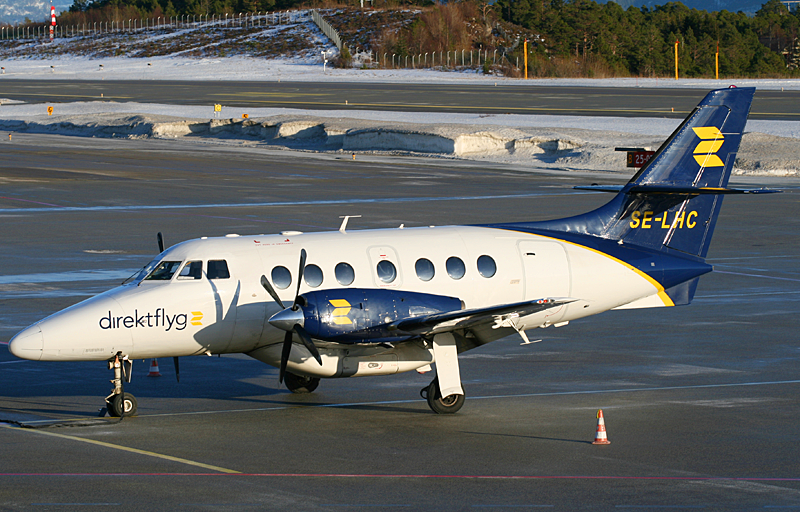
Direktflyg BAe Jetstream 32

As of December 2015 Direktflyg had no fleet. The aircraft from AIS Airlines include the following:

Direktflyg
Aircraft	In fleet	Passengers	Notes
BAe Jetstream 32	3	19	Operated by AIS Airlines
Total	3		

== See also ==
- Airlines
- Transport in Sweden
