= EUW =

EUW may refer to:

- EUW, ICAO airline code for EFS European Flight Service (Eurowest)
- EUW, ICAO code for Euro Flight Sweden, a defunct airline
- European Union of Women, members of which comprise the Conservative Women's Organisation's Executive Committee
- EUW, a League of Legends server in Western Europe and location of the 2013 SCAN & NVIDIA EUW Invitational played by Freeze (gamer)
