= FlyNordic =

Airline based in Stockholm, Sweden (1996–2008)

IATA	ICAO	Call sign
LF	NDC	NORDIC
- Founded: 1996 (as Reguljair)
- Ceased operations: 5 April 2008
- Operating bases: Stockholm Arlanda Airport
- Parent company: Finnair Group; Norwegian Air Shuttle
- Headquarters: Stockholm, Sweden
- Key people: Maunu von Lüders (CEO)
- Website: Flynordic.com

FlyNordic was an airline based in Stockholm, Sweden. It operated scheduled and charter services in Scandinavia and Europe. Its main base was Stockholm-Arlanda Airport, Stockholm. In 2007, the airline was bought by Norwegian Air Shuttle and became a fully integrated part of the latter.

== History ==
Originally established as Reguljair in 1996, the airline operated domestic services with an Embraer EMB 110 Bandeirante. Its operating licence was revoked on 14 November 2000, and it relaunched in December as Nordic East. Finnair acquired the company in 2003 and 2004, establishing a new subsidiary, Nordic Airlink Holding, and rebranding as FlyNordic. FlyNordic bankrupted in 2005, while Nordic Airlink Holding was reorganised and took up the FlyNordic name.

On 24 April 2007, Norwegian Air Shuttle announced that they had bought 100% of the FlyNordic shares from Finnair. This made Norwegian Scandinavia's largest low-cost airline. As a result of Finnair's ownership in FlyNordic, Finnair owned 5% of Norwegian Air Shuttle.

On 14 March 2008, Norwegian Air Shuttle announced that FlyNordic would be re-branded Norwegian after 5 April 2008 in order to strengthen and unify the brand. This ended the story of FlyNordic.

== Destinations ==
FlyNordic operated the following services (at March 2008):

- Bosnia and Herzegovina
  - Sarajevo (Sarajevo International Airport)
- Croatia
  - Dubrovnik (Dubrovnik Airport)
  - Split (Split Airport)
- Denmark
  - Copenhagen (Copenhagen Airport)
- Estonia
  - Tallinn (Lennart Meri Tallinn Airport) [seasonal]
- France
  - Bordeaux (Aéroport de Bordeaux Mérignac)
  - Nice (Côte d'Azur International Airport)
  - Paris (Orly Airport)
- Italy
  - Alghero (Fertilia Airport) [seasonal]
- Ireland
  - Dublin (Dublin Airport) [seasonal]
- Norway
  - Bergen (Bergen Airport, Flesland) [seasonal]
  - Oslo (Oslo Airport, Gardermoen)
- Poland
  - Kraków (John Paul II International Airport)
  - Warsaw (Frederic Chopin Airport)
- Serbia
  - Belgrade (Belgrade Nikola Tesla Airport)
- Spain
  - Alicante (Alicante Airport)
  - Málaga (Málaga Airport)
- Sweden
  - Kiruna (Kiruna Airport)
  - Luleå (Luleå Airport)
  - Malmö (Malmö Airport)
  - Östersund (Åre Östersund Airport)
  - Stockholm (Stockholm-Arlanda Airport)
  - Umeå (Umeå Airport)
- Switzerland
  - Geneva (Geneva Cointrin International Airport)
- Turkey
  - Istanbul (Sabiha Gökçen Airport)

== Fleet ==
The FlyNordic fleet included the following aircraft as of January 2008:

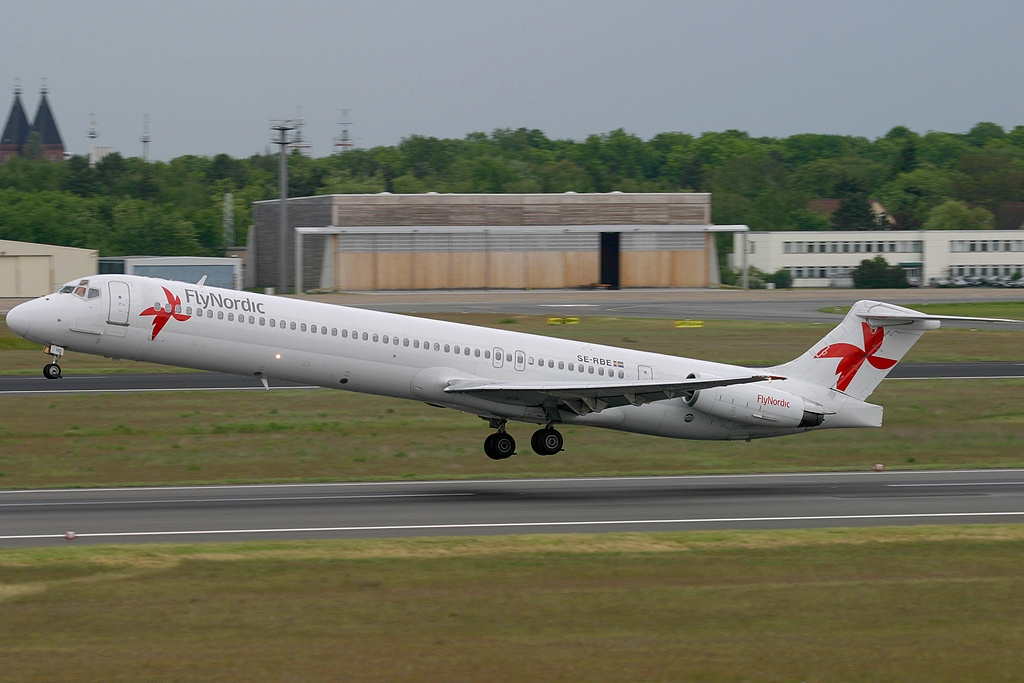
A MD-82 in the final livery of the airline

flyNordic fleet
Type	Total	Passengers	Routes	Notes
McDonnell Douglas MD-82	3	149-164	European	
McDonnell Douglas MD-83	4	149-164	European	

== See also ==
- Airlines
- Transport in Sweden
