= Transwede Airways =

Airline of Sweden (1985–1998)

Transwede
IATA	ICAO	Call sign
TQ	TWE	TRANSWEDE
- Founded: 1 April 1985
- Ceased operations: 1 January 1998 (merged into Braathens SAFE)
- Operating bases: Stockholm Arlanda Airport
- Fleet size: 7 (1997)
- Destinations: 7 (1998)
- Parent company: Braganza
- Headquarters: Sigtuna Municipality, Sweden
- Founder: Thomas Johansson

Transwede Airways AB (later Braathens Sverige AB), was a Swedish charter and later also scheduled airline operating between 1985 and 1998. Based at Stockholm Arlanda Airport, Transwede initially flew Sud Aviation Caravelles, and from 1987 also McDonnell Douglas MD-80s. Most charter services were operated for package tour companies to the Mediterranean.

The first scheduled services were from Stockholm to London in 1991. After the Swedish domestic market was deregulated the following year, Transwede variously started services from Stockholm to Visby, Umeå, Luleå, Sundsvall, Malmö and Halmstad. From 1993, the domestic services were conducted using Fokker 100 aircraft. The airline had a domestic market share of about 13 percent in Sweden.

The airline was split up in 1996, following a period of losses. The charter division was sold to Fritidsresor, who renamed the airline Blue Scandinavia. Through a series of purchases, the airline is known as TUIfly Nordic since 2006. The scheduled division was acquired by Norwegian carrier Braathens SAFE, who renamed the two airlines Braathens from 1998, integrating Transwede's operations into their own.

== History ==
=== Establishment and early years ===
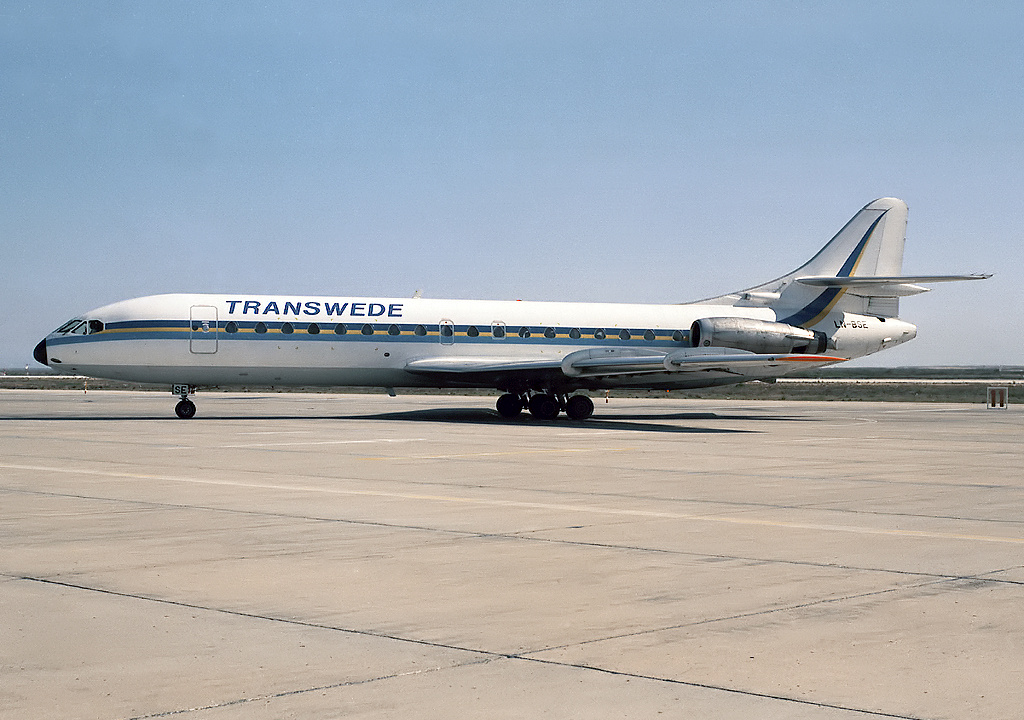
A Sud Aviation Super Caravelle at Faro Airport in 1986

Transwede was founded on 1 April 1985 in Växjö by Thomas Johansson, who was also the company's first president. He had previously founded the airline Air Sweden. Johansson intended to fill the gap created after the last Swedish package tour operator, Transair Sweden, ceased operations in 1979. The airline initially bought two 109-seat Sud Aviation Super Caravelles and was contracted by Royal Tours. The airline moved its main base to Stockholm Arlanda Airport the following year. It acquired the tour operator Royal Tours in November 1986 in order to secure access to 200,000 annual charter passengers.

Within a year, the airline bought two McDonnell Douglas MD-83 aircraft to supplement its Caravelles. Those were used from 1987 onwards on charter services to various destinations, including from Stockholm via Oslo, Norway, and Gander, Canada, to Fort Lauderdale in the United States. The 414-kilometer (257 mi) Oslo to Gander leg was the longest MD-80 revenue leg in the world. By 1990, the fleet was substantially increased, adding a Boeing 737-200, two Boeing 737-300s, two MD-87s and bringing the number of MD-83s up to four.

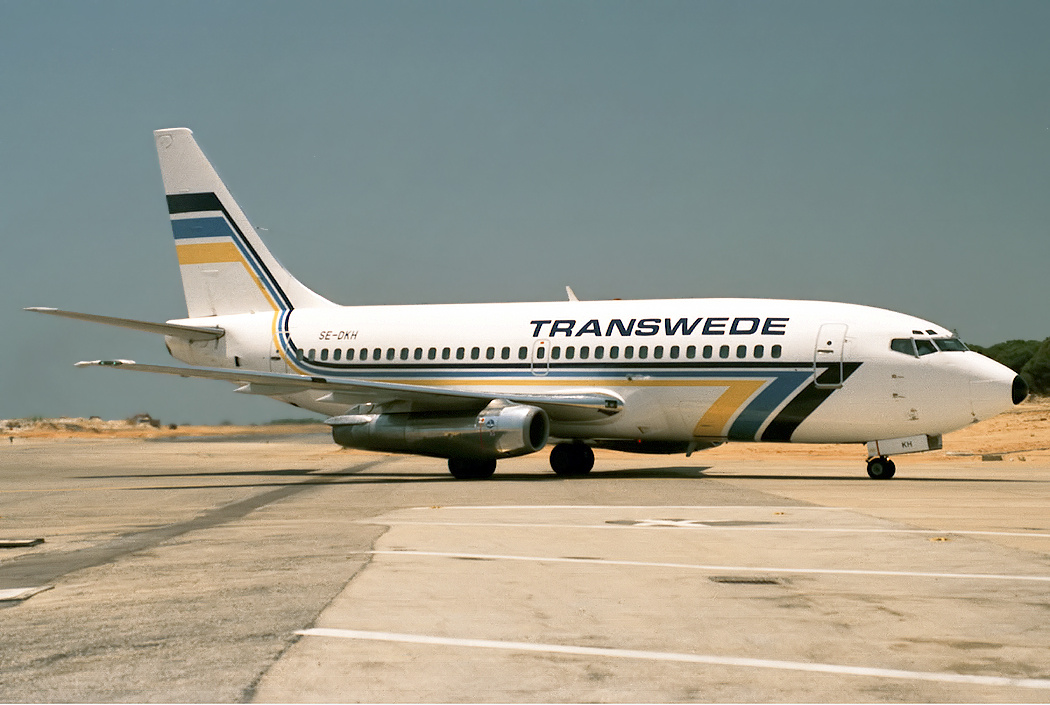
Boeing 737-200 pictured in 1989

=== Scheduled operations ===
At the time Linjeflyg and its parent Scandinavian Airlines System (SAS) controlled virtually all domestic air traffic in Sweden, based on a monopoly granted through a series of government concessions. Transwede started working against this system in 1989, when they applied to operate a direct service from Göteborg Landvetter Airport to Sundsvall Airport and Skellefteå Airport. This would require the airline to buy smaller turboprop aircraft. This did not hinder Linjeflyg and Transwede from cooperating in other areas, with the former wet leasing Caravelles and MD-80s when in need. Transwede also signed an agreement with the Swedish Armed Forces to operate the first domestic charter service in Sweden, twice weekly from Gothenburg to Luleå Airport. They subsequently applied to operate the route as a twice-daily scheduled flight. The airline had a revenue of 800 million kronor in 1989, but failed to make a profit. Chairman Lars Svenheim replaced Thomas Johansson as CEO in May 1990.

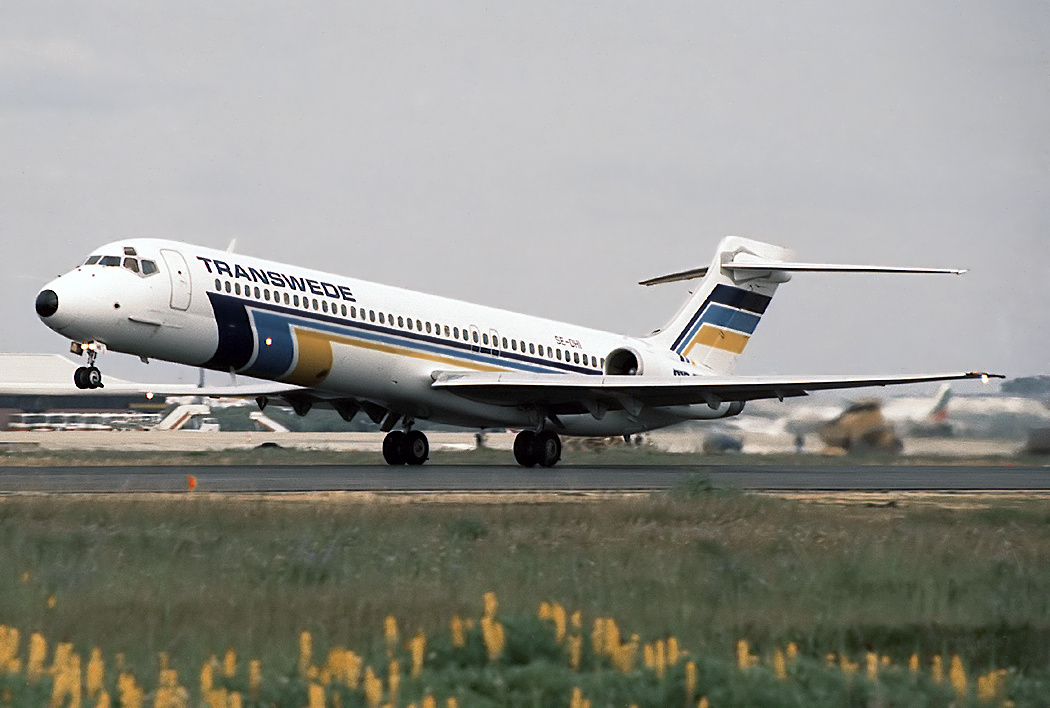
McDonnell Douglas MD-87 at Faro Airport

Transwede applied in June 1990 to operate a scheduled service from Stockholm, Gothenburg and Malmö to London Gatwick Airport. International routes out of Scandinavia had since the 1940s been the domain of Scandinavian Airlines System, but in 1990 the Danish authorities granted domestic carrier Maersk Air the right to start a Gatwick service out of Copenhagen. Transwede used this as leverage to secure itself a similar right out of the Swedish capital. Transwede started the service eight times per week, using a single-class MD-83, offering prices 32 percent below SAS and British Airways.

Meanwhile, Sterling Airways's owner TransNordic Group bought a 33-percent stake in Transwede. They had bought a similar stake in Norway Airlines, who had received concession to operate an Oslo to Gatwick route. In addition to the London routes, the three airlines aimed at starting services on the lucrative "capital triangle" between the three Scandinavian capitals. Within a year Transwede was flying three daily flights to London and had captured a 29-percent market share. The partnership lasted until April 1993.

Transwede's interests shifted in 1992, following the merger between SAS and the main Swedish domestic carrier, Linjeflyg. Due to their concessionary monopolies, the new airline would receive a 97-percent domestic market share. Meanwhile, this opened for deregulation of the domestic air carrier market. The same year Leif Lundin replaced Lars Svenheim as CEO. This only lasted until December, when Lundin was replaced by Christer Petrén.

The airline's first domestic scheduled service commenced on 22 July 1992, between Stockholm and Visby Airport, serving the island of Gotland. This was followed in July with flights from Stockholm to Malmö Airport, on 7 August to Umeå Airport. In August Transwede started an interlining cooperation with Finnair, whereby the two coordinated their timetables and fed passengers into each other's networks.

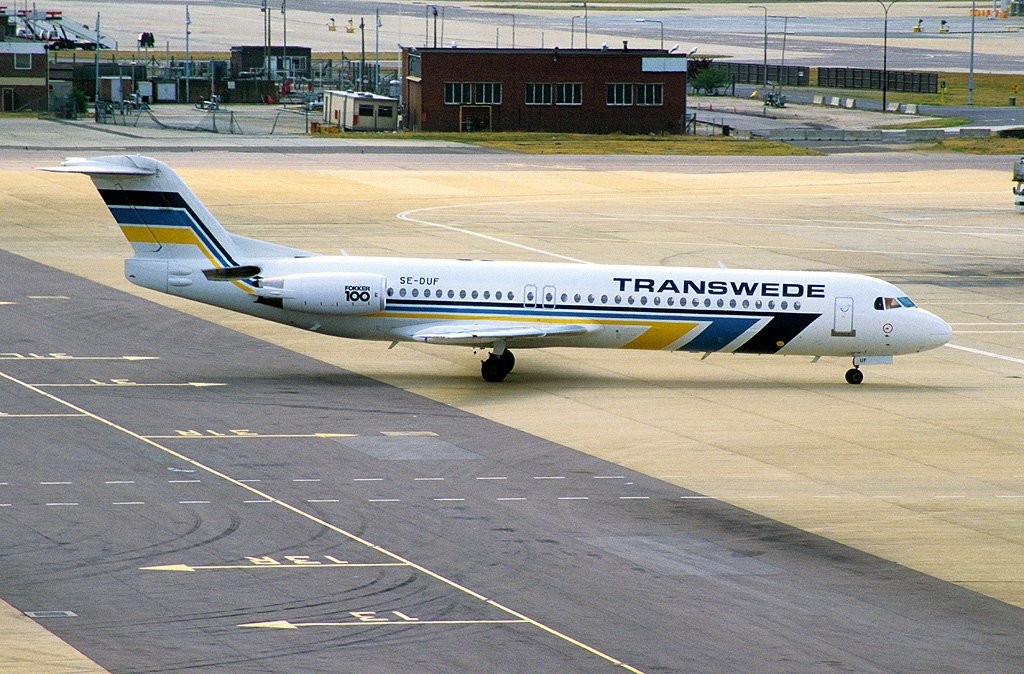
Transwede Fokker 100 at London Gatwick Airport in 1996

The first scheduled route to be terminated took place in October 1992, with the closing of the Visby route. The other main newcomer on the market, Malmö Aviation, gave up its routes from Malmö to London in early 1993, and Transwede took over the concession from April 1993. It followed up on 9 May with commencing a scheduled service from Halmstad Airport to Stockholm, with three daily round trips. Sundsvall to Stockholm commenced services on 19 September. As the airline regarded the MD-80s as too large for domestic services, they leased five 107-seat Fokker 100s, with an option for two more. The options were effectuated to allow Transwede to start services from Stockholm to Jönköping from 25 March 1994. The two MD-87s were subsequently leased out. In order to avoid another competitor on the Jönköping route, Transwede bought the new entrant Falcon Aviation who planned to start that route as well.

Transwede and SAS signed an interlining agreement in February 1994 to allow through tickets to be bought on multi-legged flights with both airlines. Weeks later Transwede announced a cooperation with Lufthansa, whereby the two would provide similar arrangements for flights between Sweden and Germany. For SAS-executive Lars Bergvall replaced Petrén as CEO in late 1994. By the end of 1994, the airline had captured about 30 percent market share on those routes it flew, with a record 36 percent on the Stockholm to Luleå run. Although revenue increased from 1.2 billion kronor in 1993 to 2.0 billion in 1994, the airline ended with a deficit both years of about 300 million. The most costly route was to Malmö, and the airline thus chose to terminate it from January 1995. Meanwhile, the established a route from Umeå to Gällivare Airport, which the subcontracted to Air Nordic using a Fokker F-27.

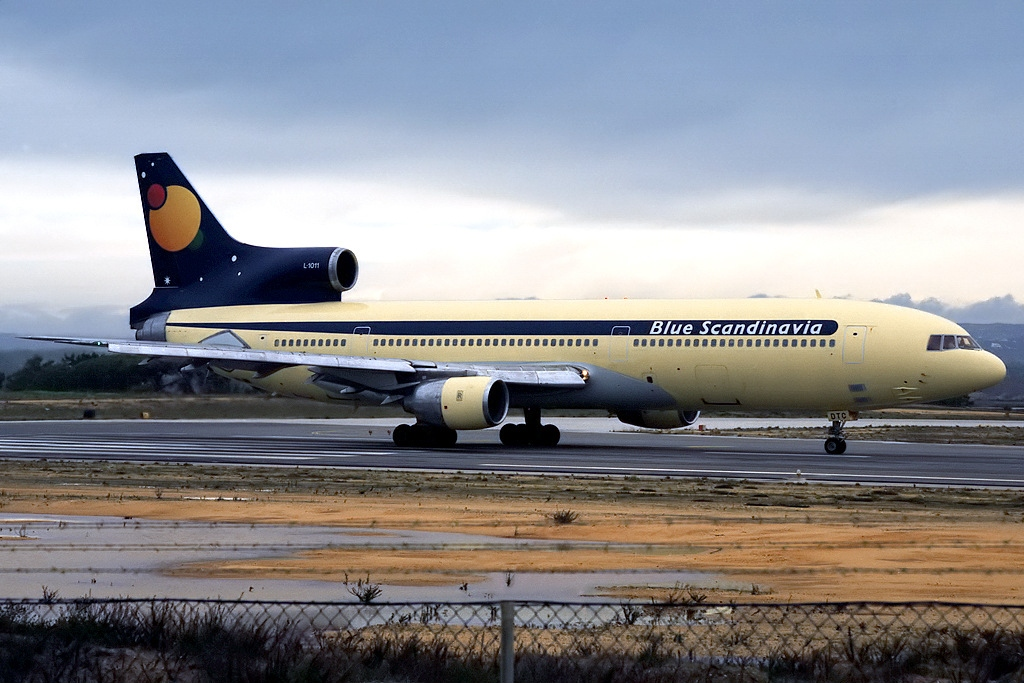
The charter division was spun off and sold to Fritidsresor, taking the name Blue Scandinavia.

=== Splitting up ===
While the airline succeeded at a near break-even on scheduled services, it saw huge losses in the charter market, largely driven by overcapacity in the market. For instance, Transwede lost 100 million kronor in the first five months of 1995. This followed a fleet downsizing that year reducing the airline's charter division to five MD-83s and two MD-87s. Jan Carlzon was hired as chairman in early 1995, and immediately set about to reorganize the airline. It was divided into three business units, which became separate companies. Ownership of the charter division passed to Nordpool, a grouping of inclusive tour operators. The remainder of Transwede was partially bought by Nordic Capital.

Ownership of the charter division, initially named Transwede Leisure, soon passed to the major Swedish tour operator Fritidsresor. The charter airline was subsequently renamed Blue Scandinavia. It was bought by Thomson Travel Group and has since been transformed into TUIfly Nordic.

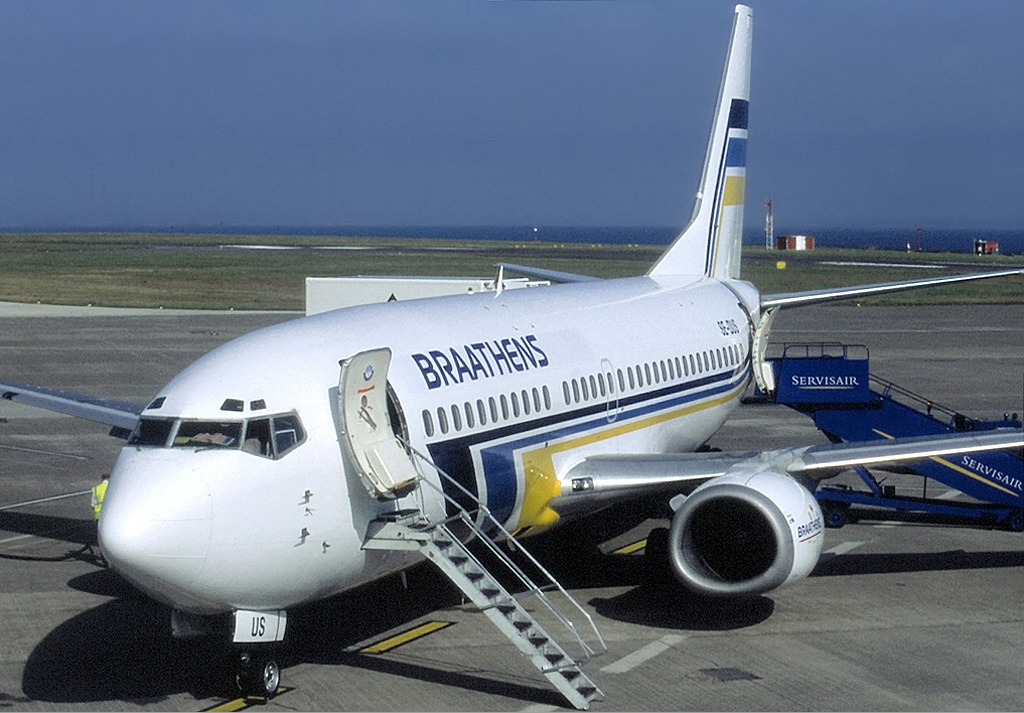
Braathens Boeing 737-300 in hybrid Transwede livery—this was the only -300 operated by Braathens

Braathens SAFE, the largest domestic carrier in Norway, entered negotiations in 1996 to purchase Transwede from its owners, Transpool. The purchase of Transwede was confirmed on 25 June; Braathens SAFE bought 50% of the company's scheduled division, Transwede Airways, with an option to purchase the rest in 1997. The companies planned to integrate their networks, to allow connection between Braathens SAFE's and Transwede flights at Stockholm. Braathens SAFE started flights from their main hub at Oslo Airport, Fornebu to Stockholm on 6 November After three months, the airline had captured 14% of the Oslo–Stockholm market. SAS operated fifteen flights per day, while Braathens only had seven on a route which was regarded as one of SAS' most profitable.

Transwede started replacing its Fokker 100s with Boeing 737-300 in 1997. Braathens SAFE was criticized by the Norwegian Airline Pilots Association because it was using retired Braathens SAFE pilots to fly Transwede aircraft, due to Transwede not having certified pilots for their new Boeing 737-300. Braathens SAFE stated that this was within the rules of the Swedish Civil Aviation Administration and the Joint Aviation Authorities.

Braathens SAFE bought the remaining half of Transwede on 18 December 1997, paying 2 kronor. In addition came 13 million in converted debt. With the take-over, the company changed its name to Braathens Sverige AB. At the same time, management announced that they planned to replace all the company's Fokker 100s with 737-300s.

== Fleet ==
Traswede aircraft
Aircraft	Image	Quantity	Start	End	Ref
Sud Aviation Caravelle	Rear-engined twin turbojet with low wings	3	1985	1990	
McDonnell Douglas MD-83	Rear-engined twin turbojet with low wingsRear-engined twin turbojan with low wings	7	1986	1996	
McDonnell Douglas MD-87	Rear-engined twin turbojet with low wings	2	1989	1994	
Boeing 737-200	Wing-mouned twin turbofan with low wings	2	1989	1990	
Boeing 737-300	Wing-mouned twin turbojeg with low wings	1	1996	1997	
Fokker 100	Rear-engined twin turbojet with low wings	7	1993	1997	

== Destinations ==
The following is a list of scheduled destinations served by Transwede.

Transwede destinations
Location	Airport	Period	Ref
Gällivare	Gällivare Airport	1995–96	
Halmstad	Halmstad Airport	1993–97	
Jönköping	Jönköping Airport	1994–97	
London	London Gatwick Airport	1991–97	
Luleå	Luleå Airport	1993–97	
Malmö	Malmö Airport	1993	
Sundsvall	Sundsvall-Timrå Airport	1993–97	
Stockholm	Stockholm Arlanda Airport	1991–97	
Umeå	Umeå Airport	1993–97	
Visby	Visby Airport	1993	

== Accidents and incidents ==
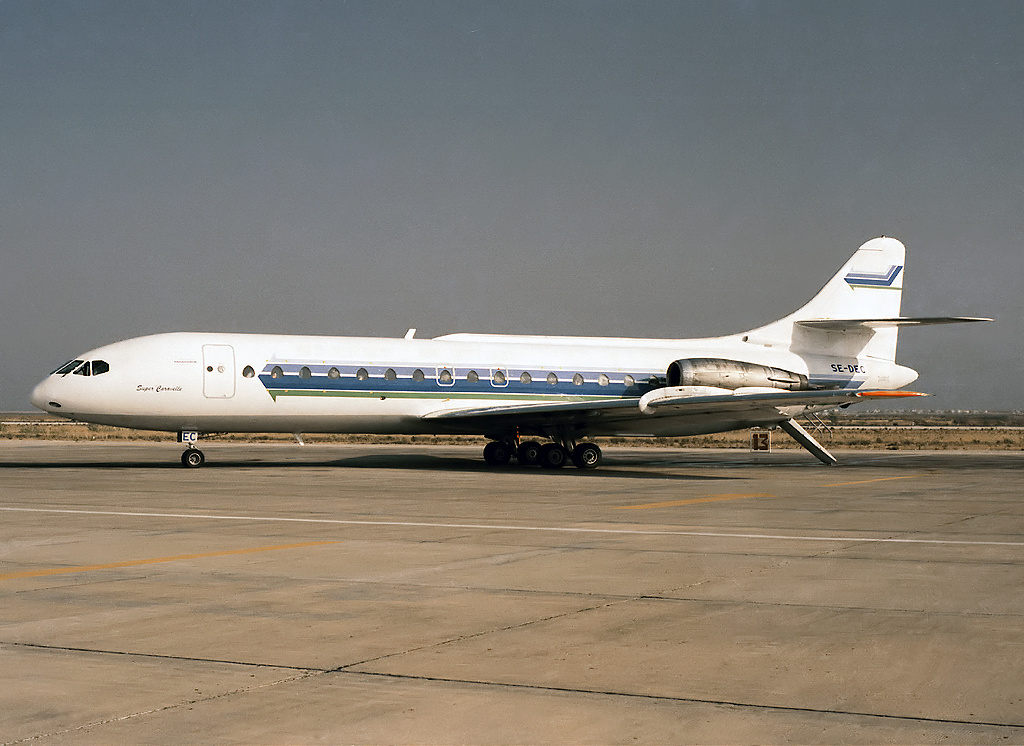
SE-DEC, the aircraft involved in the accident

On 6 January 1987 a Sud Aviation SE-210 Caravelle 10R (SE-DEC) crashed at Stockholm Arlanda Airport. Immediately after take-off, at an altitude of 10 meters (33 ft), a fault with the elevator caused the nose to pitch down and the aircraft to land hard. The aircraft subsequently slid off the runway and bust into fire. The aircraft was damaged beyond repair. None of the six crew members and twenty-one passengers were killed.
