= Barents =

Barents may refer to:

- René Barents (born 1951), Dutch judge and legal scholar
- Willem Barents (c. 1550–1597), Dutch navigator and explorer
- Barents AirLink, a Swedish airline
- Barents Island (Norwegian: Barentsøya), an island in the Svalbard archipelago, part of Norway
- Barents Sea, a part of the Arctic Ocean north of Norway and Russia
  - Barents Region, the land along the coast of the Barents Sea
  - Barents Basin, a sedimentary basin in the Barents Sea
- Barents Euro-Arctic Council, the official body for inter-governmental co-operation in the Barents Region

== See also ==
- Barentsburg, second largest settlement in the Svalbard archipelago
- Barentsjøkulen, a glacier on Barentsøya
