= Barents AirLink =

Swedish airline

IATA	ICAO	Call sign
8N	NKF	NORDFLIGHT
- Founded: 1974
- Ceased operations: 2016 (merged)
- Hubs: Luleå Airport
- Destinations: 3
- Headquarters: Luleå, Sweden

Barents AirLink was a Swedish based airline.

== History ==
It was established as Nordkalottflyg in 1974 and operated scheduled domestic and international services. The name was changed to Barents AirLink in 2006. It was based at Luleå Airport. Barents Air Link (2006-2016) merged into Babcock Scandinavian AirAmbulance.

== Services ==
Barents AirLink does not operate any scheduled services and closed down the company in 2012.

It has previously operated the following scheduled services, all from Luleå:

- Pajala, Sweden (until October 2011).
- Tromsø, Norway (discontinued February 2008).
- Murmansk, Russia (discontinued 2007).

== See also ==
- Airlines
- Transport in Sweden

== Fleet ==
The Barents AirLink fleet consisted of the following aircraft in May 2008:

- BAe Jetstream 32
- Beechcraft Super King Air 200
- Piper PA-31 Navajo/Chieftain
