= Time Air Sweden =

Swedish charter airline

Time Air Sweden AB
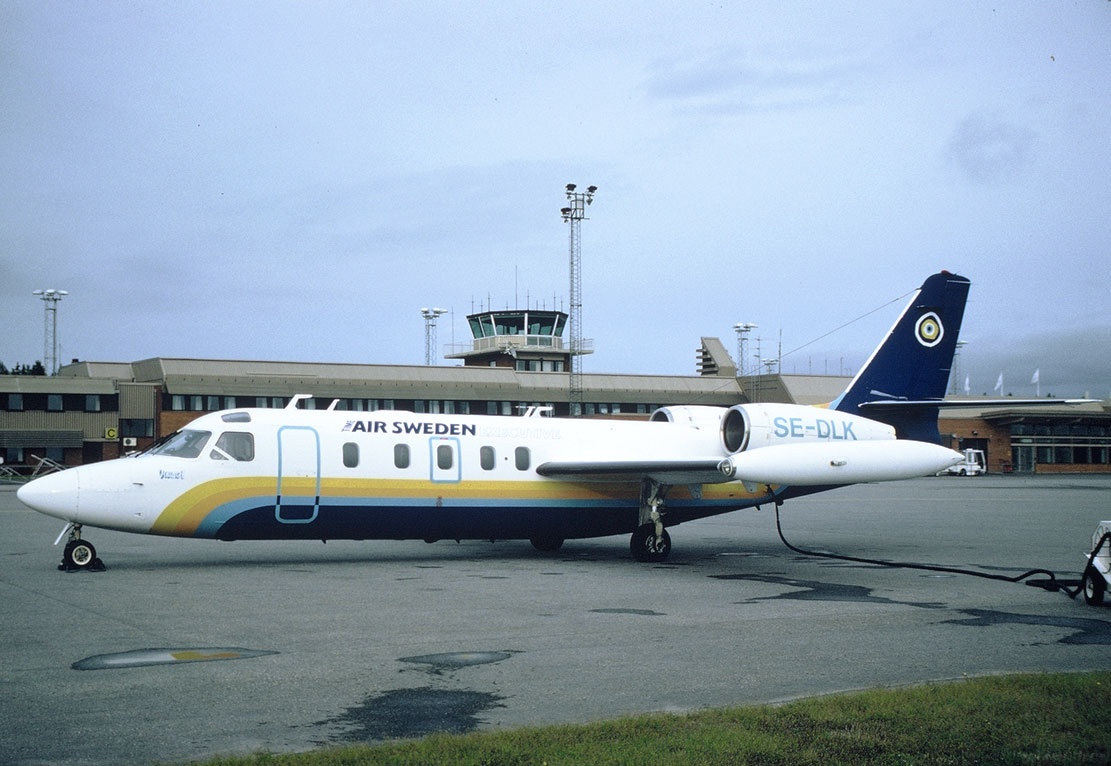
| IATA | ICAO | Call sign |
|---|---|---|
| SL/HK | SDN | AIR SWEDEN |
- Founded: 1991
- Commenced operations: March 1991
- Ceased operations: February 1993
- Hubs: Stockholm-Arlanda Airport
- Fleet size: 7 (upon closure)
- Headquarters: Upplands Väsby
- Key people: Thomas Johansson

Time Air Sweden, also known as Air Sweden, was a short-lived airline from Sweden that operated from 1991 to 1993.

== History ==
The airline was established as LBF-Eda Varken in 1955 and operated taxi flights. It was renamed to Abal Air in 1982 and Time Air Sweden in 1990. Air Sweden was set up as a charter airline because the airline market in Sweden had not yet been deregulated. The airline operated cargo flights with its single Douglas DC-8-71F on the route Ostend-Stockholm-Delhi.

The airline was owned by the Swedish businessman and former owner of Transwede, Thomas Johansson, with the main creditor being GE Capital. When GE Capital canceled the credits in 1993, the airline went bankrupt. This was due to the high losses related to an economic downturn in Sweden, as well as the purchase of two Lockheed L-1011 TriStars.

Parts of the airline were later used to form West Air Sweden, specifically the single IAI Westwind that was left after the first one crashed. There is no connection between Time Air Sweden and the more recent airline Air Sweden.

== Fleet ==
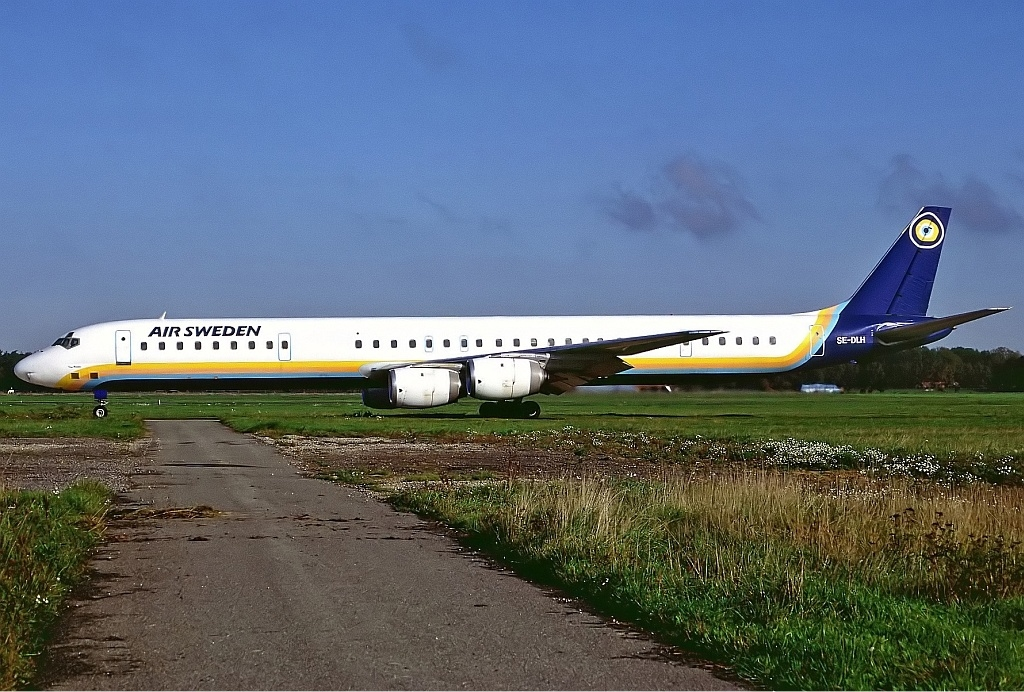
Air Sweden Douglas DC-8-71 at Hannover Airport

Air Sweden fleet
| Aircraft | Number of aircraft | In service | Notes |
|---|---|---|---|
| Boeing 737-200 | 3 | 1991-1992 | Two former Braathens aircraft. Names: Norwegian Rainbow (SE-DLD) and Irish Rainbow (SE-DLP). SE-DKH unnamed. |
| Boeing 737-300 | 3 | 1992-1993 | SE-DLG named Alabama Rainbow. SE-DPN and SE-DPO unnamed. |
| Douglas DC-8-71 | 1 | 1991-1993 | SE-DLH, unnamed. |
| Douglas DC-8-71F | 1 | 1992-1993 | SE-DLM, named Italian Rainbow. |
| Douglas DC-8-73 | 1 | 1992-1993 | F-GDRM, named Texas Rainbow. Leased from AOM French Airlines. |
| IAI Westwind | 2 | 1991-1993 | SE-DLK crashed at Umeå Airport in 1992. SE-DLL was transferred to West Air Sweden when Air Sweden went bankrupt. |
| Lockheed L-1011-100 | 2 | 1993 | SE-DPR (c/n 1231). SE-DPP (c/n 1221), never delivered. |
| Total | 11 | | |

== See also ==
- Airlines
- Transport in Sweden
