= Swe Fly =

Swedish airline

IATA	ICAO	Call sign
WV	SWV	FLYING SWEDE
- Founded: 1994
- Ceased operations: September 2, 2005
- Operating bases: Stockholm Skavsta Airport
- Fleet size: 3
- Destinations: 11
- Headquarters: Nyköping, Sweden
- Key people: Peter Nyblom (CEO)
- Website: www.swefly.com

Swe Fly AB was an independent charter airline based in Nyköping, Sweden.

== History ==
The airline was established in 1994 as WestEastAir, and later renamed Svea Flyg in 1999, operating regional flights within Sweden. It rebranded again to SweFly in 2003 and later acquired a Boeing 767-200ER for long-haul services. Due to financial difficulties, the company ceased flying on September 2, 2005, only months after it began service to the United Kingdom and Pakistan. Swe Fly planned to restart operations in 2006 under a joint venture with low-cost SpiceJet, but plans fell through.

== Destinations ==
Swe Fly operated the following scheduled services as of 2005:

- Domestic destinations: Kalmar, Stockholm, Ronneby and Växjö.
- International destinations: Amsterdam, Copenhagen, Lahore, Leeds, London, and Oslo.

== Fleet ==
Swe Fly consisted of the following aircraft (as of September 2005):

- 1 - Boeing 767-200ER
- 2 - Fokker 50

== See also ==
- List of defunct airlines of Sweden
