= Air Sweden =

Swedish charter airline

Air Sweden Aviation AB
IATA	ICAO	Call sign
–	SNX	SNOWFLAKE
- Founded: 2009
- Ceased operations: 2011
- Operating bases: Stockholm-Arlanda Airport
- Subsidiaries: JE Time Sweden
- Fleet size: 0
- Headquarters: Stockholm, Sweden
- Website: www.airsweden.aero/en/

Air Sweden was a short-lived airline based in Stockholm, Sweden, which operated charter flights out of Stockholm-Arlanda Airport, and worldwide aircraft lease services. The company was founded as the successor of Nordic Airways and received its airline license in December 2009. The airline suspended all operations in September 2011.

== Fleet ==
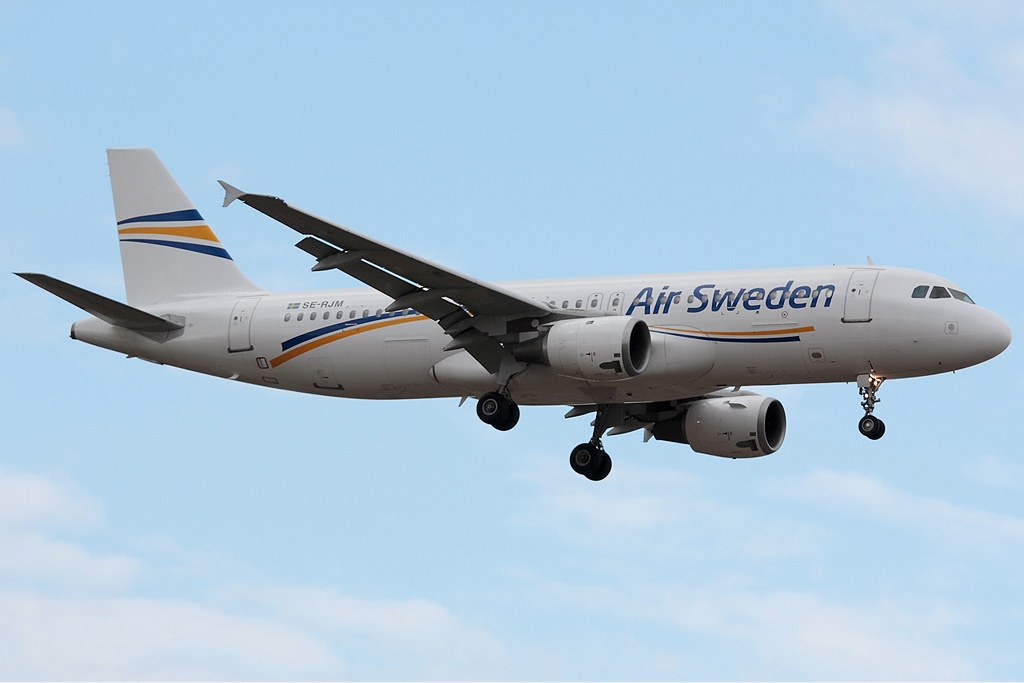
Air Sweden Airbus A320 at Belgrade Nikola Tesla Airport

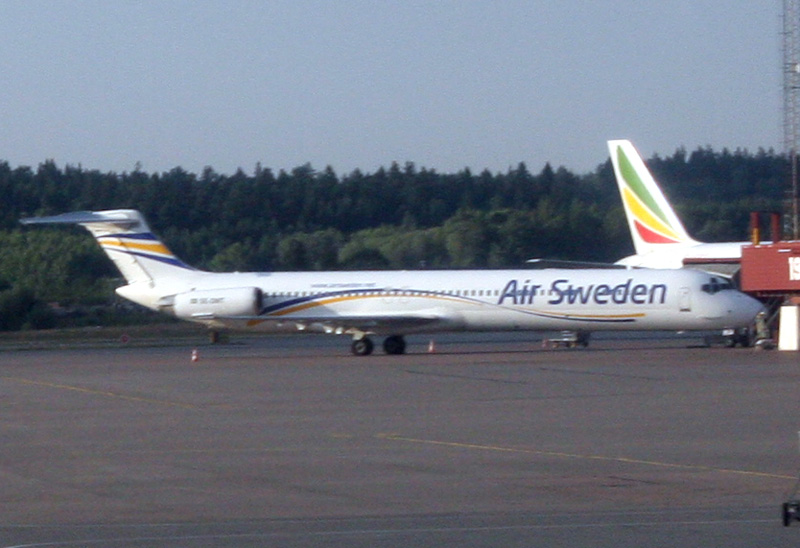
An Air Sweden McDonnell Douglas MD-81 at Stockholm-Arlanda Airport (2010)

Air Sweden fleet
Aircraft	In service	Orders	Passengers	Notes
Piper PA-31 Navajo	1	0	-	Operated by JE Time Sweden
Total	1	0		

== See also ==
- List of airlines of Sweden
