= Nordic European Airlines =

Swedish charter airline

- Nordic European Airlines logo
IATA	ICAO	Call sign
DJ	ELN	NORDIC
- Commenced operations: 1991
- Ceased operations: 1998
- Fleet size: See Fleet below
- Headquarters: Stockholm, Sweden

Nordic European Airlines (IATA: DJ, ICAO: NOD) was a charter airline based Stockholm, Sweden.

== History ==
Nordic East Logo

Nordic European Airlines began its life in 1991 as Nordic East Airways and operated one Douglas DC-9-21 aircraft on charters to the Mediterranean region. In 1992, the airline received two MD-80s but eventually needed aircraft with a longer range. They acquired a Boeing 737-300 and a 737-400, and returned the DC-9s and MD-80s to the leasing companies.

In 1995, Nordic East acquired two Lockheed L-1011s from Cathay Pacific and expanded its charter work with those and a third aircraft that was added later. Business comprised sub-charter duties for other carriers like the German airline LTU.

The airline changed its name to Nordic European Airlines - NEA at the end of 1996, but by the next year the airline was in financial difficulties. Operations were suspended in March 1998, with the international business of the airline in receivership.

== Fleet ==
- Douglas DC-9-21
- Douglas DC-9-41
- McDonnell Douglas MD-82
- McDonnell Douglas MD-83
- Boeing 737-291
- Boeing 737-3Q8
- Boeing 737-4Y0
- Lockheed L-1011-500 TriStar
