= SAS Commuter =

Swedish regional airline

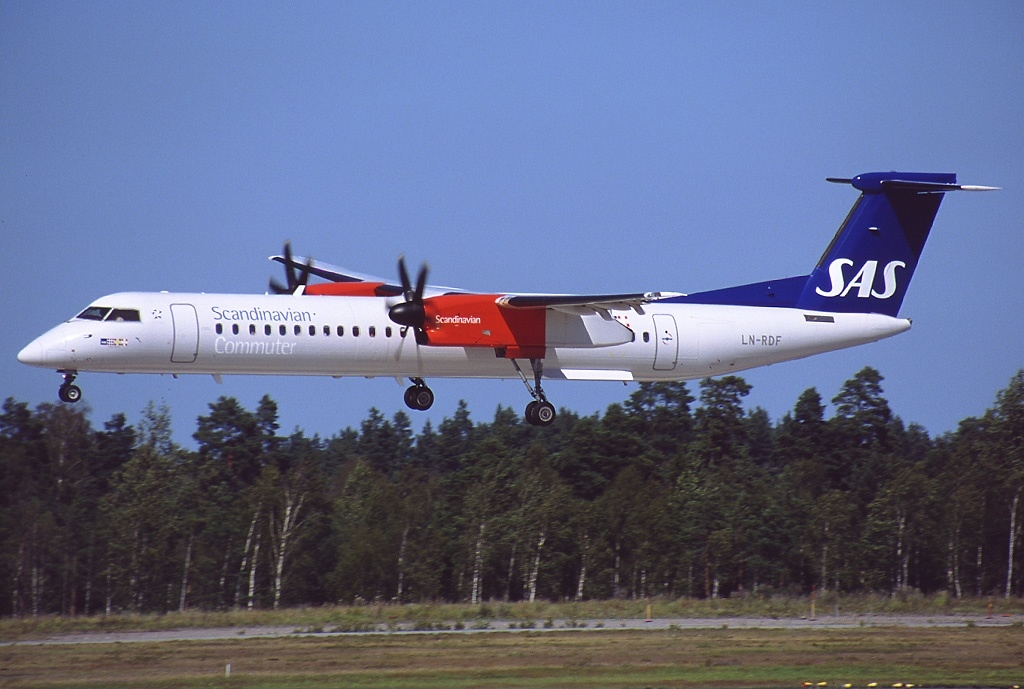
- Dash-8-Q400
IATA	ICAO	Call sign
SK	SAS	SCANDINAVIAN
- Founded: 1988
- Ceased operations: 1 October 2004
- Operating bases: Bergen; Copenhagen; Stockholm-Arlanda; Tromsø; Trondheim
- Frequent-flyer program: EuroBonus
- Alliance: Star Alliance
- Fleet size: 33 (2004)
- Parent company: SAS Group
- Headquarters: Kastrup, Tårnby Municipality, Denmark
- Key people: Kristian Kircheiner (Managing Director)

SAS Commuter, also branded Scandinavian Commuter, was a regional airline which operated in Denmark, Norway and Sweden. A sister company of Scandinavian Airlines (SAS), it operated regional services on behalf of the Scandinavian flag carrier. The airline was headquartered at Copenhagen Airport, which also served as its main base. It later also operated bases at Tromsø Airport; Stockholm Arlanda Airport; Trondheim Airport, Værnes and Bergen Airport, Flesland.

Established in 1984 as a SAS business unit, it initially flew regional routes out of Copenhagen using a fleet of nine Fokker F27 Friendships. Twenty-two Fokker 50s were delivered in 1989 and 1990. They operated out of Copenhagen with Eurolink brand, as well as taking over regional services in Northern Norway from May 1990 under Norlink brand. Starting in February 1997, SAS Commuter took delivery of six Saab 2000, with which operated with the Swelink brand. They served domestic and secondary Finnish destinations out of Stockholm.

SAS Commuter became the launch customer of the Bombardier Dash 8-Q400 in January 2000, which over the next two years replaced the Eurolink Fokkers and the Saabs. The Q400 were initially plagued by technical faults. In 2002 Norlink operations were transferred to sister company Widerøe. However, from April 2003 SAS Commuter took over former Braathens routes in Western Norway, operated under the Westlink brand. SAS Commuter was dissolved on 1 October 2004 and integrated into the main air carrier.

== History ==
=== The beginning ===
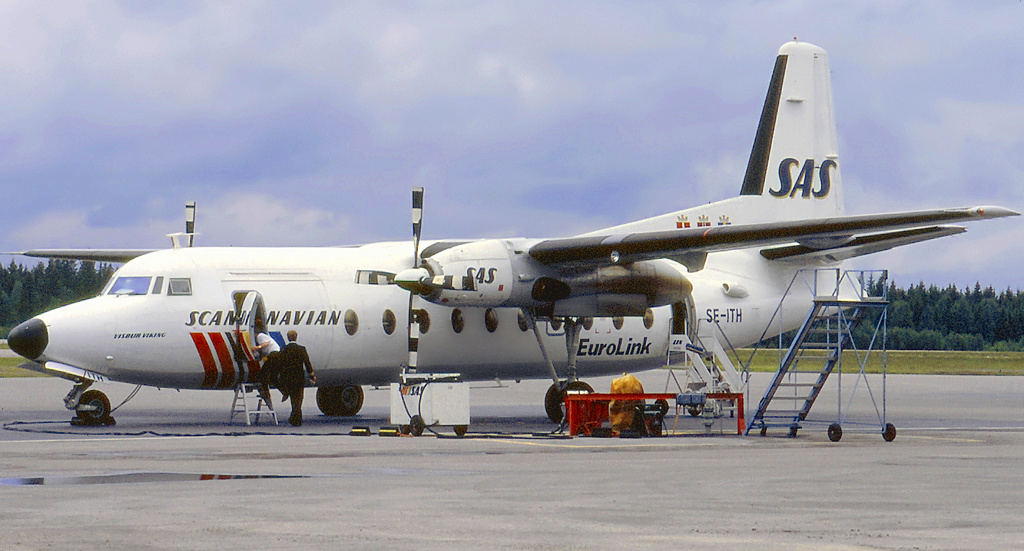
A Fokker F27-600 Friendship at Stockholm Arlanda Airport in 1987

Following the retirement of the Convair Metropolitan in 1976, SAS operated an all-jetliner fleet. Although it is the designated flag carrier for the three Scandinavian countries, each country has allowed domestic airlines to operate a significant portion of the domestic services. By the 1980s the smallest aircraft in SAS' fleet is the Douglas DC-9, which is too large for some services. Discussions were carried out in 1983 to create a dedicated domestic airline for Sweden, which would see a merger between among others SAS' domestic operations, Linjeflyg and Swedair but no agreement could be reached.

SAS therefore decided to subcontract the operation of some of its international and domestic services to Busy Bee and Swedair, starting in 1982. Most of these were international services out of Copenhagen, as well as domestic routes in Sweden. The move was met with fierce opposition from the pilot unions, which threatened to "boycott" the decision by continuing to land aircraft on the former routes. For instance, services from Copenhagen to Kristiansand Airport, Kjevik and Bergen Airport, Flesland had previously been operated as a two-legs flight. With smaller aircraft, both could be operated as nonstop services.

After pressure from the pilot unions, on 7 March 1984 SAS decided to establish a dedicated business unit. It would operate regional airliners and have its own crew. The aircraft would otherwise be painted in accordance with SAS livery and branding. SAS terminated its agreements with Busy Bee and Swedair prematurely in order to insource the operations.

Nine Fokker F27s were bought, four from Trans Australia Airlines for $9.5 million. Services commenced on 14 December 1984 with the first four aircraft branded Eurolink and operating short hauls out of Copenhagen Airport. Initially routes to Oslo Airport, Fornebu, Göteborg Landvetter Airport, Haugesund Airport, Karmøy, Kristiansand Airport, Kjevik, Jönköping Airport and Hamburg Airport made up the network. The service to Hamburg was by far the busiest, with five to seven daily ones. The old aircraft, built between 1967 and 1969, were unpopular with the customers because of low comfort, high noise levels and many technical problems. Customers would often complain when they realized they would have to travel with a F27 rather than a DC-9. A further five F27 were bought from Aero Trasporti Italiani in 1985, costing 70 million Swedish kronor (SEK).

=== Fokker 50 ===
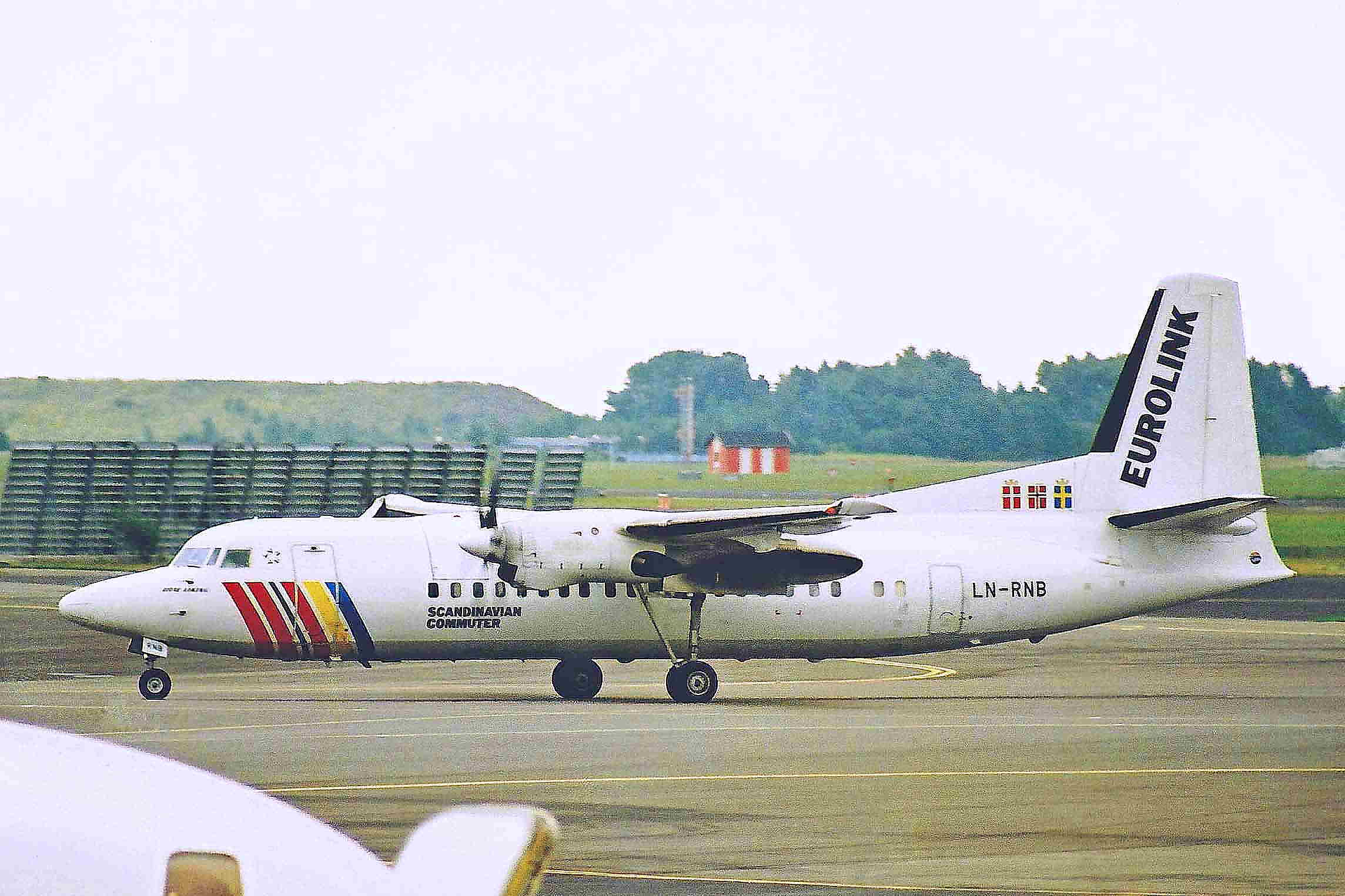
Eurolink Fokker 50 at Copenhagen Airport in 2000

SAS announced in October 1986 that they intended to replace their commuter fleet with a newer aircraft type. The SAS Group's three owner companies—Aerotransport, Danish Air Lines and Norwegian Air Lines—decided in May 1988 to split the SAS Group into three consortia. Essentially the charter operator Scanair and SAS Commuter were split out into separate companies which became sisters of the SAS Group, owned in the tradition 3:2:2 ratio. This took effect in 1989. SAS Commuter was fully registered in September 1989.

The airline settled on ordering twenty-two Fokker 50s. By then the airline had decided to introduce two succinct brands, a continuation of the Eurolink operations out of Copenhagen and a Norlink brand to be used in Northern Norway. The aircraft received slightly different configurations, with the Eurolink aircraft having 46 seats to accommodate EuroClass, SAS' business class. The Norlink aircraft were all-economy and had seating for 50 passengers. Delivery of the first twenty aircraft took place between September 1989 and November 1990, with the last two being handed over in May 1991. By 1991 SAS Commuter was making a profit of SEK 58 million in 1991.

=== Norlink ===
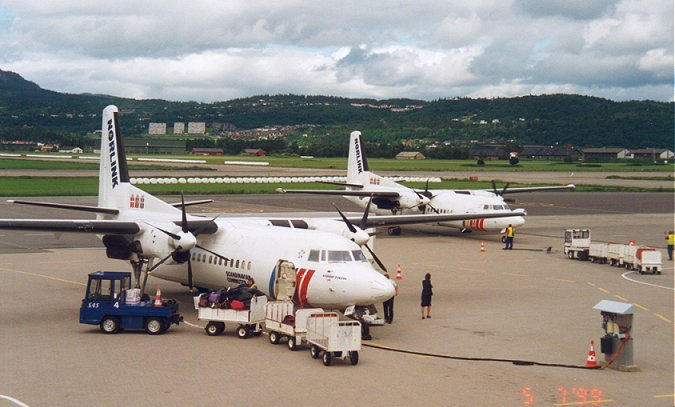
Two Fokker 50s in Norlink colors at Trondheim Airport, Værnes in 1999

SAS' traditional route model in Northern Norway consisted of operating DC-9s and later McDonnell Douglas MD-80s to Tromsø Airport and then continuing onwards to a combination of Alta Airport; Lakselv Airport, Banak and Kirkenes Airport, Høybuktmoen. SAS was flying what they considered local routes with DC-9s, others were flown at high costs by Widerøe using de Havilland Canada Dash 7s.

SAS announced in September 1988 that it intended to change this model. DC-9s and MD-80s would fly nonstop from Oslo to Alta, and then a hub and spoke system would be established by SAS Commuter whereby they would feed into the Alta, which was designated as hub. This led to increase frequency on some of the feeder routes, for instance from three to six on the Tromsø to Alta service and Kirkenes going from two to five daily services. Also Bardufoss Airport lost its direct service and was instead fed into Bodø. Seven Fokker 50s were reserved for Norlink, which also took over all SAS flights operating between airports from Trondheim Airport, Værnes and northwards. For instance, a F50 used 650 kilograms (1,430 lb) of fuel from Tromsø to Kirkenes, compared to 2.2 tonnes used by a DC-9. Overall, SAS hoped to save NOK 60 million per year on the new network. A route from Tromsø to Murmansk Airport in Russia was also introduced.

SAS Commuter chose to locate its Norlink base at Tromsø Airport. This caused other airlines in Northern Norway to lose significant numbers of pilots to SAS, as the airline could offer higher wages than the other regional airlines in the region.

Operations commenced on 7 May 1990. Early operations were plagued with problems, which often caused the entire operation to collapse throughout the day. The Fokker 50s were prone to various faults, often grounding them. This was exasperated by a lack of mechanics and spare parts. SAS had not been able to train sufficient captains in time, which caused additional services to be terminated. Added to this was insufficient turn-around time for the aircraft at the airports, especially in Alta were four aircraft were to operate simultaneously. The increased number of transferring passengers made the system less robust for delays. SAS cut eleven daily services in January 1991, and followed up with a further seventeen —a twenty percent reduction—in October. The airline cited a decline in patronage and an annual loss in Norlink alone of NOK 56 million.

Negotiations were started between SAS and Braathens SAFE in late 1991 concerning a merger of the two group's regional airlines in Norway. In what was proposed to be called Norwegian Commuter, Norlink and Busy Bee would pool their regional operations. There were proposals for a full-out merger, or a mere pooling where the two existing companies wet lease services to the new company. Uncertainty related to the deregulation of the industry caused the merger to be abandoned.

From October 1992 two of the Fokkers were transferred from Norlink to Eurolink. This was in part due to the Norwegian Armed Forces going over to buying commercial flights and thus more direct services with DC-9s and MD-80s. From then SAS Commuter needed only four aircraft in revenue service, with the fifth being a reserve. By the end of 1992, SAS estimated they had lost NOK 250 million on Norlink in isolation, although the commuter services generated significant profitable revenue for the jetliner routes. Later SAS Commuter established a technical and operations base at Trondheim Airport, Værnes. SAS Commuter pulled out of the routes from Harstad/Narvik Airport, Evenes to Tromsø and Bodø, as well as the route between Tromsø and Lakselv from 1997. These routes were going with a loss and were instead made subject to public service obligations.

=== Swelink ===
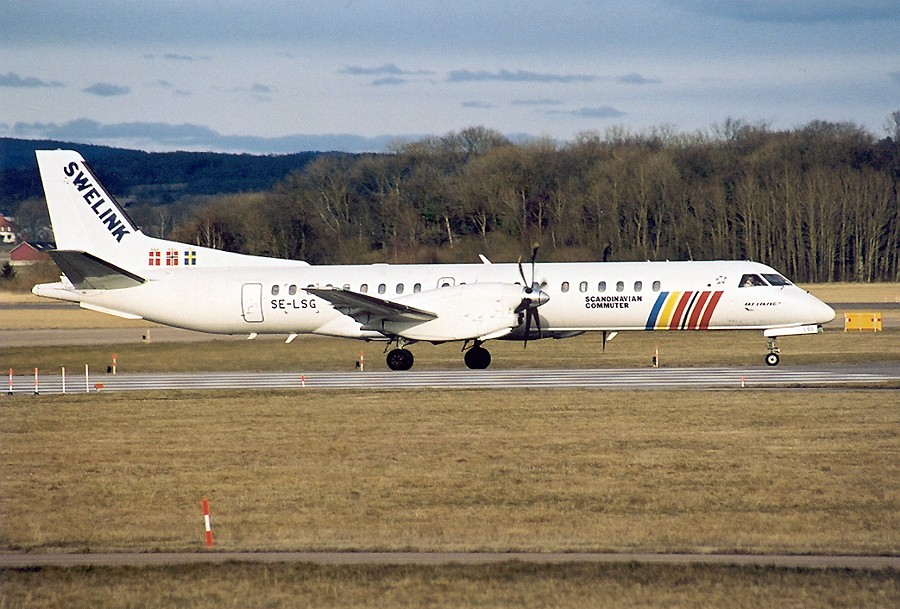
Swelink Saab 2000 at Ängelholm–Helsingborg Airport

SAS bought Swedair in 1993, but allowed it to enter receivership in 1994. Meanwhile, SAS was working on a major fleet replacement project to replace its Fokker F28 Fellowships with larger Boeing 737s. This would raise the size of the smallest jetliners from 80 to 120 passengers, too large for many of the smallest routes. SAS therefore started planning on expanding the SAS Commuter operations to Sweden.

SAS Commuter announced on 30 July 1996 the order of four Saab 2000s, later increased to six. These would be part of a new division, Swelink, which would operate out of Stockholm Arlanda Airport. The first two aircraft were delivered in February 1997, with the next two arriving in April. The final two were handed over in January and March 1998. The main area of operation were smaller domestic services out of Arlanda, Kalmar, Karlstad, Kristianstad, Ronneby, Skellefteå and Växjö. The aircraft were also occasionally used on the route to Gothenburg. Swelink was also used on three secondary routes to Finland, to Tampere, Turku and Vaasa.

=== Q400 ===
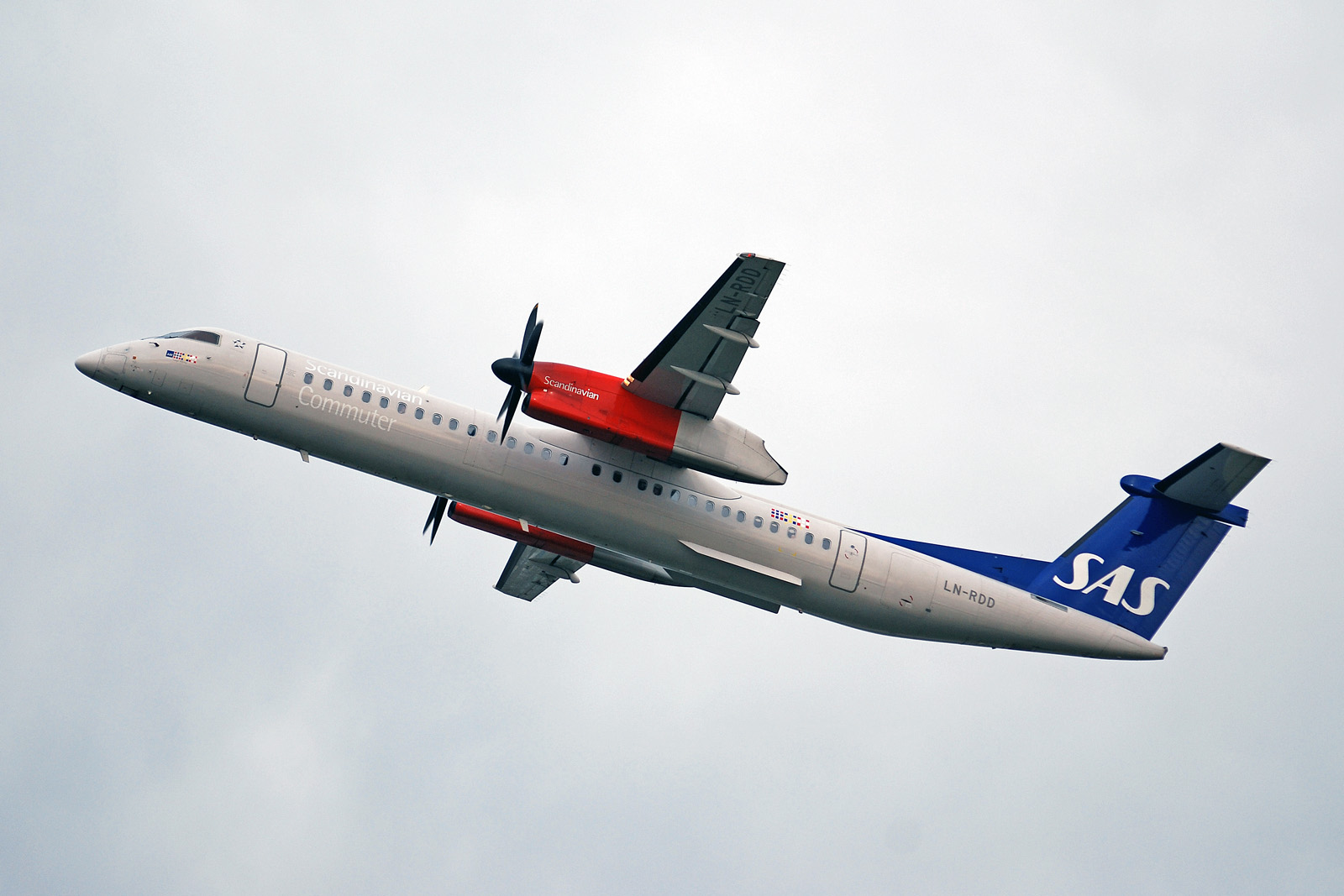
A Dash 8-Q402

The order for 15 Bombardier Dash 8-Q400 and a further option for 18 more was signed on 26 August 1997. SAS Commuter later executed 13 of the options. The Q400s were planned to and would ultimately replace the entire Saab 2000 fleet of Swelink and the Fokker 50 fleet of Eurolink. However, Norlink retained use of Fokker 50 aircraft. The first Q400 was delivered on 18 January 2000 and entered traffic on 7 February.

As the launch customer of extended Q400, SAS was prone to many of the early faults with the aircraft type. Aviation historian Åke Hall stated that it was the aircraft type which SAS has had the most challenges with throughout its history. First of all the production was delayed and by May only four of eleven planned deliveries had been made. One issue was false alarms created by the cockpit software, while oil leaks caused for engines to have to be replaced. By October there had been nine emergency landings caused by various technical faults, and SAS Commuter chose to ground the aircraft for several days. Deliveries came to a halt that month as the eleven first aircraft were all having faults caused by the same defects. Delivery of further aircraft resumed in February 2001. As the various issues were resolved, the aircraft entered a more normal mode of operation. The 28th aircraft was delivered in 2002.

=== Westlink ===
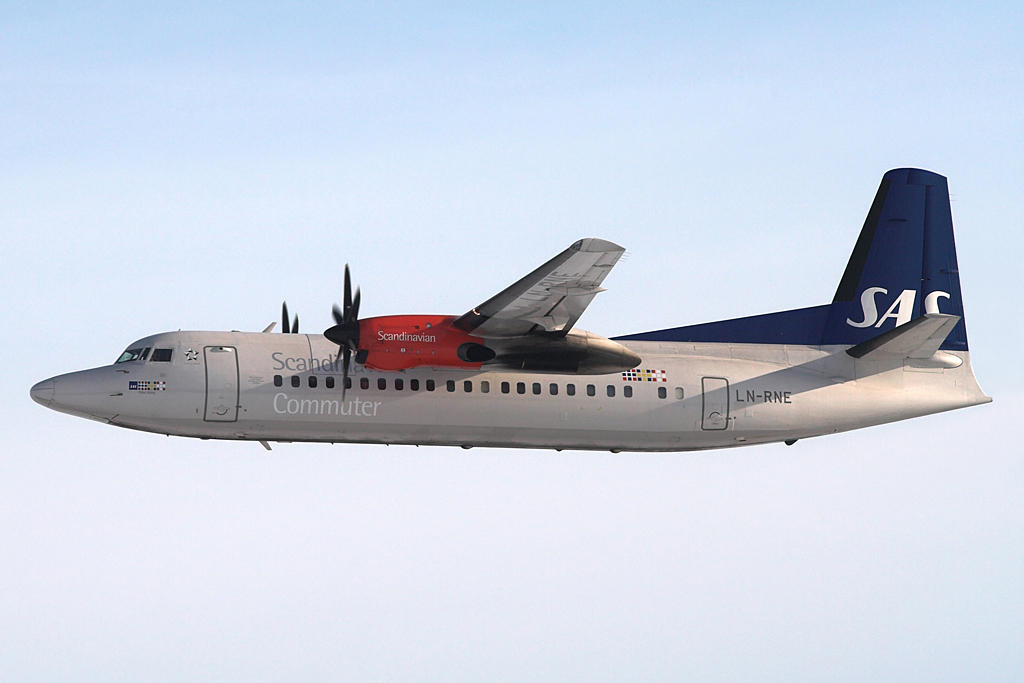
Westlink Fokker 50

Following a period of intense price war and huge losses, the SAS Group was given permission to buy its main domestic competitor Braathens in late 2001. After having been a substantial owner since 1997, the SAS Group took full ownership of Norwegian regional carrier Widerøe in May 2002. Braathens' regional services in Western Norway were at the time operated by the subcarrier Norwegian Air Shuttle. SAS announced in 2002 that it intended that these route be taken over by SAS Commuter, while the Norlink services would be operated by Widerøe, where the latter already had a major presence. The latter took effect in October 2002. After Norwegian relaunched themselves as a low-cost carrier in September 2002, they were eager to rid themselves of regional routes. SAS therefore agreed to pay Norwegian NOK 65 million cash to terminate the routes from 1 April 2003.

Westlink consisted of about fifty daily services along the coast between Kristiansand and Trondheim. The switch involved closing down the base in Tromsø and establishing a new main base for Westlink at Bergen Airport, Flesland.

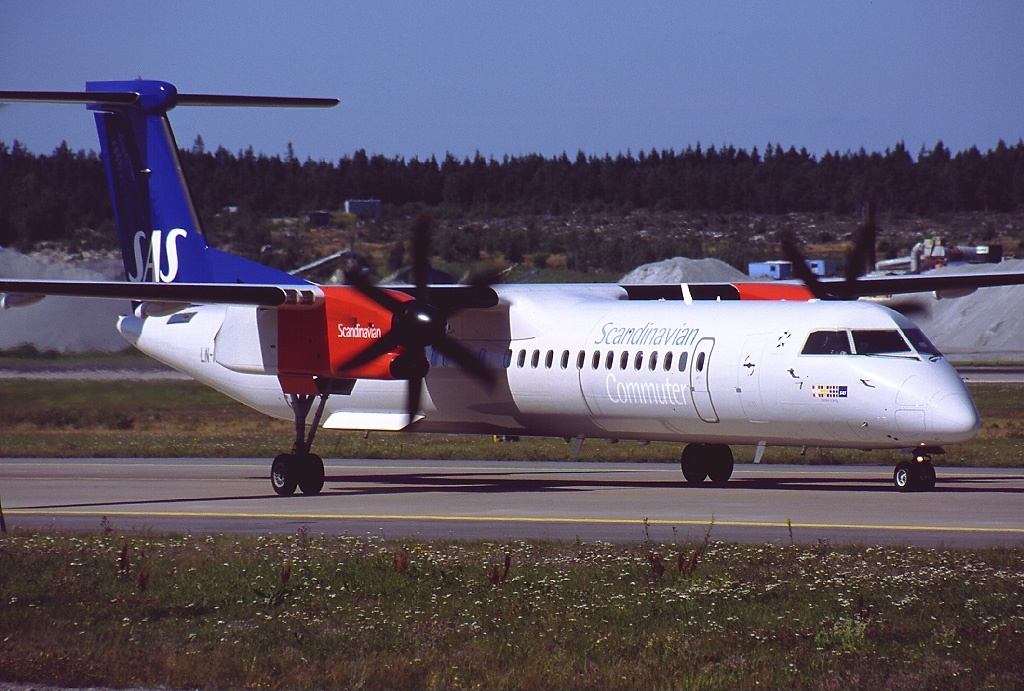
DHC-8-402Q at Stockholm Arlanda Airport in 2002

Widerøe, who have lower wage costs and economies of scale derived from other regional operation in Norway, had planned the take-over of the Westlink routes in the mid-2000s. This had however been canceled after an employee at the SAS Group, not knowing about Widerøe's plans, had renewed the lease of the Fokker 50s for another five years.

=== Disestablishment ===
In its last full year of operation, 2003, SAS Commuter had a revenue of SEK 2.5 billion, making a loss of between 100 and 200 million. The SAS Group decided in May 2004 to terminate SAS Commuter as a separate company. The reason was that the airline was restructuring itself. In Norway, SAS' operations would merge with Braathens to create SAS Braathens, which would also envelop the Westlink services and inherit the Fokker 50s. Similar national operating companies were established for Denmark and Sweden. SAS stated that the utility of having SAS Commuter was lower operating costs than Scandinavian Airlines, but that restructuring had caused these discrepancies to dissipate. The last flight took place on 1 October 2004.

== Fleet ==
At the time the airline was merged into the national airlines, it had the following fleet

SAS Commuter aircraft
Aircraft	Image	Quantity	Pax	Start	End	Ref(s).
Fokker F27 Friendship	Twin turboprop with high wings	9	40	1984	1990	
Fokker 50	Twin turboprop with high wings	22	46–50	1990	2004	
Saab 2000	Twin turboprop with low wings	7	49	1997	2001	
Bombardier Dash-8-Q400	Twin turboprop with high wings	28	72–76	2000	2004	

== Bibliography ==
- Hall, Åke (2002). Luftens Vikingar – en bok om SAS alla flygplan (in Swedish). Nässjö: Air Historic Research. ISBN 91-973892-3-4.
- Trumpy, Jacob (2012). Høyt spill (in Norwegian). Oslo: Kagge Forlag. ISBN 978-82-489-1190-6.
