= Swedair =

1968–1994 airline in Sweden

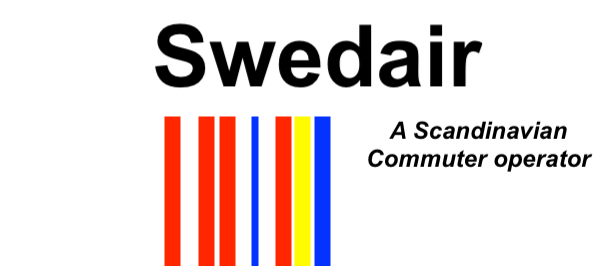
IATA	ICAO	Call sign
JG	SWE	SWEDAIR
- Commenced operations: 1934
- Ceased operations: 2004
- Parent company: SAS Airlines
- Key people: Tor Eliasson

Swedair AB was a Swedish regional airline that existed from 1935 to 1994. It was founded as Svensk Flygtjänst AB by Tor Eliasson, who was CEO until his death in 1971. The company's last managing director was Lars Svanstrom.

== History ==
Crownair Swedish Ltd AB formed in 1968, state in 1969 and with Linjeflyg as half owner since 1971 bought 1975 Svensk Flygtjänst AB formed in 1935 by Tor Eliasson and then changed its name to Swedair. In 1976 the name Swedair AB was adopted.

When the business was the largest in the mid-1980s, it operated 50 aircraft of various types. The taxi flight took place with two-engine Cessna, type 402, 404, 425 Corsair, 441 Conquest and in the subsidiary Basair with Learjet 35. The target flight used MU-2 and Learjet and in Vidsel three Lansen. A Douglas DC-3 was used for the CAA's control of ILS facilities. The regular flight was conducted during the 1970s with DHC-6 Twin Otter on its own lines and later for Line flight and SAS. From the mid-1980s own traffic Örebro-Kastrup with BAe Jetstream 31 and traffic in Norrland with Fokker F27 for SAS Commuters' predecessor COD.

The major upswing in Swedair's regular traffic took place in December 1984, when the first copy of a total of 13 Saab 340s was put into service. The traffic was to a large extent commissioned for Linjeflyg and SAS in Scandinavia and Finland and Poland. For two years in the early 1990s, a Saab 340 flew between Berlin / Tempelhof and Brussels for Sabena. And last year, for a few months East Midlands-Brussels for British Midland and Cardiff-Paris / Charles de Gaulle for Manx Airlines.

Operations with Saab 340 were conducted with very high aviation safety. During 10 years of traffic with more than 10 aircraft, which flew everyday from 6 in the morning to 23 in the evening with a couple of hours of stops in the afternoon and reduced traffic Saturday / Sunday, only two incidents happened. Both took place during the winter in a blizzard when in both cases one of the main wheels came off the runway, but got back on the runway without any damage to the aircraft or passengers.

SAS bought Swedair in 1993, but allowed it to enter receivership in 1994. Meanwhile, SAS was working on a major fleet replacement project to replace its Fokker F28 Fellowships with larger Boeing 737s. This would raise the size of the smallest jetliners from 80 to 120 passengers, too large for many of the smallest routes. SAS therefore started planning on expanding the SAS Commuter operations to Sweden.

SAS Commuter announced on 30 July 1996 the order of four Saab 2000s, later increased to six. These would be part of a new division, Swelink, which would operate out of Stockholm Arlanda Airport. The first two aircraft were delivered in February 1997, with the next two arriving in April. The final two were handed over in January and March 1998. The main area of operation were smaller domestic services out of Arlanda, Kalmar, Karlstad, Kristianstad, Ronneby, Skellefteå and Växjö. The aircraft were also occasionally used on the route to Gothenburg. Swelink was also used on three secondary routes to Finland, to Tampere, Turku and Vaasa. The last Director in swedair AB was Lars svanström.

== Fleet ==
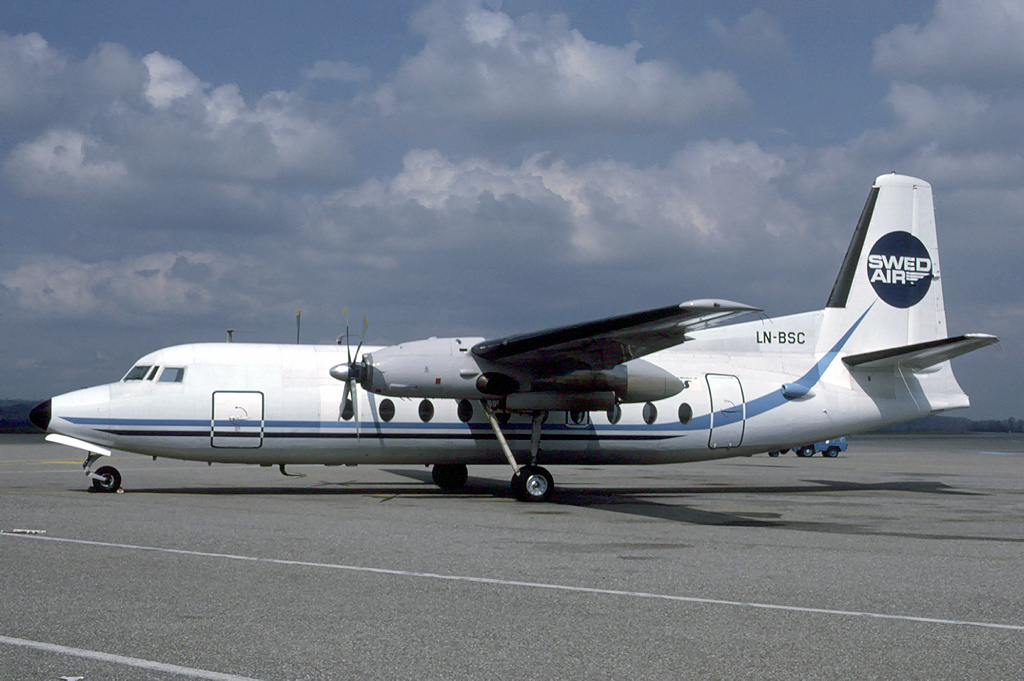
A Fokker F-27

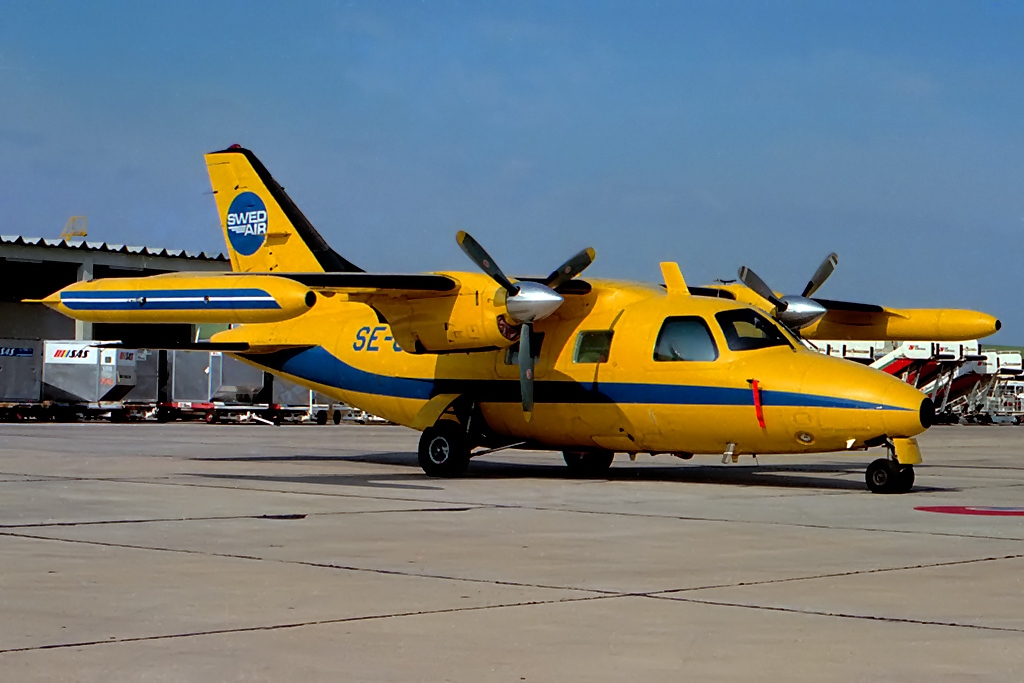
A Mitsubishi MU-2B-25

This was the Swedair fleet for its existence

- Cessna 402
- Cessna 404
- Cessna 425 Corsair
- Learjet 35
- Mitsubishi MU-2
- Douglas DC-3
- de Havilland Canada DHC-6 Twin Otter
- Fokker F-27
- Saab 340
- Saab 2000
- Boeing 737
- BAe Jetstream 31

== See also ==
- Airlines
- Transport in Sweden
