= Kristianstad Österlen Airport =

Airport in Sweden

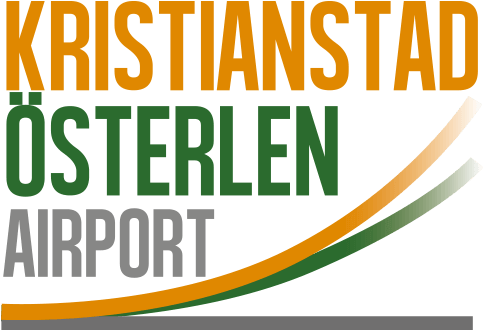

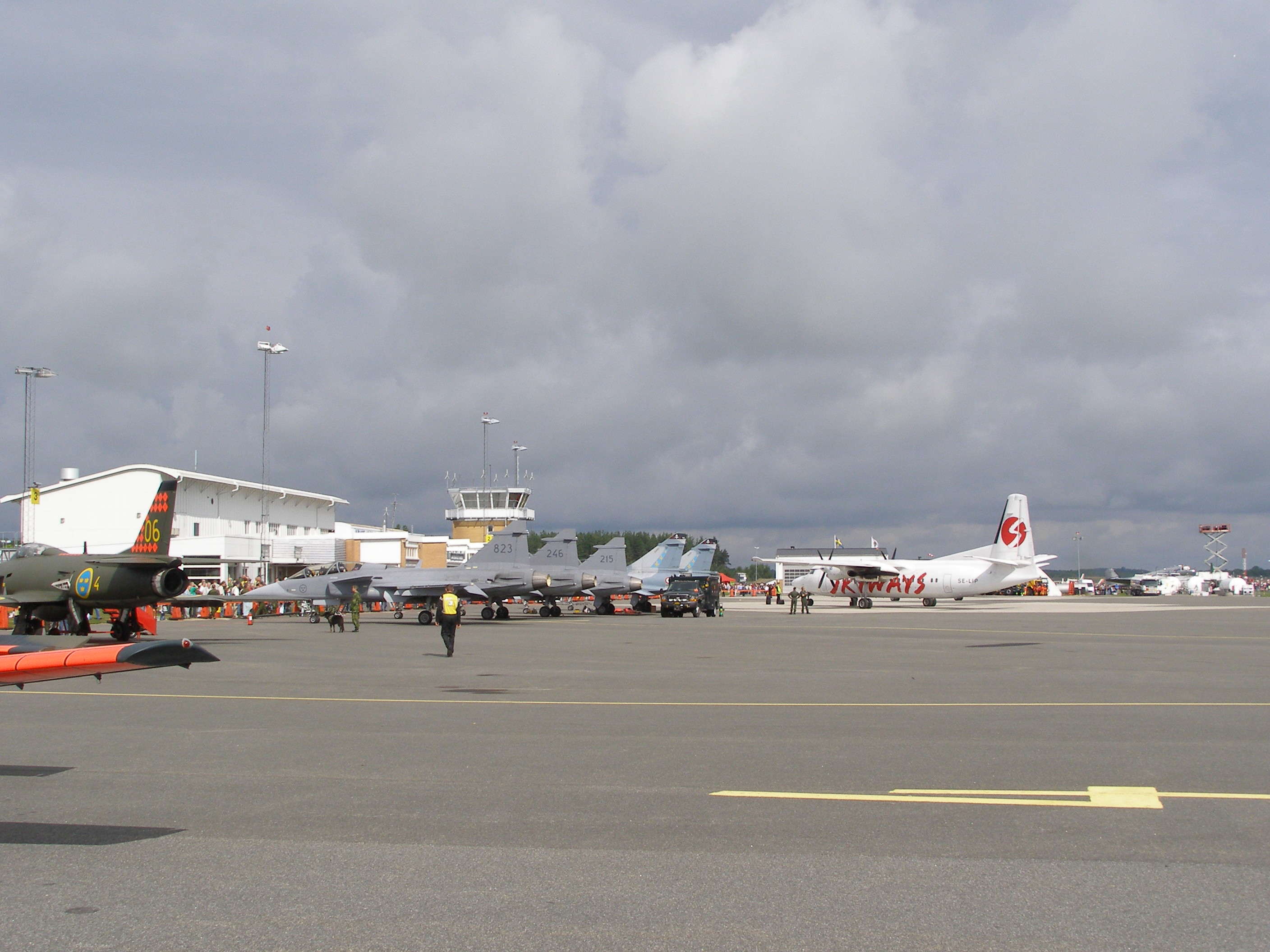
- IATA: KID; ICAO: ESMK

Summary
- Airport type: Public
- Operator: Kristianstad Airport AB
- Serves: Kristianstad, Sweden
- Elevation AMSL: 77 ft (23 m)
- Coordinates: 55°54′43″N 014°05′00″E

Map
- Location of the airport in Sweden

Runways
Direction	Length		Surface
Direction	m	ft	Surface
01/19	2,215	7,267	Asphalt

Statistics (2023)
- Passengers total: 16,236
- International passengers: 165
- Domestic passengers: 16,071
- Landings total: 2,250

Kristianstad Österlen Airport (IATA: KID, ICAO: ESMK) previously known as Kristianstad Airport is a regional airport situated outside Kristianstad in Scania, Sweden.

The airport is the smallest by passenger numbers in Sweden south of Gothenburg. The airport has had varying passenger numbers and occasional closures as there are other alternative airports within 100 kilometers distance.

== History ==
=== Foundation and early years ===
The airport was built during the 1940s for military usage. A paved runway was taken into use by 1953.

Following a cooperation between Kristianstad and further communities in Northeastern Skåne, scheduled flights commenced out of Kristianstad in April 1961 to Stockholm Bromma with Linjeflyg. Initially, Linjeflyg offered two weekdaily roundtrips using a Douglas DC-3. Linjeflyg later upgraded the service to Convair Metropolitan until introducing much larger jet-engined Fokker F28 on the route. From 1983, Linjeflyg withdrew flights to Bromma in favor of Stockholm-Arlanda.

In 1988, the airport saw its first international route, connecting Kristianstad with Kastrup. Flights were operated by Muk Air. The flights were discontinued in 2000 following the opening of the Öresund bridge, drastically shortening travel time on land from Kristianstad to Copenhagen.

Further international flights were introduced in 1993, when Air Lithuania started flights to Kaunas and Palanga. The airline flew in Kristianstad for ten years.

In 1993, Linjeflyg was integrated into SAS Scandinavian Airlines, meaning that flights to Stockholm Arlanda now were operated and marketed by SAS.

Between 1998 and 2001, Ryanair flew between Kristianstad and London-Stansted using its Boeing 737 fleet. The service was cancelled despite having a contractual obligation to run flights until 2003. The closure was predominantly caused by reintroduced Ryanair flights from London to Malmö-Sturup, about a 100-minute car journey from Kristianstad.

=== SAS closure ===
In April 2002, SAS Scandinavian Airlines announced that it would close down flights from Kristianstad to Stockholm-Arlanda by the end of October along with other destinations. At the time of closure, SAS made five daily return flights.
Two airlines subsequently assumed the route: Skyways using Fokker 50 aircraft to Stockholm-Arlanda and Malmö Aviation with jet aircraft to Stockholm-Bromma. The competitors offered a total of 10 daily frequencies to Stockholm when they both commenced their flights out of Kristianstad on 28 October 2002.
The two carriers were in stiff competition for passengers as the market was not huge enough for two carriers offering multiple-daily flights. Malmö Aviation therefore withdrew their flights in late March 2003, half a year after they had started, leaving Skyways as the only carrier on the Stockholm route.

Furthermore, also Air Lithuania cancelled its Kaunas/Palanga service in March 2003. The route was subsequently taken over by Direktflyg, offering flights from Gothenburg via Kristianstad to Palanga and vice versa. The service lasted for about one year before it was abandoned.

In 2006, the airport entered a contract with Gothenburg-based City Airline over new twice-daily flights to Stockholm-Bromma. City Airline was given a minimum revenue guarantee of 4m SEK per months. Should its revenues out of Kristianstad fall below, the airport would pay the difference. The flights commenced in August and were to the mishap of incumbent carrier Skyways. Skyways went to court, accusing the revenue guarantee as an illegal state aid. The court confirmed Skyways' position in December 2006, when the airport already had paid 5.6 million krona to City Airline. City Airline closed subsequently closed the route in April 2007. Due to the cancellation of the revenue guarantee, it lacked 15 million krona. In 2009, it agreed with the airport that it would receive 1.5 million krona in compensation. Skyways itself required 17m SEK compensation. It settled the case with the airport in 2008, although the compensation given was not made public.

In 2011, Skyways commenced international flights from Kristanstad to Berlin Tegel. The three-weekly flights started on 2 May but were already dropped three weeks later on 27 May.

Skyways ceased all operations due to financial reasons on 22 May 2012 without prior notice. Kristianstad thereby was left without any scheduled flights.

=== Flyglinjen and other small airlines assume operations ===
Following the bankruptcy of Skyways, the airport was left without scheduled flights since May 2012. However, it lasted until August 20 before a new carrier resumed the vacant Stockholm route. The new operator was relatively young and small virtual carrier "Flyglinjen". As the company lacked an own licence, it deployed a Saab 340 chartered from Sky Taxi on the route and offered up to three daily flights. The Polish Saab 340 was replaced by a larger Fokker 50 chartered from Greek Minoan Air in October. The Fokker itself was again replaced in August 2013 by an Embraer 145 jet aircraft operated by bmi regional.

Despite now having a new carrier in place, the passenger numbers declined heavily as Fliglinjen just offered a much smaller capacity than Skyways once did.

In 2014, the airport handled around 39500 passengers. The airport accepted several charter flights to Antalya in Turkey as well occasionally to a few more destinations. Furthermore, Flyglinjen continued its operations to Stockholm but changed its name to Sparrow Aviation in August. Kristianstad Airport AB revenues totalled 4,692 million krona while it made a loss of 14.000 krona.

In 2016, the number of passengers dropped by 5000 to 30000. This was mainly due to the fact, that not a single charter flight to Turkey took place and a reduced number of flights by Sparrow Aviation. Furthermore, the airport and the virtual carrier agreed a new contract for future operations. Despite having a turnover of 8,05 million krona, Kristianstad Airport AB lost 6,282 million krona that year. In 2016, Kristianstad Airport AB was owned by Kristianstads kommun (91%), Hässleholms kommun (5%), Bromölla kommun (2%)and Östra Göinge kommun (2%). It employed 24 people.

In 2018, Sparrow Aviation closed down all its routes. Braathens Regional Airways (BRA) then took over the line Kristianstad-Arlanda. As a result of the Coronavirus pandemic, BRA closed many of its services in March 2020, including Kristianstad. No scheduled flights took place, but some taxi flights and private jets. A new airline, Skåneflyg, has decided to resume the route to Stockholm in the spring of 2022, operated by Nyxair. Since scheduled operations commenced, Stockholm has been by far the most important route out of Kristianstad although it has been closed down occasionally. In the past, several other destinations were served out of Kristianstad from time to time.

In March 2023, Skåneflyg again announced the termination of the airport's sole scheduled service. In Augusti 2023, the airline BRA started operations, now with a stopover at Växjö BRA cancelled all own operations in December 2024, and no other operator was known to take over Kristianstad-Stockholm at that time.

== Airlines and destinations ==
As of 31 December 2024, there are no regular commercial passenger flights to/from Kristianstad airport.
