= Nordic Airways =

Swedish airline

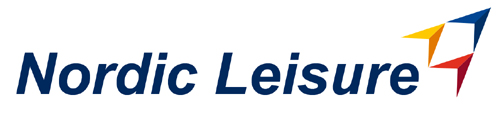
IATA	ICAO	Call sign
6N	NRD	NORTH RIDER
- Founded: 2004
- Ceased operations: 2009
- Hubs: Stockholm-Arlanda Airport
- Fleet size: 2
- Headquarters: Stockholm, Sweden
- Key people: Gunnar Olsson, Managing Director
- Website: www.nordicairways.se

Nordic Airways was an airline based in Stockholm, Sweden. It operated extensive charter and wet lease services. The company's low-cost airline subsidiary Nordic Regional also operated a scheduled network of services linking five domestic and one international destination. Its main base was Stockholm-Arlanda Airport.

Nordic Airways served charter flights for Airtours, Apollo and Neckerman as well as ACMI charters for SAS, Germanwings, Spanair, Sterling, LTE International Airways, Air Comet and Centralwings.

== History ==
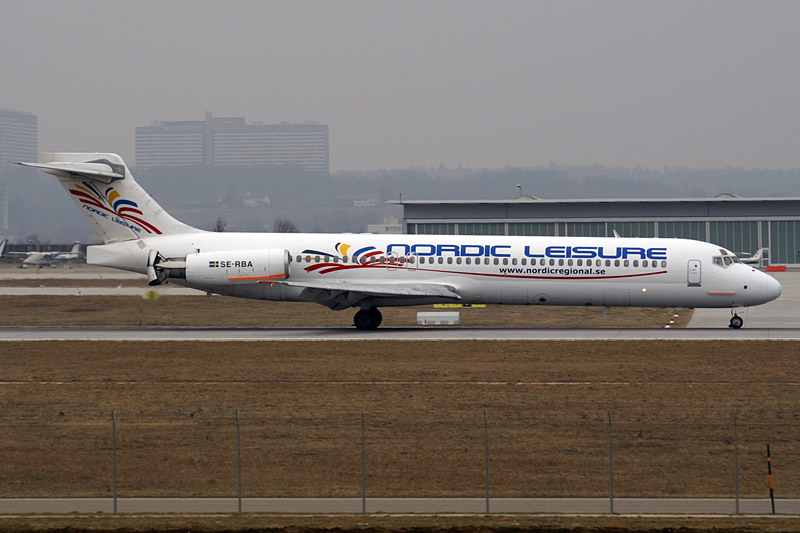

On 2 January 2009, Nordic Airways operated the first commercial flight between Europe and Iraq in 17 years. The flight carried about 150 passengers and operated between Copenhagen and Baghdad.

On 24 January 2009, Nordic Airways lost their operator certificate due to financial troubles.

The successor of Nordic Airways is Air Sweden.

== Fleet ==
The Nordic Airways fleet included the following aircraft (as of 8 September 2008):

- 1 McDonnell Douglas MD-81 (SE-DMT)
- 1 McDonnell Douglas MD-83 (SE-RDM)

From 2007, there were five MD-80s in the fleet. Nordic Airways operated many domestic flights for SAS when its fleet of Dash 8 Q400 was grounded in 2007. Shortly thereafter, Nordic Airways also began operating flights throughout northern Europe for SAS. Two MD-80s were returned to their lessors in 2007 and 2008.

By the end of 2009, only SE-DMT and SE-RDM remained in the fleet. One SAAB 340A (SE-LMX) was also flying in northern Sweden, and one Cessna 525 (SE-RIO) was part of the fleet through Panaxia.

By late 2009, the airline declared bankruptcy and stopped flying.
