= Swedline Express =

Swedish airline

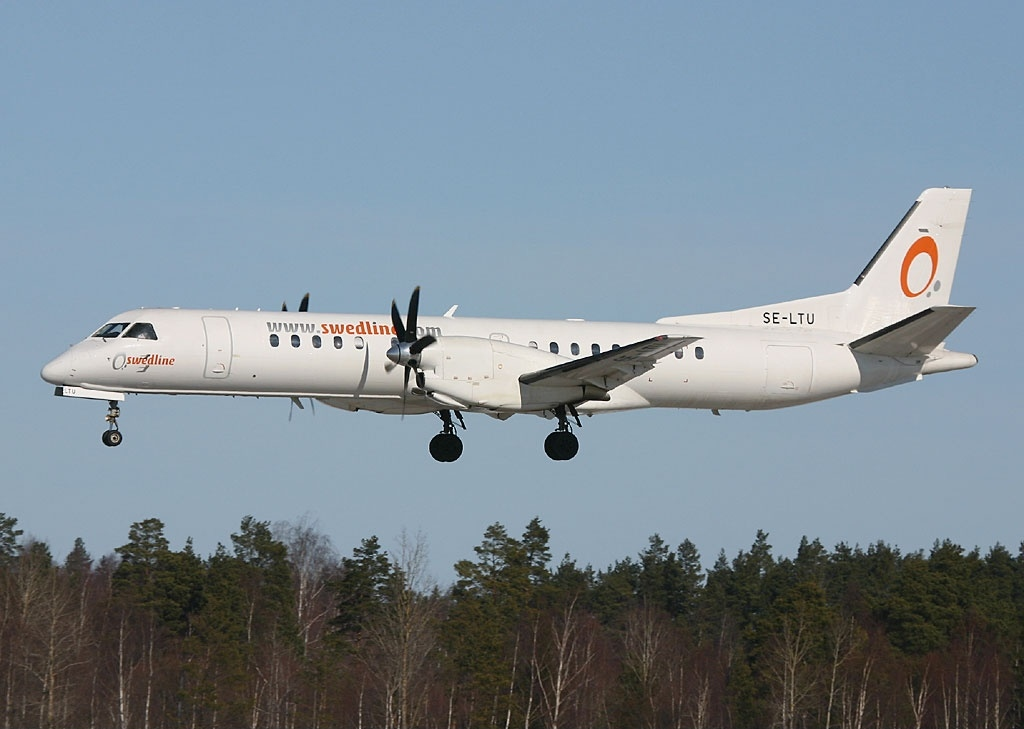
- Saab 2000 operated by Swedline Express at Arlanda Airport
IATA	ICAO	Call sign
SM	SRL	STARLINE
- Founded: 2002
- Ceased operations: 2006
- Hubs: Hultsfred Airport
- Fleet size: See Fleet below

Swedline Express was an airline based in Hultsfred, Sweden. It operated domestic and international passenger services.

== Code data ==
- IATA Code: SM
- ICAO Code: SRL
- Callsign: Starline

== History ==
The airline was established and started operations in 1993 as Varmlandsflyg until 1 December 2002 when it changed its name to Swedline Express. It was wholly owned by Sievert Andersson.

On 12 July 2006 the airline ceased operations due to bankruptcy.

== Fleet ==
The Swedline Express fleet consisted of the following aircraft in August 2006:

- 2 - Saab 2000
- 3 - Saab 340A
