= Sparrow Aviation =

Swedish airline

Sparrow Aviation AB
IATA	ICAO	Call sign
-	-	-
- Founded: 2010
- Ceased operations: 25 June 2018
- Hubs: Stockholm Arlanda
- Fleet size: 1
- Headquarters: Stockholm, Sweden
- Key people: Jeeban Kunwar (CEO)
- Website: https://www.sparrow.se

Sparrow Aviation (previously known as Flyglinjen) was a domestic airline based in Stockholm, Sweden. The airline was re-branded in July 2014 and changed its name from Flyglinjen to Sparrow Aviation. The airline filed for bankruptcy on 25 June 2018.

== History ==
Flyglinjen started in 2010 and operated domestic flights in the south of Sweden. The airline had its base at Jönköping Airport. In March 2013 Flyglinjen changed owners and management and in July 2014 the airline changed the name from Flyglinjen to Sparrow Aviation. Sparrow Aviation took over the route from Kristianstad (KID) to Stockholm (ARN) and started a new route on the 18th of August 2014 from Göteborg City Airport (GSE) to Stockholm Bromma Airport (BMA). Both of these routes were operated with Embraer-145 jet-aircraft from BMI Regional.

The route between Gothenburg and Stockholm ended in January 2015 due to the sudden closure of Göteborg City Airport by Swedavia. On March the 2nd 2015 Sparrow Aviation started an international route from Kristianstad (KID) via Kalmar (KLR) to Berlin (TXL). This route has since been discontinued and been replaced by a route from Halmstad (HAD) to Berlin via Kalmar, starting 26 October 2015. In October 2015 Sparrow Aviation also started a new route between Halmstad City Airport and Stockholm Arlanda. In June 2016 both routes from Halmstad were discontinued.

On 25 June 2018, the airline filed for bankruptcy.

== Destinations ==
Sweden

- Kristianstad – Kristianstad Airport (ends 24 June 2018)
- Stockholm – Stockholm-Arlanda Airport

== Fleet ==
At the time of bankruptcy in June 2018, the Sparrow Aviation fleet included the following aircraft:

Aircraft	In fleet	Passengers	Notes
Fokker 50	1	50	SE-LIR, operated by Amapola Flyg
Total	1		

== See also ==
- Airlines
- Transport in Sweden
