= Aerosynchro Aviation =

Swedish charter airline

IATA	ICAO	Call sign
6I	IBZ	INTERBIZ
- Founded: 1983; 43 years ago
- Hubs: Stockholm-Arlanda Airport; Stockholm-Bromma Airport
- Fleet size: 2
- Headquarters: Karlshamn, Sweden

Aerosynchro Aviation (formerly International Business Air (IBA)) is an airline based in Karlshamn, Sweden. It operates on-demand passenger charter and cargo flights in Europe, Africa and Asia. Its main bases are Stockholm-Arlanda Airport and Stockholm-Bromma Airport.

== History ==
The airline was established as IBA (International Business Air) and started operations in 1983 as an air-taxi operator with Piper PA-31 Navajo aircraft. It expanded to operate charter, cargo and scheduled services, although the latter were terminated in 2001. It had 22 employees (at March 2007). It was renamed in 2007.

== Fleet ==
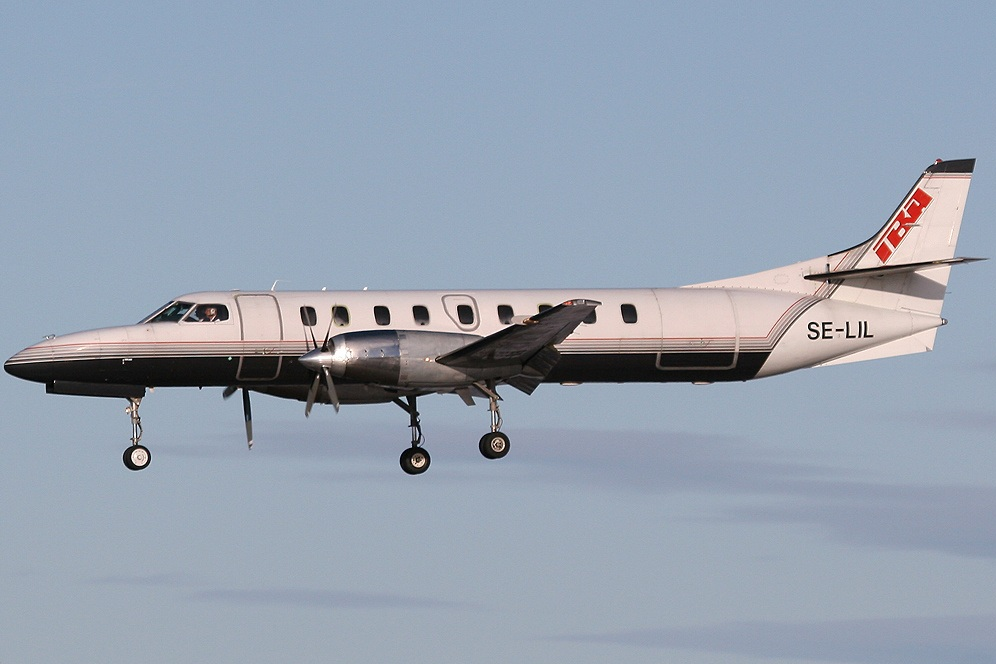
International Business Air Fairchild Swearingen SA-227AC Metro III

The Aerosynchro Aviation fleet included the following aircraft (as of March 2015). No aircraft is certified as airworthy anymore. The last certificate to expire was that of SE-LIL, which expired on December 31, 2008.

- 1 Embraer EMB 120ER Brasilia SE-LKC
- 1 Fairchild Metro III SE-LIL
