= Avincis Sweden =

Airline and emergency aviation provider in Sweden

Avincis Aviation Sweden AB
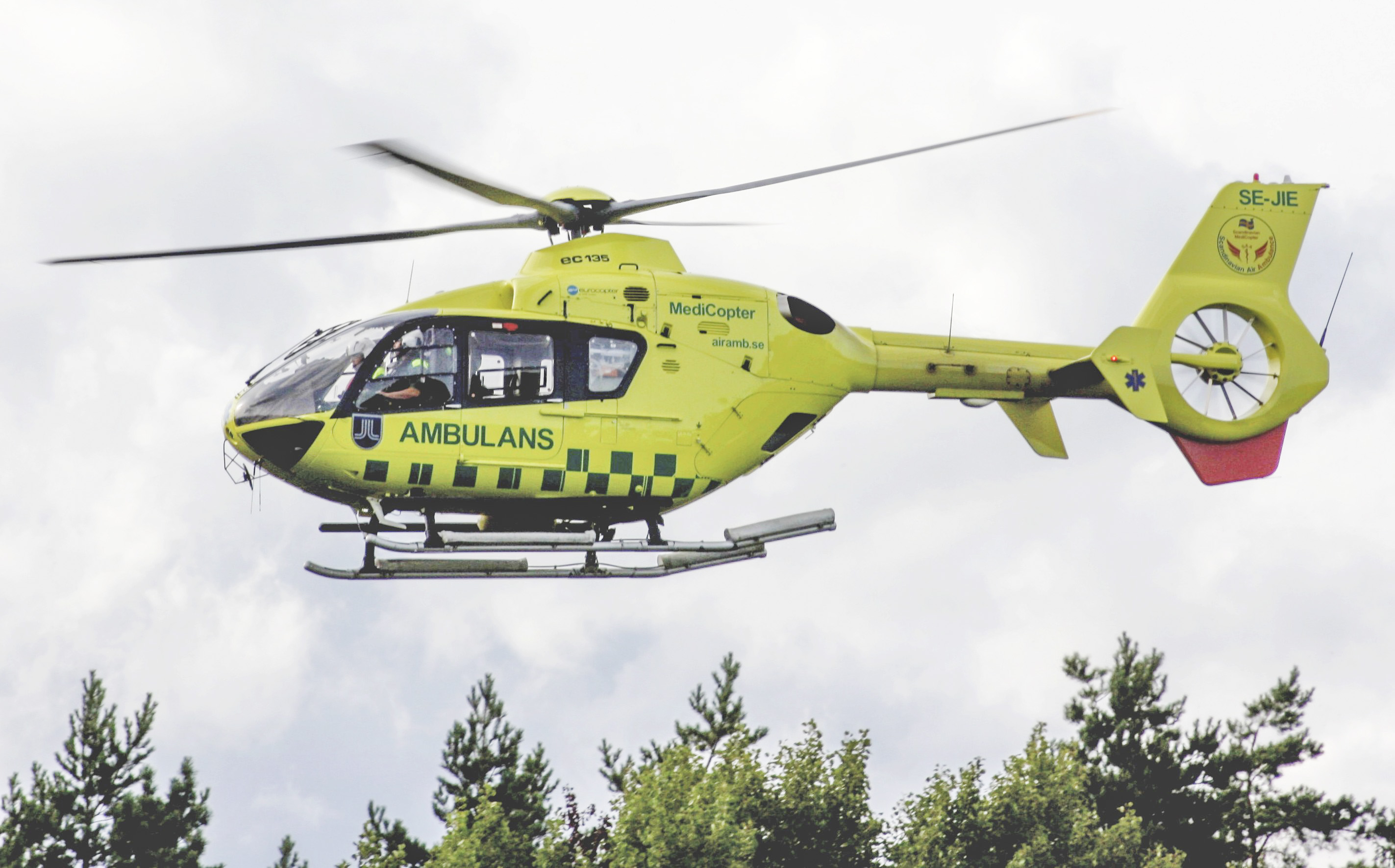
- One of the company's EC135 helicopters
IATA	ICAO	Call sign
—	DFL	MEDIFLIGHT
- Hubs: 12
- Fleet size: 27
- Parent company: Avincis
- Headquarters: Stockholm Arlanda Airport
- Key people: Marius Hansen (managing director)
- Website: www.avincis.com

Avincis Aviation Sweden AB, until March 2023 known as Babcock Scandinavian AirAmbulance, is a Swedish helicopter and fixed-wing airline that operates primarily air ambulance helicopters and planes for the Swedish, Finnish and Norwegian governments owned by Avincis.

The airline operates 18 helicopters and nine fixed-wing aircraft. Their maintenance centre is in Frösön, and their headquarters is in Stockholm Arlanda Airport.

== Fleet ==
As of October 2019, the Babcock Scandinavian AirAmbulance fleet included:

- 8 Beech King Air B200
- 6 AgustaWestland AW169
- 6 Airbus Helicopters H145
- 5 Airbus Helicopters AS365 Dauphin
- 1 Airbus Helicopters H135
- 1 Learjet 35A
