= Luleå Airport =

Luleå Airport Luleå flygplats
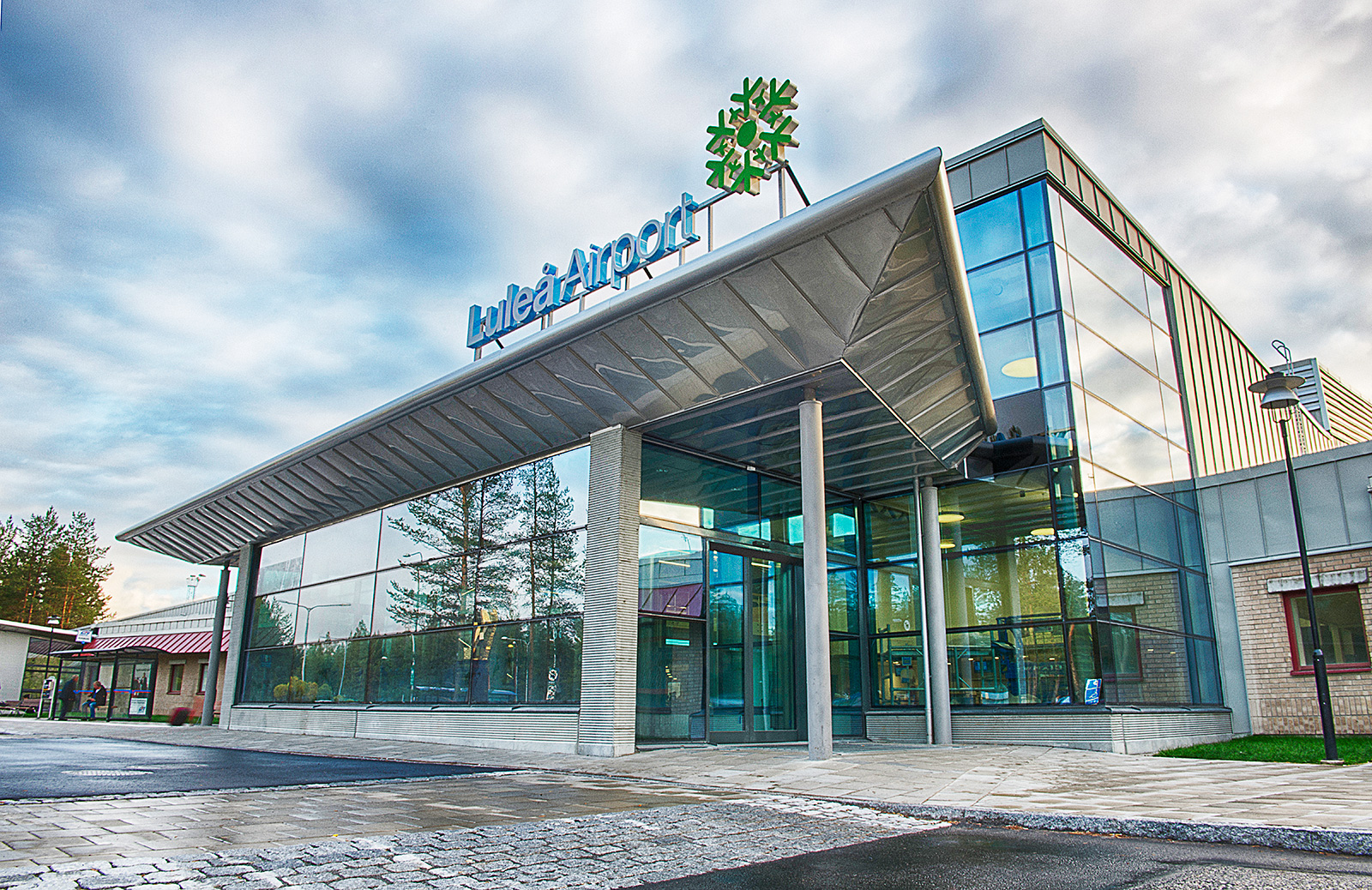
- IATA: LLA; ICAO: ESPA

Summary
- Airport type: Military/public
- Operator: Swedavia
- Serves: Luleå
- Location: Luleå, Sweden
- Time zone: CET (UTC+1)
  - Summer (DST): CEST (UTC+2)
- Elevation AMSL: 65 ft (20 m)
- Coordinates: 65°32′37″N 022°07′19″E
- Website: www.swedavia.com/lulea/

Map
- Location within Norrbotten LLA (Sweden)

Runways
Direction	Length		Surface
Direction	ft	m	Surface
14/32	10,990	3,350	Asphalt

Statistics (2023)
- Passengers total: 1,034,866
- International passengers: 67,032
- Domestic passengers: 967,834
- Statistics: Swedavia

Luleå Airport (IATA: LLA, ICAO: ESPA) is located about 7 km (4.3 mi) south-southeast of Luleå, Sweden, near the village of Kallax. The official name according to the Swedish Aeronautical Information Publication is Luleå/Kallax Airport. The airport handled a total of 980,333 passengers in 2024, making it Sweden's fourth-busiest airport. It is the largest airport in northern Sweden (Norrland). The runway is also used by the Norrbotten Wing (F 21).

== History ==
The airport began as the military airfield Norrbotten Wing (F 21) in 1941 and later opened up to civilian traffic to Stockholm on September 11, 1944. Winter operations began in 1948 when a hangar was built and runway lights were operational. International tourist charters started in 1969. The present terminal building was opened in 1984. The number of passengers increased a lot in the 1980s and then decreased much in the 1990s, both here and in all of Sweden, reached one million at Luleå in 1991, a figure which was reached again 2011. The passenger figures have still been fairly steady at Luleå since other transport modes and other airports are less attractive when going to Luleå. In 1999 the runway at Luleå Airport was extended to 3,350 meters for cargo flights, but that has not led to an increase in traffic; the airport authority attributes the lack of growth to the economy.

== Airlines and destinations ==
=== Passenger ===
The following airlines operate regular scheduled and charter flights at Luleå Airport:

Airlines	Destinations
Edelweiss Air	Seasonal: Zurich
Jonair	Pajala
Norwegian Air Shuttle	Stockholm–Arlanda
Scandinavian Airlines	Gothenburg, Stockholm–Arlanda
Transavia	Seasonal: Paris–Orly
Vueling	Seasonal: Paris–Orly

=== Cargo ===
Airlines	Destinations
Zimex Aviation	Umeå

== Statistics ==
Busiest routes to and from Luleå Airport (2024)
Rank	Airport	Passengers handled	% change 2023/24
1	Stockholm	900,833	▼4.5
2	Gothenburg	13,009	▼28.9
3	Gran Canaria	12,076	▼6.0
4	Rhodes	10,459	▼27.8
5	Paris	9,586	▲81.5

Traffic by calendar year
Year	Passenger volume	Change	Domestic	Change	International	Change
2025	1,103,660	▲12.7%	1,050,726	▲14.3%	52,934	▼11.5%
2024	978,932	▼5.4%	919,099	▼5.0%	59,833	▼10.7%
2023	1,034,866	▲13.5%	967,834	▲10.9%	67,032	▲72.7%
2022	911,872	▲91.5%	873,056	▲85.4%	38,816	▲620.3%
2021	476,294	▲13.3%	470,905	▲14.7%	5,389	▼43.9%
2020	420,202	▼63.8%	410,589	▼61.7%	9,613	▼89.4%
2019	1,162,314	▼3.3%	1,071,742	▼3.5%	90,572	▼0.6%
2018	1,201,384	▼0.3%	1,110,223	▼0.2%	91,161	▼0.6%
2017	1,204,535	▲0.6%	1,112,790	▲0.5%	91,745	▲2.2%
2016	1,197,550	▲1.7%	1,107,759	▲3.6%	89,791	▼16.9%
2015	1,177,443	▲3.3%	1,069,400	▲3.1%	108,043	▲4.7%
2014	1,140,244	▲3.0%	1,037,016	▲2.3%	103,228	▲10.5%
2013	1,106,839	▲1.8%	1,013,380	▲0.5%	93,459	▲18.3%
2012	1,087,336		1,008,328		79,008	

== See also ==
- List of the largest airports in the Nordic countries
