= Umeå Airport =

Airport in Sweden

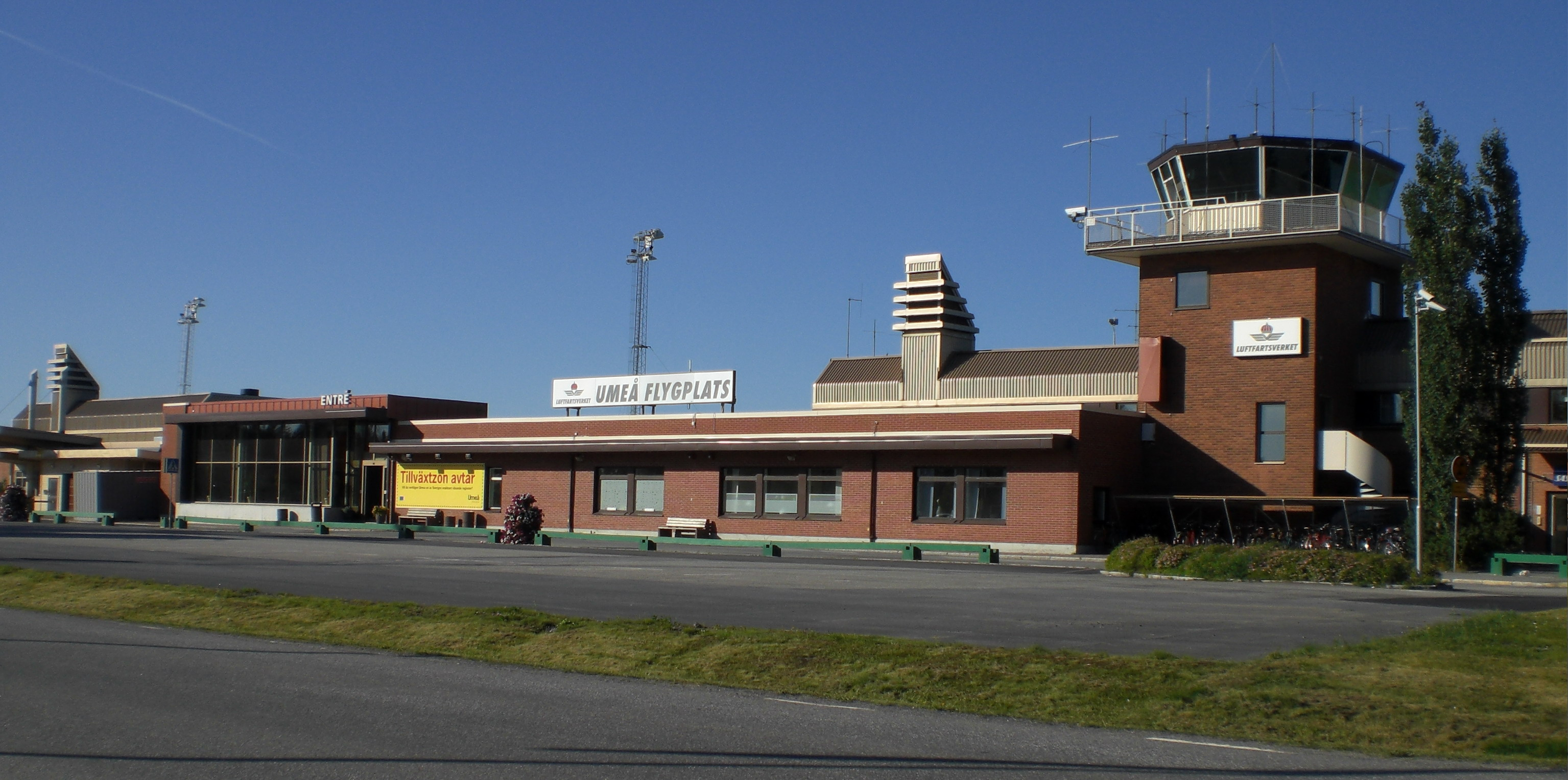
- IATA: UME; ICAO: ESNU

Summary
- Airport type: Public
- Operator: Swedavia
- Serves: Umeå, Sweden
- Elevation AMSL: 24 ft (7.3 m)
- Coordinates: 63°47′31″N 020°16′58″E
- Website: swedavia.com/umea/

Map
- Location within Västerbotten UME (Sweden)

Runways
Direction	Length		Surface
Direction	ft	m	Surface
14/32	7,551	2,302	Asphalt

Statistics (2019)
- Passenger total: 960,351 (▼7%)
- Aircraft movements: 10,152 (▼13%)
- Statistics: Swedavia

Umeå Airport (IATA: UME, ICAO: ESNU) is an airport located on the southern outskirts of the city of Umeå, Sweden. As of 2019, it is the seventh-largest airport in Sweden. It had 960,351 passengers in 2019. By road, the airport is located about 5.4 kilometres (3.4 mi) from Umeå city centre.

== History ==
The airport was inaugurated in May 1962, but had its first flight in 1961.

== Airlines and destinations ==
The following airlines operate regular scheduled and charter flights at Umeå Airport:

Airlines	Destinations
Finnair	Helsinki, Vaasa
Jonair	Östersund
Norwegian Air Shuttle	Stockholm–Arlanda
Scandinavian Airlines	Stockholm–Arlanda
TUI fly Nordic	Seasonal charter: Gran Canaria

== Statistics ==
Busiest routes to and from Umeå Airport (2024)
Rank	Airport	Passengers handled	% change 2023/24
1	Stockholm (Note: Includes flights to/from Stockholm–Arlanda and Stockholm–Bromma)	633,205	▼2.2
2	Gran Canaria	12,301	▲7.5
3	Larnaca	7,024	▲30.5
4	Östersund	4,837	▼3.5
5	Rhodes	4,650	▲17.5

Traffic by calendar year
Year	Passenger volume	Change	Domestic	Change	International	Change
2025	719,596	▲6.6%	693,112	▲8.6%	26,484	▼28.0%
2024	675,108	▼1.6%	638,334	▼2.3%	36,774	▲12.3%
2023	685,824	▲12.8%	653,092	▲12.0%	32,732	▲30.8%
2022	608,205	▲97.9%	583,185	▲92.8%	25,020	▲415.7%
2021	307,379	▲5.0%	302,527	▲7.8%	4,852	▼60.1%
2020	292,728	▼69.5%	280,572	▼68.1%	12,156	▼84.7%
2019	960,351	▼6.9%	880,806	▼7.0%	79,545	▼6.2%
2018	1,031,728	▼2.2%	946,966	▼3.5%	84,762	▲14.4%
2017	1,055,353	▼0.4%	981,231	▼1.8%	74,122	▲23.5%
2016	1,059,194	▲1.1%	999,183	▲2.9%	60,011	▼20.5%
2015	1,047,580	▲0.4%	972,094	▼0.1%	75,486	▲7.4%
2014	1,042,891	▲5.4%	972,601	▲6.3%	70,290	▼5.7%
2013	989,094	▲0.7%	914,555	▼0.1%	74,539	▲12.7%
2012	981,831		915,673		66,158	

== Accidents and incidents ==
- On 21 September 1992, an Air Sweden IAI-1124 Westwind registered as SE-DLK was destroyed by a fire. The plane was departing to Arvidsjaur when takeoff was aborted due to an engine failure. None of the seven occupants were killed or injured, but the aircraft was written off.
- On 14 July 2019, a GippsAero GA8 Airvan aircraft with crew and skydivers lost control and crashed steeply into the ground. It had taken off from Umeå Airport. All nine on board died.

== See also ==
- List of the largest airports in the Nordic countries
