= List of airline codes (N) =

This is a list of all airline codes. The table lists the IATA airline designators, the ICAO airline designators and the airline call signs (telephony designator). Historical assignments are also included for completeness.

== Codes ==
Airline codes
IATA	ICAO	Airline	Call sign	Country	Comments
NP	NIA	Nile Air	NILE BIRD	Egypt	
	SIQ	National Center for Atmospheric Research	SCIENCE QUEST	United States	
	NEJ	Netjets Business Aviation	NET BUSINESS	China	
	NHV	NHV Aviation		Ghana	
	NHC	Northern Helicopter	NORTHERN	Germany	
	DMD	Namdeb Diamond Corporation	DIAMONDJET	Namibia	
6N	NIN	Niger Airlines	NIGER AIRLINES	Niger	
N5	FEY	Fly Easy	FLYEASY	India	
	NUB	Nomad Aviation	VALLETTA	Malta	
	NJA	New Japan Aviation	SHIN NIHON	Japan	
	ROW	Nor Aviation	ROTORWING	Norway	
	NLG	NEL Cargo	NELCARGO	Ivory Coast	
	NHG	NHT Linhas Aéreas	HELGA	Brazil	
	WAR	NZ Warbirds Association	WARBIRDS	New Zealand	
	ANL	Nacoia Lda	AIR NACOIA	Angola	
	NHZ	Nada Air Service	NADA AIR	Chad	
	BFN	Compangnie Nationale Naganagani		Burkina Faso	
	NAH	Nahanni Air Services Ltd	NAHANNI	Canada	
	NKL	Nakheel Aviation	NAKHEEL	United Arab Emirates	
	MRE	Namibia Commercial Aviation	MED RESCUE	Namibia	
	NDF	Namibian Defence Force	NAMIBIAN AIR FORCE	Namibia	
	CNJ	Nanjing Airlines	NINGHANG	China	
DV	ACK	Nantucket Airlines	ACK AIR	United States	WAS 9k
	NYA	Nanyah Aviation	NANYAH	Israel	
	NAP	Napier Air Service Inc	NAPIER	United States	
	NCM	Nas Air	AIR BANE	Angola	
P9		Nas Air		Mali	
UE	NAS	Nasair	NASAIRWAYS	Eritrea	
	NJC	Nashville Jet Charters	NASHVILLE JET	United States	
	NCO	Natalco Air Lines	NATALCO	São Tomé and Príncipe	
	NTK	National Air Traffic Controllers Association	NATCA	United States	
	NSR	National Air Charter	NASAIR	Indonesia	
	RFI	National Air Traffic Services	SHERLOCK	United Kingdom	
	NAN	National Airlines	NATION AIR	United States	defunct
N4	NCN	National Airlines		Chile	
N7	ROK	National Airlines	RED ROCK	United States	defunct
NA	NAL	National Airlines	NATIONAL	United States	defunct
N8	NCR	National Air Cargo dba National Airlines	NATIONAL CARGO	United States	
9Y	NAE	National Airways Ethiopia	NATIONAL	Ethiopia	
IN	NIH	NAM Air	NAM	Indonesia	
	KUS	National Airlines	KUSWAG	South Africa	
9O		National Airways Cameroon		Cameroon	
	LFI	National Airways Corporation	AEROMED	South Africa	
	GTY	National Aviation Company		Egypt	
	TNC	National Aviation Consultants	NATCOM	Canada	
	NXT	National Express	NATIONAL FREIGHT	United States	Texas Air Charters
	GRD	National Grid plc	GRID	United Kingdom	
NC*	JTE	National Jet Express	JETEX	Australia	
	AND	National Jet Service	AIR INDIANA	United States	
NC*	NJS	National Jet Systems	NATIONAL JET	Australia	defunct acquired by Qantas
	NOL	National Overseas Airlines Company	NAT AIRLINE	Egypt	
	NLS	Nationale Luchtvaartschool	PANDER	Netherlands	
	NAE	Nations Air Express Inc	NATIONS EXPRESS	United States	
CE	NTW	Nationwide Airlines	NATIONWIDE	South Africa	
	NWZ	Nationwide Airlines (Zambia)	ZAMNAT	Zambia	
	EVM	Natural Environment Research Council	SCIENCE	United Kingdom	
	NRR	Natureair	NATUREAIR	Costa Rica	
	NRK	Naturelink Charter	NATURELINK	South Africa	
	NVC	Nav Canada	NAV CAN	Canada	
	NAV	Nav Flight Planning	NAV DISPATCH	Czech Republic	
	NVP	Navegacao Aérea De Portugal		Portugal	
	NAY	Navegación Servicios Aéreos Canarios S.A.	NAYSA	Spain	
	IRI	Navid	NAVID	Iran	
	NVM	Naviera Mexicana	NAVIERA	Mexico	
	NVL	Navigator Airlines	NAVLINES	Armenia	
	XNV	Navinc Airlines Services		United States	Tigin Limited
1N		Navitaire		United States	
	XNS	Navtech System Support		Canada	
	NZA	Nayzak Air Transport		Libya	
	NEB	State of Nebraska	NEBRASKA	United States	
	NEC	Necon Air	NECON AIR	Nepal	
	NCG	Nederlandse Kustwacht	NETHERLANDS COASTGUARD	Netherlands	
	NFT	Nefteyugansk Aviation Division	NEFTEAVIA	Russia	
	NLA	Neiltown Air	NEILTOWN AIR	Canada	
	NLC	Nelair Charters	NELAIR	South Africa	
	CGE	Nelson Aviation College	COLLEGE	New Zealand	
RA	RNA	Nepal Airlines	ROYAL NEPAL	Nepal	was Royal Nepal Airlines
NO	NOS	Neos	MOONFLOWER	Italy	
	TOX	Neosiam Airways	SKY KINGDOM	Thailand	
	NSL	Neric	NERICAIR	United Kingdom	
NE	NMA	Nesma Airlines	NESMA	Egypt	
1I	EJA	NetJets	EXECJET	United States	
	NET	Network Aviation Services	NETWORK	Nigeria	
	NEZ	New England Air Express	ENGAIR	United States	
EJ	NEA	New England Airlines	NEW ENGLAND	United States	
	NHT	New Heights 291	NEWHEIGHTS	South Africa	
	NWD	New World Jet Corporation	NEW WORLD	United States	
	NYH	New York Helicopter	NEW YORK	United States	
	GRY	New York State Police	GRAY RIDER	United States	
	KRC	Royal New Zealand Air Force	KIWI RESCUE	New Zealand	
	HVA	Newair	HAVEN-AIR	United States	
	NLT	Newfoundland Labrador Air Transport	NALAIR	Canada	
2N	NTJ	NextJet	NEXTJET	Sweden	
	NXF	Nextflight Aviation	NEXTFLIGHT	United States	
	NXS	Nexus Aviation	NEXUS AVIATION	Nigeria	
	NIS	Nicaragüense de Aviación	NICA	Nicaragua	
	NCN	Nicon Airways	NICON AIRWAYS	Nigeria	Ceased operations 2007
	NGA	Nigeria Airways	NIGERIA	Nigeria	
	NGR	Nigerian Air Force	NIGERIAN AIRFORCE	Nigeria	
	NGX	Nigerian Global	AIR GLOBAL	Nigeria	
	EXT	Nightexpress	EXECUTIVE	Germany	
HG	NLY	Niki	FLYNIKI	Austria	
	NKV	Nikolaev-Air	AIR NIKOLAEV	Ukraine	Airline of Special Purpose
	NSA	Nile Safaris Aviation	NILE SAFARIS	Sudan	
	NVA	Nile Valley Aviation Company		Egypt	defunct
	NLW	Nile Wings Aviation Services	NILE WINGS	Sudan	
	NBS	Nimbus Aviation	NIMBUS	United Kingdom	
	NSR	Nine Star Airways	AIR STAR	Thailand	2014
KZ	NCA	Nippon Cargo Airlines	NIPPON CARGO	Japan	
	NVK	Nizhnevartovskavia	VARTOSKAVIA	Russia	
	NOH	No. 32 (The Royal) Squadron	NORTHOLT	United Kingdom	
	AKG	No. 84 Squadron RAF	GRIFTER	United Kingdom	
	NBL	Nobil Air	NOBIL AIR	Moldova	
DD	NOK	Nok Air	NOK AIR	Thailand	
XW	NCT	NokScoot	BIG BIRD	Thailand	
N5	NRL	Nolinor Aviation	NOLINOR	Canada	
	NMD	Nomad Aviation	NOMAD AIR	Namibia	
	OMD	Nomadic Aviation Group LLC	NOMADIC	United States	
	NOC	Norcopter	NORCOPTER	Norway	
	NEF	Nord-Flyg	NORDEX	Sweden	
5N	AUL	Nordavia	ARCHANGELSK AIR	Russia	
JH	NES	Nordeste Linhas Aéreas Regionais	NORDESTE	Brazil	
6N	NRD	Nordic Regional	NORTH RIDER	Sweden	
Y7	TYA	NordStar	TAIMYR	Russia	
	NDS	Nordstree (Australia)		Australia	
N4	NWS	Nordwind Airlines	NORDLAND	Russia	
	NRT	Norestair	NORESTAIR	Spain	
N5		Norfolk Air		Norfolk Island	Defunct
	NCF	Norfolk County Flight College	COUNTY	United Kingdom	
	FNA	Norlandair	NORLAND	Iceland	
	NOA	Norontair	NORONTAIR	Canada	
	HMF	Norrlandsflyg	LIFEGUARD SWEDEN	Sweden	
	NRX	Norse Air Charter	NORSE AIR	South Africa	
N0	NBT	Norse Atlantic Airways	LONGSHIP	Norway	
Z0	UBT	Norse Atlantic UK	LONGBOAT	United Kingdom	
	NIR	Norsk Flytjeneste	NORSEMAN	Norway	
	NOR	Norsk Helikopter	NORSKE	Norway	
	DOC	Norsk Luftambulanse	HELIDOC	Norway	
	RTV	Nortavia	TIC-TAC	Portugal	
	NAI	North Adria Aviation	NORTH-ADRIA	Croatia	
NA	NAO	North American Airlines	NORTH AMERICAN	United States	
	HMR	North American Charters	HAMMER	Canada	
	NAJ	North American Jet Charter Group	JET GROUP	United States	
	NAT	North Atlantic Air Inc	MASS AIR	United States	
	NFC	North Atlantic Cargo	NORTH ATLANTIC	Norway	
	NBN	North British Airlines	TEESAIR	United Kingdom	
	NCB	North Caribou Flying Service Ltd	NORTH CARIBOU	Canada	
N/A	N/A	North Coast Air Services Ltd	NORTH COAST	Canada	
N9		North Coast Aviation		Papua New Guinea	
M3	NFA	North Flying	NORTH FLYING	Denmark	
	NRC	North Sea Airways	NORTH SEA	Netherlands	
	SBX	North Star Air Cargo	SKY BOX	United States	
	NRV	North Vancouver Airlines	NORVAN	Canada	
	NWW	North West Airlines	HALANT	Australia	
	PTO	North West Geomatics	PHOTO	Canada	
	NEN	North-East Airlines	NORTHEAST SWAN	Nigeria	
	VBG	North-West Air Transport Company - Vyborg	VYBORG AIR	Russia	
HW	NWL	North-Wright Airways	NORTHWRIGHT	Canada	
	NLL	Northafrican Air Transport	NORTHAFRICAN AIR	Libya	
	NFL	Northaire Freight Lines	GREAT LAKES	United States	
	NSF	Northamptonshire School of Flying	NORTON	United Kingdom	
	NCE	Northcoast Executive Airlines	TOP HAT	United States	
NE	NEE	Northeast Airlines	NORTHEAST	United States	
	NPX	Northeast Aviation	NORTHEAST EXPRESS	United States	
	NEW	Northeastern Aviation	MEADOW FLIGHT	United States	2014
NC*	NAC	Northern Air Cargo	YUKON	United States	
	BYC	Northern Airlines Sanya	BEIYA	China	
	NDA	Northern Airways	NORTHERN DAKOTA	United States	
	CMU	Northern Aviation Service	LANNA AIR	Thailand	
U7		Northern Dene Airways		Canada	
	NEX	Northern Executive Aviation	NEATAX	United Kingdom	
	NIC	Northern Illinois Commuter	ILLINOIS COMMUTER	United States	
	NTX	Northern Jet Management	NORTAX	United States	
7H	RVF	Northern Pacific Airways	—Raven Flight	United States	
	NTA	Northern Thunderbird Air	THUNDERBIRD	Canada	
	KOE	Northland Aviation	KOKEE	United States	
	NSS	Northstar Aviation	NORTHSTAR	United States	
	NHL	Northumbria Helicopters	NORTHUMBRIA	United Kingdom	
	NAL	Northway Aviation Ltd	NORTHWAY	Canada	
	NWE	Northwest Aero Associates		United States	
NW	NWA	Northwest Airlines	NORTHWEST	United States	defunct merged with Delta Air Lines
FY	NWR	Northwest Regional Airlines		Australia	
	NWT	Northwest Territorial Airways	TERRITORIAL	Canada	
J3	PLR	Northwestern Air	POLARIS	Canada	
	NWN	Northwinds Northern	NORTHWINDS	Canada	
	NAM	Nortland Air Manitoba	MANITOBA	Canada	
D8*	IBK	Norwegian Air International	NORTRANS	Ireland	subsidiary of Norwegian Air Shuttle (Ceased operations 2021)
DY	NOZ	Norwegian Air Shuttle	NORDIC	Norway	
DI	NRS	Norwegian Air UK	REDNOSE*	United Kingdom	subsidiary of Norwegian Air Shuttle (Ceased operations 2021)
DN	NAA	Norwegian Air Argentina	NORUEGA	Argentina	subsidiary of Norwegian Air Shuttle (Ceased operations 2019)
DU	NLH	Norwegian Long Haul	NORSTAR	Norway	subsidiary of Norwegian Air Shuttle (Ceased operations 2021)
DH	NAN	Norwegian Air Norway	NORSHIP	Norway	subsidiary of Norwegian Air Shuttle (transferred sole aircraft back to Norwegian Air Shuttle AOC in 2023)
D8	NSZ	Norwegian Air Sweden	REDNOSE	Sweden	subsidiary of Norwegian Air Shuttle
	TFN	Norwegian Aviation College	SPIRIT	Norway	
	XNT	Notams International		United States	
BJ	LBT	Nouvel Air Tunisie	NOUVELAIR	Tunisia	
O9	NOV	Nova Airways	NOVANILE	Sudan	
	PTR	Nova Scotia Department of Lands and Forests	PATROL	Canada	
1I	NVR	Novair	NAVIGATOR	Sweden	
VQ	NVQ	Novo Air	NOVO AIR	Bangladesh	
	NVG	Novgorod Air Enterprise	SADKO AVIA	Russia	
	NSP	Novosibirsk Aircraft Repairing Plant	NARPAIR	Russia	
	NBE	Novosibirsk Aviaenterprise	NAKAIR	Russia	
	NPO	Novosibirsk Aviation Production Association	NOVSIB	Russia	
	NOY	Noy Aviation	NOY AVIATION	Israel	
N6	ACQ	Nuevo Continente	AERO CONTINENTE	Peru	Operating license revoked by Chile 10/06/2002; Ceased operations 2005; Former name: Aero Continente
	NHR	Nuevo Horizonte Internacional	NUEVO HORIZONTE	Mexico	
	NUN	Nunasi-Central Airlines	NUNASI	Canada	
	NIN	Nurman Avia Indopura	NURVINDO	Indonesia	
	NYS	Nyasa Express	NYASA	Malawi	
1I	NJE	NetJets Europe	FRACTION	Portugal	

== IATA Traffic Conference Areas ==
The International Air Transport Association (IATA) divides the world into three areas called the Traffic Conference Areas (TCAs) for air travel purposes. These areas are used to define geographical boundaries for fare construction and other industry-related practices:

- Traffic Conference Area 1 (TC1) – this area includes the Americas, encompassing North America (the Caribbean, Central America, and Northern America) and South America.
- Traffic Conference Area 2 (TC2) – this area includes the EMEA region, encompassing Europe, the Middle East, and Africa (North Africa and Sub-Saharan Africa).
- Traffic Conference Area 3 (TC3) – this area includes the Asia–Pacific region, encompassing the rest of Asia (Central Asia, East Asia, North Asia, South Asia, and Southeast Asia) and Oceania.

Essentially, TC1 covers the "New World", while TC2 and TC3 together cover the "Old World" (Africa-Eurasia) and the "Land Down Under".

== See also ==
- IATA airport code
- ICAO airport code
