= List of Douglas DC-6 operators =

A great number of airlines and air forces from several countries included the Douglas DC-6 in their fleets at some point in time. Today most DC-6s are inactive, stored, or preserved in museums; although a number are still flying in northern bush operations in Alaska and Canada, while several are based in Europe and a few other DC-6s are still in operation for small carriers in South America.

Below are listed known operators of this airplane, both past and present (♠ indicate Original operators).

== Civil operators ==
Aden

- Brothers Air Service (BASCO)

Afghanistan

- Ariana Afghan Airlines

Antigua

- Seagreen Air Transport

Argentina

- Aerolíneas Argentinas
- Aerolineas Ini y Cia
- Aerotransportes Litoral Argentino (ALA)
- Austral
- Flota Aérea Mercante Argentina (FAMA) ♠

Australia

- Australian National Airlines (ANA) ♠
- Ansett-ANA
- British Commonwealth Pacific Airlines
- Trans Australia Airlines

Belgium

- Belgian International Air Services
- Delta Air Transport
- Inair
- Sabena ♠
- Sobelair
- Transpommair

Bolivia

- Lloyd Aereo Boliviano
- SAVCO (Servicios Aereos Virgen de Copacabna)

Brazil

- Lóide Aéreo Nacional ♠
- Panair do Brasil
- Real Transportes Aéreos
- Varig
- VASP

Cambodia

- Royal Air Cambodge

Canada

- Buffalo Airways
- Canadian Pacific Air Lines ♠
- Maritime Central Airways ♠
- Nordair
- Pacific Western
- Transair
- Wardair Canada

Cayman Islands

- Transocean

Chile

- ALFA Chile - Aerolineas Flecha Austral
- Lineas Aereas del Cobre (Ladeco)
- Lineas Aerea Nacional de Chile (LAN Chile) ♠
- Lineas Aereas Sud Americana (LASA)
- Solastral
- Taxpa - Taxis Aereos del Pacifico
- Transglobal

Colombia

- Aerovias Condor de Colombia
- Aerocosta
- Lineas Aereos Taxader
- Rutas Aereas Soceidad Aerea Medellin
- Tampa Cargo

Costa Rica

- Lineas Aereas Costarricenses (LACSA)
- Transportes Aereos de Integracion (TAISAP)

Denmark

- Nordair
- Sterling Airways

Dominican Republic

- Compania Dominicana de Aviacion (CDA)

Ecuador

- Aerolineas Nacionales del Ecuador (ANDES)
- Ecuatoriana

Egypt

- United Arab Airlines

El Salvador

- Aerolineas El Salvador

Ethiopia

- Ethiopian Air Lines ♠

Finland

- Finlantic
- Kar Air

France

- Aeromaritime d'Affretement
- Agile Azur
- Air France
- Air Inter
- Airnautic
- Compagnie de Transports Aeriens Intercontinentaux (TAI) ♠
- Trans-Union
- Union Aéromaritime de Transport (UAT) ♠

Germany

- Germanair
- Luft-Lloyd
- Sudflug
- Sudwestflug
- Transportflug

Greece

- Olympic Airways ♠

Guatemala

- Aviateca

Haiti

- ADSA

Honduras

- Sahsa
- Transportes Aéreos Nacionales

Hong Kong

- Cathay Pacific Airways ♠

Iceland

- Icelandair
- Loftleidir

Indonesia

- Bayu Indonesia
- PN Aerial Survey
- Trans Nusantara Airways
- Zamrud Airlines

Iran

- Iran Air
- Persian Air Services

Italy

- Alitalia ♠
- Linee Aeree Italiane (LAI) ♠
- Societa Aerea Mediterranea (SAM)

Ivory Coast

- Air Afrique

Japan

- Japan Air Lines ♠

Jordan

- Air Jordan
- Alia

Kuwait

- Kuwait Airways Corporation
- Trans Arabia Airways

Laos

- Lao United Airlines
- Royal Air Lao

Lebanon

- Air Liban ♠
- Lebanese International Airways
- Trans Mediterranean Airways

Libya

- Libavia

Luxembourg

- Interocean Airways

Madagascar

- Madair

Malta

- Malta International Airways

Mexico

- Aerocarga
- Aeronaves de Mexico
- Aeromexico
- Guest Aerovias Mexico
- Mexicana de Aviación ♠
- SAESA

Mozambique
Namibia

- Namibia Commercial Aviation

Nicaragua

- Lineas Aereas de Nicaragua (Lanica)

Netherlands

- KLM ♠
- Transavia

Netherlands Antilles

- Caraibische Lucht Transport Mij NV (CLTM)

New Zealand

- Tasman Empire Airways (TEAL)

Nigeria

- Pan African Airlines

Norway

- Braathens South American and Far East Airtransport
- Fred. Olsen Airtransport

Panama

- Aerovías Panamá
- Aero Fletes Internacionales (AFISA)
- Internacional de Aviacio (Inair)
- Rutas Aereas Panemenas (RAPSA)

Peru

- Aerolineas Peruanas
- Faucett

Philippines

- Filipinas Orient Airways
- Philippine Airlines ♠

Portugal

- TAP
- SATA

Portuguese India (Goa)

- Transportes Aéreos da Índia Portuguesa (TAIP)

Republic of China

- Civil Air Transport ♠
- Far Eastern Air Transport
- Winner Airways

Saudi Arabia

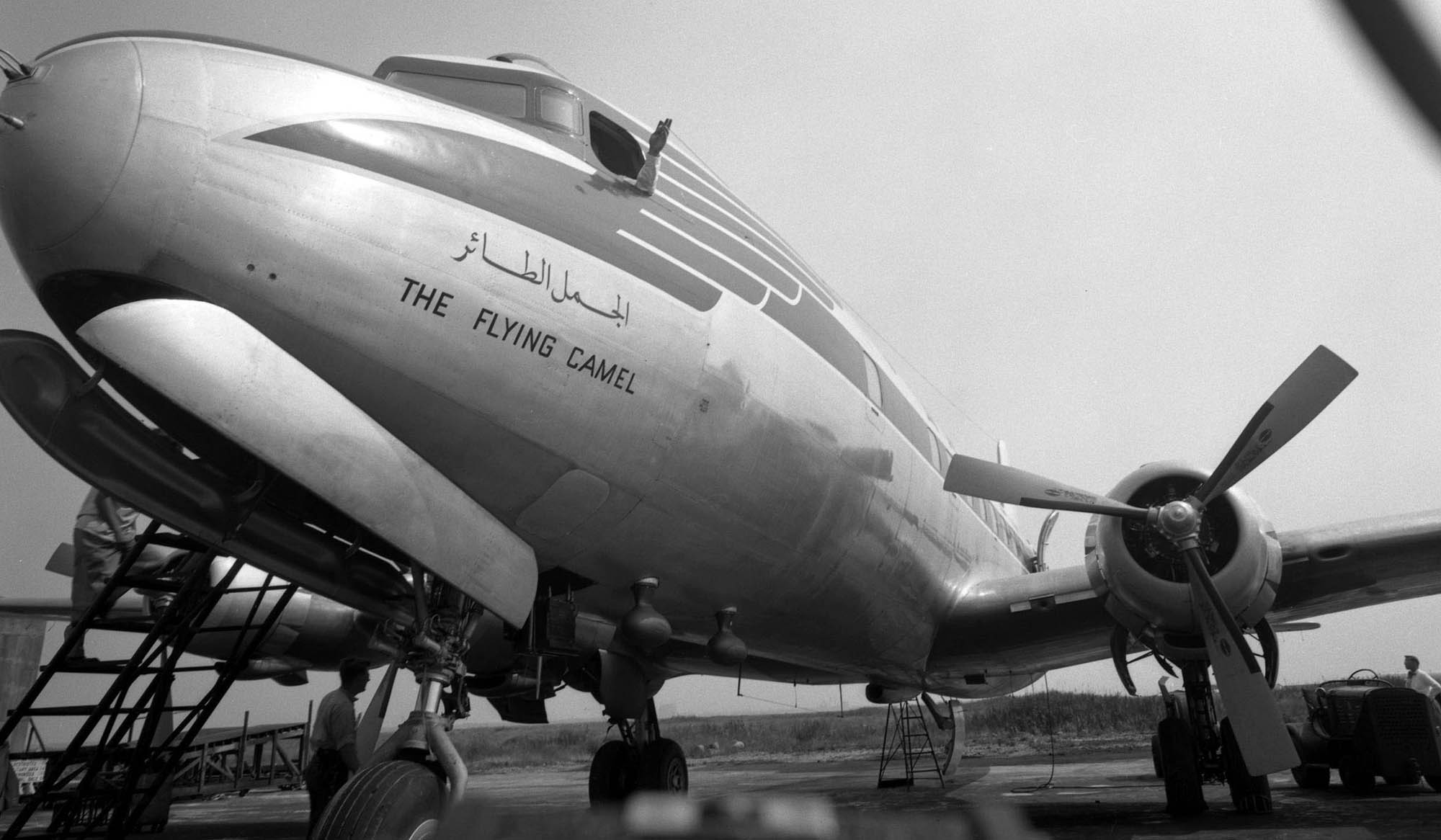
Aramco DC-6B aircraft at Dhahran, Saudi Arabia, in 1952. Scheduled passenger flights operated between New York City, United States, and Dhahran during this period.

- Saudi Arabian Airlines
- Saudi Aramco

Singapore

- Saber Air

Southern Rhodesia

- Central African Airways Corporation (CAAC)

South Vietnam

- Air Vietnam

Spain

- Aviaco
- Spantax DC-6B, DC-6B-ST
- TASSA

Suriname

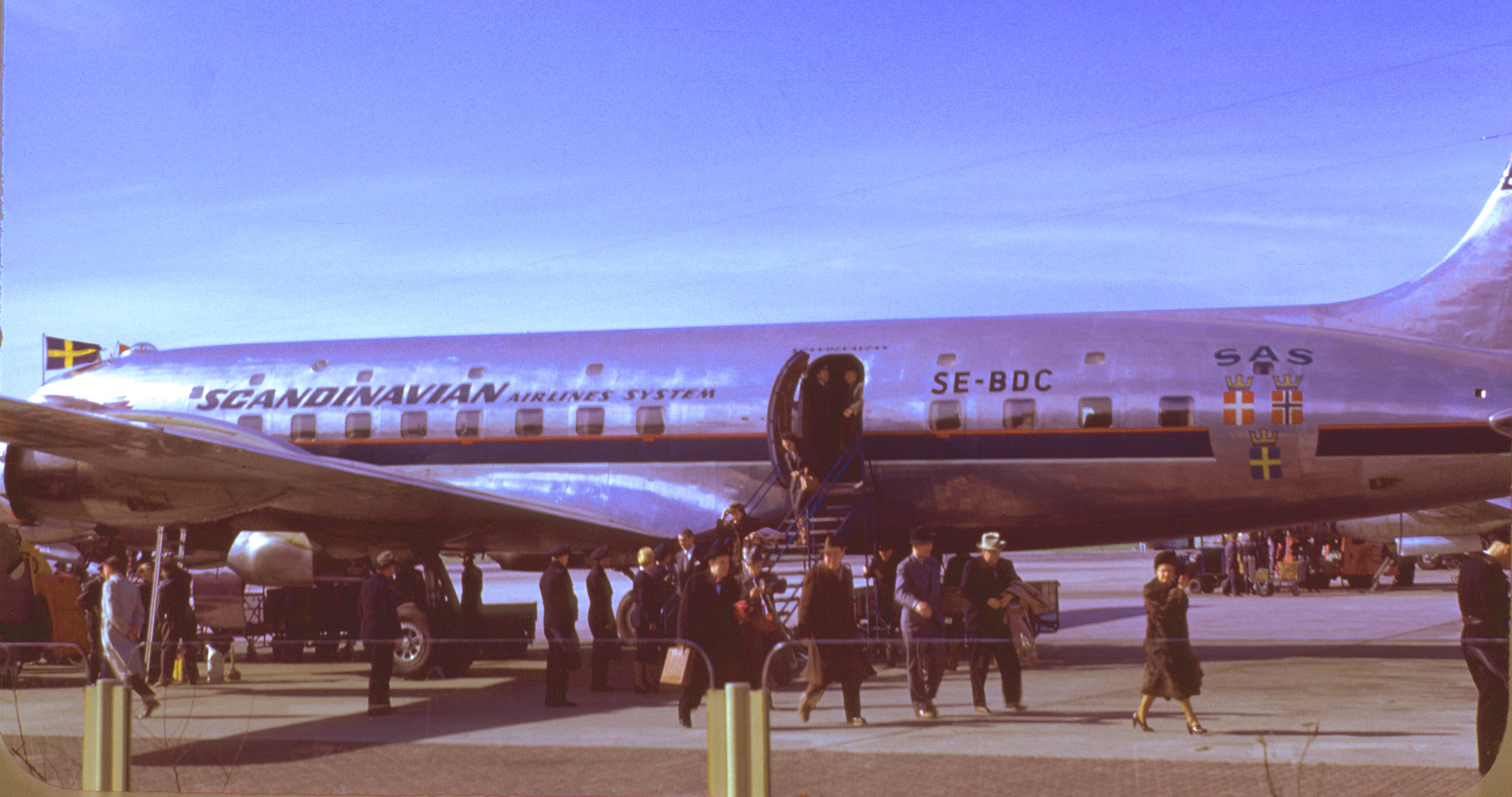
Passengers deplaning an SAS DC-6

Eswatini
Sweden

- Aero-Nord
- Internord Aviation
- Osterman Aero
- Transair Sweden

SwedenDenmarkNorway

- SAS ♠

Switzerland

- Balair
- Swissair ♠

Syria

- Syrian Arab Airlines

Thailand

- Thai Airways International

Trinidad and Tobago

- British West Indian Airways

United Kingdom

- Air Ferry
- Air Atlantique, now West Atlantic; a former cargo carrier based in Coventry, England.
- British Eagle
- British United Airways
- Caledonian Airways
- Cloudmaster
- Cunard Eagle Airways
- Eagle Aviation Ltd
- Hunting-Clan Air Transport ♠
- Lloyd International Airways

United States

- AAXICO Airlines
- Admiral Airlines
- Aero Union
- Air America
- Air Cargo Express
- Alaska Airlines
- All American Airlines
- American Airlines ♠
- Aerovias Sud Americana (aka ASA International Airlines)
- BirdAir
- Braniff International Airways ♠
- Capital Airlines
- Conner Airlines
- Continental Airlines ♠
- Currey Air Transport
- Delta Air Lines ♠
- Eastern Air Lines
- Everts Air
- Flying Tiger Line ♠
- General Airways
- Great Lakes Airlines ♠
- Hawaiian Airlines
- Holiday Airlines (US airline)
- International Airlines
- Lance Air Transport
- Los Angeles Air Service
- Los Angeles Dodgers, Major League Baseball team, DC-6B used for one season (1961)
- Macavia International (spraying)
- Mackey Airlines
- Mercer Airlines
- NASA
- National Airlines ♠

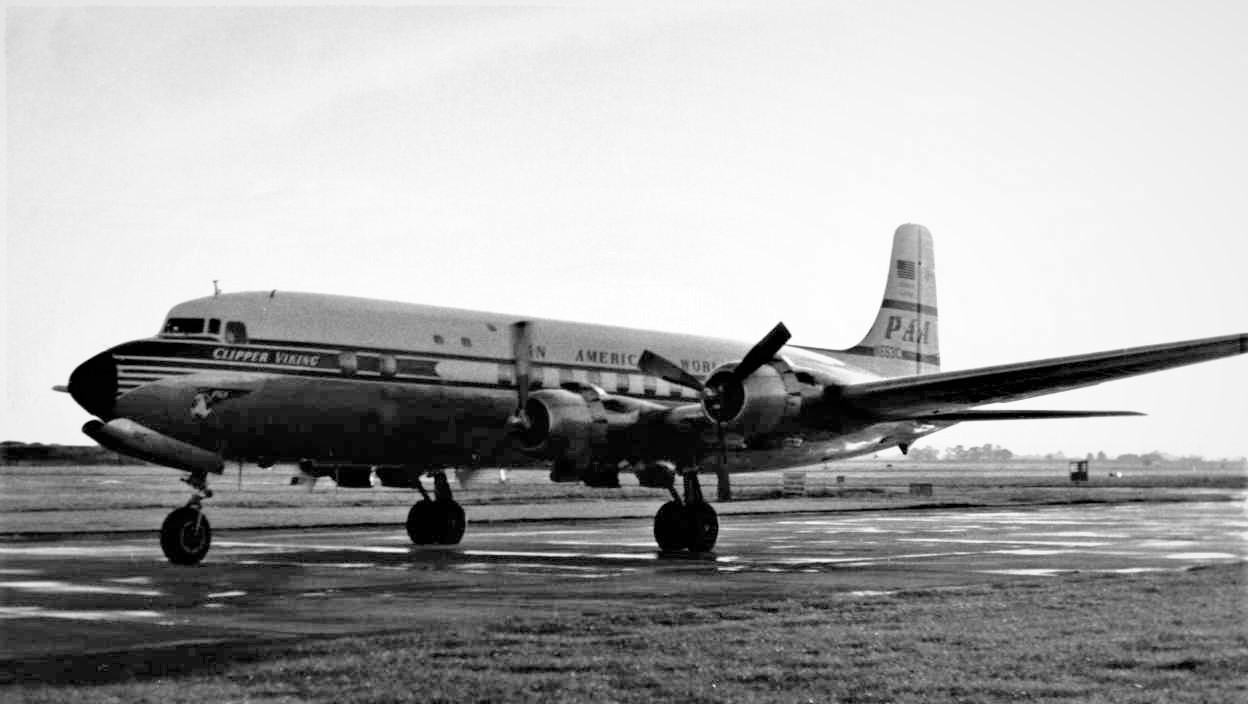
Pan Am Douglas DC-6B in 1954

- North American Airlines ♠
- Northeast Airlines
- Northern Air Cargo
- Northeast Airlines ♠
- Northwest Orient Airlines ♠
- Overseas National Airways ♠
- Pacific Southwest Airlines
- Pan American-Grace Airways ♠
- Pan American World Airways ♠
- President Airlines
- Purdue Aeronautics
- Reeve Aleutian Airways
- Riddle Airlines ♠
- Shamrock Air Lines
- Sis-Q Flying Service (spraying)
- Slick Airways ♠
- Southern Air Transport
- Span East Airlines
- Standard Airways
- Trans Alaskan Airlines
- Trans American Airlines ♠
- Trans Caribbean Airways ♠
- Trans International Airlines
- Transocean Air Lines
- Twentieth Century Aircraft
- United Air Lines ♠
- Universal Airlines
- United States Overseas Airlines
- Western Airlines ♠
- Winner Airways
- World Airways
- Zantop Air Transport

Venezuela

- Avensa
- Rutas Aereas Nacionales (RANSA)

Yemen

- Yemen Airlines

Yugoslavia

- Adria Airways
- Inex-Adria
- Jugoslovenski Aerotransport {JAT} ♠

== Military operators ==
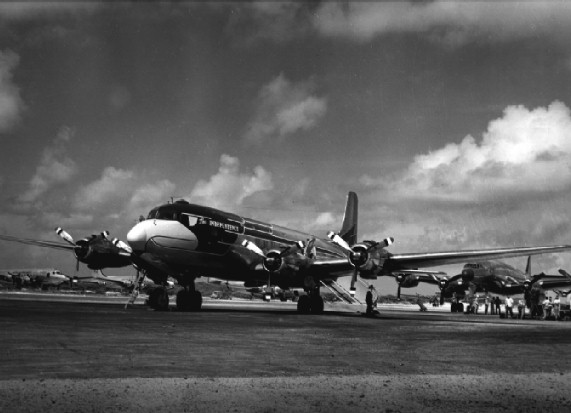
Harry Truman's C-118, The Independence

Argentina

- Argentine Air Force

Belgium

- Belgian Air Force (Four operated from 1960)

Bolivia

- Bolivian Air Force

Brazil

- Brazilian Air Force

Chile

- Chilean Air Force

Republic of China

- Chinese Nationalist Air Force

Colombia

- Colombian Air Force

Ecuador

- Ecuadorian Air Force

El Salvador

- Salvadoran Air Force

France

- French Air Force
- French Navy

Germany

- German Air Force

Guatemala

- Guatemalan Air Force

Honduras

- Honduran Air Force

Italy

- Italian Air Force operated six former civilian aircraft from 1962 until 1981

South Korea

- Republic of Korea Air Force

Mexico

- Mexican Air Force

New Zealand

- Royal New Zealand Air Force
  - No. 40 Squadron RNZAF

Panama

- Panama Air Force

Paraguay

- Paraguayan Air Force

Peru

- Peruvian Air Force

Portugal

- Portuguese Air Force

United States

- United States Air Force ♠
- United States Navy ♠

South Vietnam

- Republic of Vietnam Air Force

Yugoslavia

- Yugoslav Air Force

Zambia

- Zambian Air Force
