= NWW =

NWW may refer to:

- Nurse with Wound, a British band
- the ICAO airline code for North West Airlines (Australia), in List of airline codes (N)
- the station code for North Woolwich railway station, a former railway station in England
