= Air Pegasus =

Regional airline of India (2014–2016)

IATA	ICAO	Call sign
OP	PPL	PEGASUS
- Founded: 2014; 12 years ago
- Commenced operations: 12 April 2015; 11 years ago
- Ceased operations: 27 July 2016; 10 years ago
- Hubs: Kempegowda International Airport
- Fleet size: 3 (July 2016)
- Destinations: 8 (May 2016)
- Parent company: Decor Aviation
- Headquarters: Bangalore, Karnataka, India
- Key people: Shyson Thomas (MD)
- Website: www.airpegasus.in

Air Pegasus was a short-lived Indian regional airline headquartered in Bangalore and based at Kempegowda International Airport. The airline was a subsidiary of Decor Aviation, an aircraft ground-handling services company. It commenced operations on 12 April 2015 with its inaugural flight between Bangalore and Hubli. The airline suspended operations on 27 July 2016, facing financial difficulties. At that time, Air Pegasus was serving eight airports across South India with a hub at Kempegowda International Airport in Bangalore, using a fleet of three ATR 72-500 aircraft. Their flying licence was suspended by DGCA on 22 November 2016. Managing director Shyson Thomas stated in late 2017 that Air Pegasus would return to the skies in early 2018, as the company had formed a relationship with Dawn Aviation and was about to settle all of its debts. Several cases have been filed against Air Pegasus chairmen Shyson Thomas, Shyna Thomas and son Ashwin Thomas who was managing director. Till date no debts have been cleared and Air Pegasus was stricken from the Indian business register as of 18th of April, 2023.

== History ==
Air Pegasus took delivery of its first ATR 72 aircraft in September 2014. It received its Air Operators Permit (AOP) on 24 March 2015 and subsequently commenced operations from 12 April 2015 with its inaugural flight from Bangalore to Hubli.

The airline suspended operations on 27 July 2016, claiming the suspension was temporary and due to technical issues. However, the problems were later revealed to be financial in nature. Aircraft lessors approached the Indian Directorate General of Civil Aviation (DGCA) to deregister their three aircraft leased to Air Pegasus after the airline defaulted on rental payment. Air Pegasus agreed to pay back 50% of its dues to the lessors and said it would pay the remaining in instalments once flights resume.

Air Pegasus' deal with the lessors collapsed, and the DGCA deregistered the airline's entire fleet in October 2016. At the end of the month, however, Air Pegasus managing director Shyson Thomas stated that he was working to obtain an ATR 72 and to resume flights by 15 November.

On 5 October 2016, DGCA issued a show cause notice to Air Pegasus, asking why its AOP should not be suspended for its failure to carry out operations. The regulator had given 15 days for the regional carrier to respond to its notice. As the carrier failed to give assurance on resumption of its operation, DGCA suspended their flying licence on 22 November 2016.

In early 2017, Air Pegasus attempted to work with another airline that had not yet begun operations, FlyEasy; the latter company would buy a 74% stake in Air Pegasus. However, Air Pegasus did not receive the appropriate funds, and the deal collapsed. Towards the end of the year, Thomas announced that Air Pegasus had entered into cooperation with Dawn Aviation, which would take a 60% stake in the airline. He also stated that the company's previous debts were close to being settled. Thomas expected to resume flights in the first quarter of 2018 using leased ATR 72-500s, however both Dawn Aviation and Air Pegasus have dissolved as of 2022 and 2023 respectively.

== Destinations ==
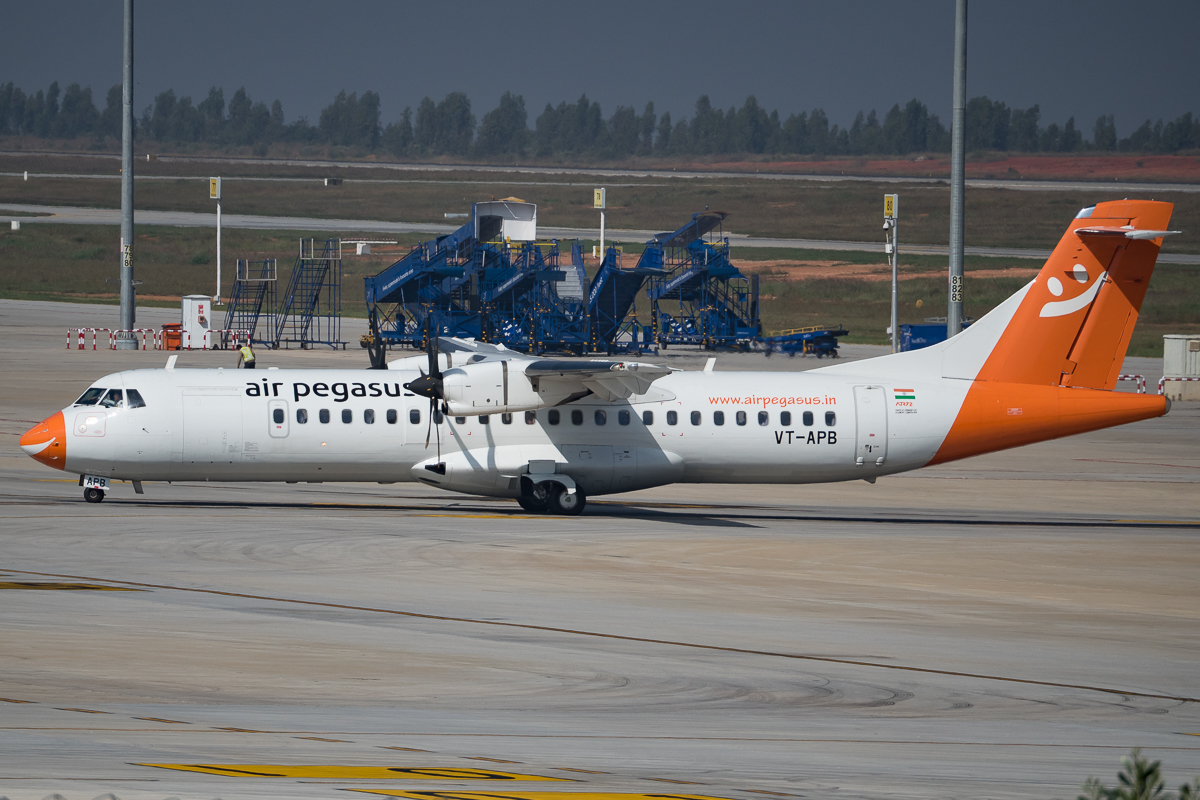
An Air Pegasus ATR 72 at Kempegowda Airport in December 2015

In May 2016, Air Pegasus was flying to the following destinations in India:

State	City	Airport	Notes
Karnataka	Bangalore	Kempegowda International Airport	Hub
Karnataka	Hubli	Hubli Airport	—
Karnataka	Mangalore	Mangalore International Airport	—
Kerala	Kochi	Cochin International Airport	—
Kerala	Thiruvananthapuram	Trivandrum International Airport	—
Tamil Nadu	Chennai	Chennai International Airport	—
Tamil Nadu	Madurai	Madurai Airport	—

== Fleet ==
Ch-aviation reported in December 2017 that Air Pegasus had come into an agreement with a leasing company for the lease of a single ATR 72-500. The airline planned to obtain an additional two ATRs later in 2018 from Vietnam Airlines.

== See also ==
- List of airlines of India
