= Finlantic =

Finnish airline (1961–1963)

IATA	ICAO	Call sign
-	-	-
- Founded: 1961
- Ceased operations: 1963
- Fleet size: 2
- Headquarters: Helsinki, Finland
- Key people: A Tulkki (Chairman)

Finlantic was a Finnish charter airline in operation from 1961 to 1963.

== History ==
The airline was formed to operate long-haul freight and passenger charters and it firstly flew in November 1961 with a Douglas DC-6C. By 1963 it had two aircraft but was reported to have become bankrupt and that had ceased operations.

== Fleet ==
- Douglas DC-6B
- Douglas DC-6C

The company operated two Douglas DC-6 aircraft. The first, OH-DCA, was a DC-6A/B combi (passenger and cargo) aircraft built in 1953, which the company leased from Hawaiian Airlines from 1961 to 1963. The aircraft was named Kamehameha after the founder of the Kingdom of Hawaii. The aircraft had been part of the Slick Airways fleet before. The second aircraft, OH-DCB, was also built in 1953 and was a DC-6B passenger variant. It was leased from Swissair from October 1962 to May 1963.
