= National Airways Corporation =

Commercial aviation company

IATA	ICAO	Call sign
—	LFI	AEROMED
- Founded: 1946
- Fleet size: 34
- Headquarters: Lanseria Airport; Johannesburg, South Africa
- Website: http://www.nac.co.za

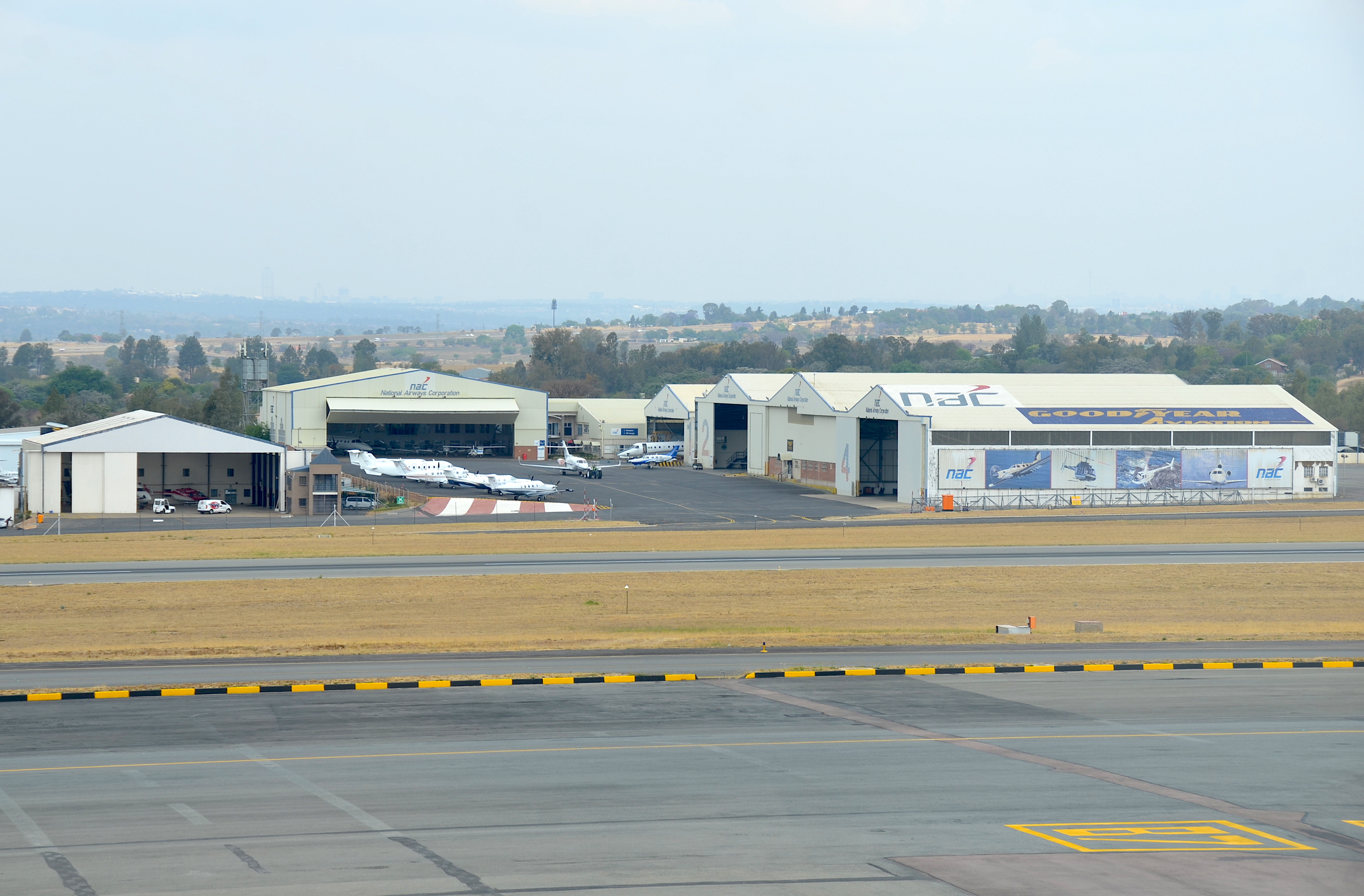
National Airways Corporation at Lanseria International Airport

National Airways Corporation (NAC) is a commercial aviation company with its head office on the grounds of Lanseria Airport in Johannesburg, South Africa. The company offers a range of products and services for fixed-wing aircraft and helicopter markets, including aircraft sales, maintenance, parts, value-added products, aircraft charter, international operations, and pilot training. NAC Operations is the flight operations and charter division. NAC operates a South African network of offices, its main base is Lanseria Airport, with office hubs at Cape Town's V&A Waterfront, Durban, Ultimate Heliport in Midrand and Rand Airport. NAC also has shareholding in Discovery Jets based in Fort Lauderdale, USA.

== History ==
The general aviation company was established in 1946 and started operations on 25 May 1946 as National Air Charters and in 1962 acquired United Air Services; the following year National Air Charter was renamed to National Airways Corporation (NAC) In 1986 NAC acquired Wings Airways and united with Namakwaland Lugdiens.

On 1 July 1999, Imperial Holdings, a mobility group listed on the Johannesburg Stock Exchange, purchased 62% NAC share.

In 2011, Naturelink Aviation was merged into National Airways Corporation.

The company is owned by a consortium of shareholders, including the Directors of NAC.

== Dealerships and representation ==
NAC is an authorised dealer and representative for a variety of manufacturers and service providers in the aviation industry.

=== Aircraft manufacturers ===
- Dassault Aviation
- Bell Helicopter
- Robinson Helicopter
- Piper Aircraft
- Quest Kodiak

== Charter Fleet ==
As of February 2023 the National Airways charter fleet includes:

National Airways Fleet
Aircraft	In Fleet	Notes
Boeing 737-500		
Global XRS		
Gulfstream G550		
Gulfstream 650ER		
Falcon 7X		
Hawker 4000		
Challenger 350		
Bombardier Learjet 60		
Bombardier Learjet 45XR		
Hawker 800XP		
Citation Mustang		
Learjet 35A		
King Air 200		
B1900D		
Embraer 120		
PC12		
Cessna 208B		
Cessna 402C		
