= Everts Air Cargo =

Cargo airline based in Fairbanks, Alaska, US

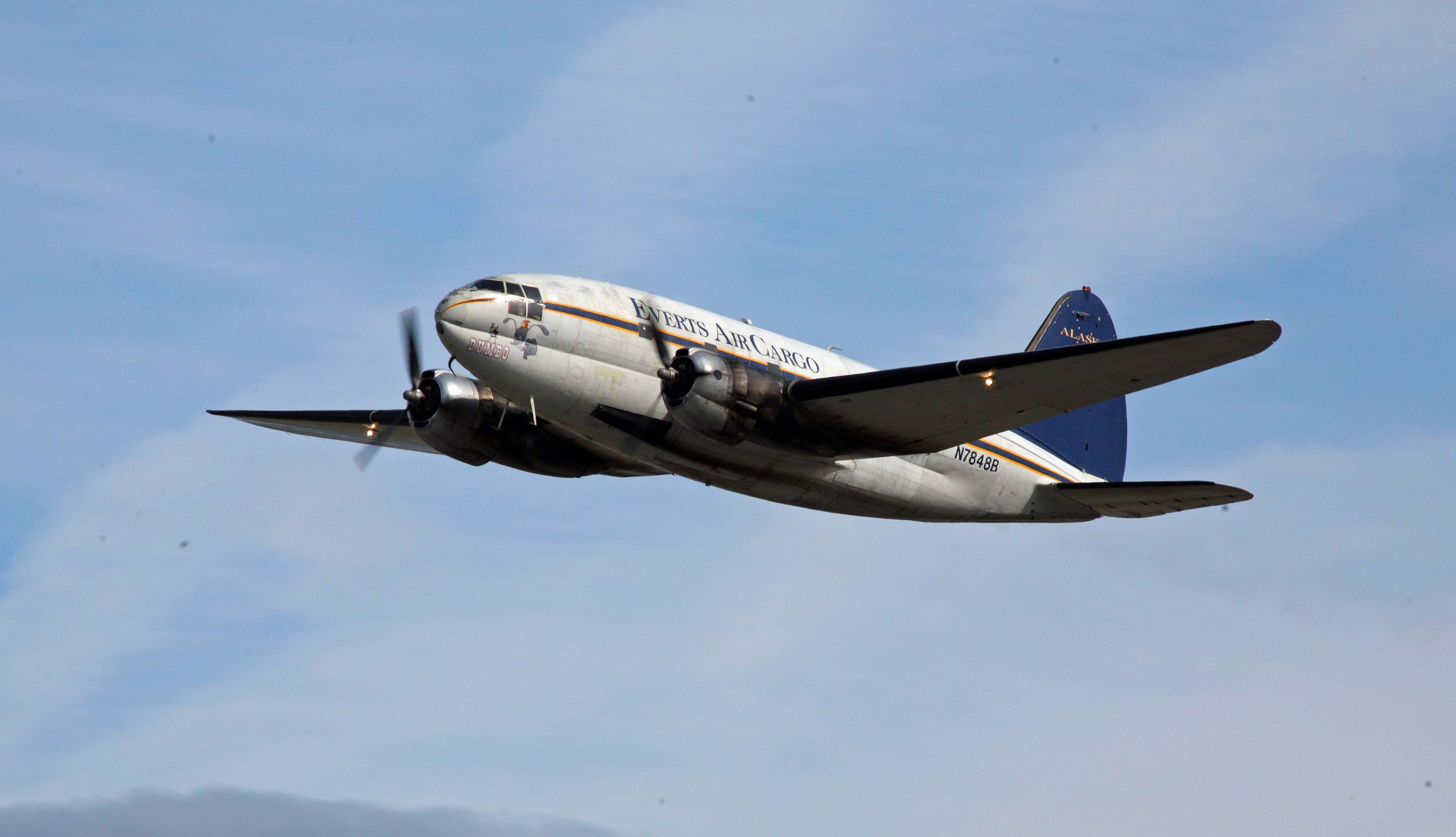
- Everts Air is one of the last C-46 operators globally
IATA	ICAO	Call sign
5V	VTS	EVERTS
- Founded: 1993; 33 years ago
- Hubs: Fairbanks
- Secondary hubs: Anchorage
- Subsidiaries: Zero Gravity Corporation
- Fleet size: 18 (active), 30 (total)
- Parent company: Tatonduk Outfitters Limited
- Headquarters: Fairbanks, Alaska, U.S.
- Website: evertsair.com

Everts Air Cargo is an American Part 121 airline based in Fairbanks, Alaska, United States. It operates D.O.D, scheduled and charter airline cargo within Alaska, Canada, Mexico, Caribbean Islands and the continental United States. Its maintenance base is Fairbanks International Airport with its major cargo hub at Ted Stevens Anchorage International Airport. The company slogan is Legendary Aircraft. Extraordinary Service.

== History ==
Everts Air Cargo, established as Air Cargo Express, is the sister company of Everts Air Fuel, that specializes in fuel transport throughout the state of Alaska and into Canada.

== Destinations ==
Everts Air operates to Anchorage, Aniak, Bethel, Dillingham, Fairbanks, Galena, King Salmon, Kotzebue, McGrath, Nome, Unalakleet

== Fleet ==
As of October 2022, the active Everts Air Cargo fleet includes eighteen aircraft:

Everts Air Cargo fleet
Aircraft	Total	Orders	Passenger	Notes
Cessna 172 Skyhawk	1	—	—	
BAE 146-300	2	—	—	
Cessna 208 Caravan	3	—	9	
Cessna 408 SkyCourier	—	3	Cargo	
Curtiss C-46 Commando	1	—	Cargo	
Douglas DC-6A	3	—	Cargo	
McDonnell Douglas MD-82SF	1	—	Cargo	
McDonnell Douglas MD-83SF	5	—	Cargo	
McDonnell Douglas MD-88SF	1	—	Cargo	
Pilatus PC-12	3	—	9	
Total	21	3		

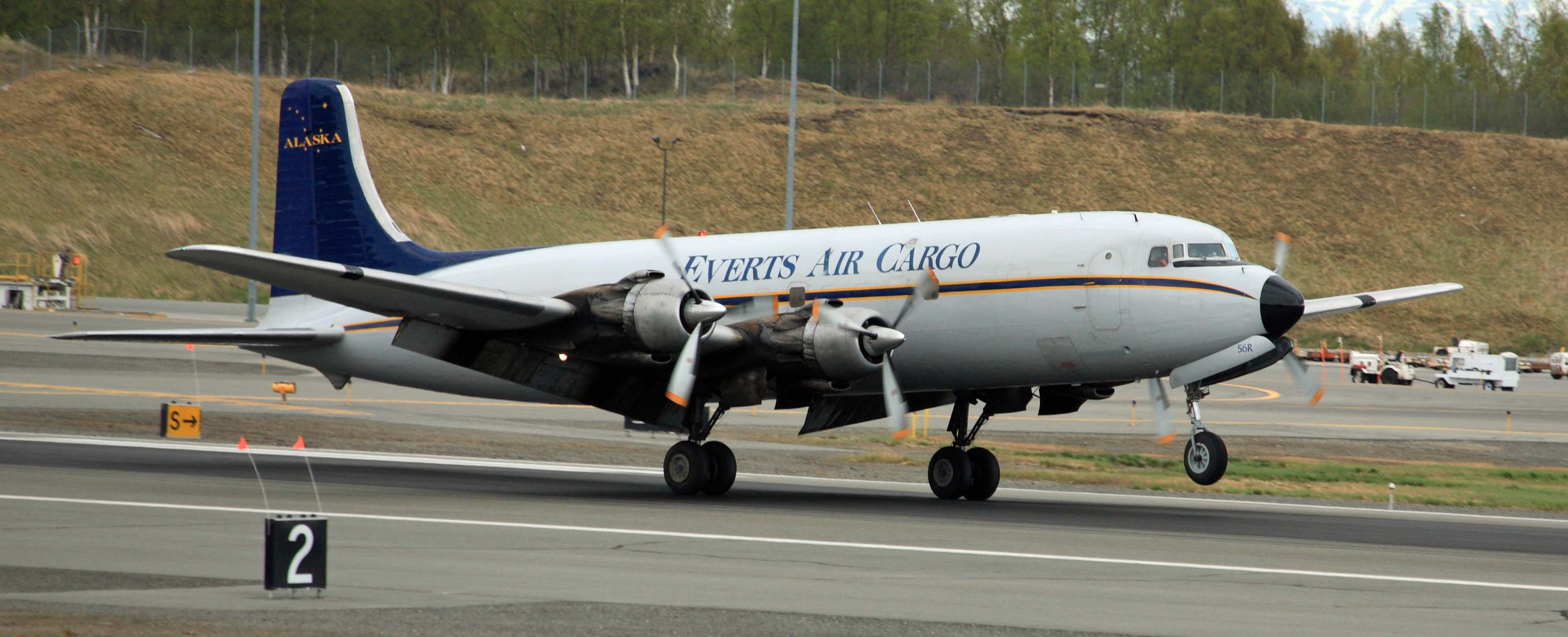
DC-6

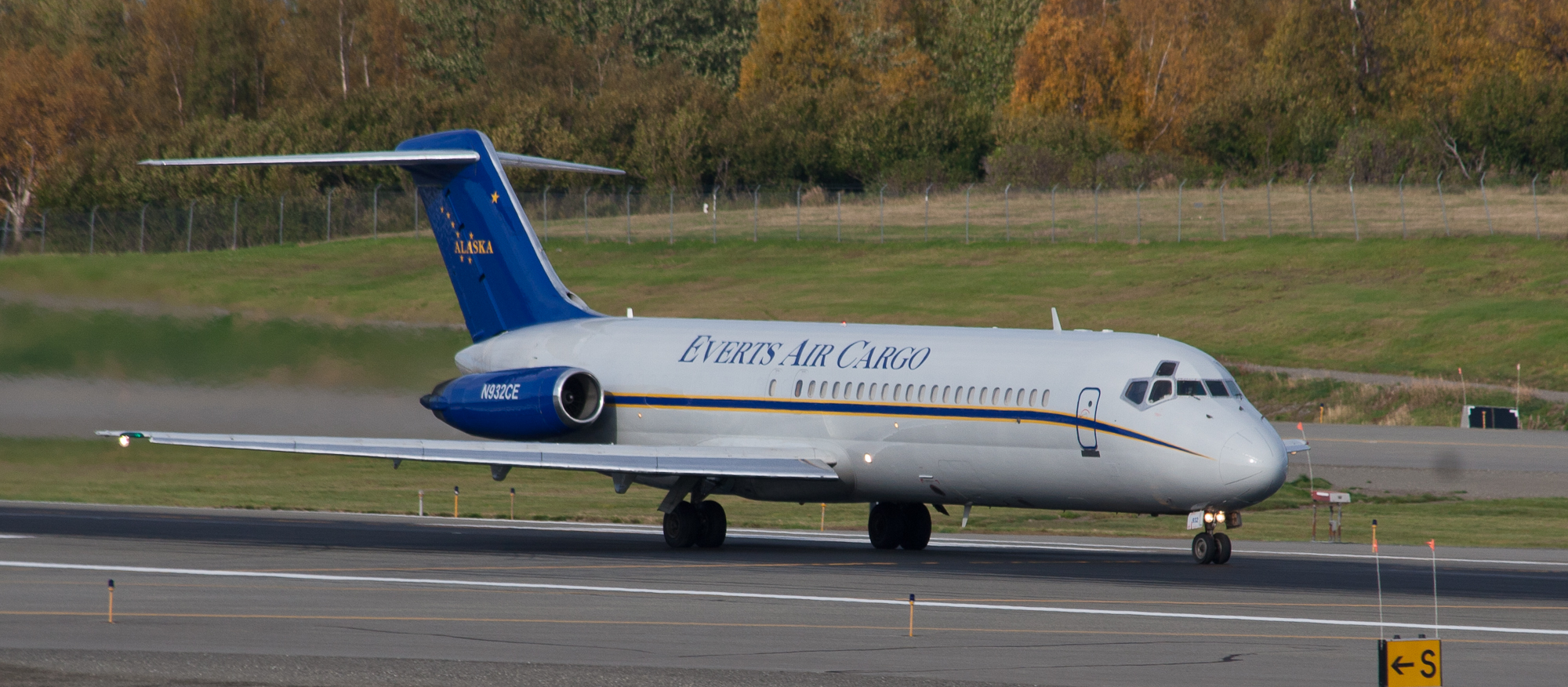
DC-9

A further fourteen aircraft (three DC-9, two MD-80, three BAe 146-300QT, six DC-6 and one C-46) are inactive or in storage.

== Operating the Douglas DC-6 ==
Since Northern Air Cargo abandoned their regular service with the Douglas DC-6, Everts Air Cargo is the last airline in the United States to operate scheduled flights with a rather large fleet of 60-year-old piston-powered aircraft. In a 2007 video interview, the Anchorage Station Manager stated that the DC-6 was still considered to be a valuable aircraft for operations in the harsh conditions of Alaska, with excellent landing and takeoff performance on gravel runways. The downside is the difficulty to find avgas and the maintenance labor cost. Everts Air Cargo estimates a ratio of 12 hours of maintenance for every single flying hour. Spare parts could also be a problem but Everts Air Cargo anticipates they will have enough in stock to keep the last DC-6 flying beyond 2025.
