= Douglas DC-6 =

US airliner with 4 piston engines, 1946

DC-6
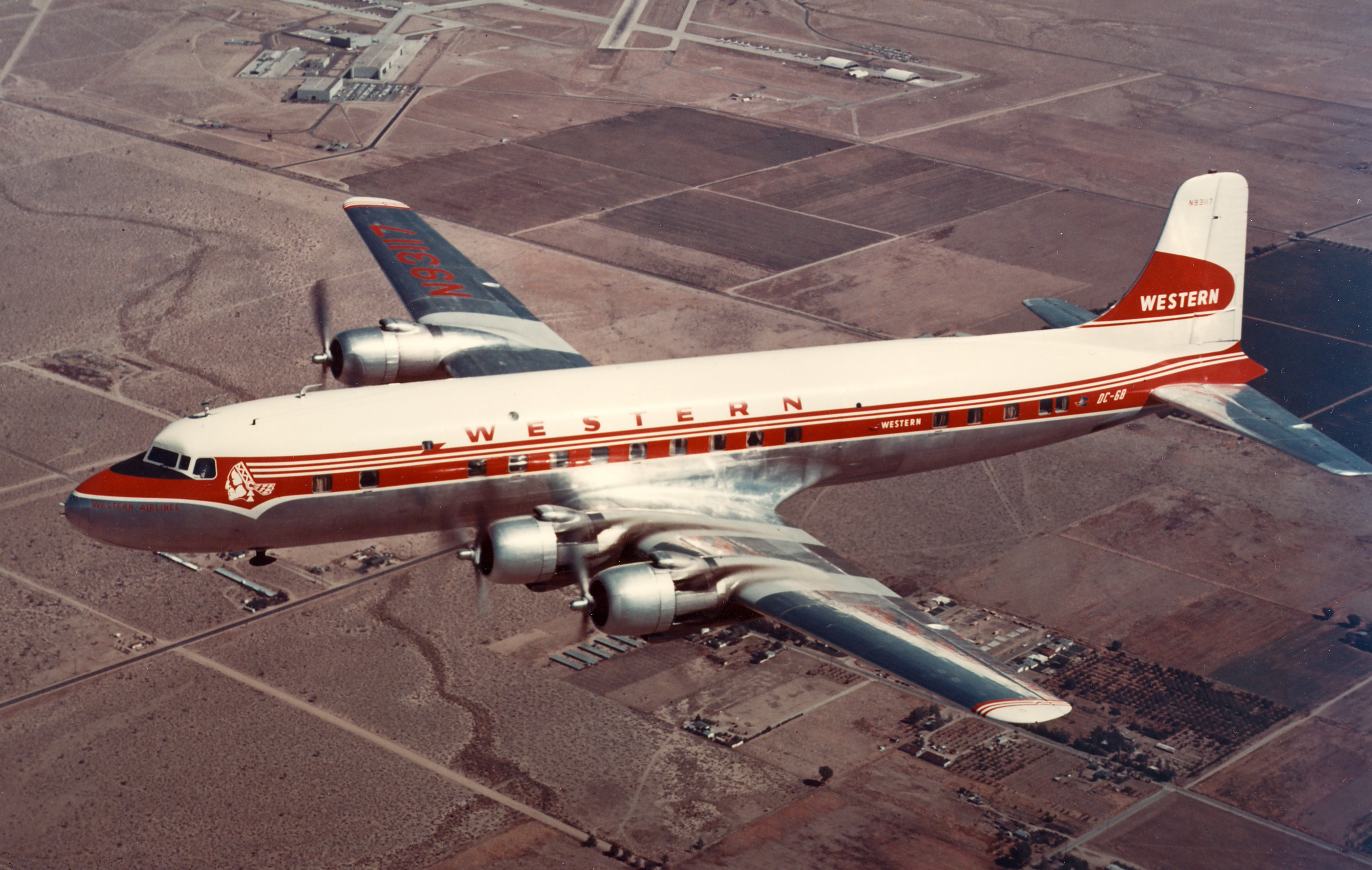
- A Douglas DC-6B of Western Airlines, 1956

General information
- Type: Airliner/transport aircraft
- Manufacturer: Douglas Aircraft Company
- Status: In limited service
- Primary users: Pan American World Airways Northwest Orient Airlines; Capital Airlines; Everts Air Cargo
- Number built: 704

History
- Manufactured: 1946–1958
- Introduction date: March 1947 with American Airlines and United Airlines
- First flight: February 15, 1946
- Developed from: Douglas DC-4
- Developed into: Douglas DC-7

The Douglas DC-6 is a piston-powered airliner and cargo aircraft built by the Douglas Aircraft Company from 1946 to 1958. Originally intended as a military transport near the end of World War II, Douglas reworked it after the war to compete with the Lockheed Constellation in the long-range commercial transport market. Douglas built over 700, and many still fly in cargo, military, and wildfire control roles.

The DC-6 was known as the C-118 Liftmaster in United States Air Force service and as the R6D in United States Navy service before 1962, after which all U.S. Navy variants were also designated as the C-118.

== Design and development ==
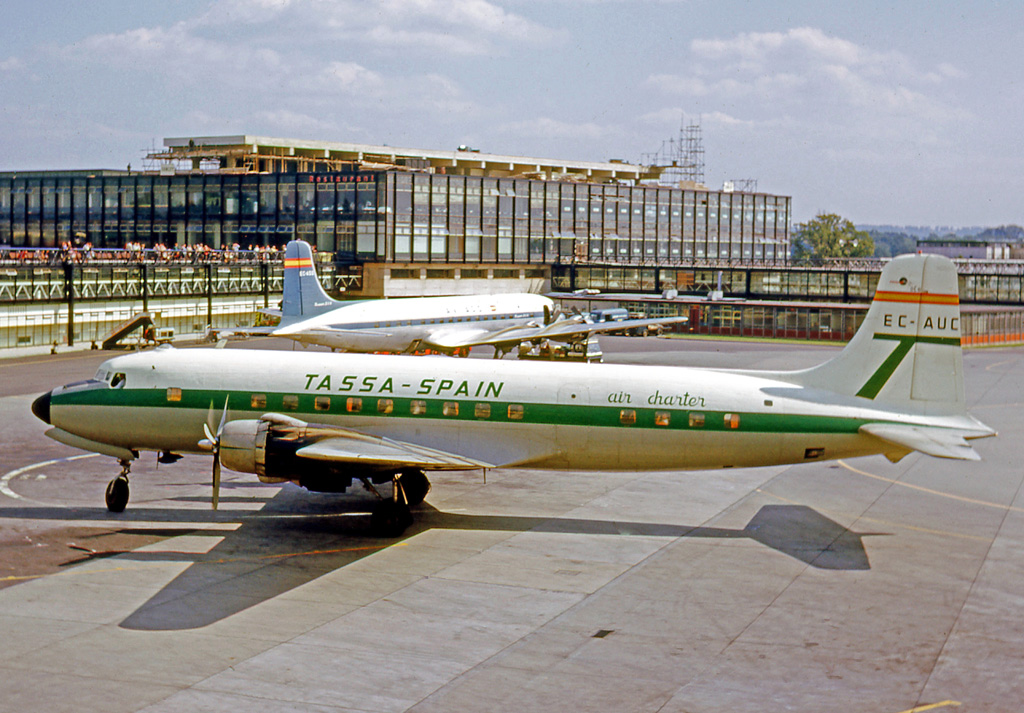
The prototype Douglas XC-112A, which first flew on February 15, 1946, converted to DC-6 standard in 1956 and flown by TASSA of Spain from 1963 until 1965

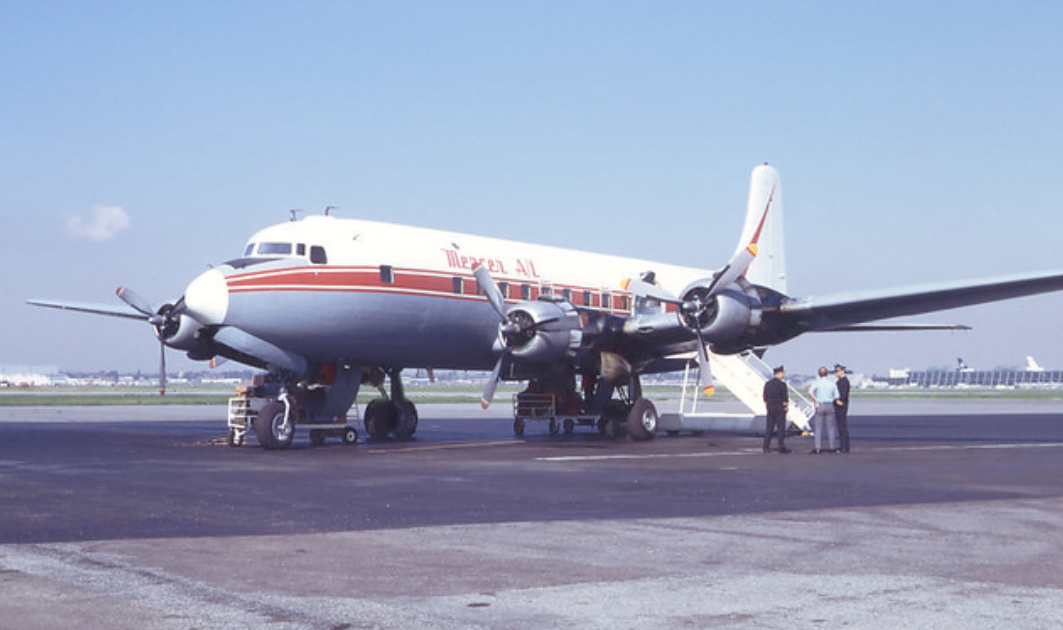
Same prototype in 1973 flying for Mercer Airlines, Long Beach. In 1976, this aircraft crashed on a golf course short of Van Nuys Airport near Los Angeles, killing all three cockpit crew.

The United States Army Air Forces (USAAF) commissioned the DC-6 project as the XC-112 in 1944. The USAAF wanted a lengthened, pressurized version of the DC-4-based C-54 Skymaster transport with more-powerful engines. By the time the prototype XC-112A flew on February 15, 1946, the war was over, the USAAF had rescinded its requirement, and the aircraft was converted to YC-112A, being sold in 1955.

Douglas Aircraft modified the design into a civilian transport 80 inches (2.0 m) longer than the DC-4, with a notable feature being the use of the Pratt & Whitney Double Wasp 18-cylinder radial engine, a powerplant that had seen considerable refinement and usage in World War II combat aircraft. The civilian DC-6 first flew on June 29, 1946, being retained by Douglas for testing. The first airline deliveries were to American Airlines and United Airlines on November 24, 1946. A series of inflight fires, one of which resulted in the fatal crash of United Airlines Flight 608, grounded the DC-6 fleet in 1947. The cause was found to be a fuel tank vent next to the cabin cooling turbine intake; all DC-6s were modified, and the fleet was back in service after four months on the ground.

== Operational history ==
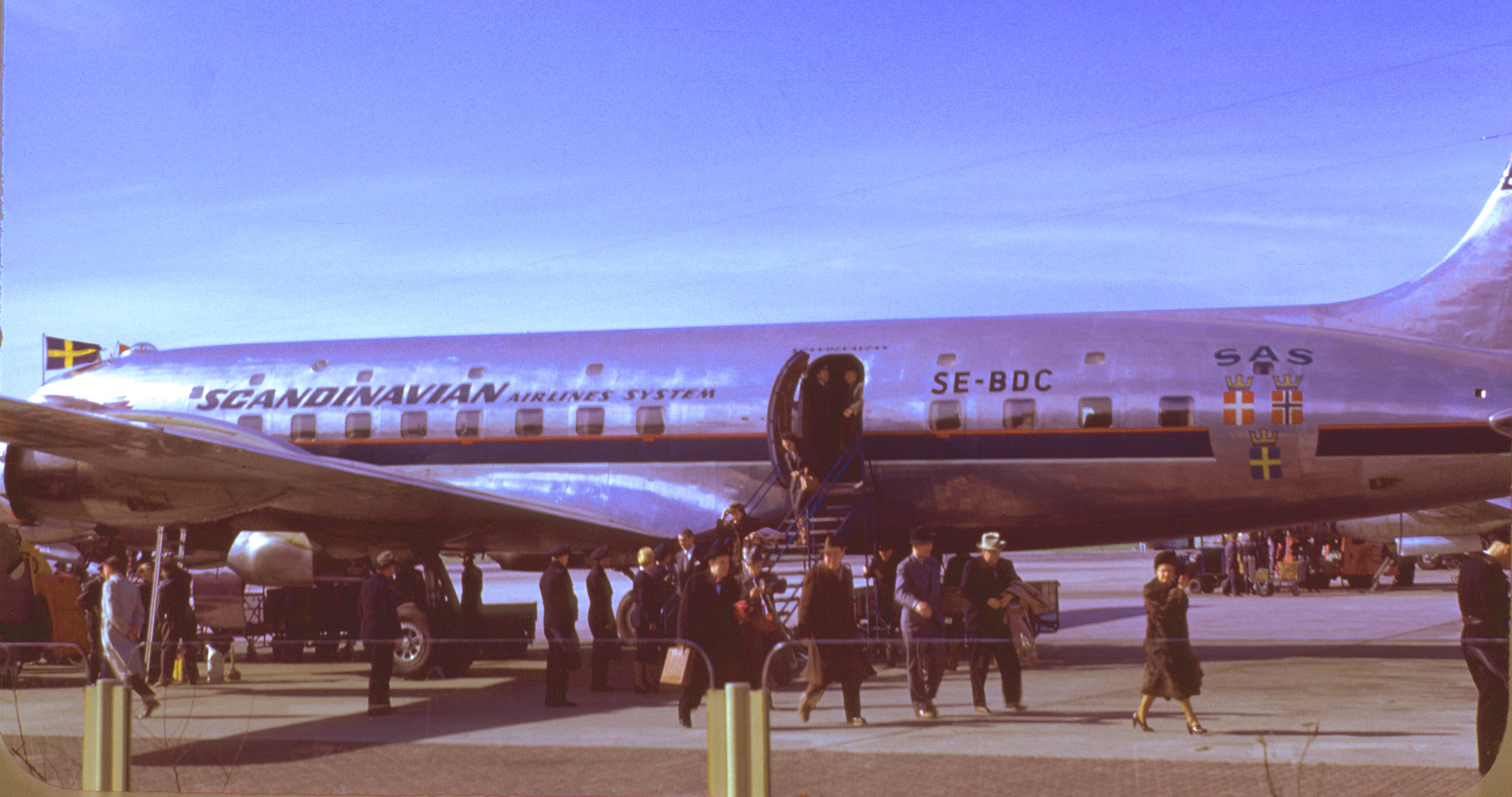
Passengers alighting from an SAS DC-6: Note the upper row of windows, indicating this was built as the optional sleeper variant of the original-length DC-6

Universal newsreel about the DC-6

In April 1949, United, American, Delta, National, and Braniff were flying DC-6s in the United States. United flew them to Hawaii, Braniff flew them to Rio de Janeiro, and Panagra flew Miami-Buenos Aires; KLM, SAS, and Sabena flew DC-6s across the Atlantic. BCPA DC-6s flew Sydney to Vancouver, and Philippine flew Manila to London and Manila to San Francisco.

Pan Am used DC-6Bs to start transatlantic tourist-class flights in 1952. These were the first DC-6Bs that could gross 107,000 lb (49,000 kg), with CB-17 engines rated at 2,500 hp (1,900 kW) on 108/135 octane fuel. Several European airlines followed with transatlantic services. The DC-6B and -6C subtypes could often fly nonstop from the eastern US to Europe, but needed to refuel in Goose Bay, Labrador, or Gander, Newfoundland, when flying westbound into prevailing westerly winds.

Douglas designed four variants of the DC-6 - the basic DC-6, and the longer-fuselage [60 in (150 cm)], higher-gross-weight, longer-range versions—the DC-6A with cargo doors forward and aft of the wing on the left side, with a cargo floor; the DC-6B for passenger work, with passenger doors only and a lighter floor; and the DC-6C convertible, with the two cargo doors and removable passenger seats.

The DC-6B, originally powered by Double Wasp engines with Hamilton Standard 43E60 constant-speed, reversing propellers, was regarded as the ultimate piston-engined airliner from the standpoint of ruggedness, reliability, economical operation, and handling qualities.

Similar to the DC-6A, the military version was the USAF C-118 Liftmaster; the USN R6D version used the more powerful R-2800-CB-17 engines. These were later used on the commercial DC-6B to allow international flights. The R6D Navy version (in the late 1950s and early 1960s) had Curtiss Electric constant-speed, reversing propellers.

The U.S. Air Force (USAF) and U.S. Navy (USN) renewed their interest in the DC-6 during the Korean War and ordered 167 C-118/R6D aircraft, some of which later found their way to civilian airlines. Harry Truman's first presidential aircraft was a USAF short-fuselage DC-6, which was designated VC-118 and named The Independence. It is preserved in the National Museum of the United States Air Force at Dayton, Ohio.

Total production of the DC-6 series was 704, including military versions.

In the 1960s, two DC-6s were used as transmitter platforms for educational television, based at Purdue University, in a program called the Midwest Program on Airborne Television Instruction.

Many older DC-6s were replaced in airline passenger service from the mid-1950s by the Douglas DC-7, but the simpler, more economical engines in the DC-6 have meant the type has outlived the DC-7, particularly for cargo operations. DC-6/7s surviving into the jet age were replaced in frontline intercontinental passenger service by the Boeing 707 and Douglas DC-8.

Basic prices of a new DC-6 in 1946–47 were around £210,000–£230,000 and had risen to £310,000 by 1951. By 1960, used prices were around £175,000 per aircraft. Prices for the DC-6A in 1957–58 were £460,000–£480,000. By 1960, used prices were around £296,000. Equivalent prices for the DC-6B in 1958 were around £500,000. Used prices in 1960 were around £227,000.

From 1977 to 1990, five yellow-painted Douglas DC-6Bs were used as water bombers in France by the Sécurité Civile. They were registered as F-ZBAC, F-ZBAD, F-ZBAE, F-ZBAP, and F-ZBBU.

== Variants ==
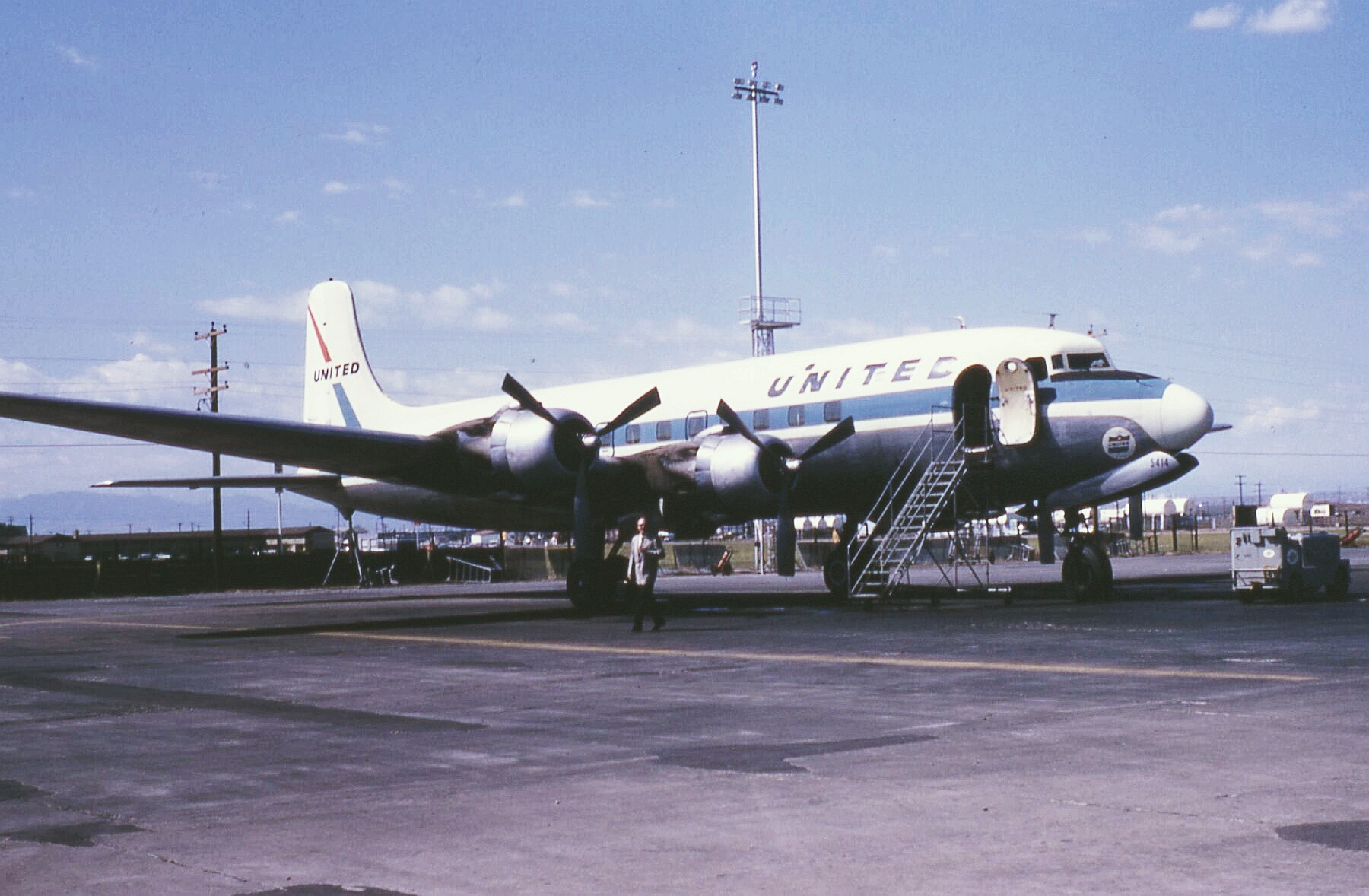
United Airlines DC-6 at Stapleton Airport, Denver, in 1966

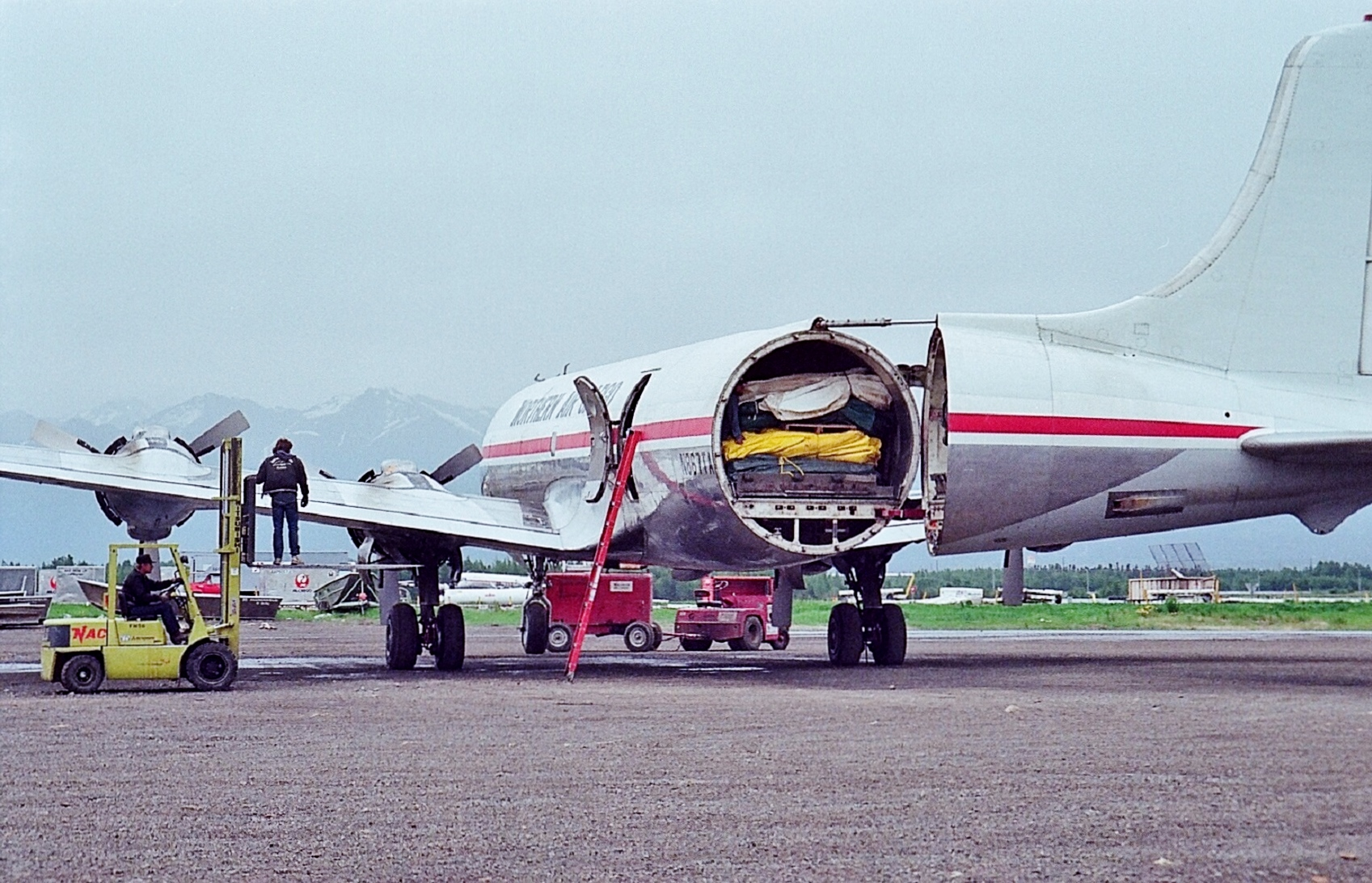
Northern Air Cargo operated one of only two DC-6s that had been converted to swing-tail configuration

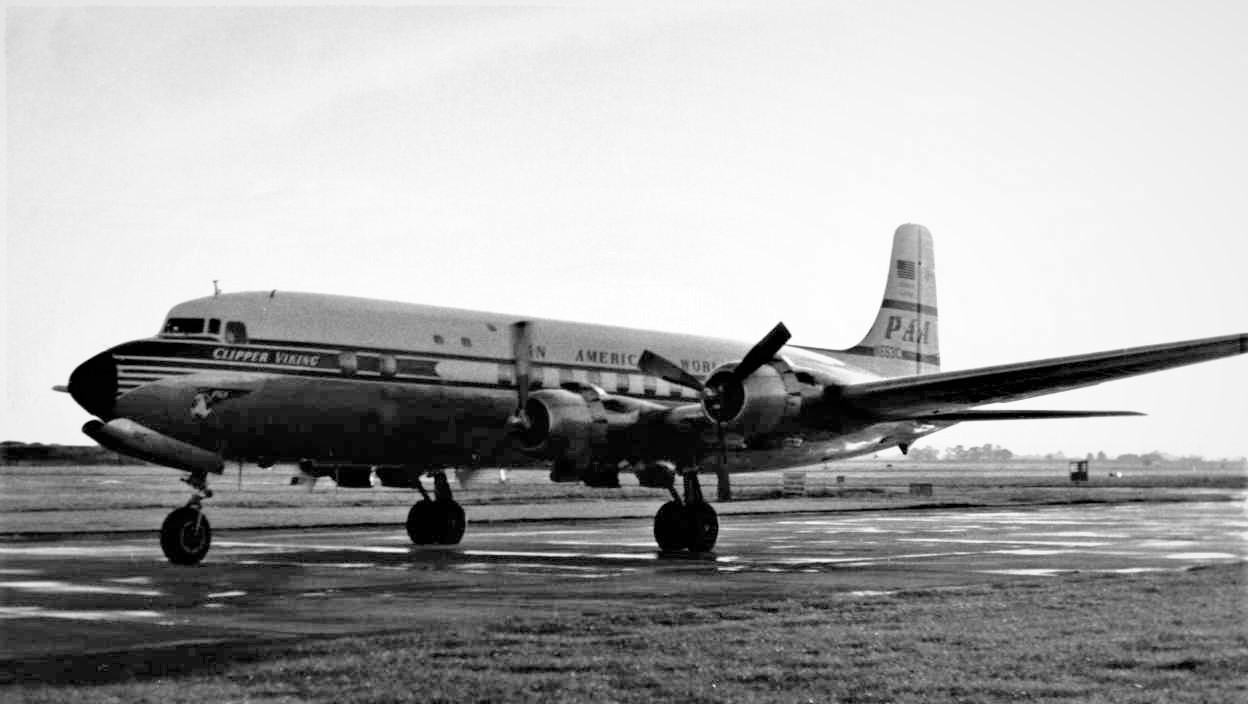
Pan Am DC-6B at London Heathrow in 1954 on a transatlantic tourist flight

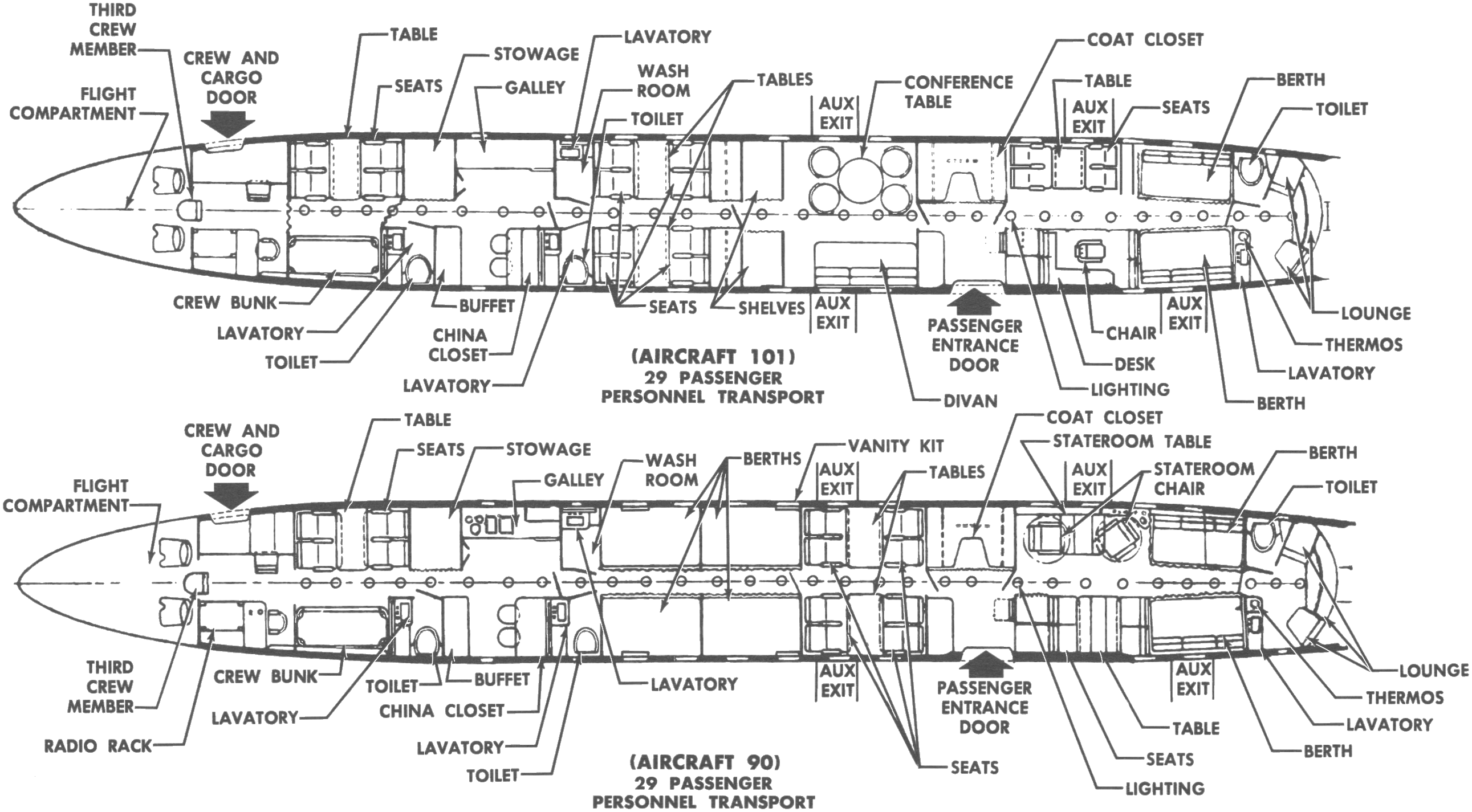
A cross-section of the VC-118A showing interior arrangements

XC-112A
United States military designation of an improved version of the C-54 (DC-4); became the prototype DC-6, eventually designated YC-112A, pressurized, P&W R-2800-83AM3 engines
DC-6
Initial production variant with shorter fuselage (100 ft 7 in) produced in two versions

DC-6-1156 a 53- to 68-seat domestic variant with 2,400 hp (1,800 kW) R-2800-CA15 engines
DC-6-1159 a 48- to 64-seat transoceanic variant with extra crew, increased fuel capacity to 4,722 US gallons (17,870 L; 3,932 imp gal), increased takeoff weight to 97,200 lb (44,100 kg), and 2,400 hp (1,800 kW) R-2800-CB16 engines.

DC-6A
Passenger/freighter variant; fuselage slightly lengthened from basic DC-6; fitted with cargo doors; some retained cabin windows and could be fitted with seats, while others had windows precluded and were only used for freight, originally called "Liftmaster" as USAF models; the rear cargo door came standard with a built-in 4,000 lb (1,800 kg) lift elevator and a Jeep. The Jeep was a public-relations stunt and shortly after, was dropped. Slick Airways was the first airline to operate the freighter variant in April 1951.
DC-6B
All-passenger variant of DC-6A, without cargo door

DC-6B-1198A a 60- to 89-seat domestic variant with 2,400 hp (1,800 kW) R-2800-CB16 engines
DC-6B-1225A a 42- to 89-seat transoceanic variant with an increased fuel capacity to 5,512 US gal (20,870 L; 4,590 imp gal), increased takeoff weight to 107,000 lb (49,000 kg), and 2,500 hp (1,900 kW) R-2800-CB17 engines

DC-6B-ST
Swing-tail freighter conversion to the DC-6B done by Sabena; two converted, only one survives currently stored with Buffalo Airways
DC-6C
Convertible cargo/passenger variant
VC-118
One-off USAF presidential transport used by Harry S Truman, from 1947–53, with special 25-seat interior and 12 beds. Named the Independence, this aircraft has been restored to original configuration and is now on display at Wright-Patterson AFB, Dayton, Ohio.
C-118A
Designation of DC-6As for the USAF, 101 built
VC-118A
C-118As converted as staff transports
C-118B
R6D-1s redesignated
VC-118B
R6D-1Zs redesignated
R6D-1
USN designation for the DC-6A, 65 built
R6D-1Z
Four R6D-1s converted as staff transports

== Operators ==
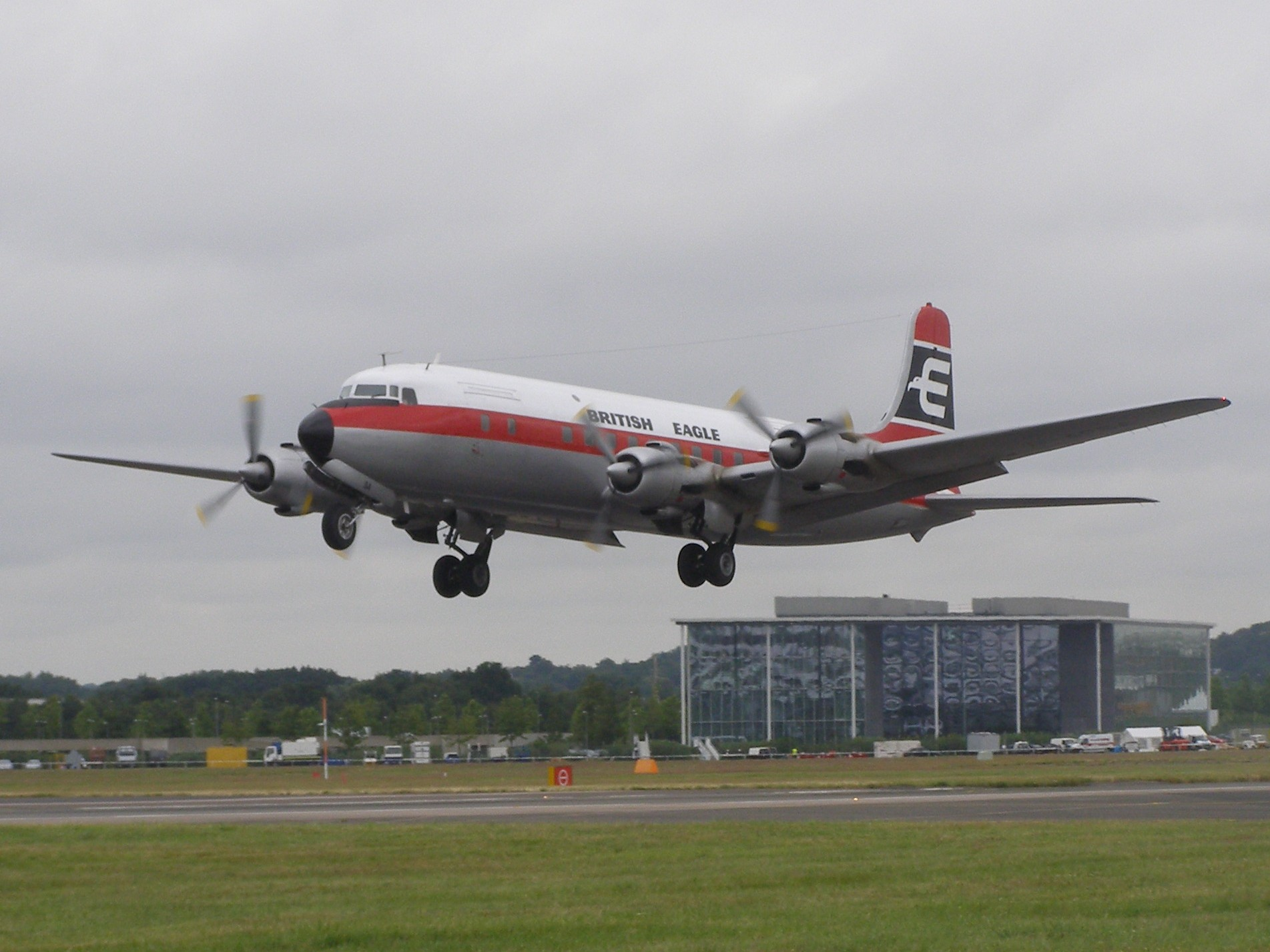
G-APSA in British Eagle scheme

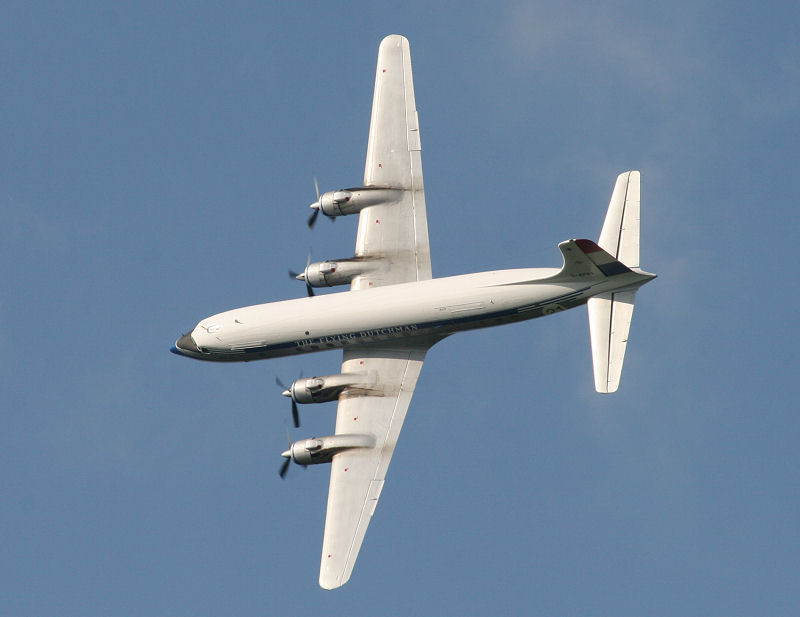
G-APSA displaying at Hamburg

=== Current operators ===
Today, most DC-6s are inactive, stored, or preserved in museums. Several DC-6s fly in northern bush operations in Alaska, while several are based in Europe, and a few are still in operation for small carriers in South America.

- One DC-6A, G-APSA, is based in the UK and available for private charter. It was painted in British Eagle colours and appeared at many air displays. The aircraft was disassembled in 2018. It had been grounded at Coventry for some time due to wing spar issues, which proved beyond economic repair. The parts of the airframe were taken to the South Wales Aviation Museum in the spring of 2021, where it will be restored and reassembled to go on display. Another DC-6B (G-SIXC ex-Air Atlantique) was converted to a restaurant some years ago but was reported to have closed in 2017. It was also moved to St Athan with G-APSA, but was advertised for sale in August 2021.
- One DC-6B is in use by the Flying Bulls Aerobatics Team in Salzburg, Austria.
- One DC-6B V5-NCG Bateleur was in use with Namibia Commercial Aviation. It was stored and derelict in Windhoek by Jan 2017.
- As of July 2016, Everts Air Cargo in Alaska operates 11 DC-6s and two C-46s, with several more in storage. Their sister company, Everts Air Fuel, operates three DC-6s and two C-46s.

=== Former operators ===
Many airlines and air forces from several countries once included the DC-6 in their fleets; these are further detailed in the list of Douglas DC-6 operators. In the 1980s, several DC-6Bs were used as fire-retardant tankers by Conair Aerial Firefighting of Abbotsford, Canada. Douglas sold the last aircraft to Everts Air Cargo in Fairbanks, Alaska, in the late 2000s.

== Surviving aircraft ==
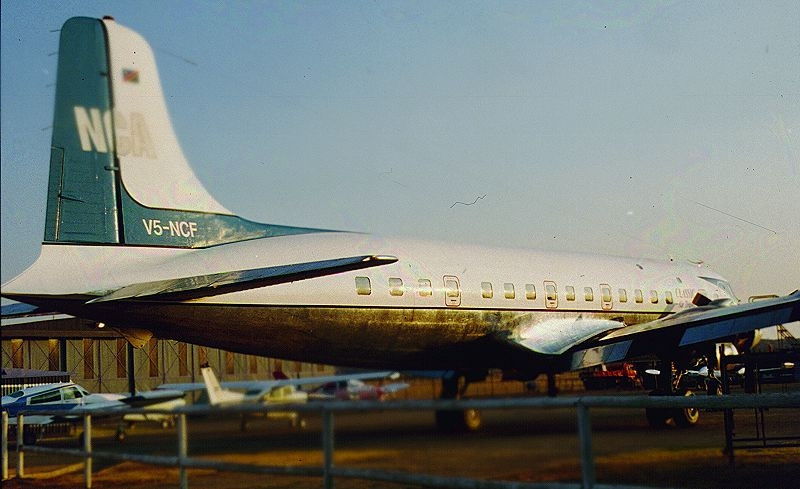
Douglas DC-6B, c/n 45563, V5-NCF, 1995. Now owned by the Flying Bulls Aerobatics Team

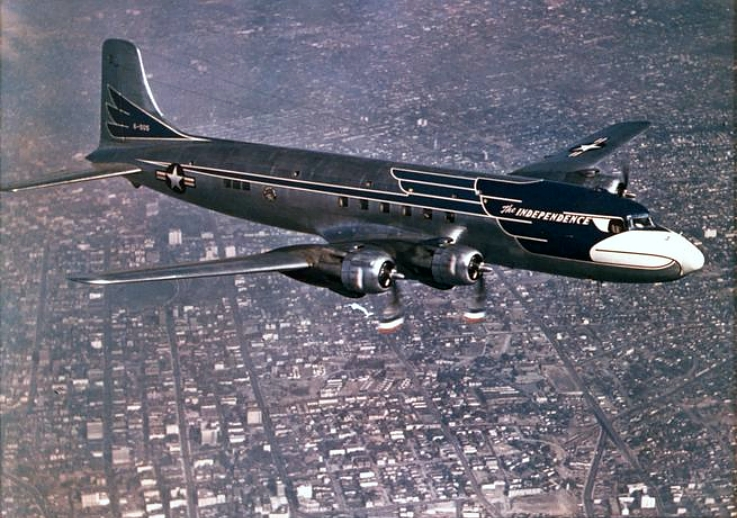
Harry Truman's VC-118, The Independence

=== Austria ===
- c/n 45563 – DC-6B airworthy with the Flying Bulls Aerobatics Team in Salzburg, Austria. This aircraft was once the private luxury transport of Yugoslav President Josip Broz Tito.

=== Canada ===
- N434TA - DC-6BF/ST, ST for 'Swing Tail' in storage at Hay River/Merlyn Carter Airport in Hay River, Northwest Territories. Owned by Buffalo Airways.

=== Colombia ===
- Two DC-6s are in storage at Alfonso Bonilla Aragón International Airport of Cali, Valle del Cauca. They belonged to Aerosur, a defunct Colombian airline.

=== Germany ===
- One D-ABAH

The aircraft is reportedly the oldest surviving DC-6 and the fourth one ever built. Constructed in 1946, it first served the Jordanian royal family, then operated US scheduled flights, and arrived in Germany in 1965, where it flew until the end of the decade. After being decommissioned in 1969, it was sold to a private individual, who turned it into an aircraft-themed café. Following a period being parked in an industrial area, it was sold for a symbolic one euro to Johannes Mönter, owner of Sanicare. In 2003, with sponsor support, it was transported to Bad Laer and restored. Known there as the "Sanicare Aircraft", it sits on a health center's grounds to symbolize modern mail-order pharmacy logistics. The plane is used for seminars and events, can be rented for special occasions, and even serves as a civilian registry office. In autumn 2019, it was repainted with the inscription "Bad Laer CENTER".

=== Namibia ===
- c/n 45564 – DC-6B airworthy with Namibia Commercial Aviation in Windhoek, Khomas.

=== Norway ===
- c/n 45496 – DC-6B is on static display at the Flyhistorisk Museum, Sola in Sola, Rogaland.

=== Slovenia ===
c/n 43553 (YU-AFF) – DC-6B on static display at Ljubljana Airport.

=== South Africa ===
- c/n 45329 – DC-6B is on static display near Pretoria, Gauteng

=== Taiwan ===
- 18351 "Chung Mei" – DC-6B on static display at the Republic of China Air Force Museum in Gangshan, Kaohsiung. It served as a presidential aircraft from 1949 to December 1972 and army general aircraft until retired in December 1978.

=== United States ===
- 46-0505 Independence – VC-118 is on static display at the National Museum of the United States Air Force at Wright-Patterson AFB in Dayton, Ohio. This aircraft served as President Harry S. Truman's personal aircraft until he left office in 1953. It later served as a VIP aircraft for other USAF personnel before retiring to the museum in 1965.
- 51-17651 – C-118A is on static display at the Travis Air Force Base Aviation Museum at Travis Air Force Base in Fairfield, California. This aircraft served first in the USAF and was later transferred to the USN as Bureau Number 131602.
- 53-3240 – VC-118A is on static display at the Pima Air and Space Museum in Tucson, Arizona. This aircraft served as President John F. Kennedy's Air Force One until 1962, when it was replaced as the primary presidential aircraft by VC-137C SAM 26000 and relegated to use as the backup presidential aircraft. It was the last propeller-driven aircraft to serve in the presidential fleet.
- 53-3255 – C-118A is on static display at Joint Base McGuire-Dix-Lakehurst, New Jersey. Elvis Presley returned to the United States in this aircraft after serving in the US Army in Germany. As of October 2009, it was being restored.
- 53-3304 – VC-118A is on static display in Big Lake, Alaska. It has been converted into a cabin.
- BuNo 128424 – VC-118B is on static display at the National Naval Aviation Museum at Naval Air Station Pensacola in Pensacola, Florida. It was built in 1951.
- c/n 44075 Good Grief – DC-6A is on static display in Chena Hot Springs, Alaska. It was flown to the resort by Everts Air Cargo on October 2, 2016, after a 62-year flight career.

=== United Kingdom ===
- c/n 45550 – DC-6 on static display at Coventry Airport at Baginton, United Kingdom. Built in September 1958, this aircraft spent most of its life in Southeast Asia, and after serving with the CIA and Royal Air Lao, Air Atlantique Group bought it in 1987. Its last commercial flight was on October 26, 2004. It was featured in the 2006 James Bond film Casino Royale. No longer flying, it was converted into a static restaurant at Coventry airport, the "DC-6 Diner".
- c/n 45497 – DC-6A on static display at the South Wales Aviation Museum in St Athan, Vale of Glamorgan.

== Specifications ==
Douglas DC-6

Comparison of models
| Variant | DC-6 | DC-6A | DC-6B |
|---|---|---|---|
| Crew | Three to four | | |
| Capacity | 48-68 passengers | 28,188 lb (12,786 kg) of cargo | 42-89 passengers |
| Length | 100 ft 7 in (30.66 m) | 105 ft 7 in (32.18 m) | |
| Wingspan | 117 ft 6 in (35.81 m) | | |
| Height | 28 ft 5 in (8.66 m) | | |
| Wing area | 1,463 sq ft (135.9 m^{2}) | | |
| Empty weight | 52,567 lb (23,844 kg) | 45,862 lb (20,803 kg) | 55,357 lb (25,110 kg) |
| Max takeoff weight | 97,200 lb (44,100 kg) | 107,200 lb (48,600 kg) | 107,000 lb (49,000 kg) |
| Powerplant (4x) | Pratt & Whitney R-2800-CA15 "Double Wasp" radial engine, 2,400 hp (1,800 kW) with water injection each | Pratt & Whitney R-2800-CB16 "Double Wasp" radial engine, 2,400 hp (1,800 kW) with water injection each | Pratt & Whitney R-2800-CB17 "Double Wasp" radial engine, 2,500 hp (1,900 kW) with water injection each |
| Propellers | Hamilton Standard 43E60 "Hydromatic" constant-speed props with autofeather and reverse thrust | | |
| Cruise speed | 311 mph (270 kn; 501 km/h) | 315 mph (274 kn; 507 km/h) | |
| Fuel capacity | 4,260 US gal (16,100 L; 3,550 imp gal); 4,722 US gal (17,870 L; 3,932 imp gal) | | up to 5,512 US gal (20,870 L; 4,590 imp gal) |
| Range | 3,983 nmi (4,584 mi; 7,377 km) | 2,948 nmi (3,392 mi; 5,460 km) Max payload 4,317 nmi (4,968 mi; 7,995 km) Max fuel | 2,610 nmi (3,000 mi; 4,830 km) Max payload 4,100 nmi (4,700 mi; 7,600 km) Max fuel |
| Service ceiling | | 21,900 ft (6,700 m) | 25,000 ft (7,600 m) |
| Rate of climb | 1,070 ft/min (330 m/min) | | |

== See also ==
Related development

- Canadair North Star – Canadian airliner with 4 piston engines, 1946
- Douglas DC-4 – Four-engine propeller-driven airliner
- Douglas DC-7 – US airliner with 4 piston engines, 1953

Aircraft of comparable role, configuration, and era

- Boeing 377 Stratocruiser – US airliner with 4 piston engines, 1947
- Handley Page Hermes – Civilian airliner
- Lockheed Constellation – Family of US airliners with 4 piston engines, 1943
- Lockheed L-049 Constellation – US airliner with 4 piston engines, 1943
- Lockheed L-1049 Super Constellation – US airliner with 4 piston engines, 1951
- Lockheed L-1649 Starliner – US airliner with 4 piston engines, 1956

Related lists

- List of military aircraft of the United States
- List of United States Navy aircraft designations (pre-1962)
