= Naturelink Aviation =

Naturelink
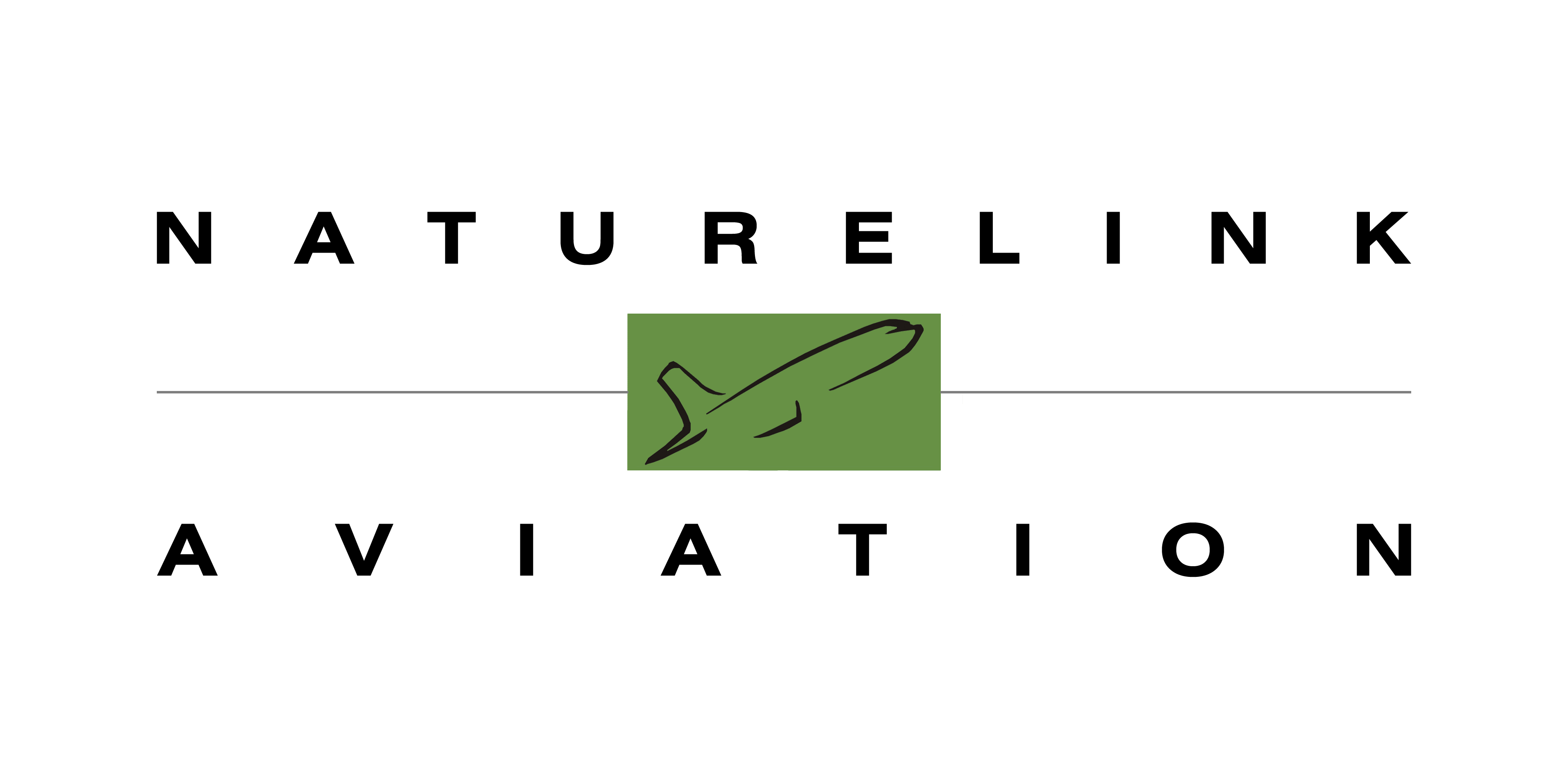
IATA	ICAO	Call sign
-	NRK	NATURELINK
- Founded: 1997
- Ceased operations: 2011 (merged into National Airways Corporation)
- Operating bases: Wonderboom Airport
- Headquarters: Pretoria, South Africa
- Website: naturelink.co.za (defunct)

Naturelink Aviation, also known as Naturelink Charter, was an airline from South Africa, which offered corporate and private charter flights, as well as worldwide aircraft lease services. The company was based at Wonderboom Airport in Pretoria.

== History ==
Naturelink Aviation was founded in 1997 by Chris Briers. In mid-2004, 60 percent of the shares were acquired by Safair, through Imperial Holdings. As Naturelink operated charter flights to possibly unsafe regions like Iraq or Afghanistan, the company participated in the testing of CAMPS, a countermeasure against portable anti-aircraft missiles developed by Saab.

In September 2008, Naturelink was purchased by Runway Assets Management. Another change of ownership happened in 2010 through the acquisition by National Airways Corporation. Subsequently, Naturelink's fleet and operations were gradually merged into the Lanseria-based company. By mid-2011, this transition had been completed, and the Naturelink brand was shut down.

== Fleet ==
The fleet of eight Embraer EMB 120 Brasilia that formed the backbone of the Naturelink fleet were transferred to National Airways upon takeover. Over the years, Naturelink also operated the larger aircraft types Boeing 727, 737-200, Douglas DC-3 and DC-9, as well as smaller airplanes like Embraer EMB 110 Bandeirante, Cessna 208, PAC 750XL or Socata TBM.

== Accidents ==
- On 1 October 2004, a Naturelink Embraer EMB 110 Bandeirante (registered ZS-OWO) crashed when, during take-off from Douala International Airport in Cameroon, control was lost following an engine failure. The airplane was destroyed, but the four occupants survived the accident.
