= FLYeasy =

Indian airline

IATA	ICAO	Call sign
N5	FEY	FLYEASY
- Founded: 2014
- Ceased operations: 2015 (not launched)
- Hubs: Kempegowda International Airport (Bangalore)
- Fleet size: 1
- Parent company: ABC Aviation and Training Services Pvt. Ltd.
- Headquarters: Airline Building, Bangalore Airport
- Key people
- Website: FlyEasyIndia

FLYeasy was an Indian low-cost airline based at Kempegowda International Airport, Bengaluru. The company slogan is When You Value Time and Money.

== Fleet ==
They planned to lease one Embraer E190s.

== Mergers and acquisitions ==
In December 2017, FLYeasy purchased 74% of Air Pegasus, a defunct regional airline, for over ₹70 crore.

== Controversy ==
The airline was accused of fraud and 'cheating' by numerous young pilots who claim that they were promised jobs by FLYeasy.
