= Nayzak Air Transport =

IATA	ICAO	Call sign
M4	NZA	NAYZAK AIR
- Hubs: Tripoli International Airport
- Fleet size: 2
- Headquarters: Tripoli, Libya
- Website: http://www.nayzak.ly/

Nayzak Air Transport (Arabic: النيزك للنقل الجوي) was an airline based in Tripoli, Libya. Its main base is Tripoli International Airport.

== Destinations ==
Nayzak Air Transport operates the following services (as of July 2009):

- Libya
  - Bayda (La Abraq Airport)
  - Benghazi (Benina International Airport)
  - Kufra (Kufra Airport)
  - Sabha (Sabha Airport)
  - Tripoli (Tripoli International Airport)
- Tunisia
  - Tunis (Tunis-Carthage International Airport)
- United Kingdom
  - Manchester (Manchester Airport)

== Fleet ==
The Nayzak Air Transport fleet includes the following aircraft (as of 19 July 2009) :

- 2 Boeing 737-400 (which are operated by Czech Airlines)
