= Nord-Flyg =

Swedish airline

IATA	ICAO	Call sign
-	NEF	NORDEX
- Founded: 1955; 71 years ago
- Hubs: Eskilstuna Airport
- Fleet size: 4
- Headquarters: Eskilstuna, Sweden
- Website: nordflyg.se

Nord-Flyg is a Swedish cargo and passenger charter airline based at Eskilstuna, Sweden. Formed in 1955 as an air taxi operator it was a launch customer for a cargo conversion of the Bombardier Dash 8 Q400.

== Fleet ==
Nord-Flyg fleet
Aircraft		Note
Cessna Grand Commander	SE-LSK	In operation as of November 2019
Cessna Grand Commander	SE-LSL	Exported to Israel in 2012
Bombardier Dash 8 Q400PF	SE-LSM	Exported to Kenya in December 2011
