= Nordic Regional =

Swedish regional airline, 2004–2008

IATA	ICAO	Call sign
6N	NRD	NORTH RIDER
- Founded: 2004
- Ceased operations: 2008
- Hubs: Stockholm-Arlanda Airport
- Fleet size: 1
- Destinations: 6
- Parent company: Nordic Airways
- Headquarters: Umeå, Sweden
- Key people: Gunnar Olsson, Managing Director
- Website: http://www.nordicregional.se/

Nordic Regional was an airline based in Umeå, Sweden. It operated a scheduled network of services linking one international and five domestic destinations. Its main base was Stockholm-Arlanda Airport.

All operations were cancelled in 2008.

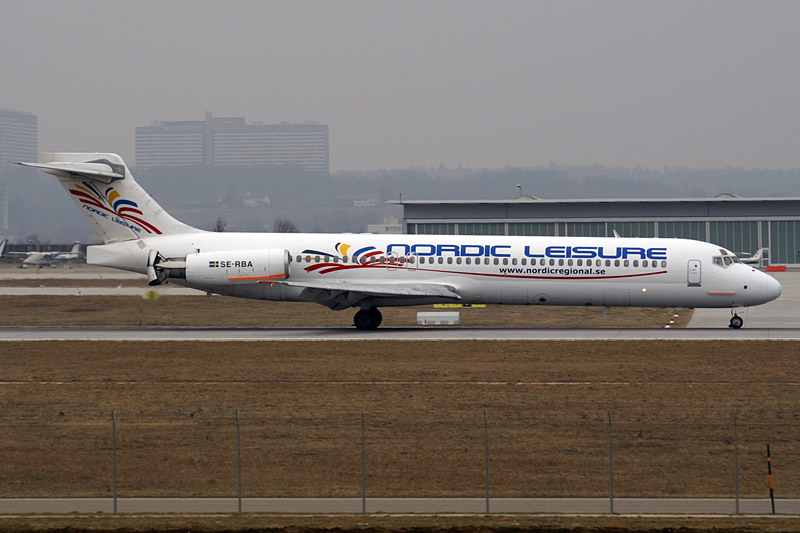

== Destinations ==
Nordic Airways served the following Swedish airports in 2008: Gällivare Airport, Kramfors Airport, Luleå Airport, Åre Östersund Airport, Stockholm-Arlanda Airport, and Umeå Airport.

== Fleet ==
The Nordic Regional fleet included the following aircraft (as of 8 September 2008)

- 1 Saab 340A
