= Namibia Commercial Aviation =

Namibian airline, 1992–2010

IATA	ICAO	Call sign
-	-	-
- Operating bases: Windhoek Eros Airport
- Fleet size: One Douglas DC-6
- Headquarters: Windhoek, Namibia
- Key people: Chris Schutte

Namibia Commercial Aviation (NCA) was a Namibia-based charter airline that operated a Douglas DC-6B. The airline operated sightseeing charters. The airline was based at Windhoek Eros Airport.

== History ==
The predecessor airline of NCA was Hire and Fly, which was founded in 1977. Chris Schutte, a former station engineer with South African Airways, founded Hire & Fly, which operated single and twin-engine Cessna aircraft.

In 1989, Hire and Fly expanded by taking over the Cessna fleet of Namib Air (now Air Namibia). By 1992, the airline was operating seven Cessna 210s and up to eight twin-engined Cessna 310s when the company changed its name to Namibia Commercial Aviation.

=== Acquiring the Douglas DC-6A ===
In December 1990, the company received a contract from the United Nations to provide airlift to war-torn Angola. The company acquired a Douglas DC-6A, which it registered as V5-NCB and started to fly it by June 1991. A second DC-6A was acquired in September 1991. Both of these were leased to a Zairean airline in October 1993, though one was repossessed the following year and sold.

=== Historic Douglas DC-6B aircraft acquired ===
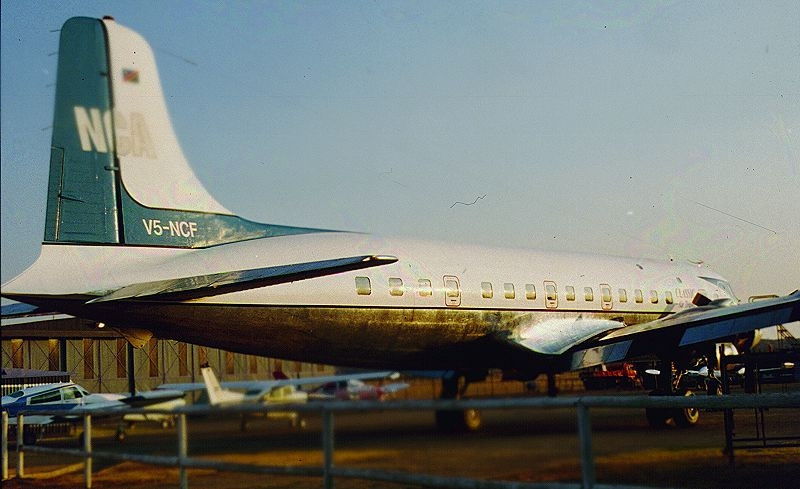
V5-NCF at Eros Airport in 1995

In September 1992, NCA purchased 40 tons of spare DC-6 parts from the Zambian Air Force. The sale was contingent on purchasing two DC-6B which had been parked for 15 years. These two were eventually registered in Namibia as V5-NCF and V5-NCG.

V5-NCF had a manufacturer’s serial number of 45563, the second to last DC-6B serial number although it was the fourth to last DC-6B delivery, which took place in January 1958. It served as the presidential plane to then Yugoslavian President Josip Broz Tito, who used it on a state visit to India in January 1959. Later, it served as the personal transport for then Zambian President Kenneth Kaunda. V5-NCF’s first revenue flight after restoration took place on March 20, 1995.

V5-NCF is no longer operated by NCA having been sold to pay for the restoration of V5-NCG. The aircraft formerly registered as V5-NCF is now based in Austria sporting the Red Bull livery.

V5-NCG was restored by NCA and was first operated on a revenue flight on March 31, 2001. The aircraft was the last Douglas DC-6B built.
