= Transwede Airways (2005–2010) =

Swedish charter airline (2005–2010)

Transwede Airways AB
IATA	ICAO	Call sign
5T	TWE	TRANSWEDE
- Founded: 2005
- Ceased operations: 31 March 2010
- Hubs: Göteborg Landvetter Airport
- Fleet size: 6
- Destinations: 6
- Parent company: Braathens Aviation
- Headquarters: Gothenburg, Sweden
- Key people: Trygve Gjertsen (CEO)
- Website: transwede.com

Transwede Airways AB was a charter airline based at Göteborg Landvetter Airport in Landvetter, Härryda Municipality, near Gothenburg. Transwede operated flights on wet lease agreements from London City Airport, as well as charter flights. The company was owned by Braathens Aviation. Transwede Airways had appointed a new CEO, Trygve Gjertsen, who started on 1 January 2007, taking over from Jimmie Bergqvist.

The inaugural flight from Stockholm-Arlanda Airport to London City Airport, numbered SK517, took place on 13 February 2006 under Scandinavian Airlines colors. This gave way to two daily flights, numbered SK517/518 and SK529/530, with the new Transwede livery, which is a variation of Malmö's.

As of 31 March 2010 the airline has decided that all activities in the company will end as Transwede has not been operating during 2010.

== Destinations ==
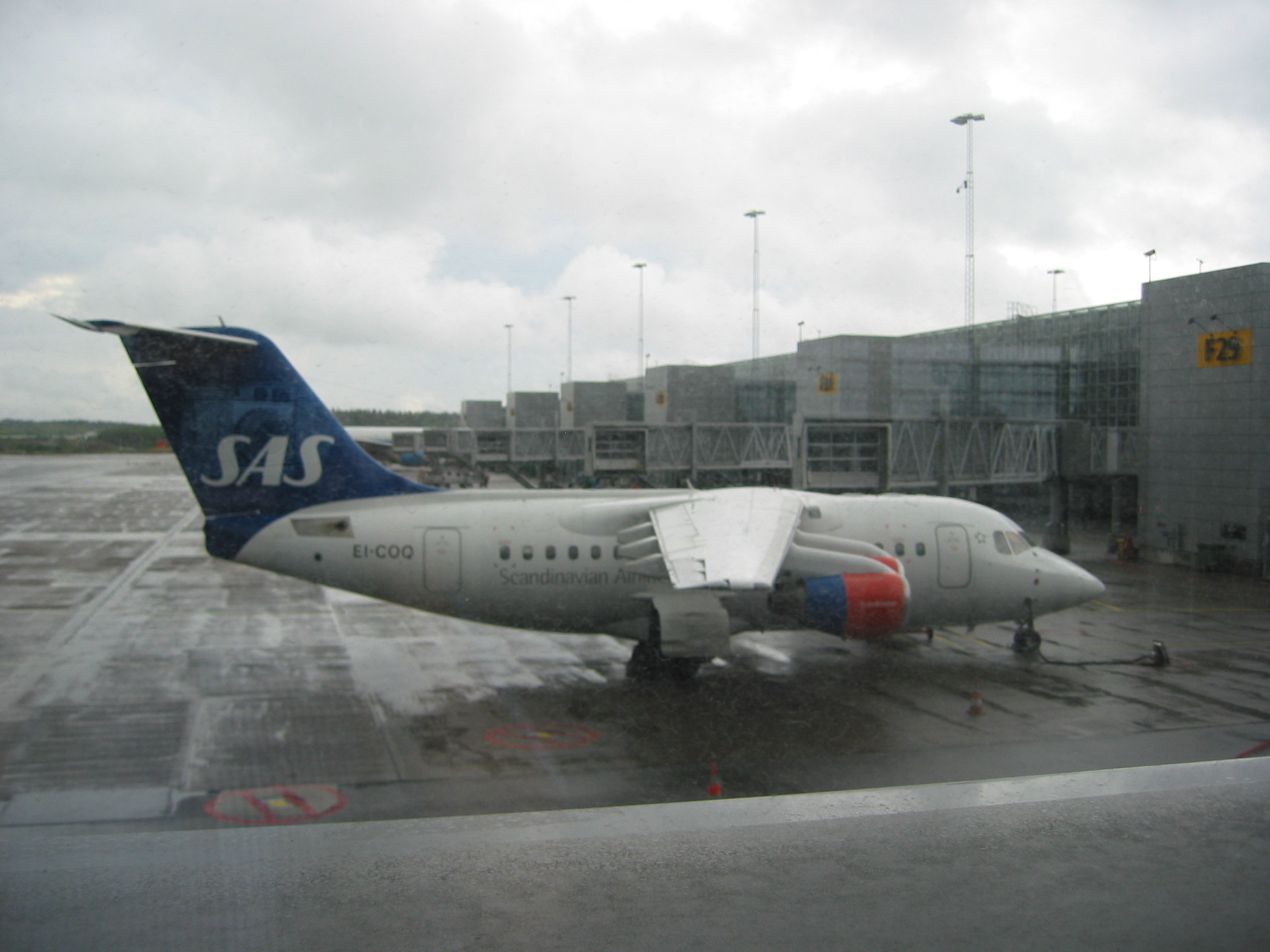
EI-COQ (later SE-DJP) when contracted by Scandinavian Airlines

On behalf of Alitalia

- Italy
  - Milan (Linate Airport)
- United Kingdom
  - London (London City Airport)

== Fleet ==
The Transwede Airways fleet consisted of the following aircraft (as of March 2008):

- 4 Avro RJ70 one aircraft was operated for Scandinavian Airlines Sweden, two aircraft are operated for SAS Norge and one aircraft is operated for Air One).
- 2 Avro RJ85 were operated for Scandinavian Airlines Sweden.
