= SKX =

SKX is a three-letter acronym that may stand for:

- Saransk Airport (IATA: SKX), an airport near Saransk, Russia
- Skyways (airline) (ICAO: SKX), a regional and domestic airline based in Linköping, Sweden
  - Avia Express (ICAO: SKX), a charter airline based in Stockholm, Sweden formerly associated with Skyways
- Taos Regional Airport (FAA LID: SKX), a public use airport near Taos, New Mexico, United States
- The NYSE stock symbol for American shoe company Skechers
- SKX, a three-letter acronym for designating a variant of Intel Skylake CPU microarchitecture that uses a different cache architecture (increased L2 cache size and reduced L3 cache size per core), adds support for some AVX-512 instructions, and uses a 2D-mesh network topology for inter-core communication
