= UMS/UHD/UHX =

Swedish forklift truck

UMS/UHD/UHX is a forklift truck in the Tergo series from the Swedish manufacturer Atlet AB. It differs from traditional forklift truck design philosophy in that it is entirely designed around the operator. By letting the forklift truck adjust to the operator's skills and body structure the UMS/UHD/UHX is an example of how ergonomics is an important part of machine efficiency.

== Sources ==
Atlet, Henrik Moberger, Tärnan Reportage AB 2008. ISBN 978-91-633-1924-2
