= Benareby =

- Location within Västra Götaland Location within Sweden
- Coordinates: 57°39′N 12°10′E
- Country: Sweden
- Province: Västergötland
- County: Västra Götaland County
- Municipality: Härryda Municipality

Area
  - Total: 0.66 km^{2} (0.25 sq mi)

Population (31 December 2010)
  - Total: 384
  - Density: 586/km^{2} (1,520/sq mi)
- Time zone: UTC+1 (CET)
  - Summer (DST): UTC+2 (CEST)

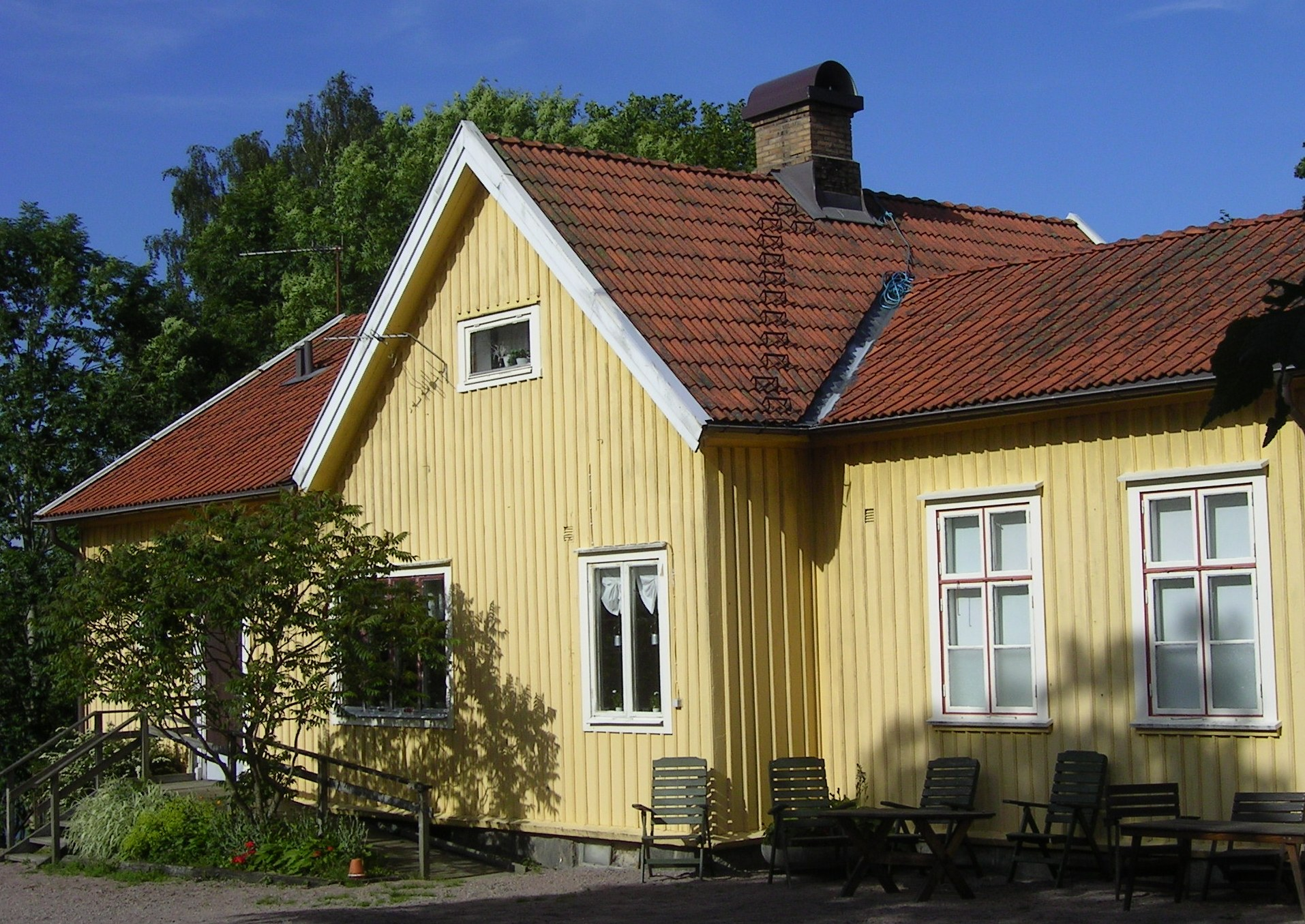
Former school in Benareby, Härryda

Benareby is a locality situated in Härryda Municipality, Västra Götaland County, Sweden. It had 384 inhabitants in 2010.
