= Eskilsby och Snugga =

- Location within Västra Götaland Location within Sweden
- Coordinates: 57°37′N 12°17′E
- Country: Sweden
- Province: Västergötland
- County: Västra Götaland County
- Municipality: Härryda Municipality

Area
  - Total: 0.67 km^{2} (0.26 sq mi)

Population (31 December 2010)
  - Total: 220
  - Density: 327/km^{2} (850/sq mi)
- Time zone: UTC+1 (CET)
  - Summer (DST): UTC+2 (CEST)

School of Eskilsby, Härryda municipality, Sweden

Eskilsby och Snugga is a locality situated in Härryda Municipality, Västra Götaland County, Sweden. It had 220 inhabitants in 2010.
