= Stora Bugärde =

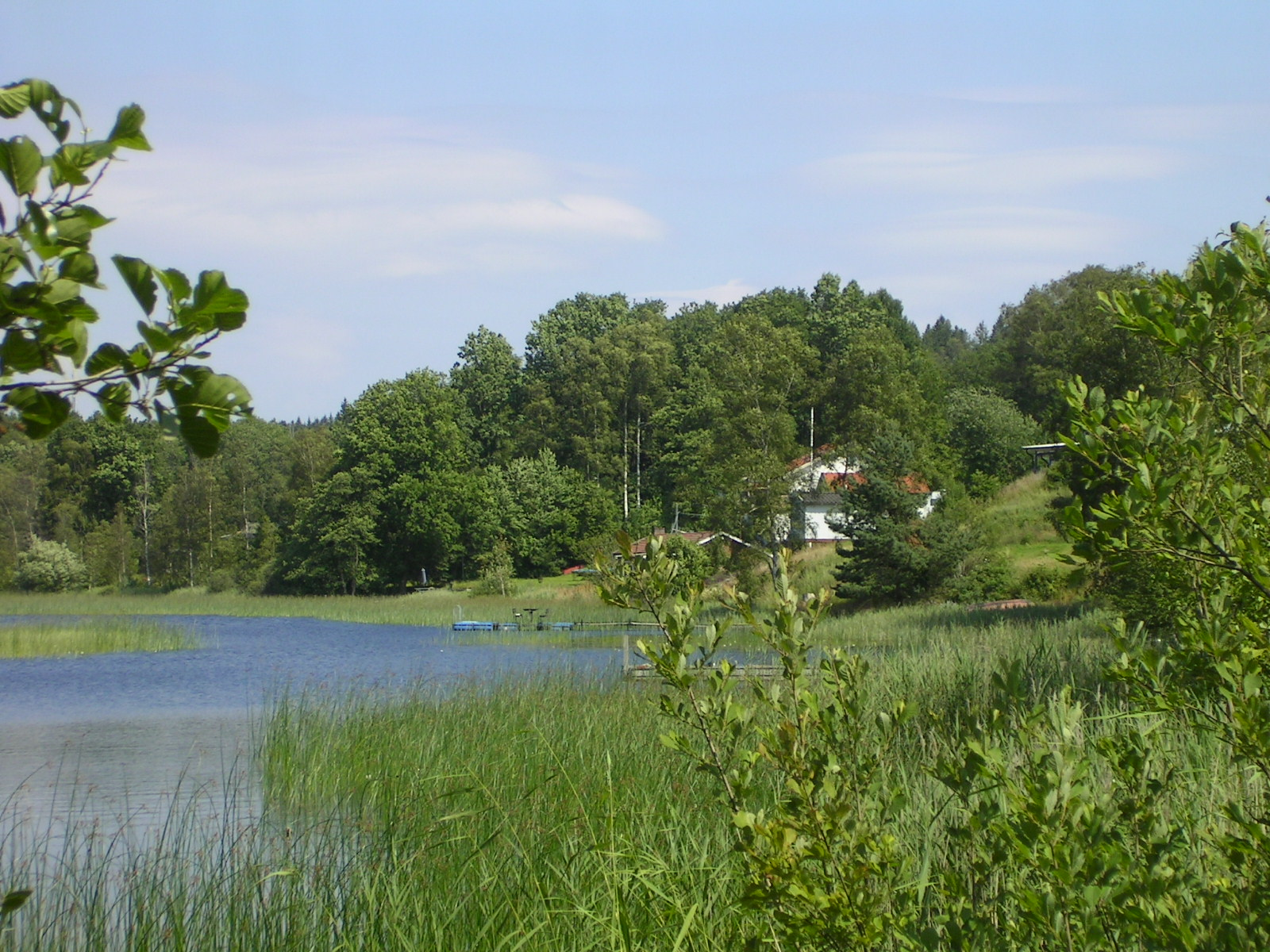

- Location within Västra Götaland Location within Sweden
- Coordinates: 57°39′20″N 12°23′46″E
- Country: Sweden
- Province: Västergötland
- County: Västra Götaland County
- Municipality: Härryda Municipality

Area
  - Total: 1.02 km^{2} (0.39 sq mi)

Population (31 December 2010)
  - Total: 367
  - Density: 360/km^{2} (930/sq mi)
- Time zone: UTC+1 (CET)
  - Summer (DST): UTC+2 (CEST)

Stora Bugärde is a locality situated in Härryda Municipality, Västra Götaland County, Sweden. It had 367 inhabitants in 2010.
