= Nya Långenäs =

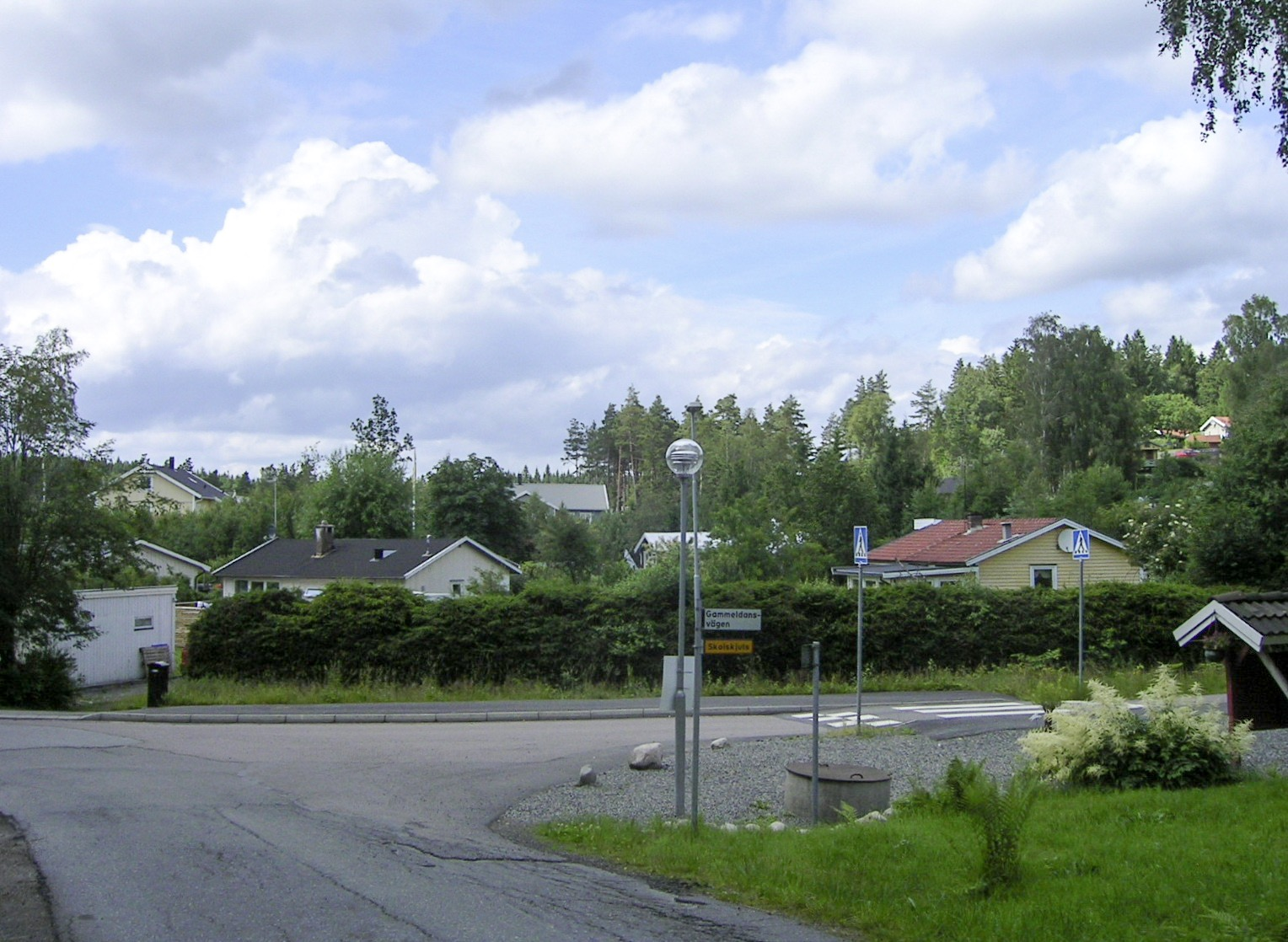
- Nya Långenäs village in Sweden

- Location within Västra Götaland Location within Sweden
- Coordinates: 57°39′N 12°10′E
- Country: Sweden
- Province: Västergötland
- County: Västra Götaland County
- Municipality: Härryda Municipality

Area
  - Total: 0.23 km^{2} (0.089 sq mi)

Population (31 December 2010)
  - Total: 268
  - Density: 1,150/km^{2} (3,000/sq mi)
- Time zone: UTC+1 (CET)
  - Summer (DST): UTC+2 (CEST)

Nya Långenäs is a locality situated in Härryda Municipality, Västra Götaland County, Sweden. It had 268 inhabitants in 2010.
