= Skyways (Swedish airline) =

1993–2012 airline in Sweden

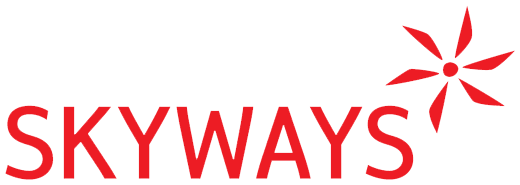
IATA	ICAO	Call sign
JZ	SKX	SKY EXPRESS
- Founded: 1993
- Ceased operations: 22 May 2012
- Hubs: Stockholm-Arlanda Airport, Göteborg Landvetter Airport
- Headquarters: Stockholm Arlanda Airport, Sweden
- Key people: CEO Mikael Wångdahl

Skyways Express AB was a Swedish airline that operated regional and domestic scheduled services. With its corporate head office on the property of Stockholm-Arlanda Airport in Sigtuna Municipality, Sweden, its main hub was at Stockholm-Arlanda Airport. The airline was placed into administration on 22 May 2012. Previously its head office was at Eurostop köpcenter, Cederströms slinga, Arlandastad.

== History ==
The airline was established in 1987 and was previously known as Avia. It acquired Salair on 15 July 1991, Highland Air in March 1997 and Air Express in 1999. A partnership was forged with Scandinavian Airlines (SAS) which acquired a 25% stake in April 1998. The owners were Salenia (72.7%), SAS (25%) and Janus (2.3%). The operational division of Skyways was separated from the sales division in 2009. During 2010 there was some restructuring regarding ownership. SAS sold its share of the company at a loss, and eventually it was acquired by the asset management company Manswell Enterprises Limited, controlled by Ihor Kolomoyskyi. In 2011 Skyways merged with another Manswell controlled company, the Gothenburg-based airline City Airline, as Skyways. It also bought the Danish airline Cimber Sterling and developed the intention to become Scandinavia's biggest regional airline. As of December 1, 2010 the operation, sales and marketing of the airline functioned again as one unit under Avia Express continuing the use of the brand Skyways.

On 22 May 2012, Skyways Express AB and City Airline AB filed for bankruptcy; Cimber Sterling had filed for bankruptcy earlier that month.

== Destinations ==
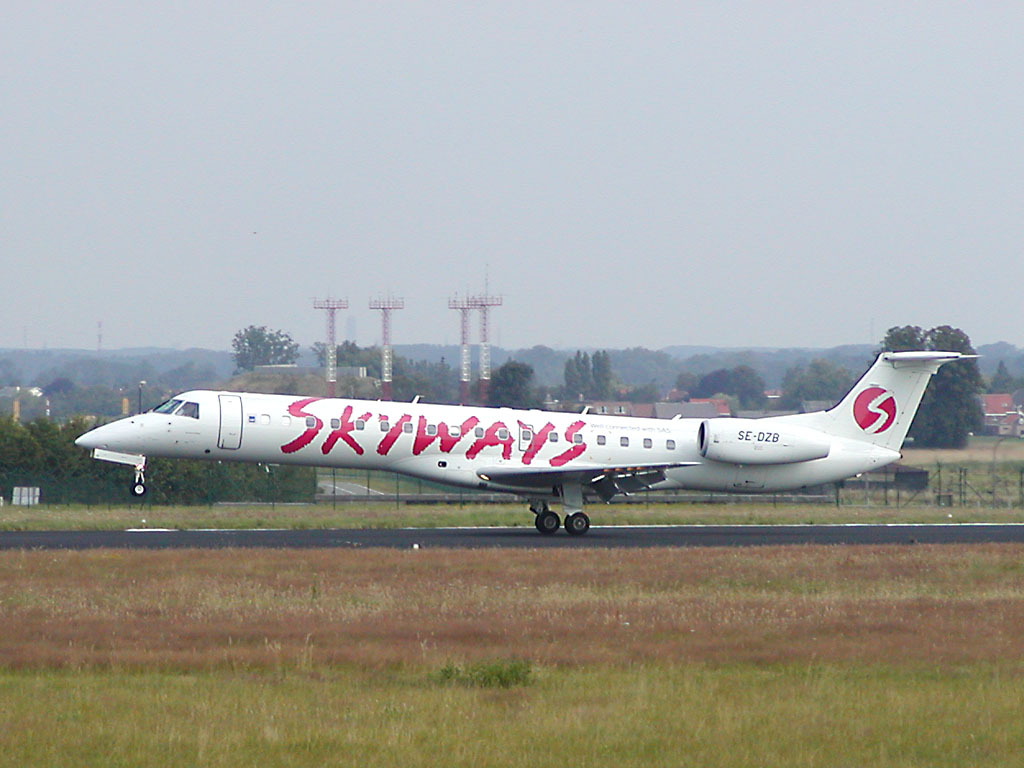
Skyways Express Embraer ERJ 145

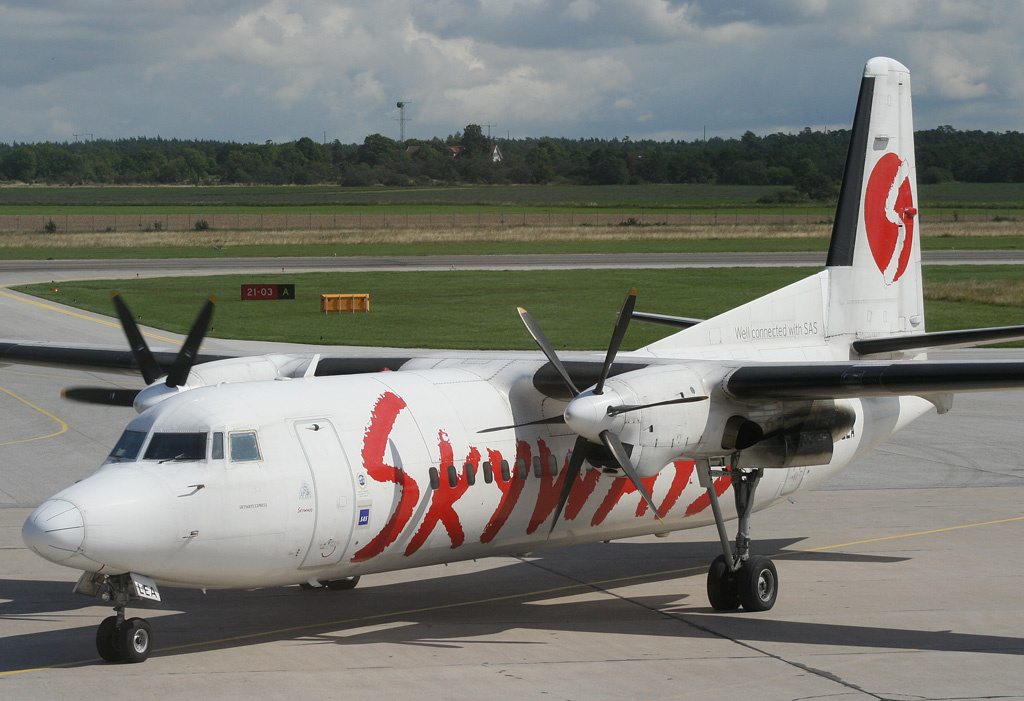
Fokker 50 at Visby Airport

In May 2012, Skyways operated to the following destinations:

Destinations
Country	Destination	Notes
Norway	Bergen	
United Kingdom	Birmingham	
Sweden	Visby	
Sweden	Göteborg	Hub
Sweden	Halmstad	
Finland	Helsinki	
Sweden	Jönköping	
Sweden	Karlstad	
Ukraine	Kyiv	
Sweden	Kristianstad	
Denmark	Copenhagen	
Denmark	Billund	
Sweden	Luleå	
France	Lyon	
United Kingdom	Manchester	
Sweden	Oskarshamn	
Czech Republic	Prague	
Latvia	Riga	
Norway	Røros	
Norway	Stavanger	
Sweden	Stockholm	Hubs Arlanda & Bromma
Sweden	Sundsvall	
Estonia	Tallinn	
Sweden	Umeå	
Sweden	Växjö	
Switzerland	Zürich	
Sweden	Åre Östersund	

== Partners ==
- Blue1
- Widerøe
- Air Baltic
- Estonian Air
- Finnair

== Fleet ==
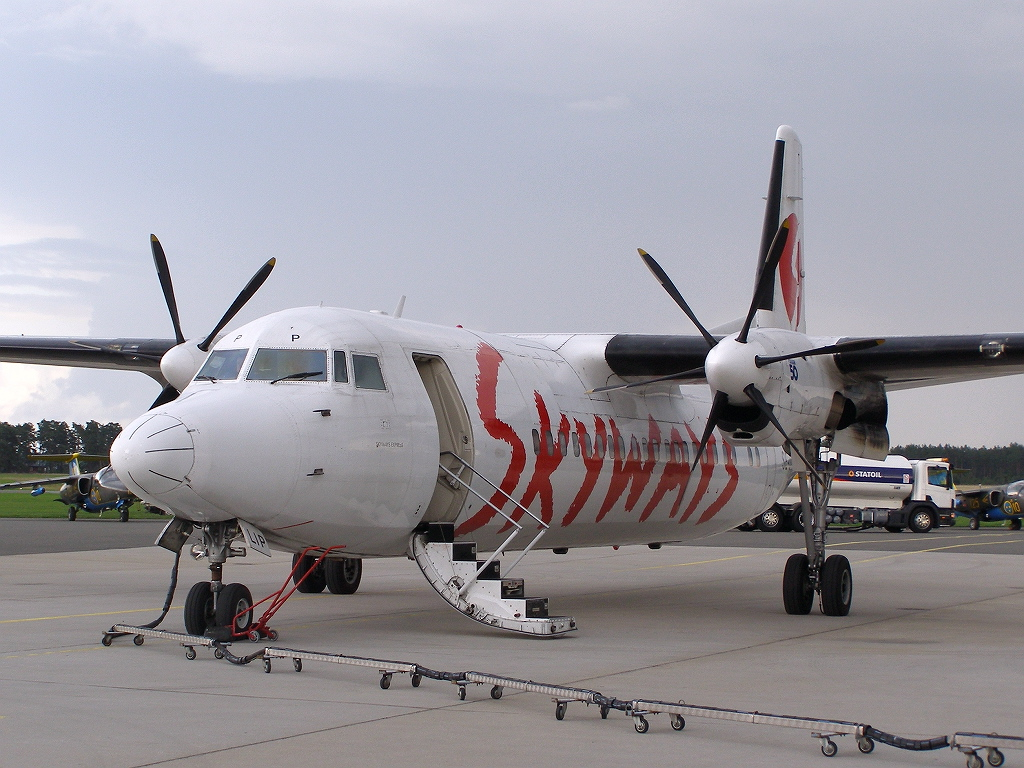
Skyways Express Fokker 50

In August 2010 the Skyways Express fleet included the following aircraft:

Skyways Fleet
Aircraft	In service	Passengers
Fokker 50	12	50
Embraer 145	11	48
Total	23	

== See also ==
- Airlines
- Transport in Sweden
