= Tergo =

Series of Swedish forklift trucks

Tergo is the name for a series of forklift trucks from the Swedish manufacturer Atlet AB. In the 80’s Atlet AB was pioneering in ergonomics and operator-centric development of trucks, following the idea that optimal operative efficiency is best created by first optimizing operator’s environment. The result of this philosophy was the Atlet Tergo® trucks that ever since have been manufactured in a variety of models and variants, e.g. Tergo Forte UMS/UHD/UHX.
