= Härryda =

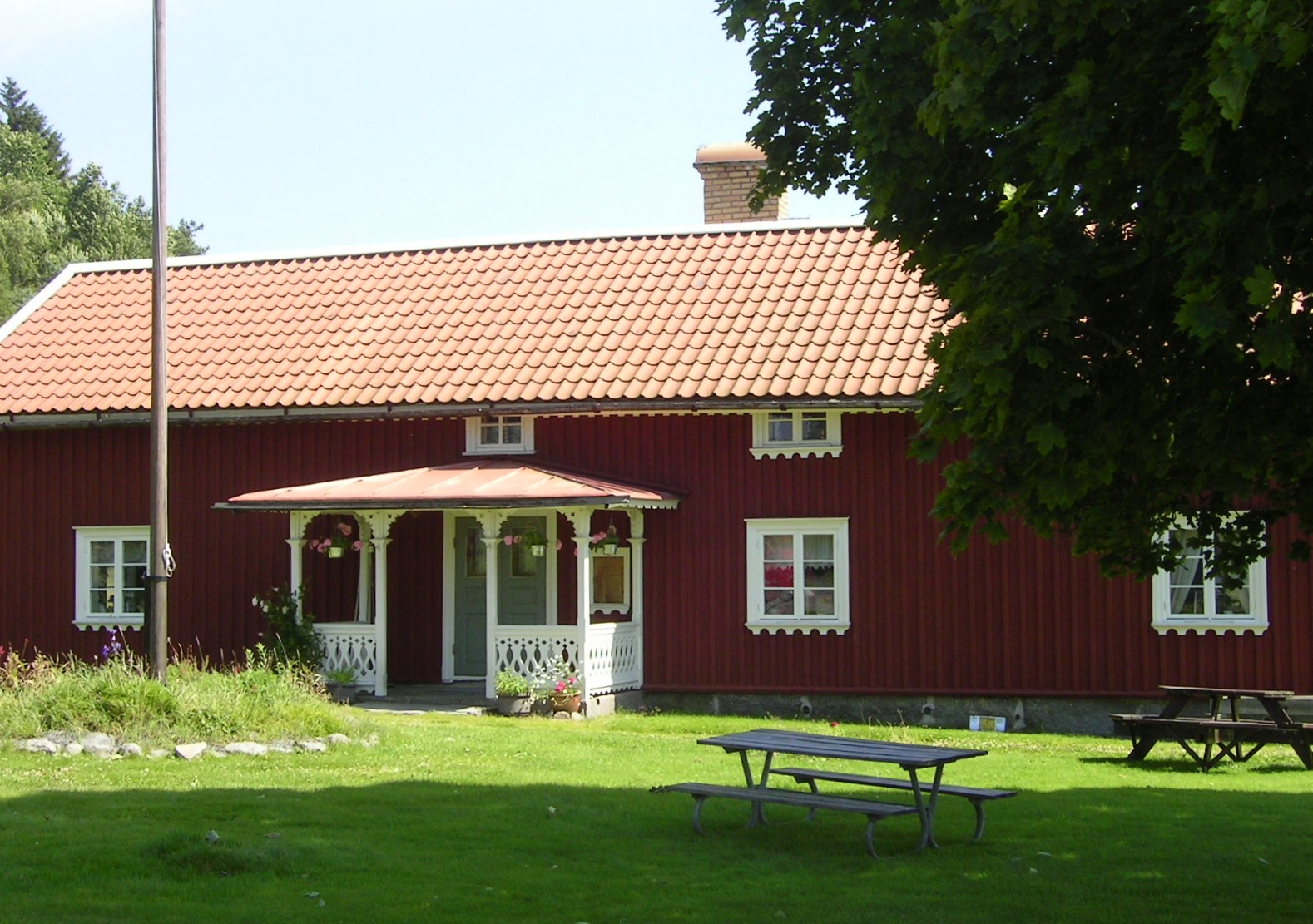

- Location within Västra Götaland Location within Sweden
- Coordinates: 57°41′N 12°18′E
- Country: Sweden
- Province: Västergötland
- County: Västra Götaland County
- Municipality: Härryda Municipality

Area
  - Total: 2.34 km^{2} (0.90 sq mi)

Population (31 December 2010)
  - Total: 968
  - Density: 414/km^{2} (1,070/sq mi)
- Time zone: UTC+1 (CET)
  - Summer (DST): UTC+2 (CEST)

Härryda (Swedish pronunciation: [ˈhæ̂ˌrːyːda]) is a locality situated in Härryda Municipality, Västra Götaland County, Sweden. It had 968 inhabitants in 2010. Despite its name it is not the seat of the municipality, which is the much larger Mölnlycke. Härryda is the closest locality from the Göteborg Landvetter Airport, three kilometers (2 miles) from the terminal building. It is located right under the flight path, so there is a high noise level. Many residents work at the airport and are therefore more forgiving against airplane noise.
