= Atlet AB =

- Founded: 1958
- Founder: Knut Jacobsson
- Headquarters: Mölnlycke, Sweden
- Area served: 47 countries
- Operating income: SEK 1.8 billion
- Number of employees: around 1000
- Website: atlet.com

Atlet was a Swedish company that manufactured indoor and outdoor trucks. The company also provided services related to trucks and material handling, such as logistics analysis, training and service. The head office, manufacturing and training premises were located in Mölnlycke, just outside Göteborg, Sweden.

Nissan Forklift Co. Ltd. bought Atlet in 2007 and merged with Mitsubishi and changed the name to Unicarriers. Mitsubishi later bought out Unicarriers and changed the name to Mitsubishi.

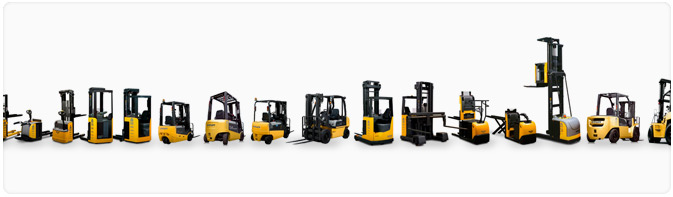

== History ==
Knut Jacobsson started Elitmaskiner in Gothenburg in 1958. At the time the company only made trucks for indoor use. Elitmaskiner changed its name to Atlet in 1966.

The company started by making hand pallet trucks. Around 1960, powered stackers and telereach trucks dominated the market. Knut Jacobsson then invented the pedestrian stacker that had a lifting capacity comparable with the telereach trucks, but could be used in narrower aisles, thanks to its patented side stabilizers.

Atlet started providing training for truck operators in the 70s. Technical developments continued with computerized simulations of warehouse management solutions, automatic trucks and mobile terminal systems, and between 1988 and 1994 Atlet took part in a development project in collaboration with doctors and occupational therapists. This resulted in Tergo, a telereach truck with ergonomic solutions such as the mini steering wheel and floating armrest.

Jacobsson left the CEO position in 1995, letting his daughter, Marianne Nilson, take over. It was then Sweden's biggest family-owned engineering company and one of the leading European truck manufacturers.

Nissan Forklift, a subsidiary of the Nissan Motor Company, bought Atlet AB in 2007. Nissan Motor Company spun-off its Industrial Machinery Division and establish a new company, “Nissan Forklift Co., Ltd.”, effective from October 1, 2010.

== See also ==
- A Ergo
