= City Airline =

Regional airline of Sweden (1997–2011)

IATA	ICAO	Call sign
CF	SDR	SWEDESTAR
- Founded: 1997
- Ceased operations: 29 November 2011 (merged into Skyways)
- Hubs: Göteborg Landvetter Airport
- Frequent-flyer program: EuroBonus
- Parent company: Janus AB
- Website: www.cityairline.com

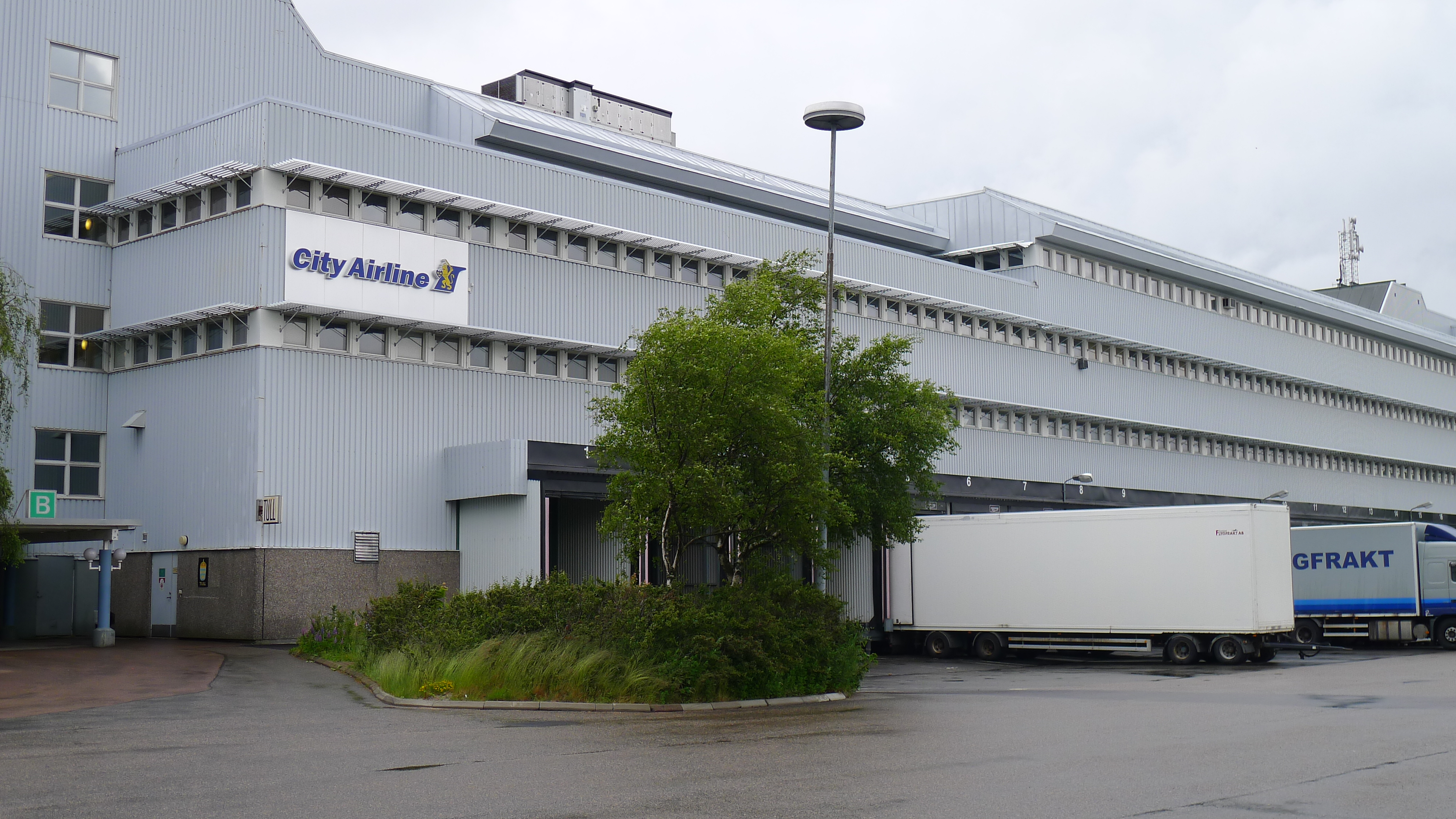
City Airline head office

City Airline AB was a regional airline based in the Air Cargo Building on the grounds of Göteborg Landvetter Airport in Landvetter, Härryda Municipality, Sweden. It was privately owned and operated a medium-sized European network from its main base at Landvetter. The airline was wholly owned by Investment AB Janus of Gothenburg and employed 110 staff (as of July 2007). On 29 November 2011 the City Airline name was dropped after being acquired by Skyways, and all flights were then operated under the Skyways brand. In May 2012 Skyways and City Airline filed for bankruptcy.

When City Airline filed for bankruptcy it was the only airline with a hub in Göteborg Landvetter Airport.

== History ==
City Airline was established in 1997, originally operating wet leases for British Midland Airways. On 10 September 2001, it started its own regional services from Gothenburg, much of which correspond to the needs of large companies based in Gothenburg, most notably Volvo Cars with its links to Birmingham (Jaguar Cars), Volvo Trucks with links to Lyon (Renault Trucks) and AstraZeneca with links to Manchester Airport. It has from around 2008 expanded in the leisure market with destinations such as Barcelona, Nice and Mallorca.

City Airline has signed a codeshare agreement with Scandinavian Airlines from March 2006, which also made the SAS frequent flyer-program available on City Airline flights.

On 29 April 2011, City Airline announced that Swedish regional airline Skyways Express acquired the company and City Airline name will be dropped and all flights would operated under the Skyways brand.

On 22 May 2012, Skyways announced immediate cancellation of all flights due to lack of finances. Both City Airline AB and Skyways Express AB filed for bankruptcy.

== See also ==
- Airlines
- Transport in Sweden
