= A Ergo =

Forklift

The A Ergo is a stand-in stacker forklift truck pioneered by the Swedish truck manufacturing company Atlet AB. When Atlet was founded in 1958, the truck market consisted of many types of trucks including the reach trucks. In 1961, to improve handling efficiency and safety, Atlet AB launched the stand-in stacker as the “impossible truck” the A Ergo, an alternative to the pedestrian stackers and reach trucks already in the market.

It handles open load carriers with standard straddle legs, and closed load carriers in between wide straddle legs. High drive speed and lift/lowering speed add to a high throughput and productivity – as does the ergonomic design. And for even higher residual capacity it offers foldable side stabilizers. Atlet's smart modular concept makes it possible to customize each truck for your specific needs. For multi-shift applications, the battery is placed on rollers, for quick, easy changes.

Other features:

- Atlet Modular Concept design for highest First Visit Fix Rate.
- AC motor for reduced maintenance plus maximum acceleration and drive speed.
- Atlet Stability Support System S3.
