= Avia Express =

Swedish charter airline

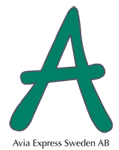
IATA	ICAO	Call sign
JZ	SKX	SKY EXPRESS
- Founded: 1940
- Ceased operations: 2011
- Hubs: Stockholm-Arlanda Airport
- Fleet size: 12
- Parent company: Salénia
- Headquarters: Jönköping, Sweden
- Website: http://www.aviaexpress.se/

Avia Express was a charter airline based in Stockholm, Sweden. Its main base was Stockholm-Arlanda Airport.

== History ==
The airline was founded in 1940 by Mr. and Mrs. Thuring in Fårösund, Sweden. It did primary work for the Swedish Airforce. In 1945 Avia started with agricultural flights and training of pilots. In 1984, Gotlandsbolaget buys Avia, which it owned until one year after the merger with AMA-Flyg/Salair in 1992. In 1993 Salénia became the sole owner of Avia, which they re-branded into Skyways Express. At the same time Scandinavian Airlines shuts down Swedair and decides to buy a stake in Skyways instead. In 2009 Skyways sales unit and operational division was separated and the operational division was renamed Avia again. The company closed down 2011.

== Fleet ==
The Avia Express had the following aircraft (as of 23 August 2010):

Avia Express Fleet
Aircraft	Total	Orders	Passengers (Economy)	Notes
Fokker 50	12	0	—	ten aircraft are operated for Skyways Express and two aircraft are leased to Air Baltic
Total	12	0		

== See also ==
- Airlines
- Transport in Sweden
