= Mölnlycke =

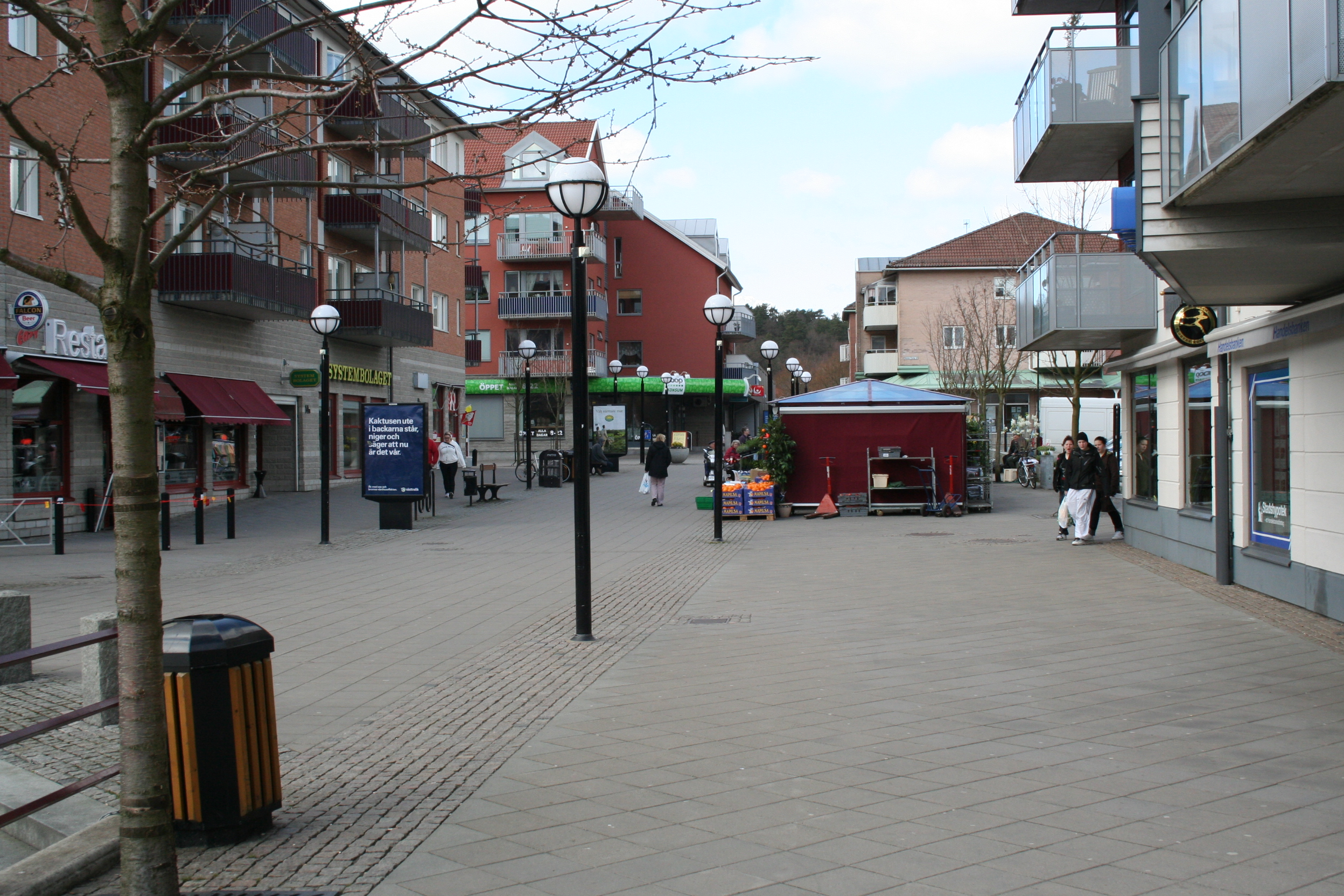
- Central Mölnlycke

- Location within Västra Götaland Location within Sweden
- Coordinates: 57°40′N 12°07′E
- Country: Sweden
- Province: Västergötland
- County: Västra Götaland County
- Municipality: Härryda Municipality and Mölndal Municipality

Area
  - Total: 8.10 km^{2} (3.13 sq mi)

Population (31 December 2020)
  - Total: 18,392
  - Density: 2,270/km^{2} (5,880/sq mi)
- Time zone: UTC+1 (CET)
  - Summer (DST): UTC+2 (CEST)

Mölnlycke is a small town nearby Greater Gothenburg, a locality and the seat of Härryda Municipality, Västra Götaland County, Sweden. It had 17,499 inhabitants in 2019. The urban area stretches over two municipalities. Mölndal Municipality is the second.

Municipality	Population	Other urban areas	Other	Total	% of municipality population
Härryda	13,585	12,262	4,429	30,276	44.87
Mölndal	90	53,389	2,658	56,137	0.16
Total	13,675	65,651	7,087	86,413	15.83

== History ==
The first people to settle in the area that would later become Mölnlycke came there during the Stone Age. At this time there were five lakes, which today are formed into one single lake. The lake shore is one of the places where many ancient remains have been found. It is speculated that when people learned to farm, this population moved out of the region to an area better for farming. The next known human settlement was during the Middle Ages, and this is also when the first Råda Church was built. During the Middle Ages, the border with Denmark went through what is today Mölnlycke and therefore the area was much affected by war between Denmark and Sweden.

The first time the name Mölnlycke was mentioned that we know of was 1576. The name was originally made up of the two Old Swedish words “mölna” and “lycka”, literally meaning mill field. It probably came from a mill built at the location of today's Mölnlycke Fabriker during the Middle Ages.

In 1849, Gustaf Ferdinand Hennig founded Mölnlycke Väfveri AB, a textile manufacturer, which has had a big impact on Mölnlycke. In addition to attracting many workers to the city, it also led to the building of the railway between Gothenburg and Borås, which today still has a stop in Mölnlycke. Today the company is called Mölnlycke Health Care.

== Geography ==
Mölnlycke is located at a height of 91 meters above sea level and is about 10 km from Gothenburg, the second largest city in Sweden. The short distance to Gothenburg is probably one of the factors of the quick expansion of the city that started during the 20th century, when many people started commuting between Mölnlycke and Gothenburg.

== Culture ==
Mölnlycke Kulturhus, located in the center of Mölnlycke, contains Mölnlycke library, a cinema and a café.

View of Mölnlycke

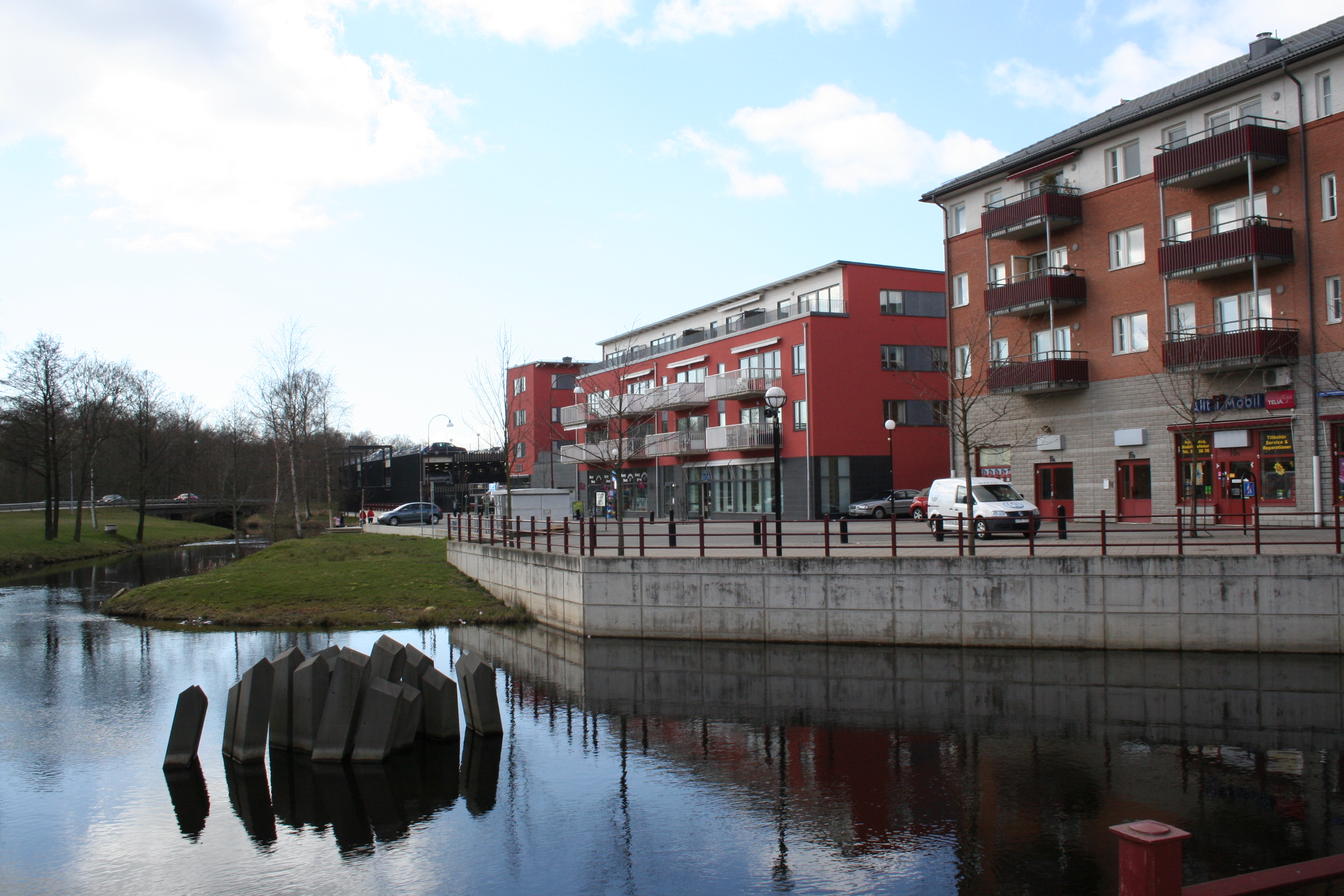
View of Mölnlycke
