= Landvetter =

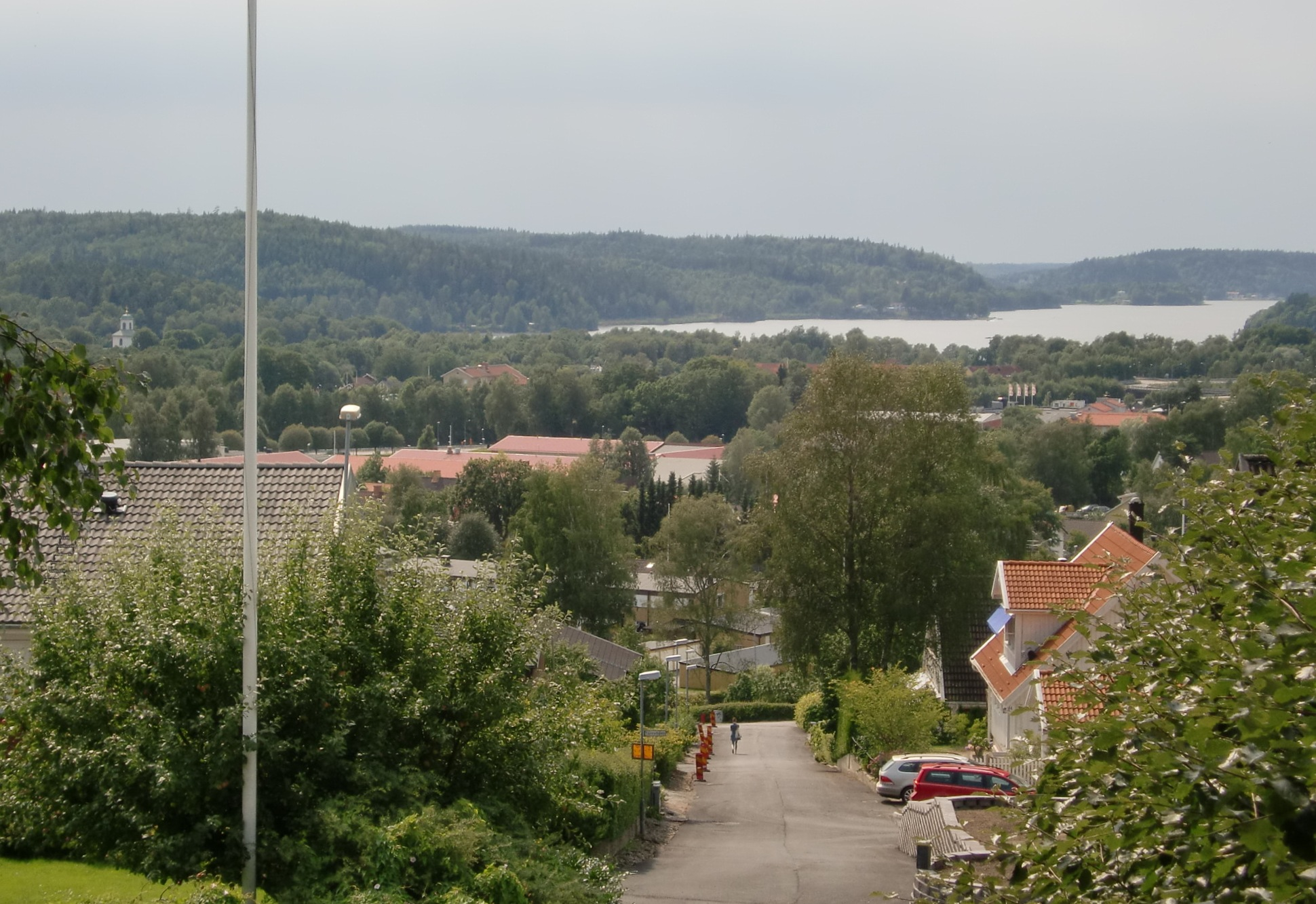
- Landvetter

- Location within Västra Götaland Location within Sweden
- Coordinates: 57°41′N 12°12′E
- Country: Sweden
- Province: Västergötland
- County: Västra Götaland County
- Municipality: Härryda Municipality

Area
  - Total: 5.40 km^{2} (2.08 sq mi)

Population (31 December 2010)
  - Total: 7,152
  - Density: 1,324/km^{2} (3,430/sq mi)
- Time zone: UTC+1 (CET)
  - Summer (DST): UTC+2 (CEST)

Landvetter is a locality situated in Härryda Municipality, Västra Götaland County, Sweden. It had 7,152 inhabitants in 2010.

It is the second largest town in the municipality and has given its name to the international airport Göteborg Landvetter Airport, located 5 km east of Landvetter.

The name Landvetter is a combination of "land" (land) and "vittir", an old Swedish name for a certain type of fire.

City Airline had its head office in the Air Cargo Building on the grounds of Göteborg Landvetter Airport in Landvetter. When Transwede Airways existed, its head office was on the airport property.

== History ==
On 27 May 1645, during the Torstenson War, Swedish forces under Harald Stake defeated a Danish force led by Iver Kagge here on 27 May 1645.

== Sports ==
Landvetter IS and at least a dozen other sports clubs are located in Landvetter.

== Works cited ==
- Munthe, Carl Oscar (1901). Hannibalsfejden 1644–1645: Den norske hærs bloddåb [Hannibal's feud 1644–1645: The Norwegian army's blood baptism] (in Danish). Oslo: Grøndahl & Søns bogtrykkeri.
