= Härryda Municipality =

Härryda Municipality Härryda kommun
- Municipality
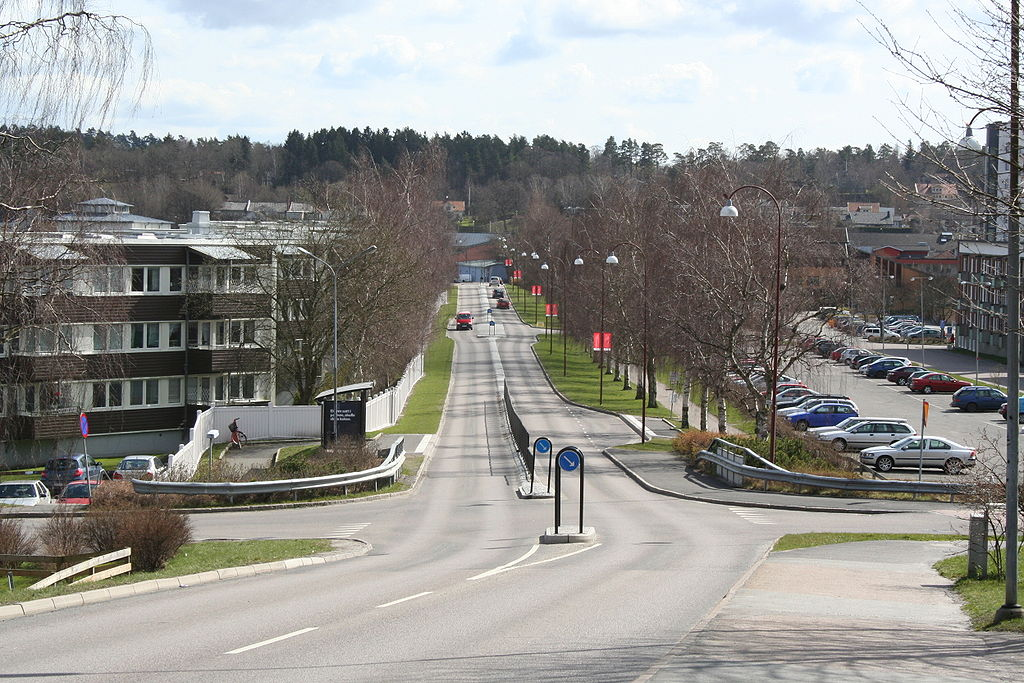

- Coat of arms

- Coordinates: 57°40′N 12°07′E
- Country: Sweden
- County: Västra Götaland County
- Seat: Mölnlycke

Area
  - Total: 291.09 km^{2} (112.39 sq mi)
  - Land: 266.78 km^{2} (103.00 sq mi)
  - Water: 24.31 km^{2} (9.39 sq mi)
- Area as of 1 January 2014.

Population (30 June 2025)
  - Total: 40,012
  - Density: 149.98/km^{2} (388.45/sq mi)
- Time zone: UTC+1 (CET)
  - Summer (DST): UTC+2 (CEST)
- ISO 3166 code: SE
- Province: Västergötland
- Municipal code: 1401
- Website: www.harryda.se

Härryda Municipality (Swedish: Härryda kommun) is a municipality in Västra Götaland County in western Sweden. Its seat is located in the town of Mölnlycke, which has about 19,000 inhabitants.

Göteborg Landvetter Airport, Sweden's second-largest airport, is situated near the locality of Härryda, after which the municipality is named. The airport is named after Landvetter, the second-biggest town in the municipality. City Airline has its head office in the Air Cargo Building on the grounds of the airport. When Transwede Airways existed, its head office stood on the airport property.

Proceeding clockwise along the edge of Härryda Municipality, one encounters the borders of the municipalities of Lerum, Bollebygd, Mark, Mölndal, Gothenburg and Partille.

The present municipality was created in 1971 by the amalgamation of the former municipalities of Björketorp, Landvetter and Råda.

Until 19 November 2007 the municipality was the only one in Sweden lacking a coat of arms, using only a logotype.

== Localities ==
- Hindås
- Härryda
- Hällingsjö
- Landvetter
- Mölnlycke (seat)
- Rävlanda

== Demographics ==
This is a demographic table based on Härryda Municipality's electoral districts in the 2022 Swedish general election sourced from SVT's election platform, in turn taken from SCB official statistics.

In total there were 38,960 residents, including 28,334 Swedish citizens of voting age. 44.6% voted for the left coalition and 54.4% for the right coalition. Indicators are in percentage points except population totals and income.

Location	Residents	Citizen adults	Left vote	Right vote	Employed	Swedish parents	Foreign heritage	Income SEK	Degree
Location			%	%					
Backa-Eskilsby	2,205	1,628	40.5	58.0	87	84	16	31,238	44
Båtsmanstorpet	1,971	1,419	46.8	52.2	87	86	14	35,279	66
Djupedalsäng	1,680	1,257	47.5	51.4	87	87	13	34,163	67
Hindås C-Ingelse	1,798	1,312	41.8	56.9	83	86	14	28,674	45
Hällingsjö	1,645	1,225	44.9	53.1	88	85	15	29,920	42
Härryda	1,815	1,354	37.6	61.1	84	81	19	27,433	32
Högadal-Övre Skogen	2,032	1,664	47.0	52.2	85	81	19	33,931	66
Kindbogården-Solsten	1,937	1,514	48.2	51.1	81	85	15	31,066	63
Landvetter C-V	2,132	1,609	46.1	53.1	84	80	20	29,762	43
Landvetter C-Ö	2,008	1,398	42.2	56.9	89	88	12	34,325	56
Mölnlycke C	1,680	1,360	50.0	48.9	81	82	18	26,682	58
Nedre Skogen-Skinnefjäll	1,874	1,444	49.3	49.8	82	77	23	29,581	51
Nysäter-Benareby	1,784	1,212	38.5	61.1	89	85	15	35,652	56
Orrekullen-Långetjärnsh.	1,640	1,064	40.4	58.6	89	89	11	41,566	73
Pixbo	2,082	1,489	48.3	51.2	90	89	11	38,492	76
Rävlanda	2,035	1,461	44.1	54.7	85	84	16	27,901	40
Säteriet-Bråta	2,276	1,518	57.2	40.7	73	57	43	24,000	37
Tahult-Byvägen	2,308	1,664	36.5	62.3	88	85	15	32,360	48
Älmhult-Bocköhalvön	1,770	1,218	41.2	56.8	87	85	15	31,219	49
Önneröd-Salmered	2,288	1,524	44.7	55.1	91	91	9	36,771	65
Source: SVT
