= Göteborg Landvetter Airport =

Airport serving Gothenburg, Sweden

Göteborg Landvetter Airport Göteborg/Landvetters flygplats

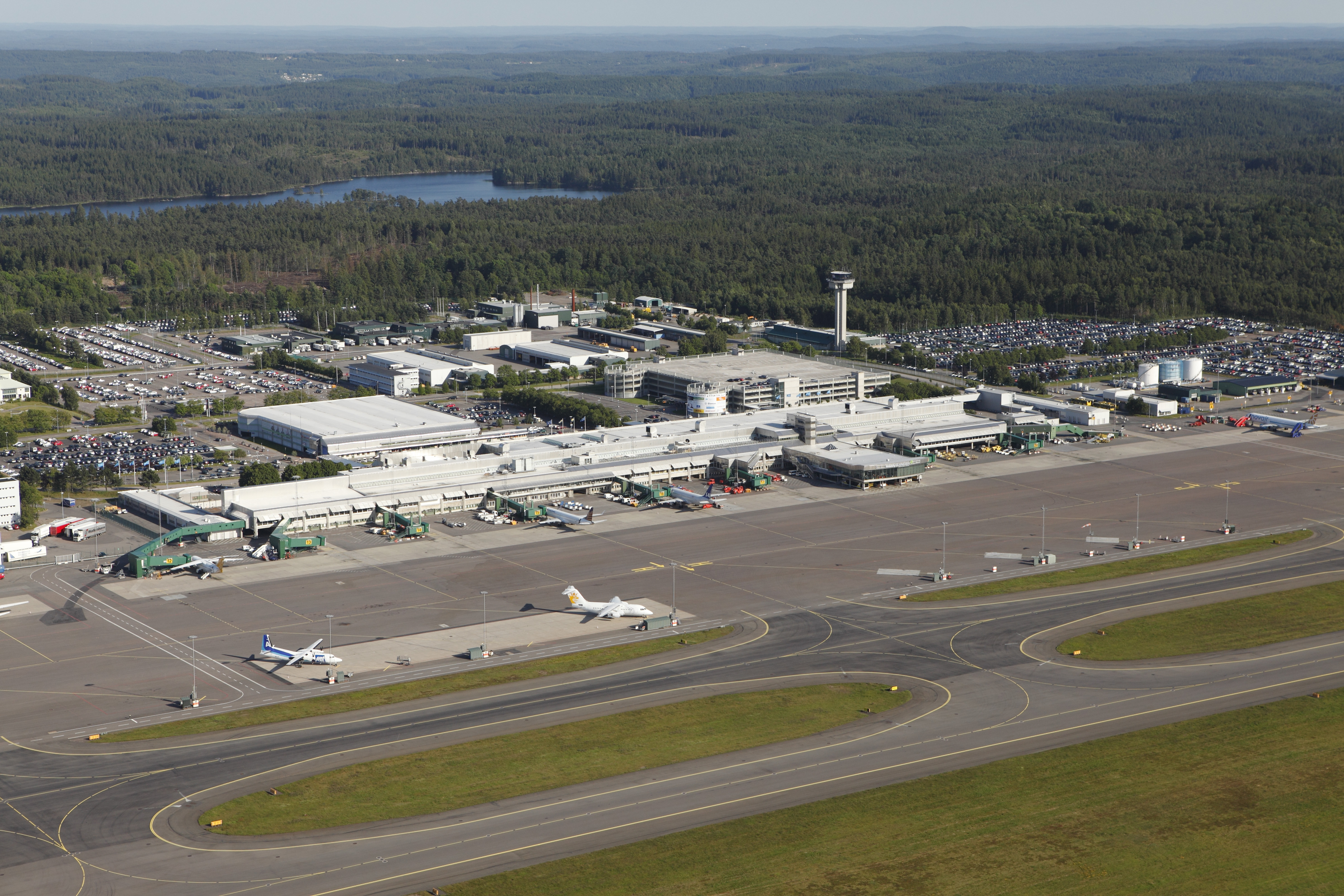
- IATA: GOT; ICAO: ESGG

Summary
- Airport type: Public
- Owner/Operator: Swedavia
- Serves: Gothenburg
- Location: Härryda Municipality, Västra Götaland County, Sweden
- Opened: 3 October 1977; 49 years ago
- Focus city for: Scandinavian Airlines
- Operating base for: Ryanair; Sunclass Airlines; TUI fly Nordic
- Elevation AMSL: 154 m (505 ft)
- Coordinates: 57°39′36″N 012°17′28″E
- Website: www.swedavia.com/landvetter

Map
- Location of airport in Sweden

Runways
| Direction | Length | | Surface |
| Direction | m | ft | Surface |
|---|---|---|---|
| 03/21 | 3,300 | 10,826 | Asphalt |

Statistics (2024)
- Passengers total: 5,336,985 (▲3%)
- International passengers: 4,811,179 (▲6%)
- Domestic passengers: 525,806 (▼20%)
- Landings total: 26,084
- Source: Swedish AIP at EUROCONTROL; Statistics: Swedavia

Göteborg Landvetter Airport (IATA: GOT, ICAO: ESGG), also known as Gothenburg Landvetter Airport, is an international airport serving the Gothenburg (Swedish: Göteborg) region in Sweden. With just over 5.3 million passengers in 2024, it is Sweden's second-largest airport after Stockholm Arlanda. Landvetter is also an important freight airport. During 2007, 60.1 thousand tonnes of air cargo passed through Landvetter, about 60% of the capacity of Arlanda.

The airport is named after Landvetter locality, which is in Härryda municipality. It is 11 NM (20 km; 13 mi) east-southeast of Gothenburg and 40 km (25 mi) west of Borås. It is operated by Swedavia, the national airport company. Since the closure of Göteborg City Airport for commercial operations, it's the city's only commercial passenger airport.

== History ==
=== Foundation and early years ===
The airport was opened by King Carl XVI Gustaf on 3 October 1977. Before Landvetter airport opened, Torslanda Airport, west of Gothenburg, was the main airport serving the city which it replaced after the current airport opened. In 2001, some budget airlines began serving the former military base in Säve, which was renamed from Säve Flygplats to Gothenburg City Airport. That airport was closed down in winter 2014–2015 because of large reconstruction needs, meaning an increase of traffic on Landvetter of almost a million annual passengers. There has been a tendency that international air travel has increased, especially on tourists, while domestic has declined somewhat (mostly business travel).

On 14 April 2015, Swedavia announced a 10-year long contract with DHL Express to build a new 7500 m^{2} large cargo terminal, replacing the old 1700 m^{2}. The construction will begin in spring 2015 and is underway for one year. This was a step included in plans for Airport City. In 2018-2020 the terminal building will be enlarged, with three new air bridges. There are also plans to build a shortcut on the railway Gothenburg–Borås with a tunnel and a railway station under the airport. Construction start has previously been decided to 2016, later 2020, but is as of 2021 delayed.

There has been criticism on the choice of location of the airport, which is fairly foggy, located 150 meters above sea level and often affected by low clouds. The runway direction also often means fairly strong crosswinds which can cause landings to scare passengers. In 2015, an instrument landing system CATIIIb was installed which allows landing in fairly dense fog if corresponding system is fitted onboard aircraft. Many but not all aircraft have that (as of 2018).

=== Development since 2020 ===
During the COVID-19 pandemic, most flights were cancelled. During April 2020, only the KLM route to Amsterdam was consistently operated daily. The passenger figures were 99.5% lower in April 2020 than in April 2019.

On 28 April 2023, Landvetter Airport achieved a major milestone when Scandinavian Airlines began its nonstop route to New York-EWR, connecting both cities three times weekly on board the 157 seater A321neo LR aircraft. Gothenburg previously was linked to New York more than 40 years ago in 1984 and since then lacked proper long haul services, apart from a few charter flights as e.g. to Thailand in winter.

A new terminal section, extending the terminal by 200 metres, was inaugurated in 2023.

== Terminal ==
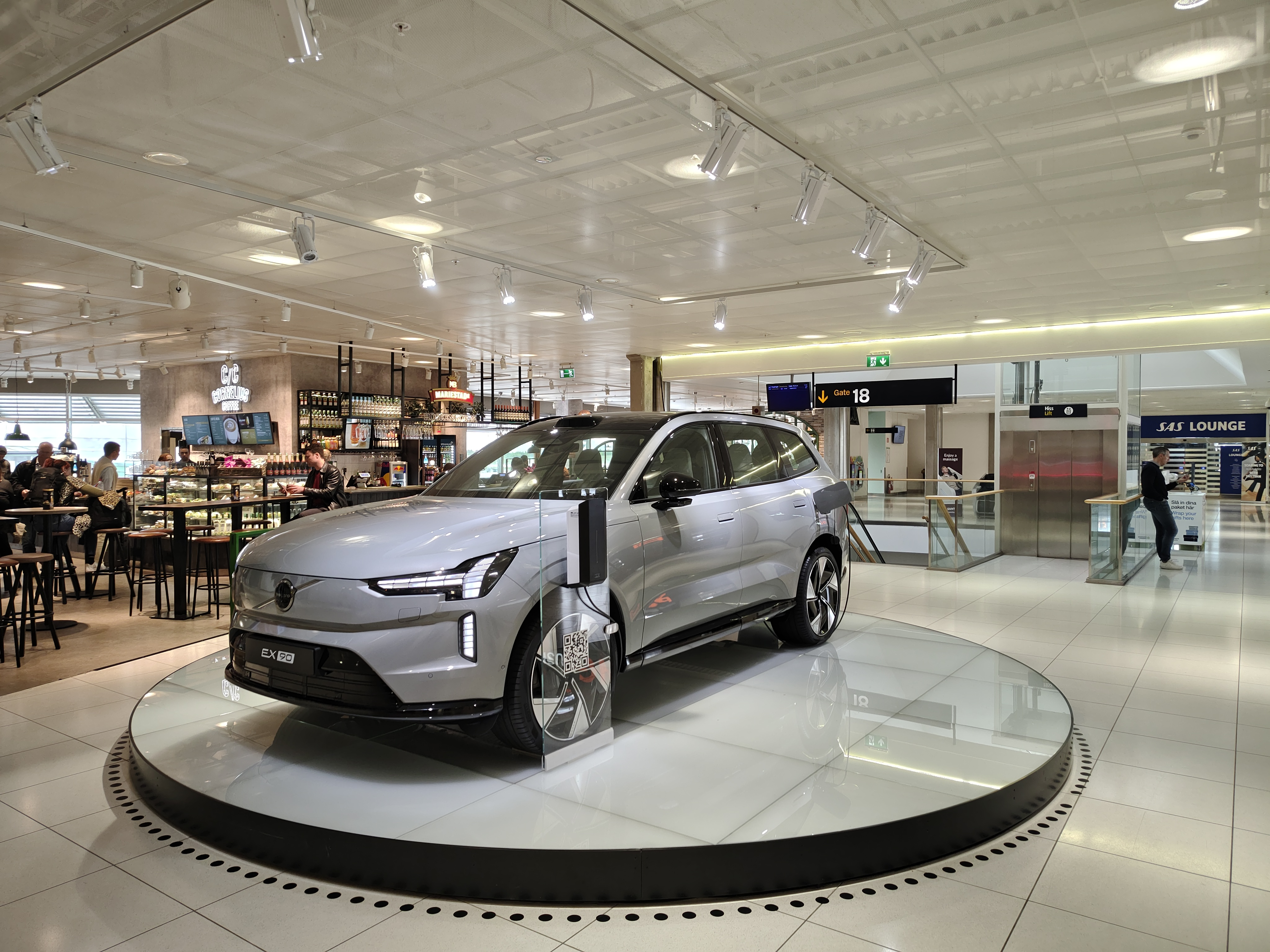
Volvo EX90 on display at Landvetter Airport

Landvetter Airport traditionally had two terminals, domestic and international, but they have merged into one common terminal. In 2009, all baggage drop was moved to in the international terminal, since all baggage had to be screened with new regulations. In 2014, the two terminals joined into one with all baggage collected at the arrivals hall in the previous international terminal. The transfer area, which has several shops, cafés and a restaurant, is accessible for all passengers since that year. There are eleven air bridges, at gates 12–17 and 19-23. Gates 10–11, 18A–H and 24A–E transport passengers to the aircraft via an airside bus transfer. Traditionally gates 10–15 used to be limited to domestic flights but nowadays 10–19 cater to all flights within the Schengen Area, which are treated as domestic flights. Gates 22–24 are located in the international transit area, used for flights outside the Schengen Area, and access is only possible after clearing immigration. Gate 20 and 21 are positionable so that, depending on upcoming flights, reaching them may (signed 20B-21B) or may not (signed 20A-21A) require clearing immigration. The freight terminal uses gate numbers below 10.

A new terminal section at the airport added 18,500 square metres and extended the terminal by 200 metres. The expansion, which began in 2017, includes three new regular gates, four bus gates, and additional seating for passengers. The expansion opened in stages with the first bus gates becoming operational in 2020, and was officially inaugurated in 2023. Non-Schengen passengers are now processed within the main terminal. The new bus gates feature weather protection.

The airport has a VIP area, where travellers for a fee can go through a dedicated security check, wait in the VIP lounge and be transported by car to the aircraft, avoiding mix with non VIP paying passengers. The VIP area can also hold wedding ceremonies.

== Airlines and destinations ==
=== Passenger ===
The following airlines operate regular scheduled and charter flights to and from Göteborg:

| Airlines | Destinations |
|---|---|
| Aegean Airlines | Seasonal: Chania, Rhodes |
| airBaltic | Riga |
| Air France | Paris–Charles de Gaulle |
| Air Serbia | Seasonal: Belgrade |
| Austrian Airlines | Seasonal: Vienna |
| British Airways | London–Heathrow |
| BrommaFLyg | Visby |
| Brussels Airlines | Brussels |
| Etihad Airways | Abu Dhabi (begins 17 December 2026) |
| Eurowings | Berlin, Düsseldorf; Seasonal: Innsbruck |
| Finnair | Helsinki |
| Icelandair | Seasonal: Reykjavík |
| Jettime | Seasonal charter: Tenerife, Zakynthos |
| KLM | Amsterdam |
| LOT Polish Airlines | Warsaw–Chopin |
| Lufthansa | Frankfurt, Munich |
| Norwegian Air Shuttle | Alicante, Barcelona, London Gatwick, Málaga, Nice, Palma de Mallorca, Pristina, Riga; Seasonal: Hurghada, Marrakesh, Tirana |
| Pegasus Airlines | Antalya, Istanbul–Sabiha Gökçen |
| Ryanair | Banja Luka, Budapest, Cagliari, Edinburgh, Gdańsk, Kaunas, Kraków, London–Stansted, Málaga, Manchester, Palma de Mallorca, Rome–Fiumicino, Zadar, Zagreb; Seasonal: Corfu, Dubrovnik, Malta, Milan–Malpensa, Pisa, Porto, Prague, Pula, Sarajevo, Thessaloniki |
| Scandinavian Airlines | Alicante, Copenhagen, Faro, Gran Canaria, Larnaca, Luleå, Málaga, Nice, Oslo, Palma de Mallorca, Salzburg, Stockholm–Arlanda; Seasonal: Athens, Chania, Fuerteventura, Ioannina, Innsbruck, Karpathos, Samos, Split, Turin, Visby, Zakynthos; Seasonal charter: Hurghada, Preveza, Rhodes, Skiathos |
| Sunclass Airlines | Seasonal charter: Antalya, Cape Verde, Chania, Gran Canaria, Hurghada, Irakleion, Kos, Larnaca, Oslo, Palma de Mallorca, Phuket, Rhodes, Tenerife |
| Swiss International Air Lines | Zürich |
| Turkish Airlines | Istanbul |
| Widerøe | Bergen |
| Wizz Air | Belgrade, Gdańsk, Rome–Fiumicino, Skopje |

=== Cargo ===
| Airlines | Destinations |
|---|---|
| DHL Aviation | Copenhagen |
| FedEx Express | Paris–Charles de Gaulle |

== Statistics ==
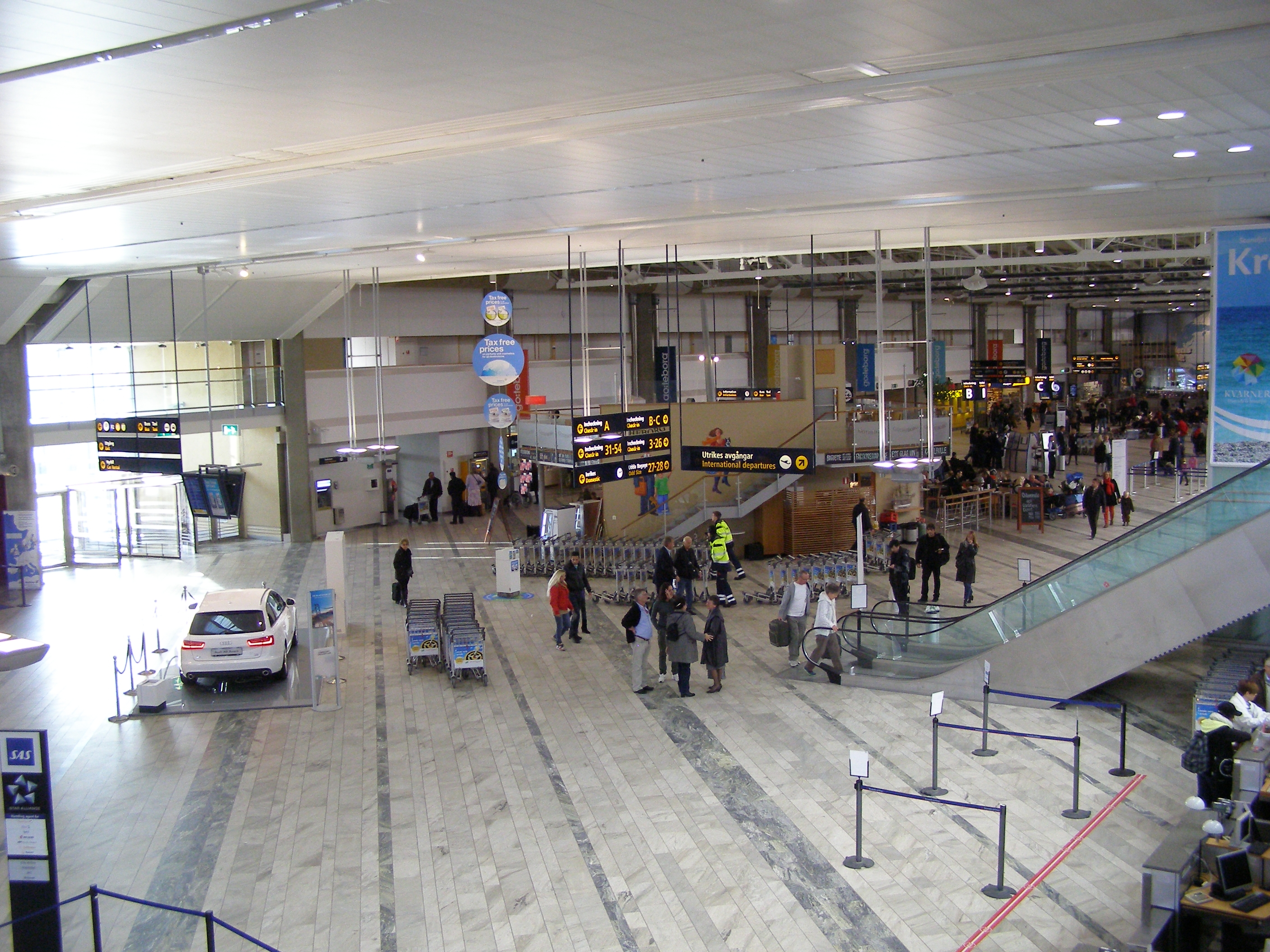
Main check-in hall

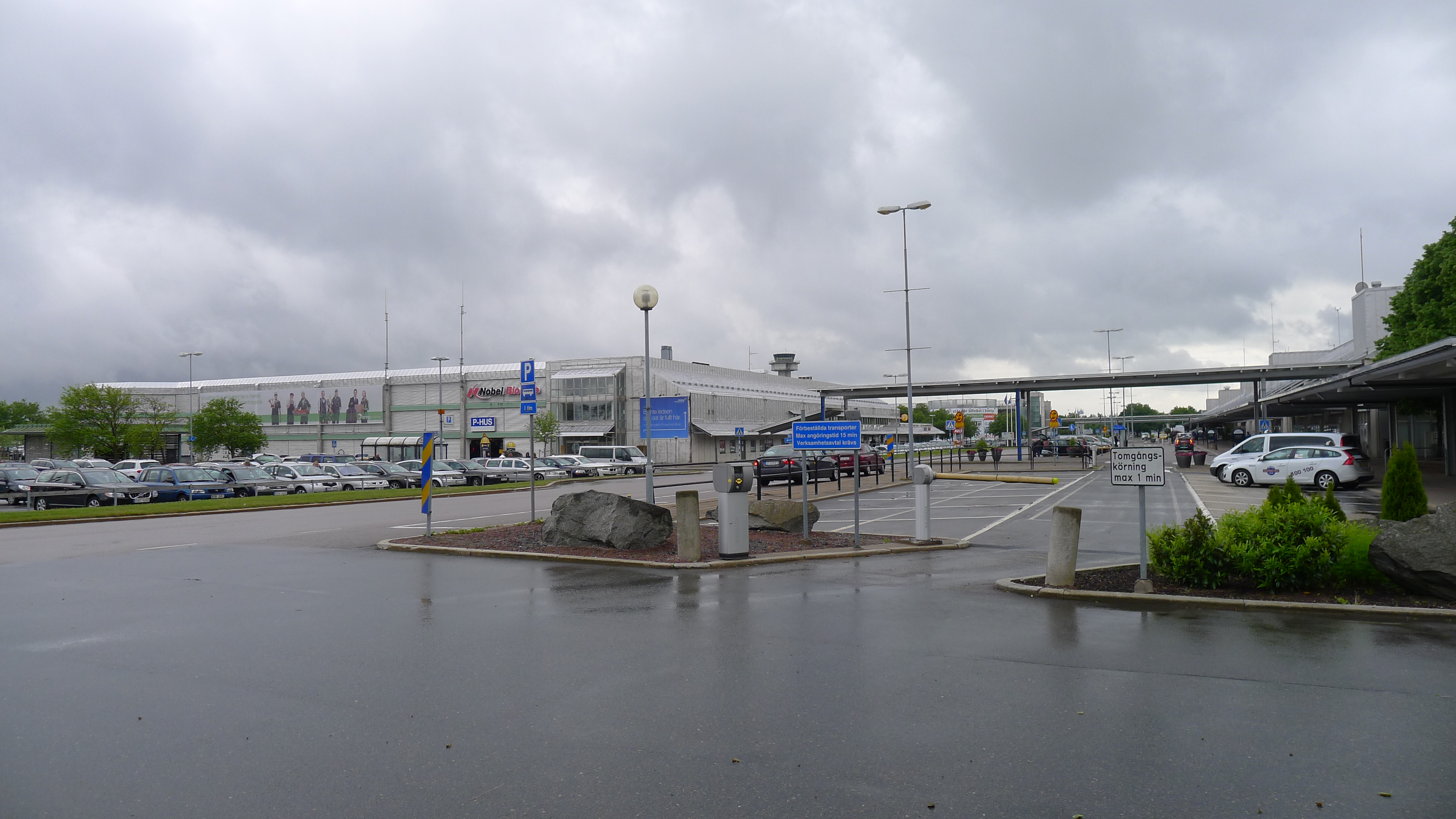
In front of the passenger terminals

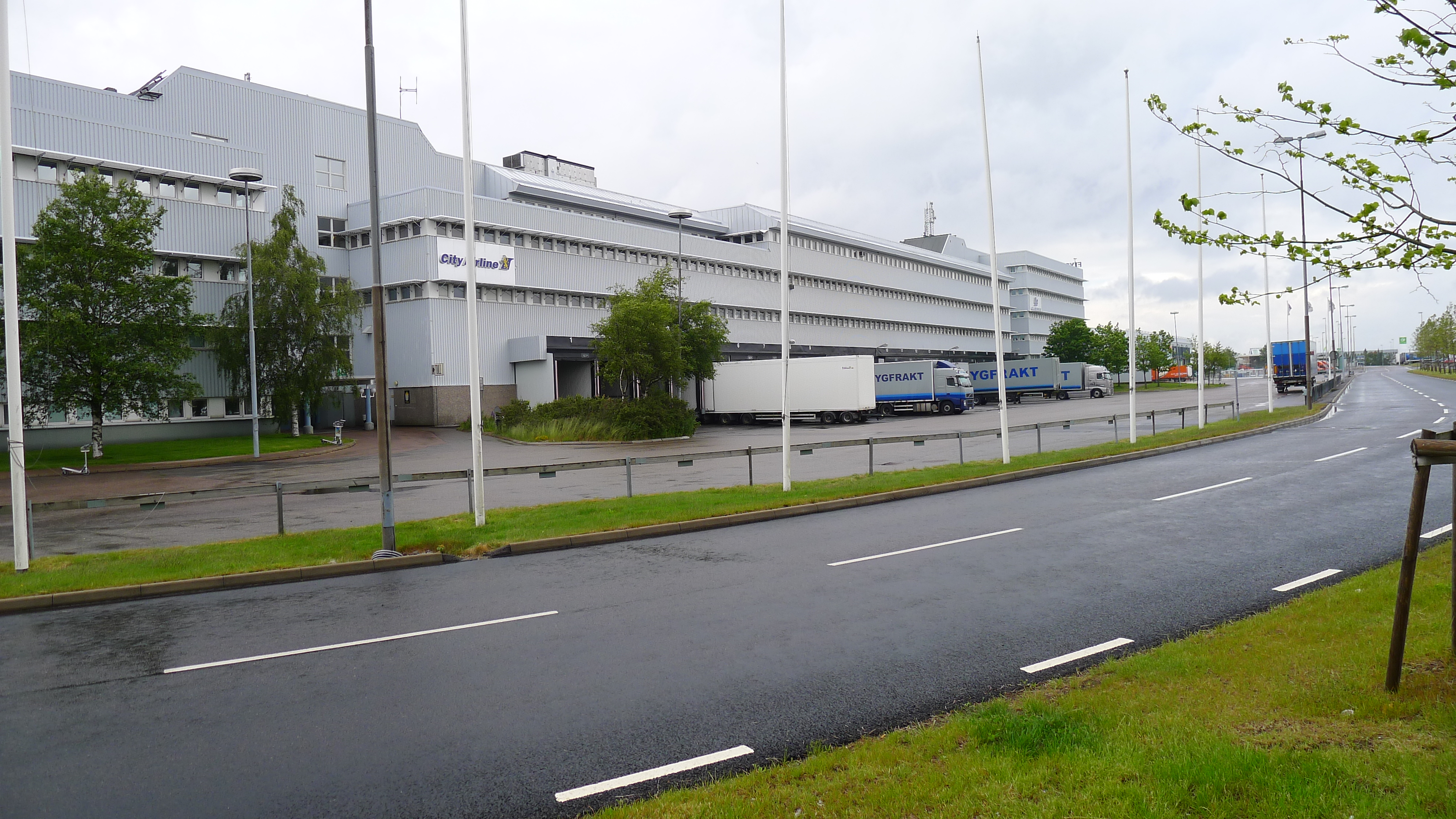
Logistics facilities

Busiest routes to and from Gothenburg Landvetter Airport (2024)
| Rank | Airport | Passengers handled | % change 2023/24 |
|---|---|---|---|
| 1 | Stockholm (Note: Includes flights to/from Stockholm–Arlanda and Stockholm–Bromma) | 497,012 | ▼19.6 |
| 2 | London (Note: Includes flights to/from London–Gatwick, London–Heathrow and London–Stansted) | 431,835 | ▲17.1 |
| 3 | Frankfurt | 359,116 | ▲2.4 |
| 4 | Amsterdam | 329,085 | ▲7.9 |
| 5 | Munich | 273,333 | ▲19.4 |
| 6 | Málaga | 214,052 | ▲9.5 |
| 7 | Alicante | 208,571 | ▲10.4 |
| 8 | Copenhagen | 194,576 | ▲39.5 |
| 9 | Helsinki | 161,869 | ▲5.0 |
| 10 | Istanbul | 143,093 | ▲0.3 |
| 11 | Brussels | 142,148 | ▲8.4 |
| 12 | Gdańsk | 135,449 | ▼1.2 |
| 13 | Paris | 123,308 | ▼1.7 |
| 14 | Palma de Mallorca | 119,735 | ▲33.8 |
| 15 | Zurich | 106,176 | ▼21.2 |
| 16 | Warsaw (Note: Includes flights to/from Warsaw–Chopin and Warsaw–Modlin) | 102,893 | ▼10.2 |
| 17 | Gran Canaria | 94,658 | ▼8.2 |
| 18 | Antalya | 83,483 | ▼1.5 |
| 19 | Kraków | 75,514 | ▲100.0 |
| 20 | Rhodes | 73,529 | ▲10.4 |

Traffic by calendar year
| Year | Passenger volume | Change | Domestic | Change | International | Change |
|---|---|---|---|---|---|---|
| 2025 | 5,434,878 | ▲1.8% | 501,140 | ▼4.7% | 4,933,738 | ▲2.5% |
| 2024 | 5,336,985 | ▲2.9% | 525,806 | ▼19.7% | 4,811,179 | ▲6.2% |
| 2023 | 5,184,645 | ▲16.6% | 654,547 | ▲8.3% | 4,530,098 | ▲17.9% |
| 2022 | 4,445,970 | ▲132.6% | 604,429 | ▲117.6% | 3,841,541 | ▲135.2% |
| 2021 | 1,911,118 | ▲21.2% | 277,777 | ▼2.6% | 1,633,341 | ▲26.4% |
| 2020 | 1,576,788 | ▼76.4% | 285,078 | ▼76.3% | 1,291,710 | ▼76.4% |
| 2019 | 6,670,892 | ▼2.0% | 1,202,793 | ▼14.3% | 5,468,099 | ▲1.2% |
| 2018 | 6,807,631 | ▲0.7% | 1,402,851 | ▼3.8% | 5,404,780 | ▲2.0% |
| 2017 | 6,758,520 | ▲6.0% | 1,458,254 | ▲0.2% | 5,300,266 | ▲7.7% |
| 2016 | 6,375,512 | ▲3.5% | 1,455,568 | ▲1.7% | 4,919,944 | ▲4.0% |
| 2015 | 6,162,456 | ▲18.1% | 1,431,039 | ▲4.5% | 4,731,417 | ▲23.0% |
| 2014 | 5,216,011 | ▲4.2% | 1,369,979 | ▲3.9% | 3,846,032 | ▲4.3% |
| 2013 | 5,004,144 | ▲3.1% | 1,318,239 | ▲1.4% | 3,685,905 | ▲3.7% |
| 2012 | 4,854,888 | | 1,300,335 | | 3,554,553 | |

== Ground transport ==
=== Bus ===
The airport is served by several shuttle services offered by different private bus companies, such as Flygbussarna, Vy bus4you and Flixbus. Rides between the airport and the Nils Ericson Terminal, located next to the Central train station take about 30 minutes, while rides connecting with the Korsvägen hub are approximately 20 minutes long.

Västtrafik, Gothenburg's public transport agency, also operates the bus line 612 between the airport and the Landvetter village bus station, where further connections to both Gothenburg and Borås can be made.

Flixbus and bus4you also offer the shuttle services, albeit less frequently, between Borås and Jönköping central stations, at least 30 min and 1 h 40 min away, respectively.

=== Road ===
The road distance to Gothenburg is 25 km (16 mi) and to Borås 40 km (25 mi), both via the Riksväg 40 motorway. There are 7,300 parking spaces at the airport.

The airport is accessible on foot and bicycle too. There is a bike path most of the way from Gothenburg, through the villages Landvetter and Härryda. The forest and hiking trails reach up to the far side of P6 long-term parking area.

=== Future High-Speed Rail Connection ===
The existing Coast-to-Coast railway passes approximately 2 km (1.2 mi) north of Landvetter Airport, where a rail connection has been discussed but has never been established.

In 2024, an agreement was reached to construct a high-speed train line connecting Gothenburg Central Station to Landvetter Airport, as part of a larger railway project between Gothenburg and Borås. The total cost of the new railway is estimated at 48.5 billion SEK. This double-track railway will accommodate speeds of up to 250 km/h (160 mph) and include stations in Mölndal, at Landvetter Airport, and in Borås. The Swedish government will provide 43.5 billion SEK for the project, while local municipalities and regions will contribute an additional 4.5 billion SEK. The first trains on this route are expected to begin operation around 2035.

== See also ==
- Civil Aviation Administration (Sweden)
- List of the busiest airports in the Nordic countries
- Västtrafik
