= Taos Air =

Virtual airline in Taos, New Mexico

IATA	ICAO	Call sign
various	various	see Operators
- Founded: 2018; Taos, New Mexico, United States
- Commenced operations: December 20, 2018
- Ceased operations: April 1, 2024
- Hubs: Taos Regional Airport
- Fleet size: 4
- Destinations: 5
- Parent company: Taos Ski Valley, Inc.

Taos Air was an American virtual airline that operated seasonal scheduled public air charter service between Taos Regional Airport in Taos, New Mexico, and several airports in California and Texas. The airline was owned by Taos Ski Valley, Inc. Service to Texas began in the 2018–2019 winter season while the 2019–2020 winter season saw the introduction of California routes. The carrier operated Fairchild Dornier 328JETs with its own livery from 2018 through summer 2022, then switched to Embraer 135 regional jets operated by JSX beginning with the 2022–2023 winter ski season. Taos Air effectively ceased operations permanently in April 2024.

== History ==
On 20 December 2018, Taos Air began service with scheduled flights from Taos Regional Airport to Dallas and Austin, Texas, using a 30-seat Dornier 328JET. The service was introduced to promote skiing in the Taos area, and free shuttle service to Taos Ski Valley was offered. Taos Air was owned by Taos Ski Valley, Inc., which paid for operation and upkeep of the aircraft, with the Town of Taos providing terminal access, marketing, de-icing service, and a hangar. The aircraft were operated on a charter basis by Ultimate Jetcharters, an FAR Part 135 air charter company that also operated scheduled charter flights under the Ultimate Air Shuttle brand name.

During its inaugural season, the carrier used a private terminal at Dallas Love Field; no Transportation Security Administration security checks were required.

In March 2019, the Taos County Board of Commissioners and the town of Taos voted to give Taos Air grants totaling $850,000 for summer service to promote tourism. On 9 April, Taos Air received final approval to operate summer flights. Despite this, the flights were canceled in June 2019 due to unavailability of aircraft and pilots from the charter company, and consequently the grant money was not disbursed.

Texas flights resumed on December 19, 2019, using a 328JET, operated by Advanced Air. In January 2020, service to Hawthorne Municipal Airport near Los Angeles, California, and McClellan-Palomar Airport near San Diego, California, was introduced as the airline acquired a second 328JET. Service for the 2019–2020 ski season was intended to continue until March 29, 2020 but was terminated on March 15, 2020 due to the COVID-19 pandemic.

On November 6, 2020, citing "the uncertainty of current and future travel restrictions to New Mexico" due to the ongoing COVID-19 pandemic, Taos Ski Valley canceled Taos Air service for the 2020–2021 winter season. In early 2021, Taos Ski Valley announced that the resort would reopen on 26 November 2021 and Taos Air service would restart around that time. In May 2021, the airline announced summer service from July 1 to September 27 2021. Summer and winter service continued through 2022 under Advanced Air. For the summer of 2022, service to Austin, Texas, was switched from the Austin-Bergstrom International Airport to the Austin Executive Airport.

Beginning with the 2022–2023 ski season, Taos Air switched operators to JSX using 30-seat Embraer 135 regional jets rather than the Dorniers. The new service began on 15 December 2022. The Texas flights operated from Love Field and Bergstrom International Airport as before, but the Los Angeles flights moved from Hawthorne to Hollywood Burbank Airport, and the San Diego flights moved from McClellan-Palomar to San Diego International Airport. With the change to JSX, Taos Air ceased using its own brand identity, but it remained contractually responsible for providing airline service at Taos Regional Airport.

Taos Air effectively terminated operations permanently on 1 April 2024 when Taos Ski Valley allowed its airline service contract with the town of Taos to expire. On 23 April 2024, the town of Taos approved a new airline service contract directly with JSX.

== Operators ==
Taos Air flights were operated by Ultimate Jetcharters for the 2018–2019 season. Advanced Air operated flights for the 2019–2020 season, 2021 summer, 2021–2022 winter, and 2022 summer seasons. JSX operated flights beginning with the 2022–2023 winter season.

== Fleet ==
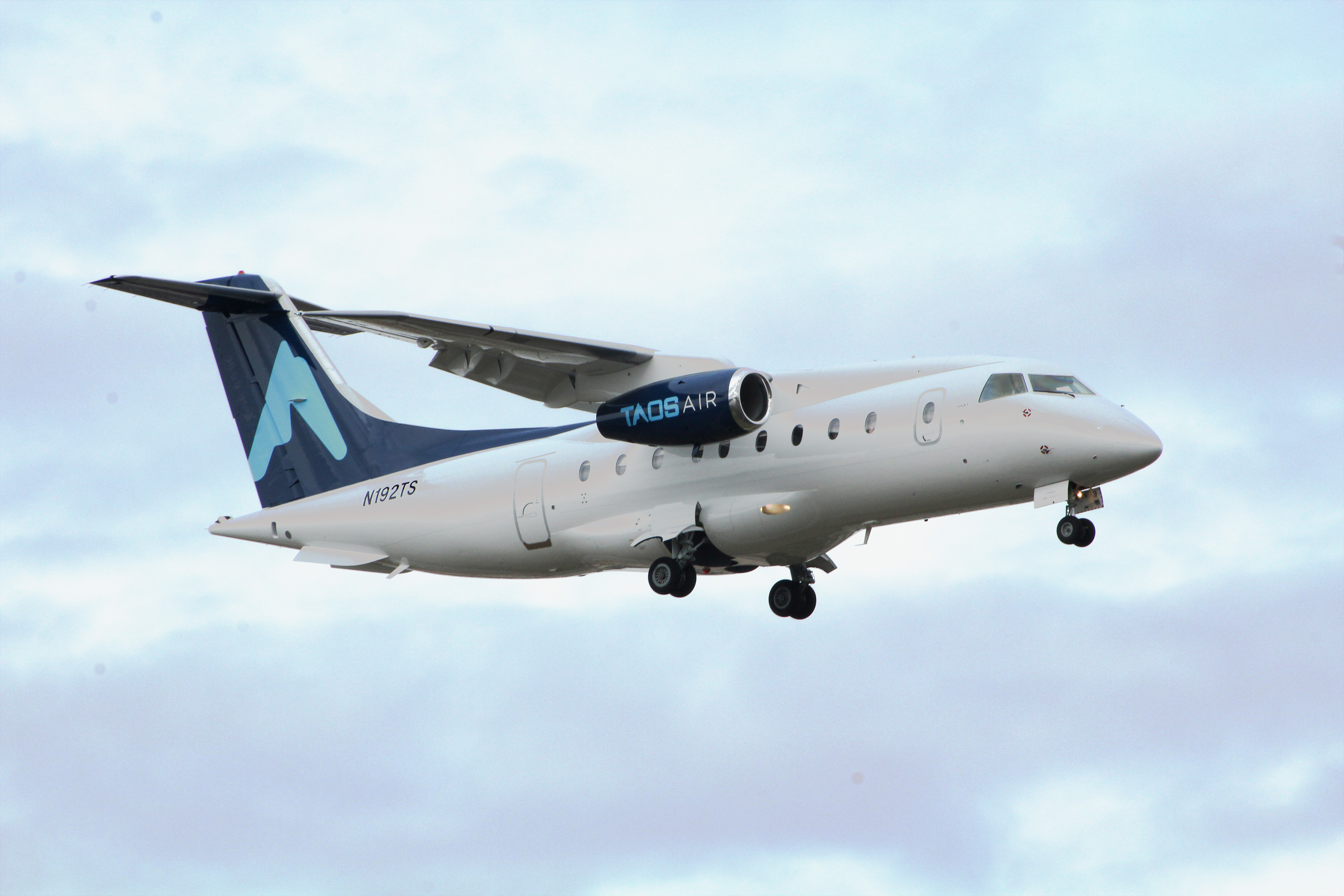
Taos Air Fairchild Dornier 328JET on approach to Dallas Love Field

The Taos Air fleet consisted of the following aircraft:

- 2 Fairchild Dornier 328JET (until September 30, 2022)
- 2 Embraer ERJ-135 regional jets (since December 15, 2022)

== Destinations ==
Taos Air served the following destinations:

- Austin, Texas - Austin–Bergstrom International Airport
- Austin, Texas - Austin Executive Airport
- Burbank, California - Hollywood Burbank Airport
- Carlsbad, California - McClellan-Palomar Airport
- Dallas, Texas - Dallas Love Field
- Hawthorne, California - Hawthorne Municipal Airport
- San Diego, California - San Diego International Airport
- Taos, New Mexico - Taos Regional Airport (hub)

== See also ==
- Air transportation in the United States
- Transportation in the United States
