= Ultimate Jet =

Airline of the United States

IATA	ICAO	Call sign
UE	UJC	ULTIMATE
- Founded: 2009; 17 years ago
- Commenced operations: July 2009
- Ceased operations: April 2025
- Fleet size: 8
- Parent company: Ultimate Jet
- Headquarters: North Canton, Ohio, U.S.
- Website: www.flyuj.com

Ultimate Jet, formerly Ultimate Jet Charters, was a private jet charter airline based in North Canton, Ohio, United States. It was the operating name of Ultimate Jetcharters LLC, an FAR Part 135 air charter carrier. Ultimate Jet operated charter passenger flights with their fleet of Citation X and Embraer ERJ135 aircraft. Ultimate Jet previously operated public charter flights on a published schedule, serving key business routes from Cincinnati Municipal Lunken Airport that were reduced by Delta Air Lines and Comair. The airline suspended scheduled service operations from late 2020 to mid 2021 and again from December 16, 2021, due to the impact of the COVID-19 pandemic on business travel.

== History ==
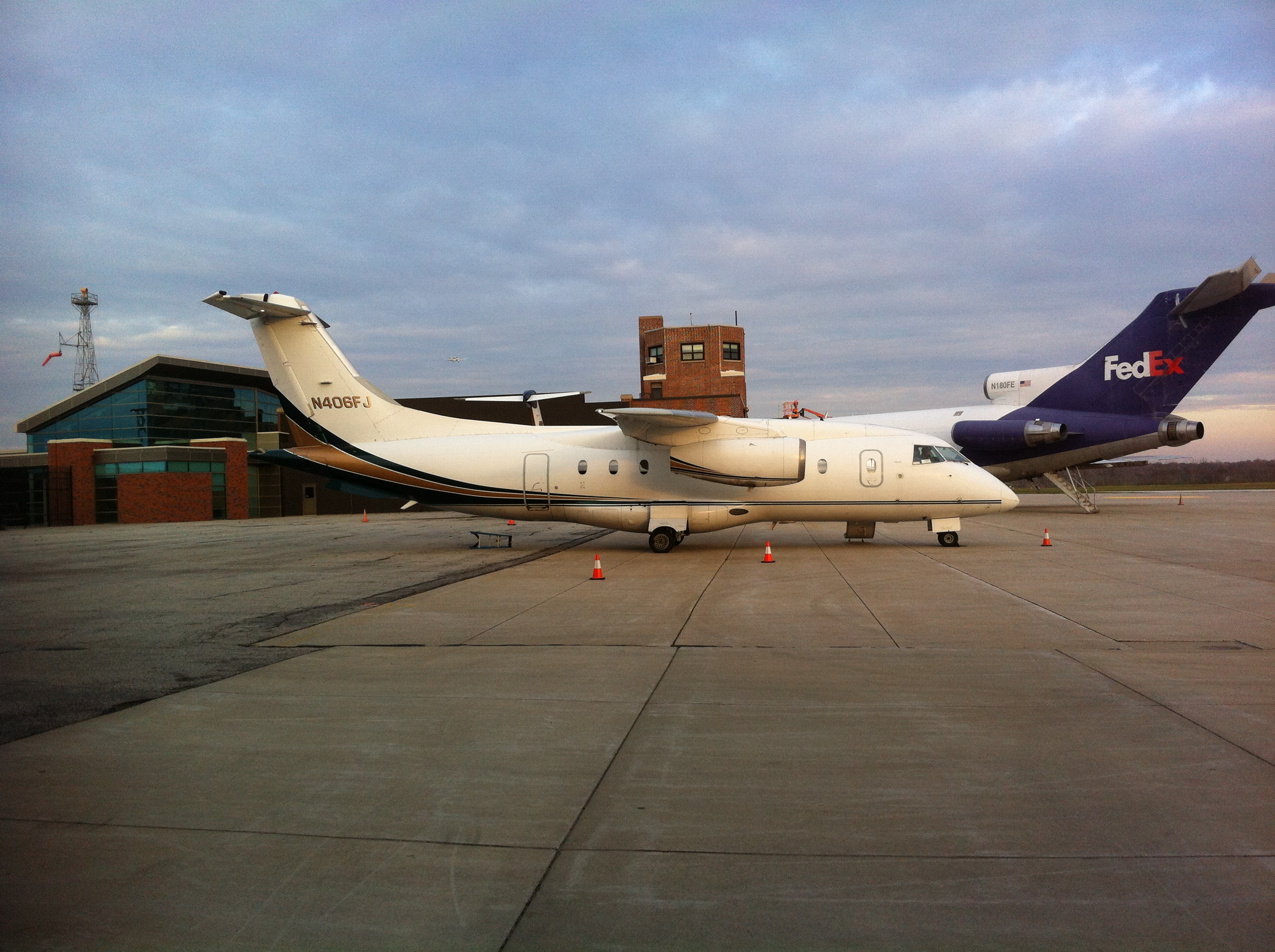
Ultimate Air Shuttle Dornier 328Jet at the Purdue University Airport, next to a FedEx Boeing 727

Ultimate Air Shuttle started operations in 2009 shortly after the merger of Delta Air Lines and Northwest Airlines in an attempt to serve destinations on a time driven basis. The airline launched with flights to New York and soon expanded to Chicago in 2010. In 2012, Detroit and Washington, D.C., were added as destinations, but the Detroit route was discontinued later that year, and the Washington, D.C. route was switched to Charlotte in 2013.

On May 12, 2015, Ultimate Air Shuttle announced that it would start flying seasonal service to Nantucket and Martha's Vineyard, Massachusetts; Westhampton Beach, New York; and from Morristown, New Jersey. After a few months of service, the Westhampton Beach destination was cancelled due to a lack of demand.

The airline has expressed interest in future markets, such as Indianapolis, Memphis, and Nashville; however, they have yet to actually start. In October 2015, Ultimate began service to Cleveland, while additionally announcing that it would add flights to Chicago Executive Airport beginning in 2016. Also, flights to DeKalb-Peachtree Airport (Atlanta) and Nashville International Airport were indicated as the next cities with service to be added in the coming year.

In May 2016, Ultimate Air Shuttle announced it would move its CVG flights to LUK in order to add an extra daily flight to Chicago-MDW and New York-MMU; however, planned flights to TEB have been delayed.

In January 2017, Ultimate Air Shuttle announced that it plans to launch flights from Lunken to DeKalb-Peachtree Airport (Atlanta).

Parent company Ultimate Jetcharters formerly operated flights for OneJet until that company suspended operations in August 2018; OneJet had attempted to acquire Ultimate Jetcharters and Ultimate Air Shuttle, but the deal fell through and Ultimate terminated the flights. Ultimate Jetcharters later operated flights for Taos Air in the winter of 2018–2019, but Taos Air changed operators for the 2019–2020 winter season.

In mid 2020, Ultimate Air Shuttle suspended scheduled service due to travel restrictions resulting from the COVID-19 pandemic. Service was briefly resumed in the summer, but was suspended again from September until an unspecified date in early 2021 because business travel had not recovered adequately. Operations were restored in the second half of 2021, but the airline announced it would suspend flights again from December 16 into 2022 due to the continuing effects that the pandemic had on business travel.

In late 2022, Ultimate Jetcharters was subcontracted to fly 48 migrants from Florida to Martha's Vineyard, a sanctuary city where the migrants were told work was waiting for them. But, upon arrival, no jobs were available. On October 16, 2023, Ultimate Air Shuttle filed for Chapter 11 bankruptcy. The company is expected to remain operating and keep flying during the bankruptcy procedure.

== Destinations ==
Ultimate Air Shuttle suspended all scheduled shuttle services on December 16, 2021, due to the continued effects of the COVID-19 pandemic and restrictions on business travel. They continued to operate chartered flights.

Ultimate Air Shuttle provided service to the following locations:

City	Airport	IATA Code	Destinations	Notes
(Georgia (U.S. state)) Georgia
Atlanta	DeKalb–Peachtree Airport	PDK	Charlotte (Suspended) Cincinnati (Suspended) Cleveland (Suspended)	
Ohio
Cincinnati	Cincinnati Municipal Lunken Airport	LUK	Atlanta-Peachtree (Suspended) Charlotte (Suspended) Cleveland (Suspended) Nashville (Suspended)	Focus City
Cleveland	Cleveland Burke Lakefront Airport	BKL	Atlanta-Peachtree (Suspended) Cincinnati (Suspended) Nashville (Suspended)	
North Carolina
Charlotte	Charlotte Douglas International Airport	CLT	Atlanta-Peachtree (Suspended) Cincinnati (Suspended)	
Tennessee
Nashville	Nashville International Airport	BNA	Cincinnati (Suspended) Cleveland (Suspended)	

=== Former destinations ===
City	Airport	IATA Code	Destinations	Notes
California
Carlsbad	McClellan-Palomar Airport	CLD	Los Angeles	Branded as BizAir Shuttle
Los Angeles	Los Angeles International Airport	LAX	Carlsbad	Branded as BizAir Shuttle
Illinois
Chicago	Chicago Midway International Airport	MDW	Cincinnati	Service was discontinuted
Indiana
Columbus	Columbus Municipal Airport	BAK	Ypsilanti (MI)	
Kentucky
Hebron	Cincinnati/Northern Kentucky International Airport	CVG	Morristown	
Massachusetts
Martha's Vineyard	Martha's Vineyard Airport	MVY	Morristown (seasonal)	
Nantucket	Nantucket Memorial Airport	ACK	Morristown (seasonal)	
Michigan
Ypsilanti	Willow Run Airport	YIP	Columbus (IN)	
New Jersey
New York City/Morristown	Morristown Municipal Airport	MMU	Chicago-Midway Cincinnati-Lunken Currituck	
New Mexico
Taos	Taos Regional Airport	TSM	Austin Dallas-Love	Branded as Taos Air
(New York (state)) New York
Westhampton Beach	Francis S. Gabreski Airport	FOK	Morristown	Ended due to low demand
North Carolina
Currituck County	Currituck County Regional Airport	ONX	Manassas Morristown	
Pennsylvania
Pittsburgh	Pittsburgh International Airport	PIT	Currituck	
Virginia
Manassas	Manassas Regional Airport	MNZ	Currituck Pittsburgh	
Washington D.C.	Washington Dulles International Airport	IAD	Cincinnati-Lunken	

== Fleet ==
The Ultimate Air Shuttle fleet consists of the following aircraft:

Ultimate Jet fleet
Aircraft	In service	Orders	Seats	Notes
Embraer ERJ-135	2	0	30	
Cessna Citation X	5	0	8	

== See also ==
- Martha's Vineyard migrant crisis
