= JSX (airline) =

Regional airline of the United States

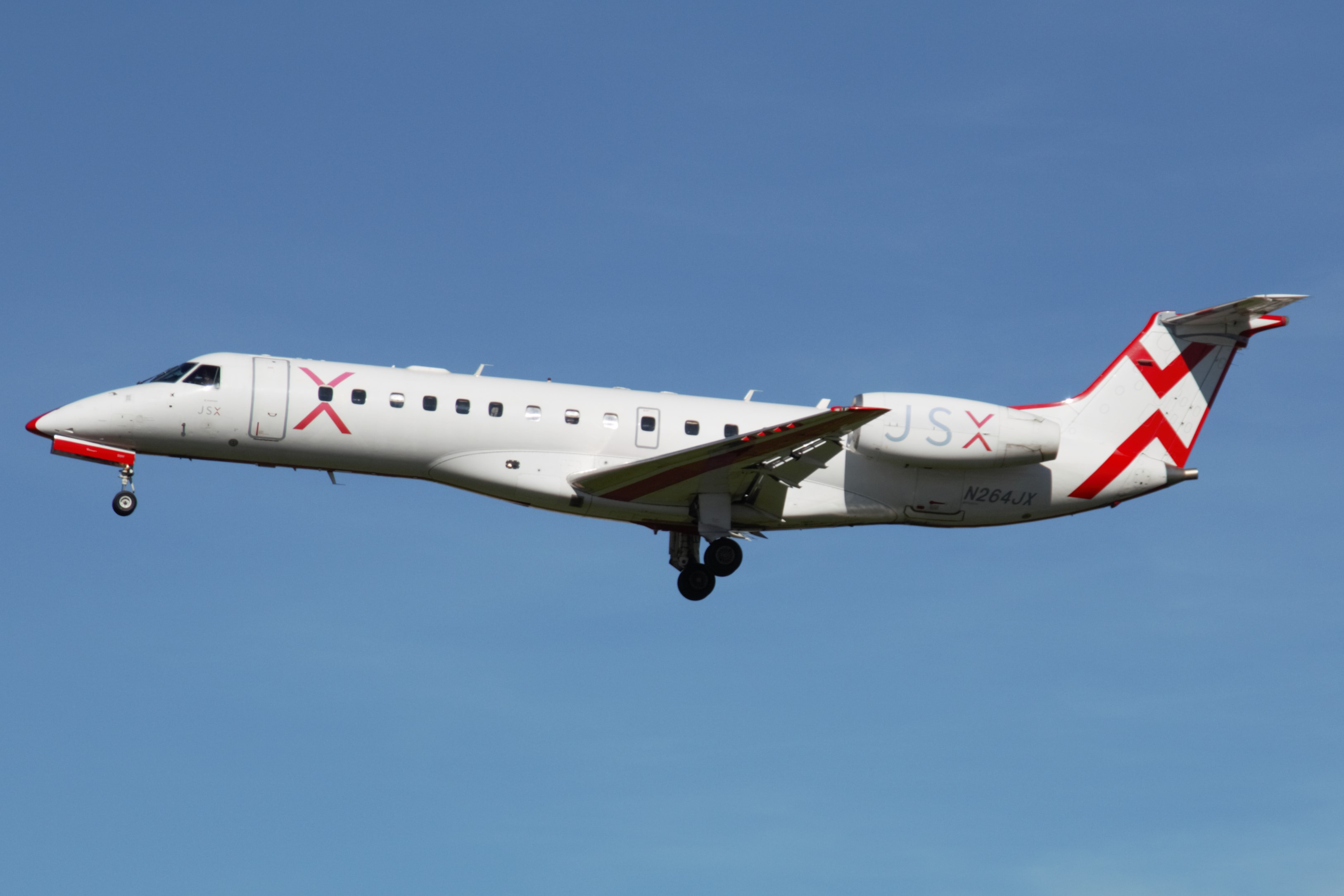
- JSX Embraer ERJ 135
IATA	ICAO	Call sign
XE	JSX	BIGSTRIPE
- Founded: April 19, 2016; 10 years ago
- AOC #: 4DPA097O
- Operating bases: Burbank; Dallas–Love; Las Vegas; Miami–Opa Locka; Oakland; Orange County; Scottsdale; White Plains
- Frequent-flyer program: Club JSX
- Fleet size: 58
- Destinations: 28
- Headquarters: Dallas, Texas, United States
- Key people: Alex Wilcox (CEO)
- Website: jsx.com

JetSuiteX, Inc. (commonly known as JSX) is an American air carrier in the United States and Mexico that describes itself as a "hop-on jet service" that operates point-to-point flights between and within Arizona, California, Colorado, Florida, Nevada, New Mexico, New York, Texas, and Utah in the United States and Baja California Sur in Mexico.

For regulatory purposes, JSX is set up as public charter operator and does not directly operate aircraft. JSX charters a 30-seat Embraer regional jet operated by a subsidiary and then resells seats on that aircraft to the public. Because charter operators have lower TSA screening requirements for passengers, the arrangement allows JSX to utilize fixed-base operator terminals, offering a more private jet-like experience for its customers.

JSX operates Embraer ERJ 135 and ERJ 145 aircraft, each retrofitted with 30 seats, removed overhead bins, and in-row power. JSX has also acquired a number of ATR 42s from the collapse of Silver Airways.

== History ==
The airline was originally founded as JetSuiteX in April 2016. According to chief executive officer (CEO) Alex Wilcox, the air carrier was created in response to declining short-haul traffic and the rise in fares on short-haul flights in the United States. Wilcox attributes these phenomena in part to long wait times in airports.

The company started operations on April 19, 2016, with its first flight between Burbank and Concord, both in California.

On August 8, 2019, JetSuiteX re-branded to JSX.

In September 2020, Orange County Board of Supervisors notified JSX that the airline would be barred from operating flights to John Wayne Airport in Orange County, California, starting January 1, 2021. Wilcox publicly addressed the situation through emails and social media, and a customer outreach program invited fliers to voice support for the carrier to continue its flights to Orange County. On December 14, 2020, JSX filed a lawsuit against the airport, stating that it has "refused to offer any accommodations" to the carrier and that the airport "discriminatorily chose" the termination "in favor of two large airlines [Allegiant and Spirit Airlines]." The first of the two operates the same routes from the airport as JSX. On December 23, 2020, the airline was granted a temporary restraining order against the airport, preventing airport officials from terminating the airline's operations on the planned date of January 1, 2021. A spokeswoman told a news outlet that the airport will comply with the order. JSX continues to operate from the airport.

On December 15, 2022, JSX began operating flights to Taos Regional Airport in Taos, New Mexico, from various airports in Texas and California on behalf of Taos Air. Taos Air effectively terminated operations permanently in April 2024, and on April 23, 2024, the town of Taos approved a new, exclusive airline service contract directly with JSX.

On July 8, 2025, Travel + Leisure named JSX the #1 Domestic Airline for the second year in a row. JSX surpassed the #2 airline, Hawaiian, by 12 points. Both years, JSX scored in the 90s on a scale of 1 to 100, a feat for any US carrier.

== Corporate affairs ==
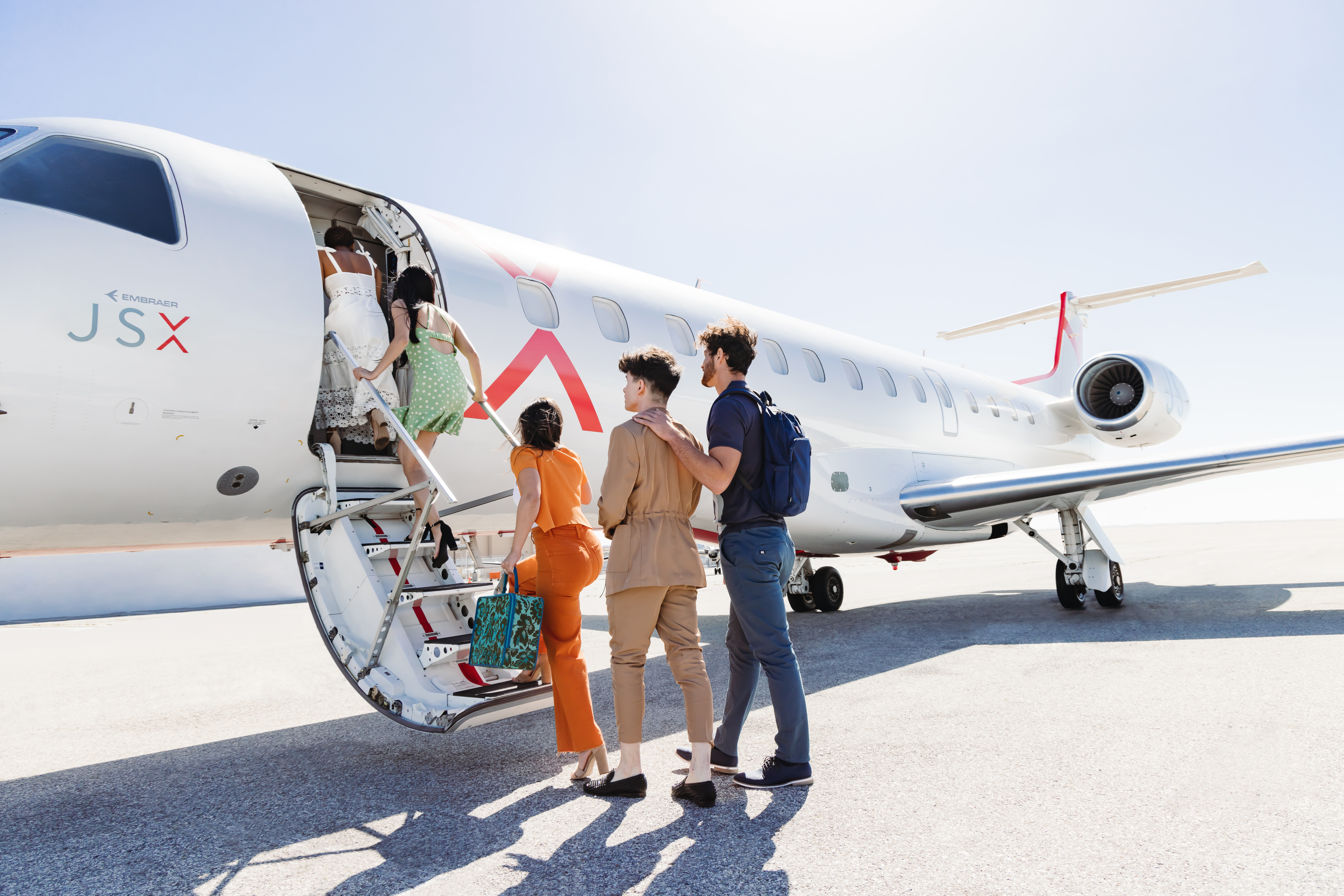
Customers boarding a JSX ERJ 145 in Burbank

JetBlue and Qatar Airways are minority shareholders in JSX. CEO Alex Wilcox was a founding executive of both JetBlue and Kingfisher Airlines.

For regulatory purposes, JSX is set up as public charter operator and does not directly operate aircraft. JetSuiteX, Inc. charters a 30-seat Embraer regional jet operated by its subsidiary Deluxe Public Charter, LLC (doing business as JSX Air or Taos Air) and then resell seats on that aircraft to the public. Because charter operators have lower TSA screening requirements for passengers, the arrangement allows JSX to utilize fixed-base operator terminals, offering a more private jet-like experience for their customers.

== Destinations ==
JSX serves or has previously served the following destinations as of May 2025:

Country (state)	City	Airport	Notes	Ref.
The Bahamas	Marsh Harbour	Marsh Harbour Airport	Terminated	
Mexico	Cabo San Lucas	Cabo San Lucas International Airport		
Mexico	San Jose del Cabo	Los Cabos International Airport	Terminated	
United States (Arizona)	Phoenix	Phoenix Sky Harbor International Airport	Terminated	
United States (Arizona)	Scottsdale	Scottsdale Airport	Base	
United States (California)	Burbank	Hollywood Burbank Airport	Base	
United States (California)	Carlsbad	McClellan–Palomar Airport		
United States (California)	Coachella Valley	Jacqueline Cochran Regional Airport	Terminated	
United States (California)	Concord	Buchanan Field Airport		
United States (California)	Los Angeles	Los Angeles International Airport		
United States (California)	Mammoth Lakes	Mammoth Yosemite Airport	Terminated	
United States (California)	Monterey	Monterey Regional Airport	Seasonal	
United States (California)	Napa County	Napa County Airport	Seasonal	
United States (California)	Oakland	Oakland San Francisco Bay Airport		
United States (California)	Orange County	John Wayne Airport		
United States (California)	San Diego	San Diego International Airport	Terminated	
United States (California)	San Jose	San Jose International Airport	Terminated	
United States (California)	Santa Monica	Santa Monica Airport		
United States (Colorado)	Broomfield	Rocky Mountain Metropolitan Airport	Terminated	
United States (Colorado)	Gunnison	Gunnison–Crested Butte Regional Airport	Seasonal	
United States (Colorado)	Rifle	Garfield County Regional Airport	Terminated	
United States (Colorado)	Centennial	Centennial Airport		
United States (Florida)	Boca Raton	Boca Raton Airport	Terminated	
United States (Florida)	Destin	Destin Executive Airport	Seasonal	
United States (Florida)	Fort Lauderdale	Fort Lauderdale Executive Airport		
United States (Florida)	Miami	Miami International Airport	Terminated	
United States (Florida)	Miami	Miami-Opa Locka Executive Airport	Base	
United States (Florida)	Naples	Naples Airport	Seasonal	
United States (Florida)	Orlando	Orlando International Airport	Terminated	
United States (Florida)	West Palm Beach	Palm Beach International Airport		
United States (Montana)	Bozeman	Bozeman Yellowstone International Airport	Terminated	
United States (Nevada)	Las Vegas	Harry Reid International Airport	Base	
United States (Nevada)	Reno	Reno-Tahoe International Airport		
United States (New Jersey)	Morristown	Morristown Municipal Airport	Terminated	
United States (New Jersey)	Teterboro	Teterboro Airport		
United States (New Mexico)	Hobbs	Lea County Regional Airport		
United States (New Mexico)	Santa Fe	Santa Fe Regional Airport	Terminated	
United States (New Mexico)	Taos	Taos Regional Airport	Seasonal	
United States (New York)	Westchester County	Westchester County Airport		
United States (North Carolina)	Pinehurst	Moore County Airport	Terminated	
United States (Tennessee)	Nashville	Nashville International Airport	Terminated	
United States (Texas)	Austin	Austin–Bergstrom International Airport	Terminated	
United States (Texas)	Austin	Austin Executive Airport	Seasonal	
United States (Texas)	Dallas	Dallas Love Field	Base	
United States (Texas)	Horseshoe Bay	Horseshoe Bay Resort Jet Center	Terminated	
United States (Texas)	Houston	William P. Hobby Airport		
United States (Texas)	Lajitas	Lajitas International Airport		
United States (Utah)	Salt Lake City	Salt Lake City International Airport		
United States (Washington)	Seattle	Boeing Field	Terminated	

=== Codeshare agreements ===
JSX does not participate in any major global airline alliances, but held a codeshare agreement with JetBlue, which includes JetBlue's TrueBlue loyalty program, up until February 2026.

It is also possible for passengers to enter United Airlines MileagePlus numbers to earn miles on JSX.

Since all flights operate from private fixed-base operator terminals, there are no ticketing or baggage agreements at any location.

== Fleet ==
As of June 2026, JSX operates the following aircraft:

JSX fleet
Aircraft	In service	Orders	Passengers	Notes
ATR 42-600	3	—	30	Deliveries began late 2025.
Embraer ERJ-135	15	—	30	
Embraer ERJ-145	40	—	30	
Total	58	—		

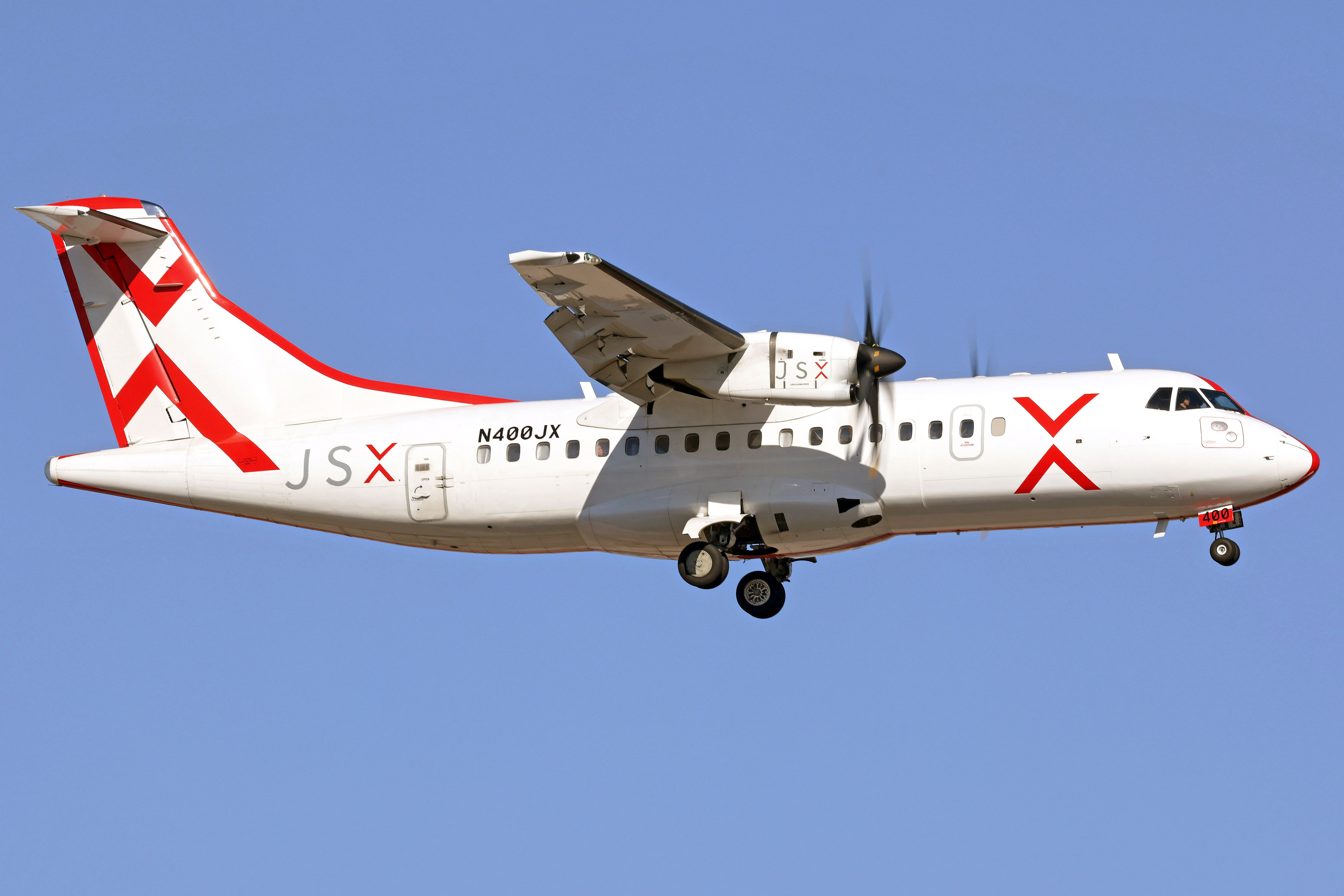
ATR 42-600

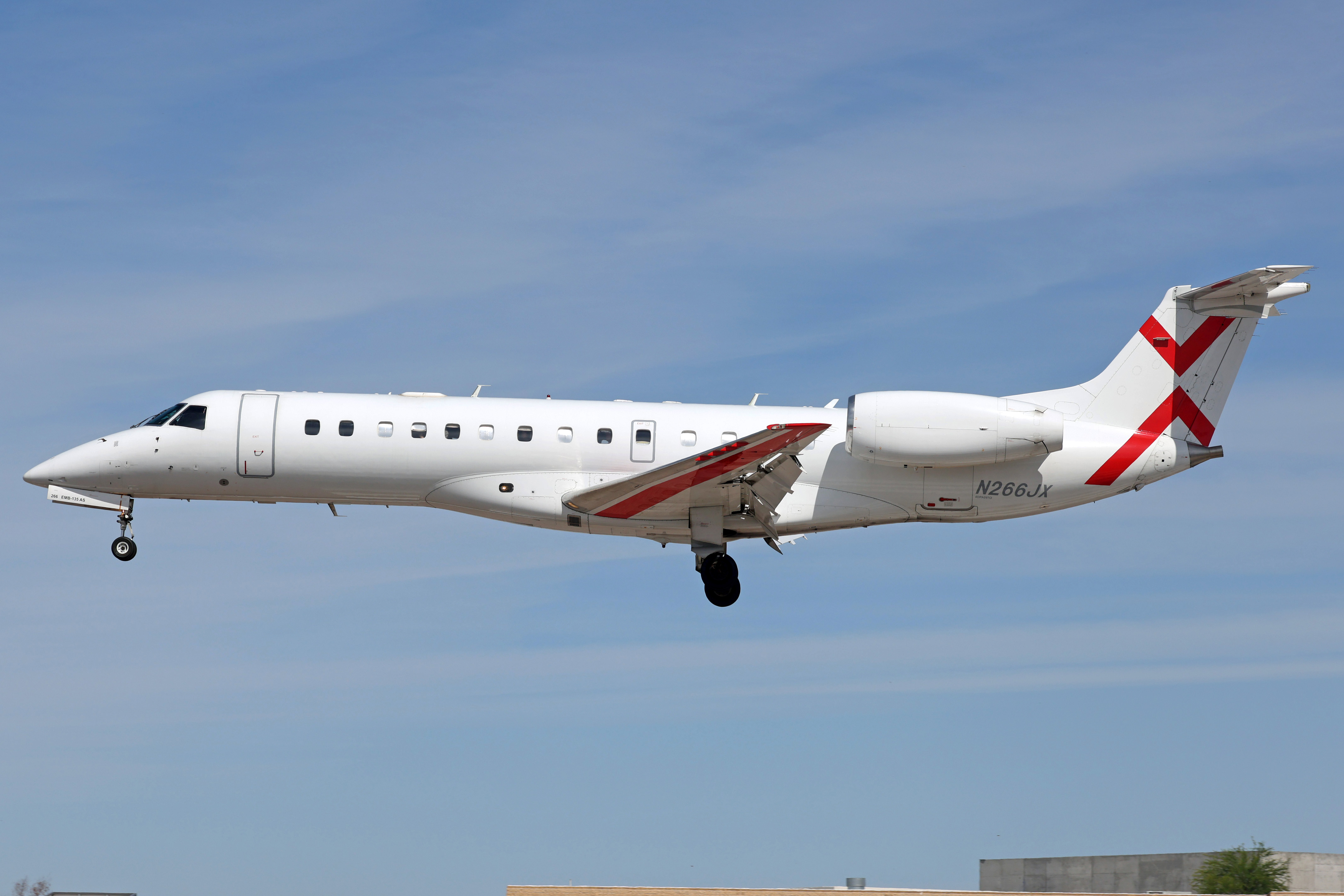
ERJ-135

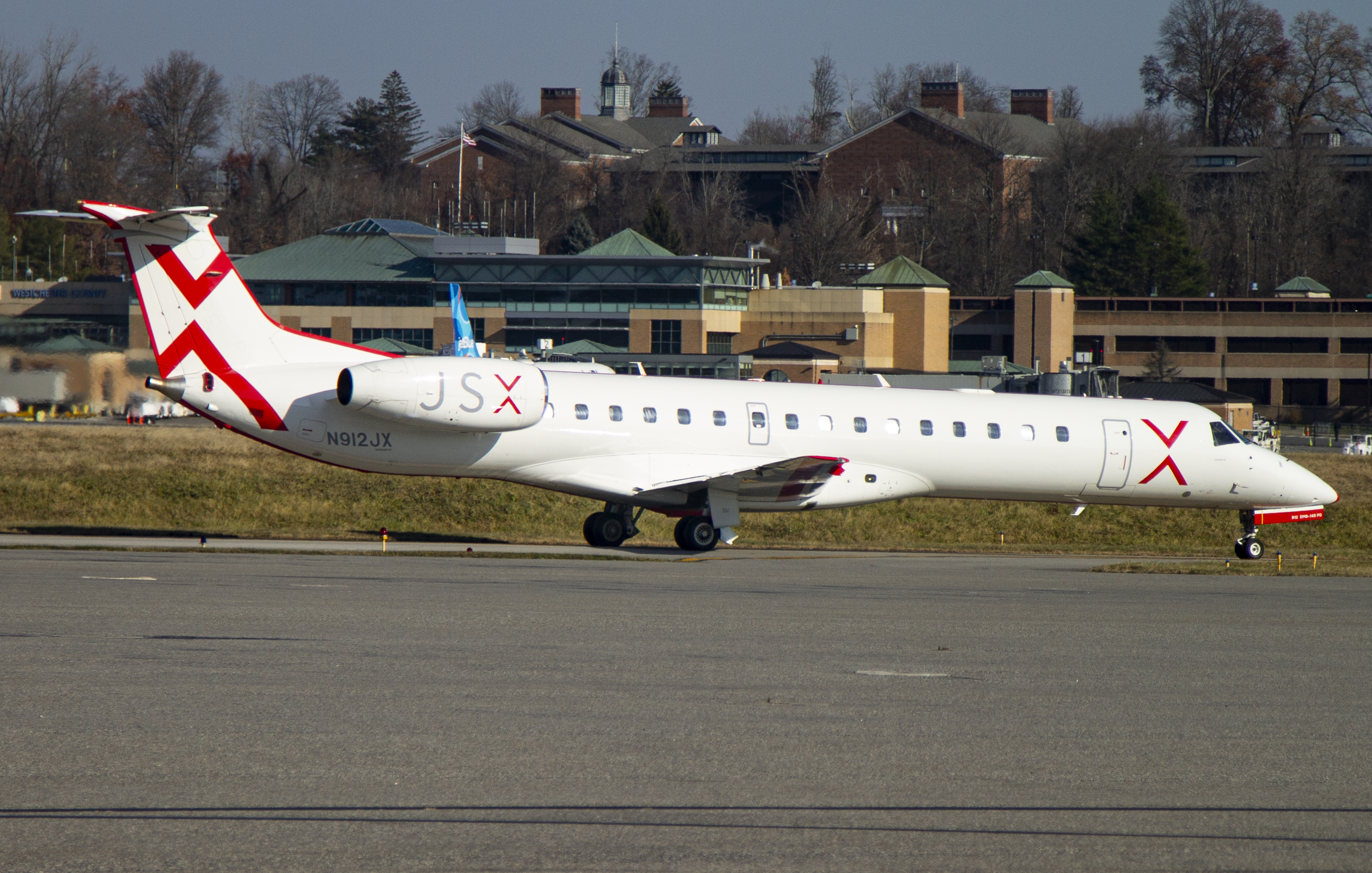
ERJ-145

== Incidents ==
On May 3, 2024, JSX Flight 284 from Dallas Love Field Airport to Houston William P. Hobby Airport operated by an Embraer ERJ-145LR with the registration of N942JX had the left main landing gear collapse during a low-speed roll out. One crew member sustained minor injuries, and the aircraft was written off.

== Services ==
JSX flights depart from private jet terminals separate from the passenger terminals used by Part 121 and some Part 135 airlines, commonly referred to as FBOs. In most locations, the facility is operated by JSX, while in some, JSX utilizes existing facilities managed by other companies. JSX utilizes the TSA Secure Flight program and additional passive security measures, including explosive and weapons detection.
