= Taos Regional Airport =

Airport in New Mexico, United States of America

- IATA: TSM; ICAO: KSKX; FAA LID: SKX

Summary
- Airport type: Public
- Owner: Town of Taos
- Serves: Taos, New Mexico
- Elevation AMSL: 7,095 ft (2,163 m)
- Coordinates: 36°27′29″N 105°40′21″W

Map
- Location of airport in New Mexico / United States SKX (the United States)

Runways
Direction	Length		Surface
Direction	ft	m	Surface
4/22	5,504	1,678	Asphalt
13/31	8,600	2,621	Asphalt

Statistics (2022)
- Aircraft operations (year ending 4/25/2022): 7,000
- Based aircraft: 30
- Source: Federal Aviation Administration

Taos Regional Airport (IATA: TSM, ICAO: KSKX, FAA LID: SKX) is a public use airport eight nautical miles (15 km) northwest of the central business district of Taos, in Taos County, New Mexico, United States. It is owned by the Town of Taos. FAA's National Plan of Integrated Airport Systems for 2009–2013 classifies it as a general aviation airport.

Although many U.S. airports use the same three-letter location identifier for the FAA and IATA, this airport is assigned SKX by the FAA and TSM by the IATA (which assigned SKX to Saransk Airport in Saransk, Russia).

== Facilities ==
Taos Regional Airport covers 832 acres (337 ha) at an elevation of 7,095 feet (2,163 m) above mean sea level. It opened in March, 1967 with one runway designated 4/22 with an asphalt surface 5,504 by 75 feet (1,678 x 23 m). On August 25, 2017, a second runway was opened. Designated 13/31, it also has asphalt surface, and is 8,600 by 100 feet (2,621 x 30 m). The ground breaking for a new 7500 square foot terminal building began in early 2025 and is planned to be completed by the end of 2025. This will replace the former 1473 square foot terminal.

For the 12-month period ending April 25, 2022, the airport had 7,000 aircraft operations, an average of 134 per week. These operations included 94% general aviation, 3% air taxi, and 3% military. At that time, there were 30 aircraft based at the airport: 22 single-engine, 2 multi-engine 2 helicopter and 4 ultralight.

== Airlines and destinations ==
=== Passenger ===
Airlines	Destinations	Refs
Contour Airlines	Seasonal: Denver	
JSX	Seasonal: Austin–Executive, Dallas–Love	

=== Historical airline service ===
The Taos Regional Airport first opened in March 1967 as the Taos Municipal Airport. Taos has seen scheduled airline service by several commuter and regional air carriers. The first known carrier was Trans Central Airlines which provided service to Albuquerque during the winter of 1968/1969. The Santa Fe Airline Company provided service in 1973 and 1974 with flights to Santa Fe and Albuquerque. In 1974 and 1975, Mountain Air provided flights to Denver, Santa Fe, and Albuquerque. Zia Airlines from 1975 through 1978 operated flights to Santa Fe and Albuquerque. Mesa Airlines came to Taos from 1987 through 1991 with flights to Albuquerque and seasonal service to Denver using Beechcraft 99, Beechcraft 1300, and Cessna 208 Caravan aircraft. Rio Grande Air, based in Taos, operated flights to Santa Fe, Los Alamos, and Albuquerque from 1999 through 2004 also using Cessna Caravans. Other carriers which briefly operated flights to Albuquerque were: JetAire in 1985, Sierra West in 1987, and Westward in 2005. During the winter ski season of 2000–01, Ozark Airlines (later changed to Great Plains Airlines) operated twice-weekly flights to Dallas/Ft. Worth using 32-seat Fairchild Dornier 328JET regional jets.

There was no commercial service from 2005 until late 2018 when Taos Air, a new virtual airline operated by the Taos Ski Valley, began winter ski-season service with flights to Austin and Dallas Love Field airport also using Fairchild Dornier 328Jets. During the 2019–20 ski season, Taos Air expanded with flights to Los Angeles via the Hawthorne Municipal Airport and to San Diego via the McClellan–Palomar Airport. There was no service during the 2020–21 season due to the COVID-19 pandemic in New Mexico, but service resumed later in 2021 with flights during the summer season. In June 2022, service to Austin was moved to Austin Executive Airport. In December 2022, Taos Air switched operators to JSX and started using JSX's Embraer 135 and Embraer 145 regional jet aircraft. Alongside this change saw Austin service return to Austin-Bergstrom International Airport, Hawthorne was moved to Hollywood Burbank Airport, and McClellan-Palomar was moved to San Diego International Airport. During the 2023/2024 winter ski season, Austin service was moved back to the Austin Executive Airport and San Diego service was moved back to the McClellan-Palomar airport near Carlsbad, California. In May 2024, the virtual name of Taos Air was discontinued and JSX announced renewed service to Dallas Love Field and a new route to Denver-Rocky Mountain, both beginning in June 2024 for the summer season. The new service to Denver was planned to operate year-round while the Dallas flights will still operate only during the summer and winter seasons. New service to Las Vegas, Nevada operated through the month of October 2024. Service to Dallas resumed in early November 2024 and regular winter service to Austin, Burbank, and Carlsbad/San Diego, California resumed in December 2024. All service, including Dallas and Denver, ended for the season on March 31, 2025. New year-round service to the Denver International Airport operated by Contour Airlines using Embraer regional jets, began on June 26, 2025. JSX continues to provide service to Dallas, Austin, Burbank, and San Diego (via the Carlsbad, CA airport) during the summer and winter months.

== Accidents and incidents ==
- March 1, 1991: The pilot of a Cessna T210M, registration number N761MU, was killed when the aircraft crashed about 1.5 miles (2.4 km) north of the airport after departing in freezing rain and snow. The accident was attributed to the pilot's decision to take off in icing conditions exceeding the aircraft's ability to continue flight. A contributing factor was inadequate pre-flight deicing.
- March 29, 1992: A Rockwell 690A, registration number N111FL, crashed into rising terrain after taking off at night in low visibility. The pilot and four passengers were seriously injured and one passenger was killed. The accident was attributed to the pilot's failure to maintain the climb, compounded by poor visibility.
- February 24, 2000: A Cessna 182E, registration number N2988Y, crashed during a visual flight rules (VFR) approach at night. The pilot and sole occupant, who reported difficulty seeing the runway due to snowfall, was killed. The accident was attributed to continued VFR into IMC.
- November 8, 2002: An IAI 1124A Westwind, registration number N61RS, crashed during an Instrument Landing System (ILS) approach, killing both pilots. The accident was attributed to "The pilot's inadvertent flight into mountain wave weather conditions while IMC, resulting in a loss of aircraft control."
- July 10, 2013: A Flight Design CTSW, registration number N424CT, flew into sudden extreme turbulence while maneuvering in the airfield traffic pattern; the aircraft dropped, rolled, and crashed, killing one pilot and seriously injuring the other. Investigators determined that the aircraft had flown into a dust devil, resulting in a loss of control.
- June 18, 2015: A Northwing Design Apache Sport ultralight trike, registration number N51311, suddenly "[fell] out of the sky" during a right turn soon after takeoff, crashing and killing the pilot. Investigators were unable to determine a reason for the pilot's apparent loss of aircraft control.
