= Harry Reid International Airport =

International airport serving Las Vegas, Nevada, United States

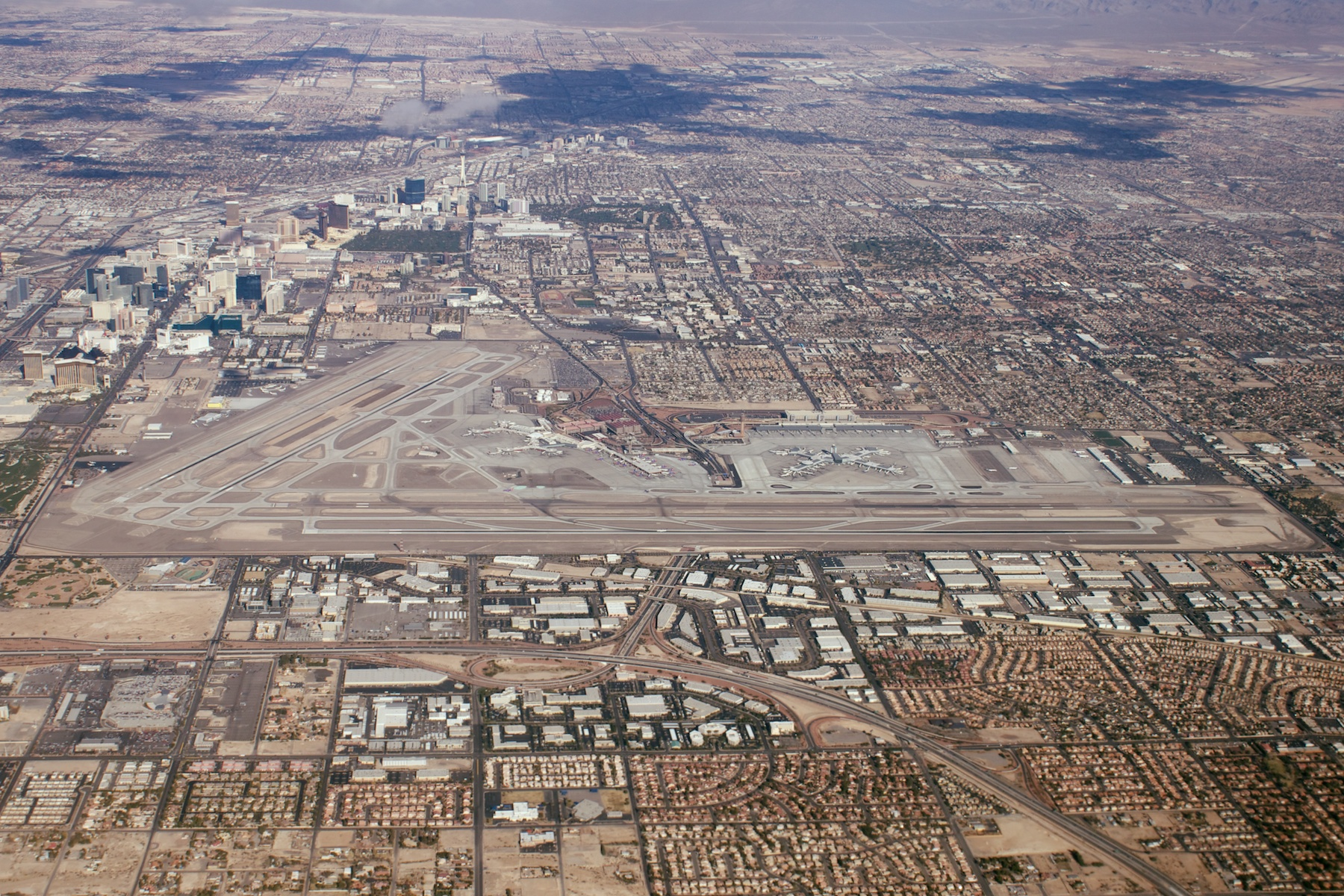
- Aerial view of the airport in 2012.
- IATA: LAS; ICAO: KLAS; FAA LID: LAS; WMO: 72386

Summary
- Airport type: Public
- Owner: Clark County, Nevada
- Operator: Clark County Department of Aviation
- Serves: Las Vegas Valley
- Location: Paradise, Nevada, U.S.
- Opened: January 1943; 83 years ago
- Operating base for: Allegiant Air; Frontier Airlines; JSX; Southwest Airlines
- Elevation AMSL: 2,181 ft (665 m)
- Coordinates: 36°04′48″N 115°09′08″W
- Website: www.harryreidairport.com

Maps
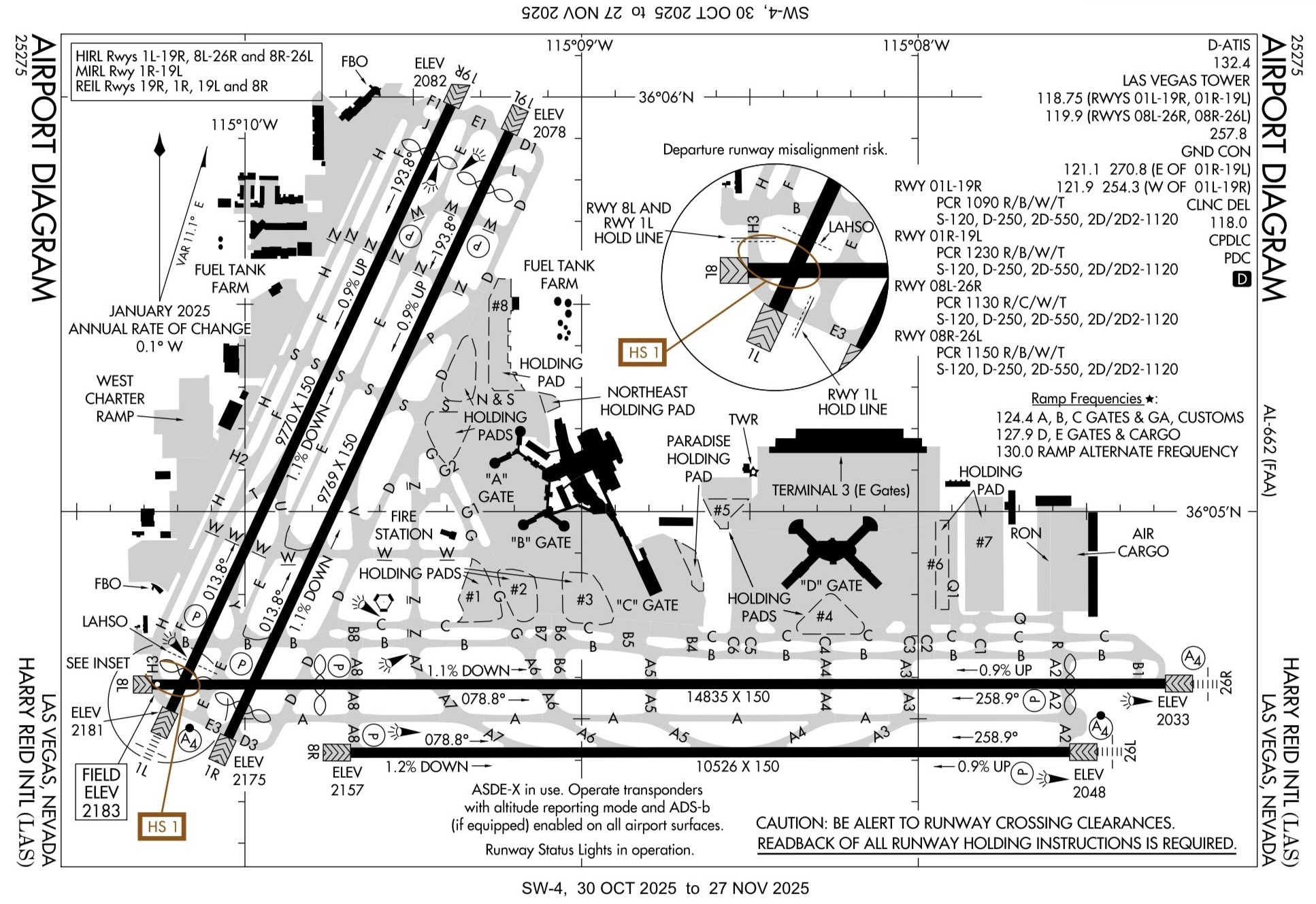
- FAA airport diagram
- Interactive map of Harry Reid International Airport

Runways
Direction	Length		Surface
Direction	ft	m	Surface
1R/19L	9,769	2,978	Asphalt/concrete
1L/19R	9,770	2,978	Asphalt/concrete
8R/26L	10,526	3,208	Asphalt/concrete
8L/26R (Note: Runway 8L is 12,374 feet (3,772 metres) with a displaced threshold of 2,461 feet (750 metres) and 26R is 13,431 feet (4,094 metres) with a displaced threshold of 1,404 feet (428 metres). Thus aircraft landing on 8L or 26R will have to avoid touching down on the displaced threshold but may use it for departures.)	14,835	4,522	Concrete

Statistics (2025)
- Passengers: 54,989,185 ▼5.9%
- Aircraft movements: 586,871
- Cargo (lbs.): 213,746,765
- Source: Harry Reid Int'l Airport

Harry Reid International Airport (IATA: LAS, ICAO: KLAS, FAA LID: LAS), formerly McCarran International Airport until 2021, is an international airport serving Las Vegas as well as the surrounding Las Vegas Valley in Nevada, United States. It is located approximately five miles (8 km; 4 nmi) south of downtown Las Vegas, in the unincorporated area of Paradise, and covers 2,800 acres (4.4 sq mi; 11.3 km^{2}) of land.

Clark County owns the facility and its Department of Aviation, under purview of the Clark County Commission oversees airport operations.

In December 2021, the Clark County Commission renamed the airport to Harry Reid International Airport in honor of former U.S. Senator Harry Reid of Nevada, citing a desire to reflect community values better and move away from the legacy of its previous namesake.

The airport has four runways and two main passenger terminals (Terminal 1 and Terminal 3) with a total of five concourses; the terminal areas are served by an automated people mover system that connects the central terminal with gate concourses. Reid is one of the few U.S. commercial airports with legalized gaming on airport premises; along with Reno–Tahoe International Airport, it retains slot machines in its passenger terminals under Nevada gaming laws.

The airport opened in January 1943 as Alamo Field and initially catered to general aviation. In December 1948, it was rechristened for U.S. senator Pat McCarran, and commercial airlines shifted to it from the Las Vegas Army Airfield. Passenger counts increased in the 1950s as the Strip expanded, leading to the construction of a new terminal. McCarran was among the first to implement radio-frequency identification of baggage. Terminal 3 was added in 2012, and the airport was renamed in honor of Senator Reid in 2021.

Reid is served by over 30 airlines and is an operating base for Allegiant Air, Frontier Airlines, JSX, and Southwest Airlines. Southwest became its dominant carrier in the 1990s. In 2024, over 58.4 million passengers passed through the airport. Reid has international flights to cities in Asia, Europe, and North America.

== History ==
Logo under the airport's former name

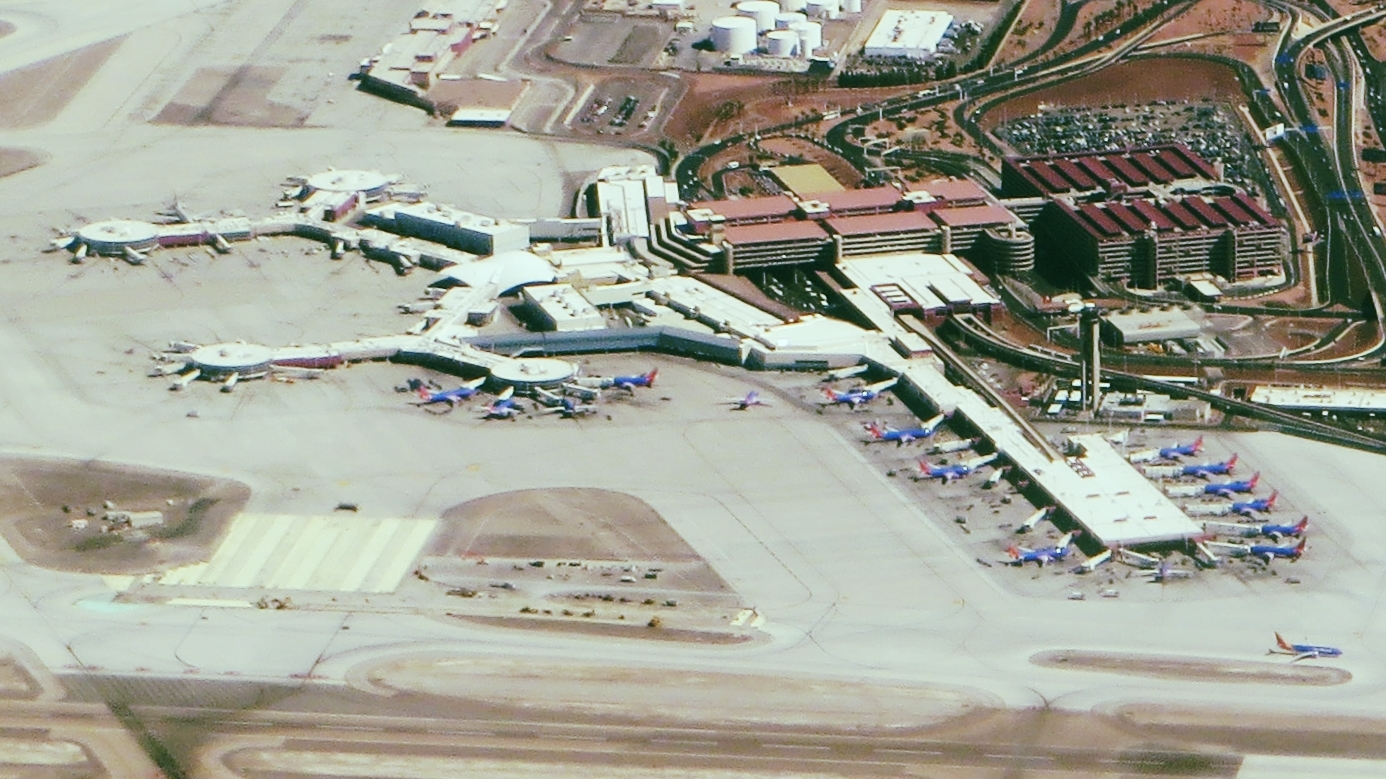
Aerial view of Terminal 1

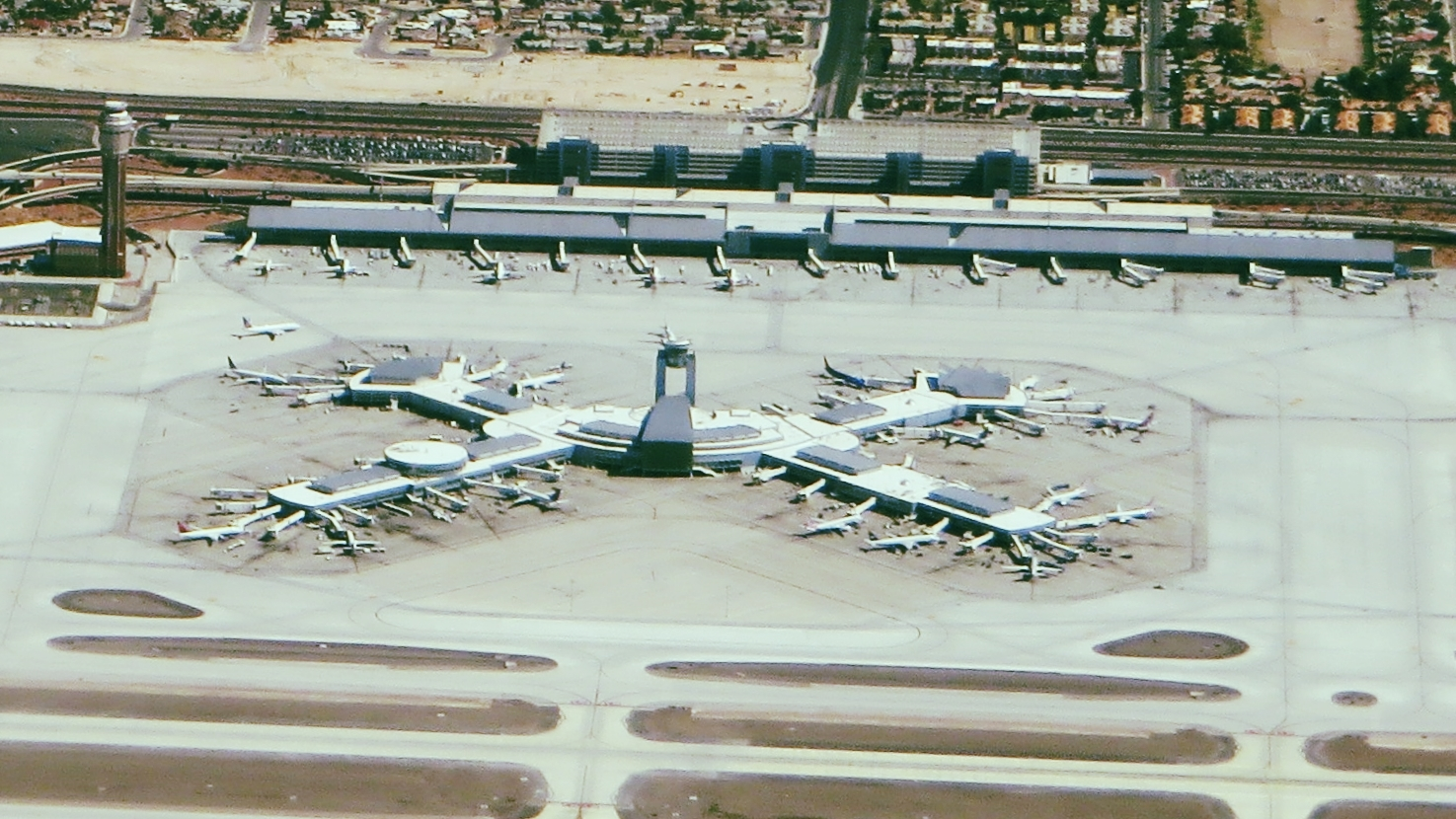
Aerial view of Terminal 3

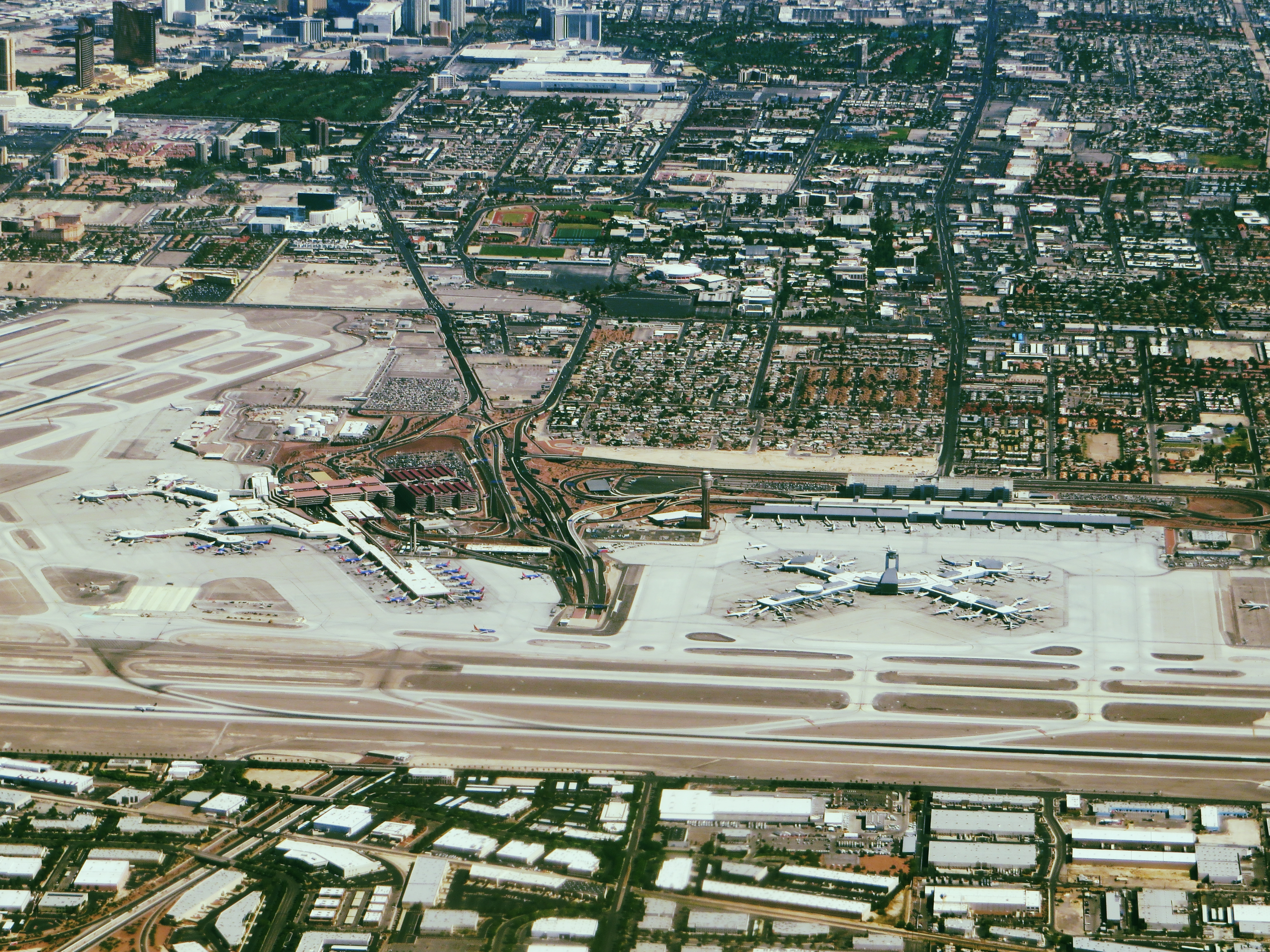
Aerial view in 2015

=== Origins ===
George Crockett, a flight instructor, built Alamo Field in 1942 on the site currently occupied by Harry Reid Airport. Crockett named it in honor of his forefather Davy Crockett, who had fought in the Battle of the Alamo. The airfield opened in January 1943. It catered to general aviation and included three gravel runways, a flight school, and a terminal building. Meanwhile, all commercial airlines flew into the Las Vegas Army Airfield. They shared the facility with the Army Air Forces, which had been operating an air base there since the attack on Pearl Harbor. The base closed in 1946.

With the onset of the Cold War, the military said it was amenable to reopening the base, but it wanted the airlines to move elsewhere. Crockett was willing to let them use his airfield, so the Clark County Commission entered into negotiations with him. In the meantime, the county held a bond election to fund construction work that would enable Alamo Field to handle commercial operations. Proponents of the bond issue, who included the chamber of commerce and casino executives, sought the economic benefits of both an air base and a modern airport capable of serving the increasing numbers of tourists that they expected to arrive. Voters approved the bond in 1947. With the help of U.S. senator Pat McCarran of Nevada, the county finalized a deal with Crockett to purchase his airfield the following year. On December 19, 1948, the airport was renamed McCarran Field and began receiving passenger flights.

=== Expansion ===
The growth of the Las Vegas casino industry during the 1950s fueled a rise in air traffic; the city went from receiving 36,000 passengers in 1948 to nearly one million in 1959. In September 1960, United Airlines became the first carrier to offer jet flights to Las Vegas. The airport was ill-equipped to handle the increasing passenger counts and the advent of commercial jetliners. Consequently, the county built a new terminal, which opened in March 1963. Another expansion project, which included adding Concourses A and B and lengthening the runways, ended in 1974. However, traffic levels had already rendered the project insufficient by the time it was completed. Airport officials therefore prepared for further expansion.

The deregulation of the airline industry in 1978 led to an increase in the number of carriers at McCarran and prompted officials to accelerate their expansion plans. In October 1985, a central terminal, Concourse C, and a people mover between the two buildings opened.

In the late 1980s and early 1990s, America West Airlines was the busiest airline at McCarran. The carrier began offering cheap night flights to Las Vegas in 1986. It ultimately developed a hub at the airport that functioned between 10 pm and 2 am every night. The strategy capitalized on the fact that Las Vegas was open 24 hours a day and enabled the airline to decrease costs. America West charged low fares because it was the only carrier operating such a large number of flights at that time of night. Most of its customers were tourists, while the remainder were changing planes. By the late 1990s, Southwest Airlines had overtaken America West as McCarran's largest carrier and occupied all the gates in Concourse C. According to contemporary reports, Southwest emphasized high-frequency service, low fares, and cooperative marketing with local resorts in the Las Vegas market.

Multiple projects were finished during the 1990s. The Charter/International Terminal, later renamed Terminal 2, opened in December 1991. A cargo center was dedicated two years later. In 1994, a tunnel beneath the east–west runways that linked the airport to the Las Vegas Beltway opened. A nine-level parking facility was completed in 1996, and in June 1998, the first two wings of Concourse D were inaugurated. McCarran also gained its first scheduled flights to Europe and Asia. In November 1996, Condor launched a route to Cologne, and Northwest Airlines commenced service to its hub at Tokyo's Narita Airport in June 1998. With the backing of two casinos, National Airlines set up a hub in Las Vegas the following year. The company specialized in low-fare flights to cities on the East Coast. Other casinos responded by arranging package deals with larger airlines. This and other factors led to National's demise in 2002.

=== Innovation and new terminal ===
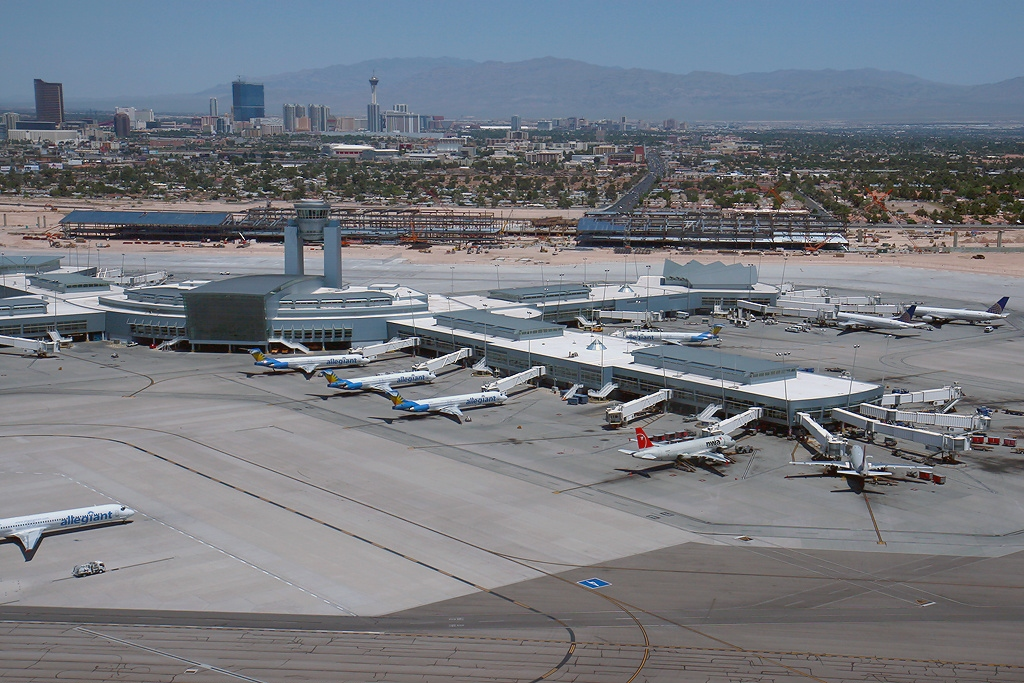
Concourse D in May 2009 with Terminal 3 under construction in the background

Officials started to introduce new technologies. In the late 1990s, they began following a common-use strategy, where airlines share airport facilities. The airport first deployed computer systems known as common-use terminal equipment (CUTE) at gates and check-in counters. McCarran pioneered the use of CUTE in the domestic terminals of American airports. In 2003, it became the first airport in the country to install common-use self-service kiosks, which customers use to check in and obtain their boarding passes. With nearly 30 carriers serving McCarran, officials did not want to have separate sets of kiosks for each one. The airport's use of common-use facilities has been cited in industry publications as an early example of the common-use approach in the United States. It began implementing a baggage-tracking system based on radio-frequency identification (RFID) in 2005. The technology was intended to facilitate luggage screening and decrease the chances of losing bags. McCarran and the Hong Kong airport were the first to use RFID on a large scale.

In the 2000s, Allegiant Air moved its headquarters from Fresno to Las Vegas. The company also changed its focus to providing nonstop flights between small towns and vacation destinations and expanded the number of cities it served from McCarran to 35. In 2004, Philippine Airlines extended its flight between Manila and Vancouver to Las Vegas. The service was primarily targeted at tourists from western Canada, though the carrier also hoped to attract members of the large Filipino community in Las Vegas. The third wing of Concourse D, along with a ramp control tower, opened in April 2005. Two years later, a consolidated rental car facility began operations. The fourth and final wing of Concourse D was added in September 2008. In the same month, US Airways closed the night hub due to the 2000s energy crisis. The airline had merged with America West in 2005. US Airways shut its crew base at McCarran in 2010. By 2012, the company had eliminated all routes except for those to its hubs in Charlotte, Philadelphia, and Phoenix and its focus city at Reagan National Airport in Washington, D.C.

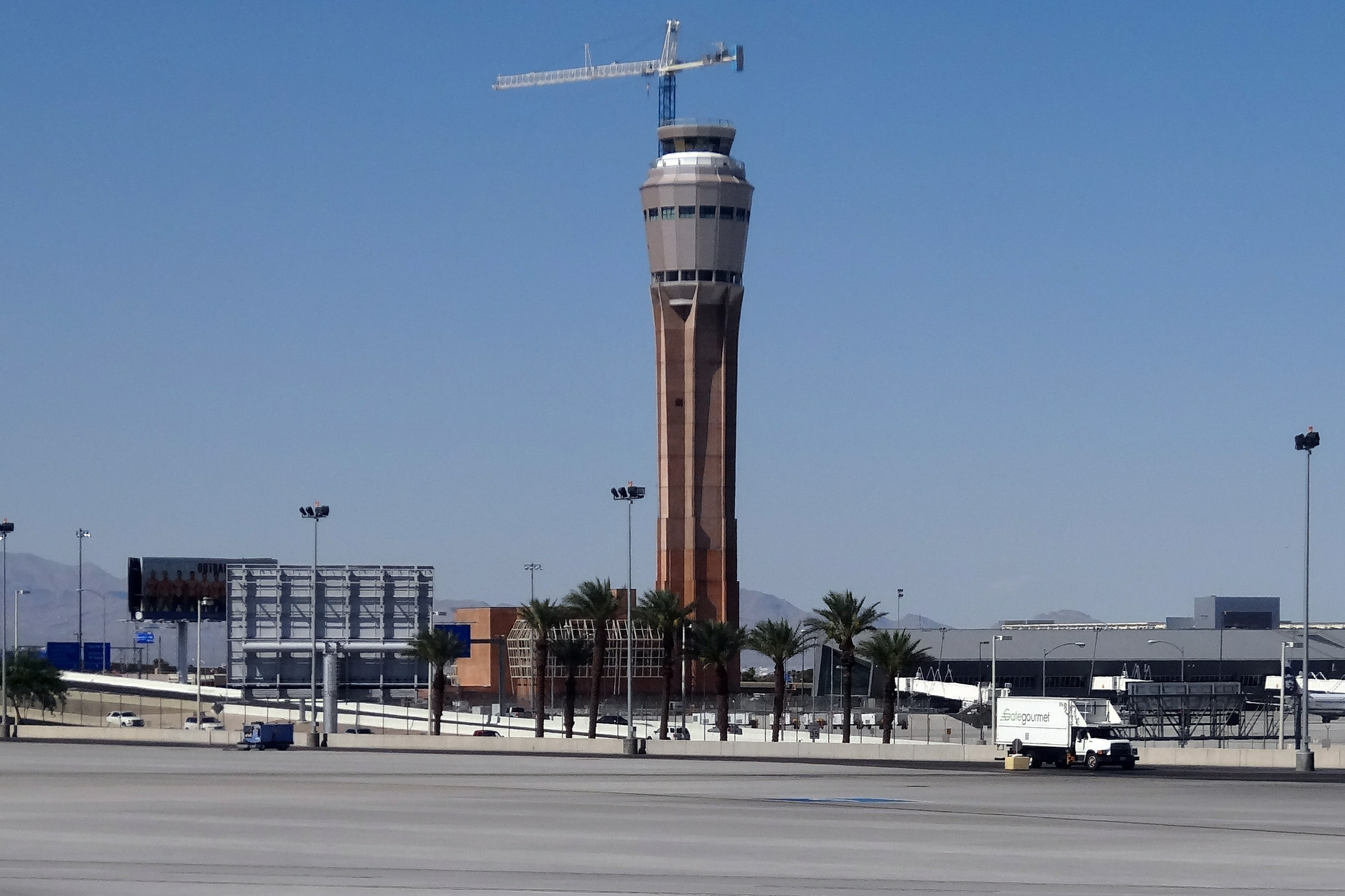
New tower under construction, July 2013

Fearing McCarran would soon exceed its capacity, the Clark County Commission began work on Terminal 3 in 2005. The economy was doing well, and Terminal 2 had become congested. Although the economy later entered a recession, the county chose to proceed with the project. The airport's cargo facility was located within the Terminal 3 site, so it was replaced by the Marnell Air Cargo Center, which opened in 2010. The new terminal was inaugurated in June 2012, replacing Terminal 2. It cost $2.4 billion and was the largest public works project in Nevada. In 2013, Philippine Airlines discontinued its route to Las Vegas. In 2016, Terminal 2 was demolished, and a new control tower and Terminal Radar Approach Control facility were completed. At 352 feet (107 m) tall, it was the second tallest in the country when completed. In 2017, the airport equipped seven gates in Concourse D to receive international flights and built a tunnel to connect them to the customs facility in Terminal 3. LATAM Airlines Brasil added a seasonal route to São Paulo, McCarran's first direct link to South America, in June 2018.

At the onset of the COVID-19 pandemic in March 2020, the control tower was closed for several days after a controller tested positive for the virus, leading to many delays and cancellations. The following month, the decrease in traffic caused by the pandemic prompted the closure of all the gates in Concourse B and Terminal 3. Concourse B reopened in the summer, and the E gates in Terminal 3 subsequently reopened in July 2021.

In February 2021, the Clark County Commission voted unanimously to rename the airport after U.S. senator Harry Reid of Nevada. The commissioners believed that Pat McCarran had left a legacy of anti-Semitism and racism. The airport was officially renamed in December 2021.

== Facilities ==
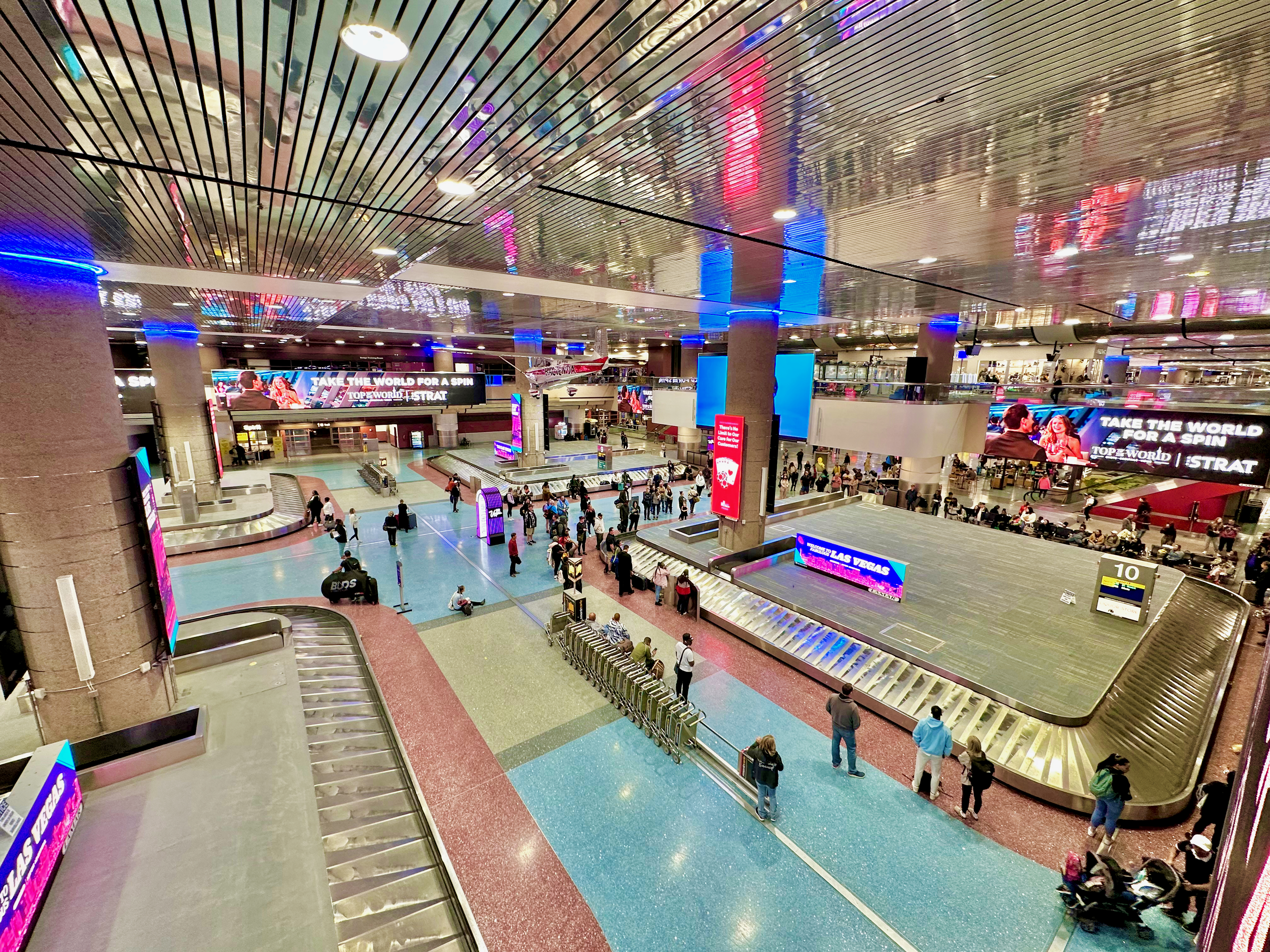
Baggage claim carousels in Terminal 1

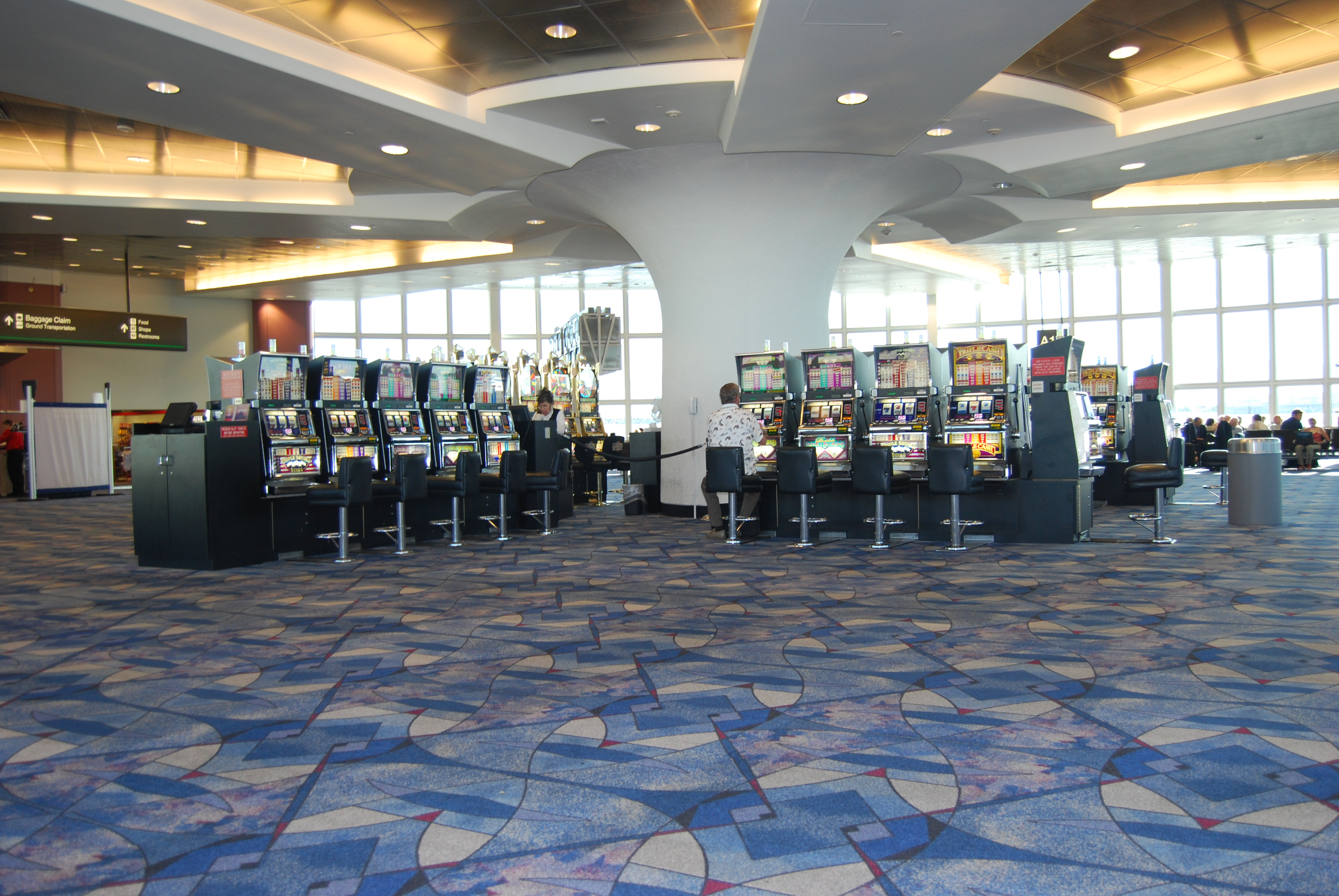
Slot machines in Concourse A

Harry Reid International Airport has four runways:

- 1L/19R: 9,770 by 150 feet (2,978 m × 46 m)
- 1R/19L: 9,769 by 150 feet (2,978 m × 46 m)
- 8L/26R: 14,835 by 150 feet (4,522 m × 46 m)
- 8R/26L: 10,526 by 150 feet (3,208 m × 46 m)

The runways are made of concrete. 1L, 26R, and 26L have a category I instrument landing system with distance measuring equipment. 8L/26R is the second-longest civil runway in the country, after 16R/34L at Denver International Airport.

The airport has a total of 110 gates across two passenger terminals, which are numbered 1 and 3, and a satellite concourse called Concourse D. Terminal 1 contains three concourses labeled A, B, and C. Terminal 3 houses the E gates and handles international arrivals. Terminal 3 and Concourse D are able to receive international flights, and a tunnel links the international gates in Concourse D to the customs checkpoint. Of these international gates, Concourse D has a 3-jetway stand (D21/22) that can accommodate an Airbus A380. There is an airside tram system with three lines. The green and blue lines connect the central part of Terminal 1 with Concourses C and D, respectively. The red line runs between Terminal 3 and Concourse D.

The airport's terminal gaming dates back to 1968. Under Nevada gaming laws, slot machines are permitted in the passenger terminals. The Las Vegas and Reno airports are the only two airports in the United States with slot machines. Terminal 1 and Concourse D also house exhibits of the Howard W. Cannon Aviation Museum, which covers the history of aviation in southern Nevada.

Airlines unload their freight at the Marnell Air Cargo Center, which can handle 100,000 short tons (91,000 t) of cargo. Janet Air flights to secret military installations operate from a dedicated terminal building. The airport includes a public parking area commonly used as an informal viewing point for aircraft takeoffs and landings.

Maverick Helicopters and Papillon Grand Canyon Helicopters each operate their own terminal at Harry Reid Airport for sightseeing flights. The Maverick terminal covers 6,000 square feet (560 m^{2}), and the Sundance terminal occupies 13,000 square feet (1,200 m^{2}). The Papillon terminal was established in 1997.

== Airlines and destinations ==
=== Passenger ===
Airlines	Destinations	Refs
Aer Lingus	Seasonal: Dublin (ends December 3, 2026)	
Aero	Charter: Los Angeles–Van Nuys	
Aeroméxico	Mexico City–Benito Juárez; Seasonal: Guadalajara, Monterrey	
Air Canada	Montréal–Trudeau, Toronto–Pearson, Vancouver	
Air Canada Rouge	Toronto–Pearson; Seasonal: Montréal–Trudeau	
Air France	Seasonal: Paris–Charles de Gaulle	
Alaska Airlines	Anchorage, Boise, Everett, Portland (OR), San Diego, San Francisco, Santa Rosa, Seattle/Tacoma	
Allegiant Air	Appleton, Asheville, Belleville/St. Louis, Bellingham, Billings, Bismarck, Bozeman, Cedar Rapids/Iowa City, Chicago/Rockford, Cincinnati, Des Moines, Destin/Fort Walton Beach, Eugene, Fargo, Fayetteville/Bentonville, Flint, Fort Wayne, Fresno, Glacier Park/Kalispell, Grand Forks, Grand Island, Grand Rapids, Great Falls, Idaho Falls, Indianapolis, Knoxville, Laredo, Lexington, McAllen, Medford, Memphis, Minot, Missoula, Moline/Quad Cities, Monterey, Omaha, Peoria, Phoenix/Mesa, Rapid City, Sacramento, Santa Maria (CA), Shreveport, Sioux Falls, South Bend, Spokane, Springfield/Branson, Stockton, Tri-Cities (WA), Tulsa, Wichita	
American Airlines	Charlotte, Chicago–O'Hare, Dallas/Fort Worth, Los Angeles, Miami, New York–JFK, Philadelphia, Phoenix–Sky Harbor, Washington–National	
Avelo Airlines	Dallas/McKinney	
Avianca El Salvador	Seasonal: San Salvador	
Breeze Airways	Akron/Canton, Eureka, Fort Myers, Grand Junction, Gulfport/Biloxi, Hartford, Huntsville, Jacksonville (FL), Lincoln, New Orleans, Norfolk, Orange County, Provo, Raleigh/Durham (resumes June 30, 2027), Redmond/Bend, Richmond, Syracuse, Tampa (begins January 5, 2027), Twin Falls	
British Airways	London–Heathrow	
Condor	Seasonal: Frankfurt	
Contour Airlines	Merced, Page	
Copa Airlines	Panama City–Tocumen	
Delta Air Lines	Atlanta, Austin, Boston, Cincinnati, Detroit, Los Angeles, Minneapolis/St. Paul, New York–JFK, Raleigh/Durham, Salt Lake City, Seattle/Tacoma	
Discover Airlines	Frankfurt	
Flair Airlines	Seasonal: Vancouver	
Frontier Airlines	Atlanta, Austin, Boise, Chicago–O'Hare, Cleveland, Dallas/Fort Worth, Denver, Detroit, El Paso, Houston–Intercontinental, Kansas City, Los Angeles, Minneapolis/St Paul, Nashville, Oakland, Oklahoma City, Ontario (CA), Orange County, Orlando, Phoenix–Sky Harbor, Portland (OR), Reno/Tahoe, Sacramento, St. Louis, Salt Lake City, San Antonio, San Diego, San Francisco, San Jose (CA), Seattle/Tacoma, Washington–Dulles; Seasonal: Philadelphia	
Hawaiian Airlines	Honolulu, Kahului	
JetBlue	Boston, Fort Lauderdale, New York–JFK, Orlando	
JSX	Burbank, Dallas–Love, Denver–Centennial, Los Angeles, Oakland, San Diego/Carlsbad, Santa Monica, Scottsdale; Seasonal: Concord (CA), Reno/Tahoe, Orange County, Salt Lake City	
KLM	Amsterdam	
Korean Air	Seoul–Incheon	
Porter Airlines	Toronto–Pearson; Seasonal: Edmonton	
Qantas	Seasonal: Sydney–Kingsford Smith (begins December 29, 2026)	
Southwest Airlines	Albuquerque, Amarillo, Atlanta, Austin, Baltimore, Birmingham (AL), Boise, Boston (begins March 11, 2027), Bozeman, Buffalo, Burbank, Cancún, Chicago–Midway, Cleveland, Colorado Springs, Columbus–Glenn, Dallas–Love, Denver, Des Moines, Detroit, El Paso, Eugene, Fresno, Hilo, Honolulu, Houston–Hobby, Indianapolis, Kahului, Kailua-Kona, Kansas City, Lihue, Little Rock, Long Beach, Los Angeles, Louisville, Lubbock, Memphis, Miami (begins March 11, 2027), Midland/Odessa, Milwaukee, Nashville, New Orleans, Oakland, Oklahoma City, Omaha, Ontario (CA), Orange County, Orlando, Palm Springs, Philadelphia (begins March 11, 2027), Phoenix–Sky Harbor, Pittsburgh, Portland (OR), Puerto Vallarta, Raleigh/Durham, Reno/Tahoe, Sacramento, St. Louis, Salt Lake City, San Antonio, San Diego, San Francisco, San Jose (CA), San José del Cabo, Santa Barbara, Santa Rosa, Seattle/Tacoma, Spokane, Tampa, Tucson, Tulsa, Washington–National, Wichita; Seasonal: Albany, Anchorage, Fort Lauderdale, Grand Rapids, Knoxville (begins March 13, 2027)	
Sun Country Airlines	Minneapolis/St. Paul; Seasonal: Eau Claire, Milwaukee, Williston	
United Airlines	Chicago–O'Hare, Cleveland, Denver, Houston–Intercontinental, Los Angeles, Newark, San Francisco, Washington–Dulles	
Virgin Atlantic	London–Heathrow; Seasonal: Manchester (UK)	
Viva	Guadalajara, Mexico City–Benito Juárez, Monterrey	
Volaris	Guadalajara, Mexico City–Benito Juárez, Querétaro (begins December 4, 2026)	
WestJet	Calgary, Edmonton, Vancouver; Seasonal: Winnipeg	

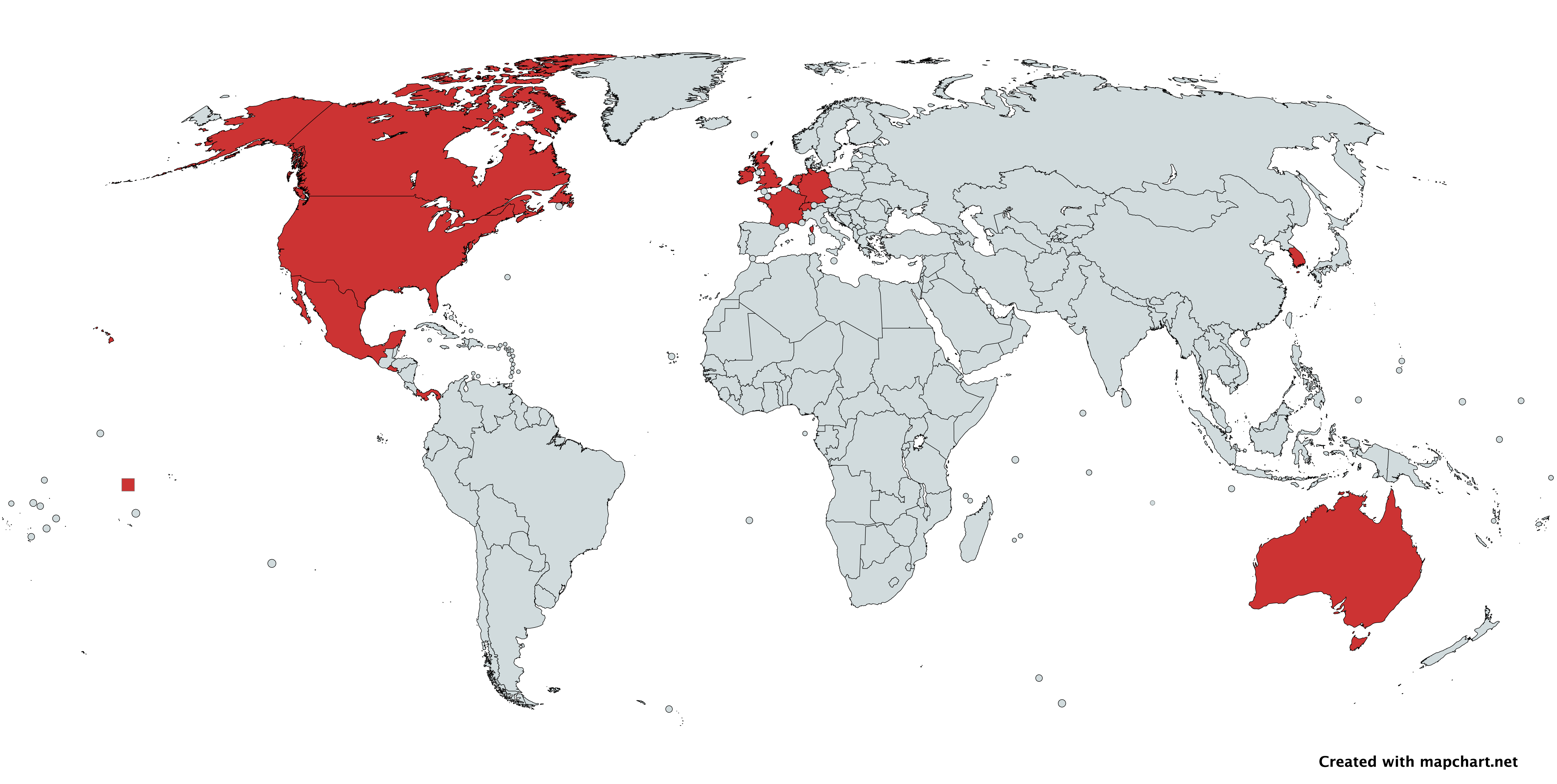
Harry Reid International Airport passenger destinations

=== Cargo ===
Airlines	Destinations	Refs
Ameriflight	Phoenix–Sky Harbor	
FedEx Express	Memphis, Oakland	
UPS Airlines	Louisville	

== Statistics ==
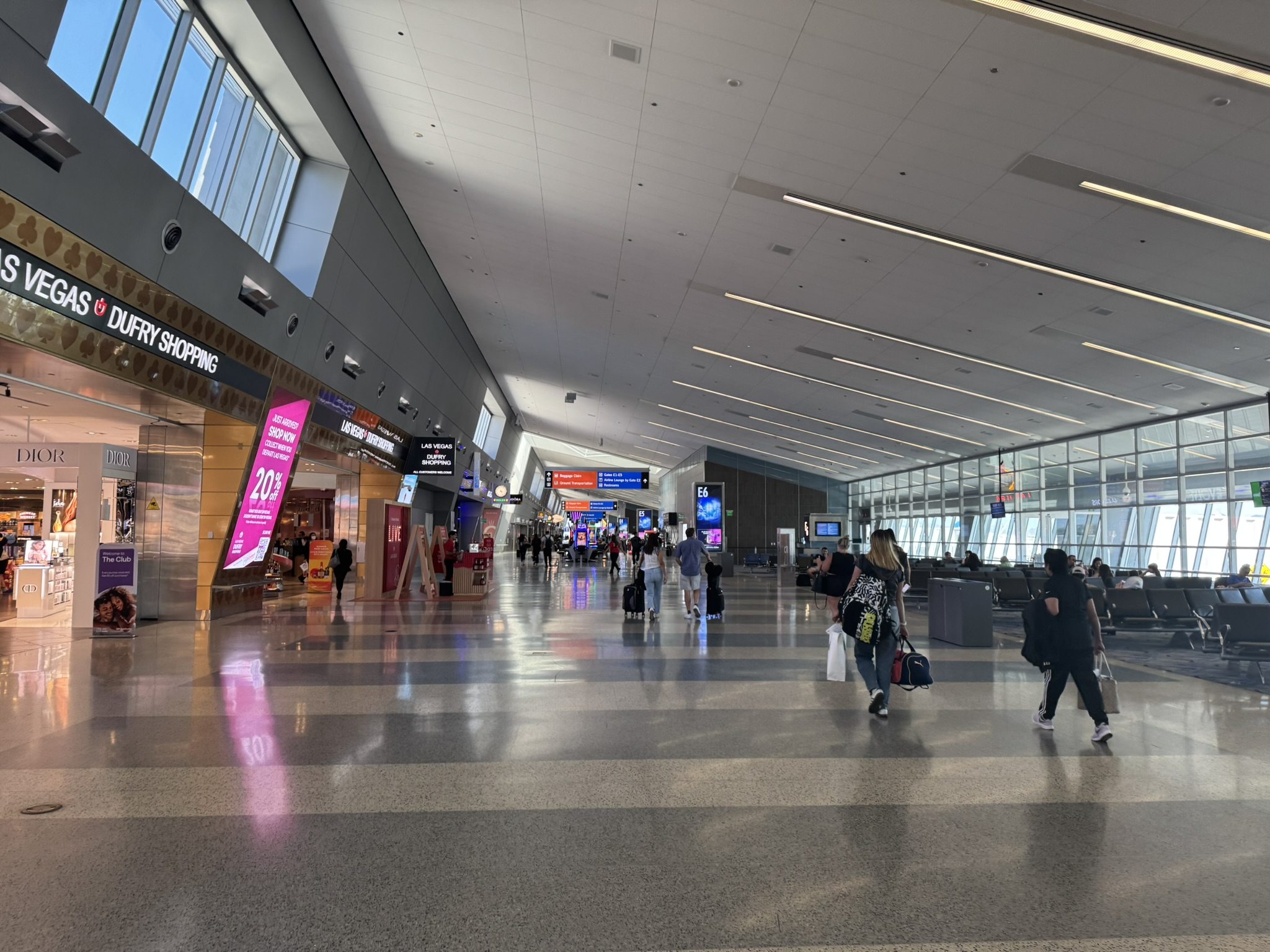
Gates at Terminal 3

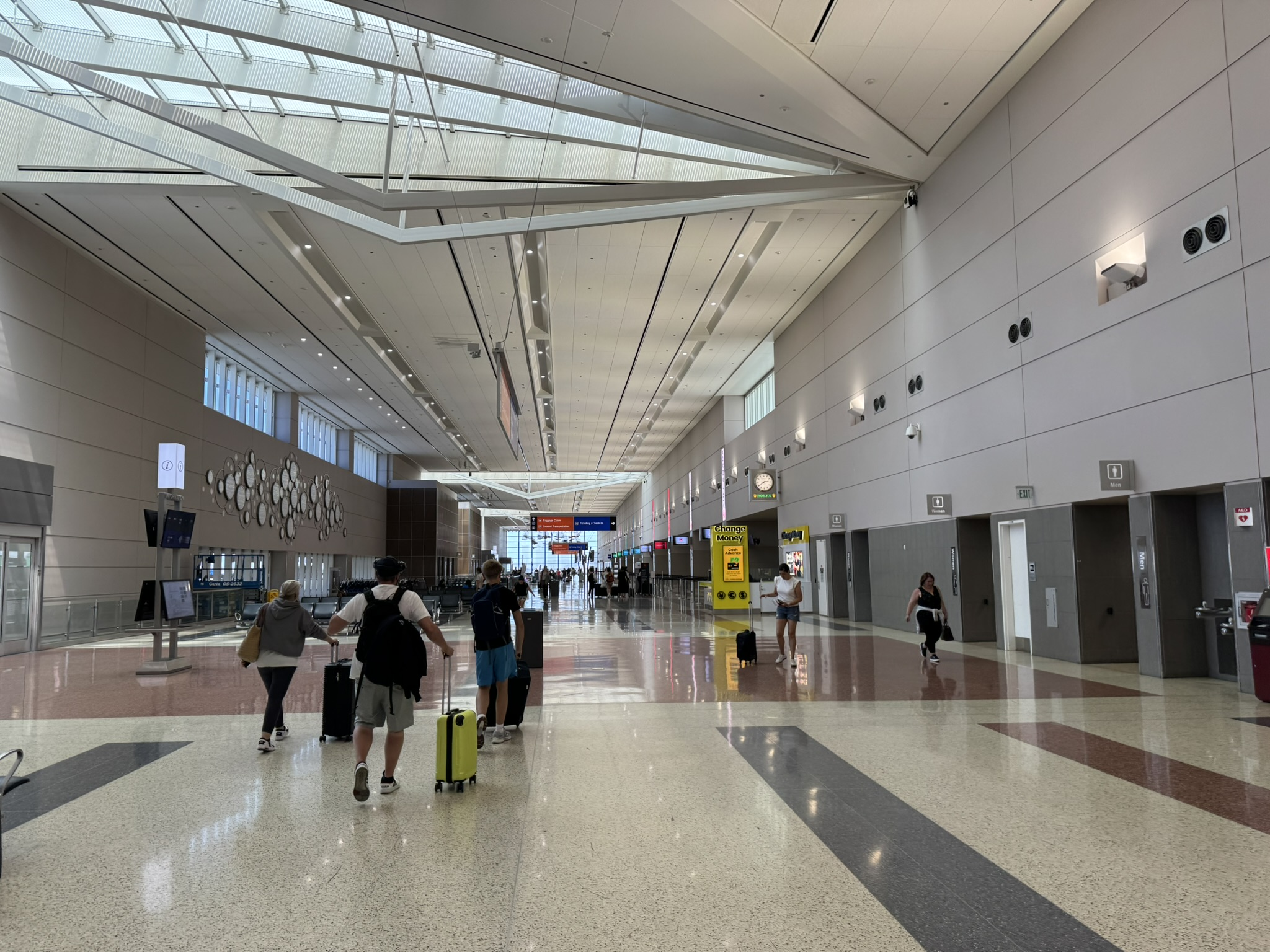
Main corridor at Terminal 3

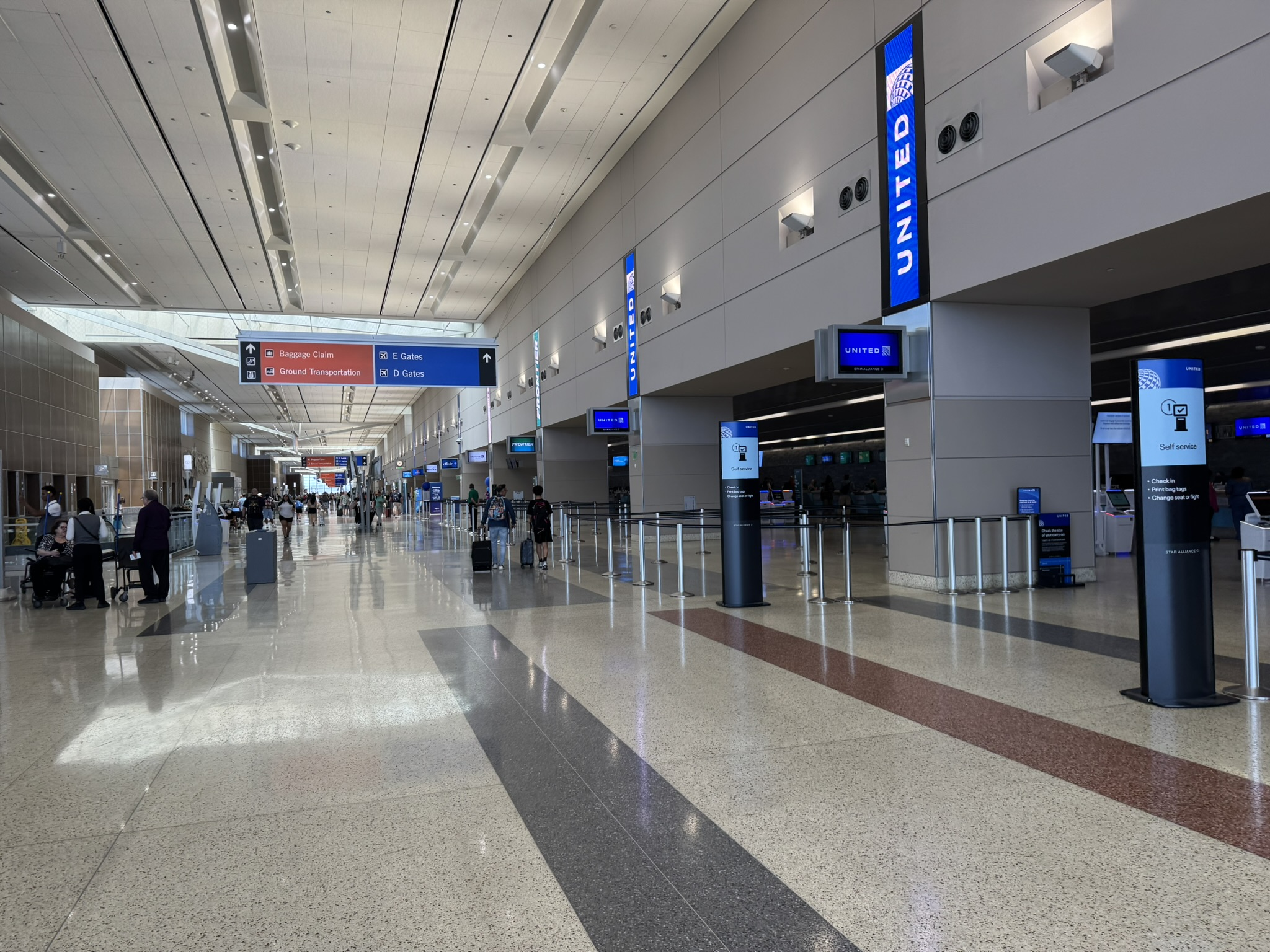
Check-in counters at Terminal 3

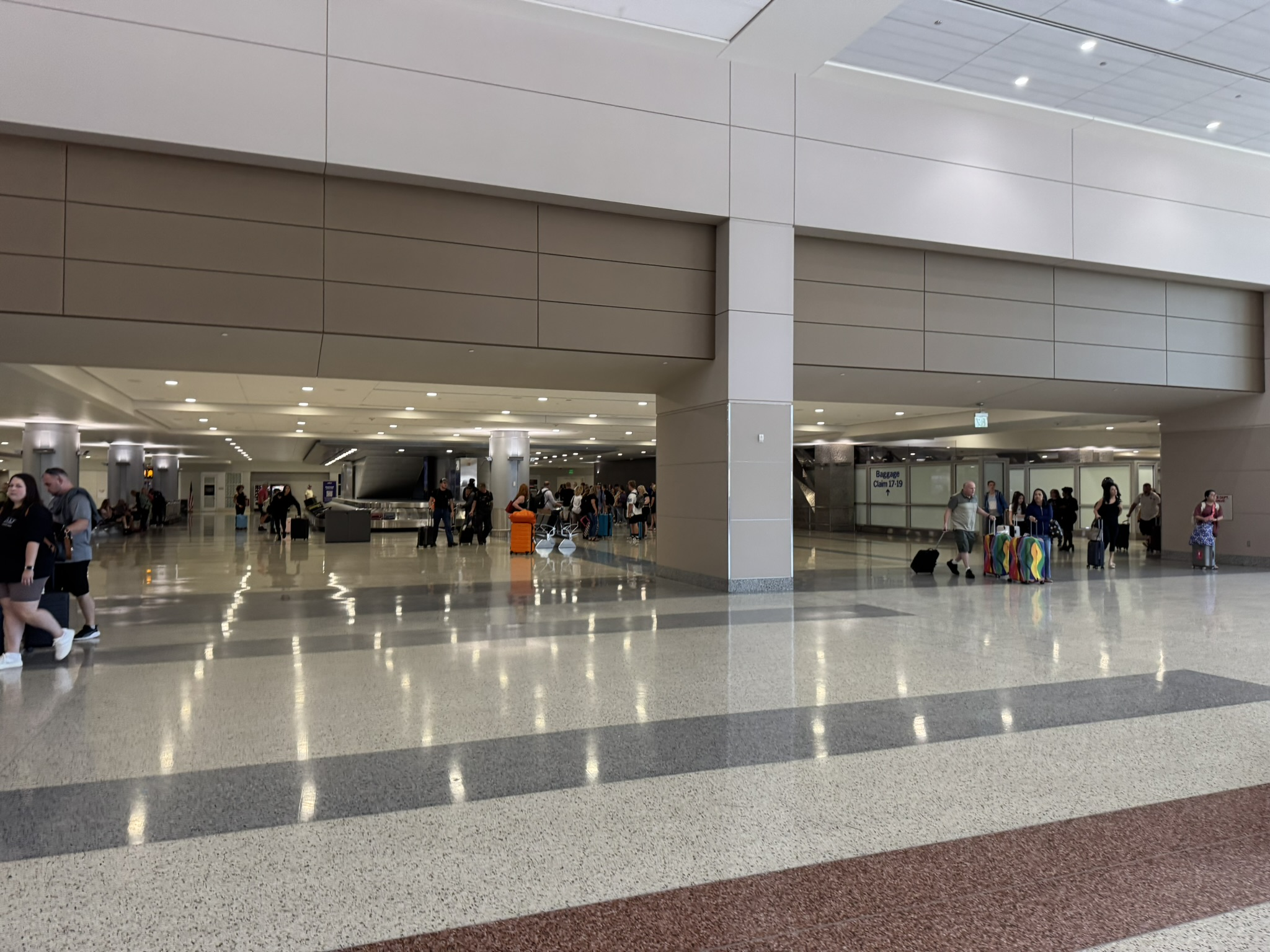
Domestic arrivals area at Terminal 3

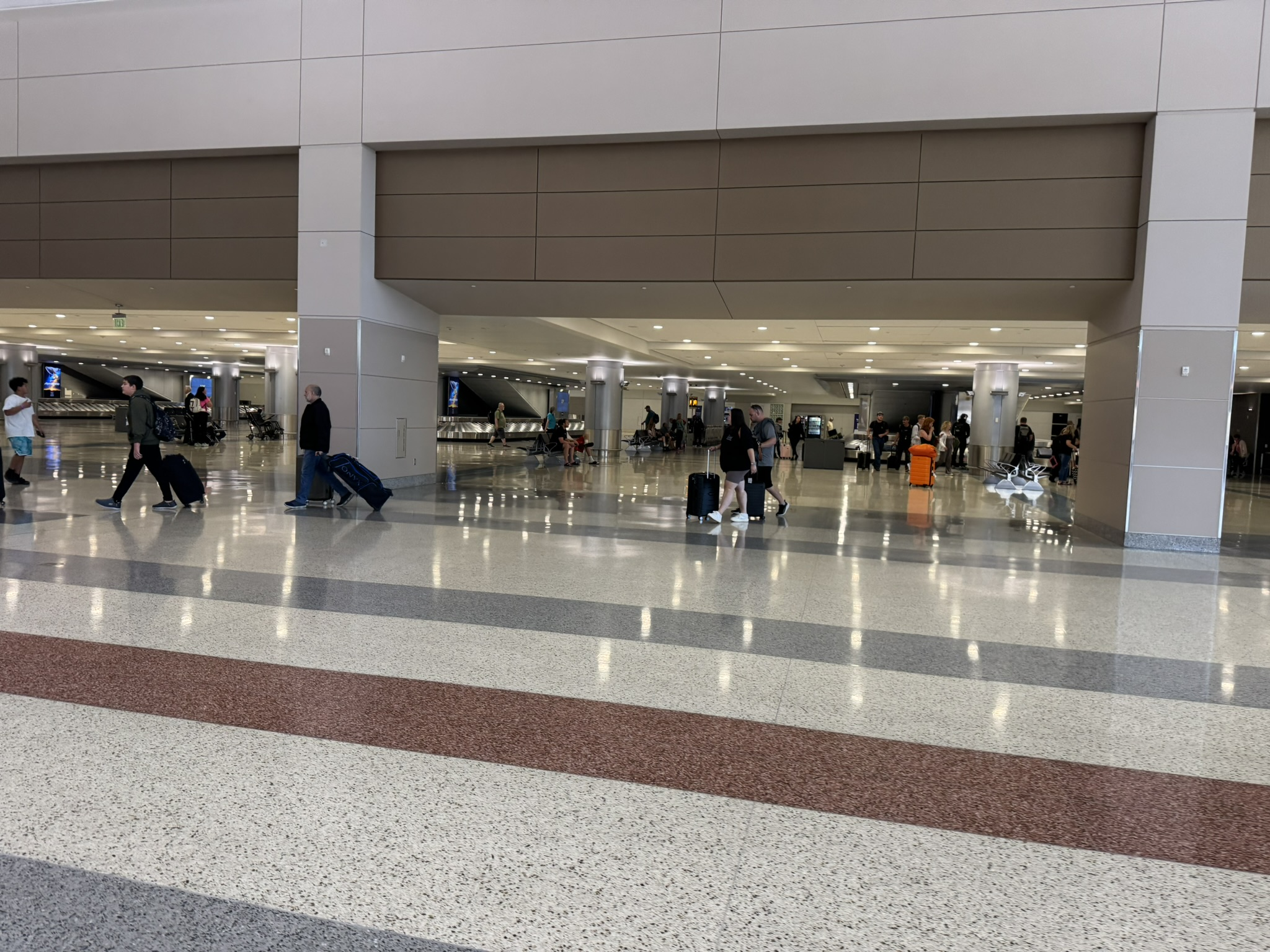
Domestic arrivals area at Terminal 3

In 2024, a record 58,447,782 travelers passed through Reid Airport. The airport also had 613,973 aircraft movements and handled 252,898,593 pounds of cargo.

=== Top destinations ===
Busiest domestic routes from LAS (September 2025 – August 2026)
Rank	City	Passengers	Carriers
1	Los Angeles, California	1,087,853	American, Delta, Frontier, Southwest, Spirit, United
2	Denver, Colorado	1,004,990	Frontier, Southwest, United
3	San Francisco, California	851,960	Alaska, Frontier, Southwest, United
4	Atlanta, Georgia	812,839	Delta, Frontier, Southwest, Spirit
5	Dallas/Fort Worth, Texas	803,366	American, Frontier, Spirit
6	Seattle/Tacoma, Washington	794,993	Alaska, Delta, Frontier, Southwest, Spirit
7	Chicago–O'Hare, Illinois	780,248	American, Frontier, Southwest, Spirit, United
8	Phoenix–Sky Harbor, Arizona	733,741	American, Frontier, Southwest
9	San Diego, California	633,938	Alaska, Delta, Frontier, Southwest, Spirit
10	New York–JFK, New York	548,454	American, Delta, Frontier, JetBlue

Busiest international routes from LAS (September 2025 – August 2026)
Rank	City	Passengers	Carriers
1	London–Heathrow, United Kingdom	440,116	British Airways, Virgin Atlantic
2	Mexico City–Benito Juárez, Mexico	379,625	Aeroméxico, Viva, Volaris
3	Toronto–Pearson, Canada	368,324	Air Canada, Air Canada Rouge, Porter, WestJet
4	Guadalajara, Mexico	314,718	Viva, Volaris
5	Vancouver, Canada	288,044	Air Canada, Flair, WestJet
6	Calgary, Canada	251,857	WestJet
7	Seoul–Incheon, South Korea	179,739	Korean Air
8	Monterrey, Mexico	154,042	Aeroméxico, Viva
9	Amsterdam, Netherlands	137,112	KLM
10	Montréal–Trudeau, Canada	103,551	Air Canada, Air Canada Rouge

=== Airline market share ===
Largest airlines at LAS (September 2025 – August 2026)
Rank	Airline	Passengers	Share
1	Southwest Airlines	21,393,666	42.3%
2	Delta Air Lines	4,964,977	9.8%
3	United Airlines	4,356,628	8.6%
4	American Airlines	4,290,350	8.5%
5	Frontier Airlines	4,222,527	8.3%
	Other	11,400,000	22.5%

=== Annual traffic ===
LAS Airport historical passenger traffic 1970–present
Year	Passengers	Year	Passengers	Year	Passengers	Year	Passengers
1970	4,086,973	1985	10,924,047	2000	36,865,866	2015	45,318,788
1971	4,102,285	1986	12,428,748	2001	35,179,960	2016	47,368,219
1972	4,608,764	1987	15,582,302	2002	35,009,011	2017	48,430,118
1973	5,397,017	1988	16,231,199	2003	36,265,932	2018	49,646,118
1974	5,944,433	1989	17,106,948	2004	41,441,531	2019	51,528,524
1975	6,500,806	1990	19,089,684	2005	44,267,370	2020	22,200,595
1976	7,685,817	1991	20,171,969	2006	46,304,376	2021	39,710,493
1977	7,964,687	1992	20,912,585	2007	47,729,527	2022	52,668,109‡
1978	9,110,842	1993	22,492,156	2008	44,074,642	2023	57,644,113‡
1979	10,574,127	1994	26,850,486	2009	40,469,012	2024	58,447,782
1980	10,302,106	1995	28,027,239	2010	39,757,359	2025	54,989,185
1981	9,469,727	1996	30,459,965	2011	41,481,204	2026	
1982	9,438,648	1997	30,315,094	2012	41,667,596	2027	
1983	10,312,842	1998	30,227,287	2013	41,857,059	2028	
1984	10,141,809	1999	33,715,129	2014	42,885,350	2029	

‡ = Revised data

- From 1970 to the end of 2025, 1,593,383,560 passengers (enplaned+deplaned) have passed through Harry Reid Int'l Airport, an annual average of 28,453,278 passengers per year.

== Ground transportation ==
Vehicles reach the airport via Paradise Road and Russell Road from the north and via the Harry Reid Airport Connector, which branches off from the Las Vegas Beltway, from the south. A 5,000-space consolidated rental car facility is located three miles (5 km) away and is linked to the terminals by shuttle buses. Shuttle service exists between Terminals 1 and 3. The Regional Transportation Commission of Southern Nevada's public bus system serves the airport on Level 0.

== Accidents and incidents ==
- On November 15, 1956, Trans World Airlines Flight 163, a Martin 4-0-4, crash-landed at then McCarran Field during an attempted single-engine go-around after takeoff returning to the airport. Out of 38 passengers and crew, 16 received minor injuries. There was no fire, but the aircraft was destroyed.
- On the evening of November 15, 1964, Bonanza Air Lines Flight 114, a Fairchild F-27 turboprop flying from Phoenix Sky Harbor International Airport to McCarran International Airport, crashed into the top of a hill in desert country about eight miles (13 km) SSW of Las Vegas in poor weather conditions, all 26 passengers and three crew died. The probable cause was the misreading of a faulty, outdated approach chart by the captain which resulted in a premature descent before impacting terrain.
- On April 16, 1965, a Bonanza Air Lines Fairchild F-27 on a training flight, cartwheeled off the runway at LAS because of an asymmetrical flap condition on takeoff. Both occupants survived, but the aircraft was substantially damaged and was written off.
- On December 9, 1968, a Lockheed L-1649 Starliner operated by Fly By Night Safaris crashed back onto the runway at LAS during takeoff when a partial loss of power forced the pilot to carry out a belly landing. Parts of the propellers broke off as they contacted the runway, puncturing the fuselage. There were no fatalities among the 104 passengers and crew on board, but the aircraft was destroyed.
- On October 24, 1978, a Learjet 24 operated by Qualitron Aero Services Inc. crashed at LAS because of a premature rotation when one engine was cut after V1 speed after takeoff. Both occupants survived, but the aircraft was substantially damaged and written off.
- On August 17, 1999, a British Aerospace 125 operated by DP Air was severely damaged after it was forced to land at LAS with the landing gear retracted because of a loss of its hydraulic systems to extend the gear. All eight occupants survived with no injuries, but the aircraft was destroyed.
- On September 8, 2015, British Airways Flight 2276, a Boeing 777-200 destined for Gatwick Airport, suffered an uncontained left engine failure during the takeoff roll because of a cracked compressor disk, and the pilots aborted takeoff. A fire broke out in the affected engine after the aircraft stopped, and an evacuation of all 170 passengers and crew was performed on the runway. There was one serious injury and 19 minor injuries during the evacuation. The aircraft was severely damaged by the engine fire, but the plane was repaired and later placed back into service.
- On October 5, 2024, a Frontier Airlines Airbus A321 operating as Flight 1326 from San Diego, caught fire while landing. The pilots declared an emergency and the flight landed without injuries to its 197 occupants.

== In popular culture ==
Harry Reid International Airport – under its former name, McCarran International Airport – appears in the 2010 video game Fallout: New Vegas. In game, it is often referred to as Camp McCarran, due to the presence of New California Republic troops using it as a military base.

The airport appears at the end of the 1988 film Midnight Run, and the end of the 2007 film Ocean's Thirteen.

== See also ==
- Henderson Executive Airport
- List of airports in Nevada
- North Las Vegas Airport
- Southern Nevada Supplemental Airport
- List of airports in Nevada
- Transportation in Las Vegas
