= Austin Executive Airport =

Airport in Travis County, Texas, United States of America

Coordinates: 30.3999°N 97.5735°W

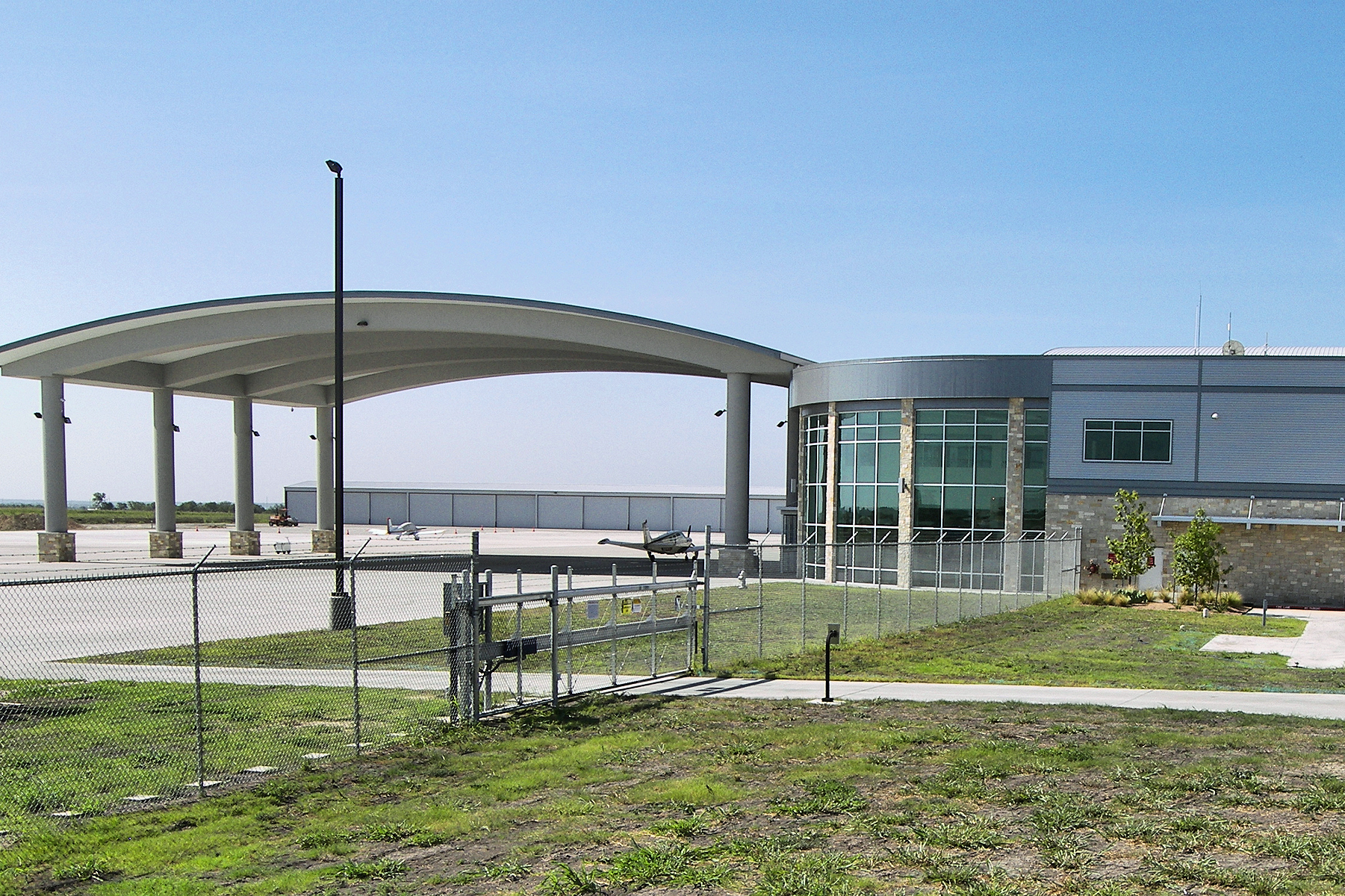
- IATA: none; ICAO: KEDC; FAA LID: EDC

Summary
- Airport type: Public
- Owner: Travis County Field LLC
- Serves: Austin, Texas
- Location: Pflugerville, Texas
- Opened: 2011; 15 years ago
- Elevation AMSL: 620 ft (190 m)
- Website: www.austinexecutiveairport.com

Map
- Location within Texas

Runways
Direction	Length		Surface
Direction	ft	m	Surface
13/31	6,025	1,836	Asphalt
16/34	1,550	472	Asphalt

Statistics (2008)
- Aircraft operations: 2,700
- Based aircraft: 9
- Source: Federal Aviation Administration

Austin Executive Airport (ICAO: KEDC, FAA LID: EDC) is a public-use airport in Travis County, 14 miles northeast of Austin, immediately southeast of Pflugerville and north of Manor. It was known as Bird's Nest Airport (FAA: 6R4) until 2011.

Although many U.S. airports use the same three-letter location identifier for the FAA and IATA, Austin Executive Airport is assigned EDC to the FAA but has no designation from the IATA.

== History ==
Austin Executive Airport opened in 2011 with funding from Ron Henriksen, who also operates Houston Executive Airport. It incorporates the former Bird's Nest Airport, which operated for about 40 years on 134 acres (0.54 km^{2}), and adjacent property purchased for the expansion. A new 6,025-foot (1,836 m) runway was built and the original runway was shortened from 2,700 feet (820 m) to 1,550 feet (470 m). In February 2013, the new Runway 13/31 was awarded the 2012 Ray Brown Airport Pavement Award by the National Asphalt Pavement Association, recognizing it as the highest quality airport asphalt pavement project in the country.

A different airport with a similar name was the Austin Executive Airpark (FAA: 3R3), near Parmer Lane and Interstate 35. Named Tim's Airpark in the 1960s and 1970s, it closed on May 1, 1999.

== Facilities ==
Austin Executive Airport covers 585 acres (237 ha) at an elevation of 620 feet (189 m). It has two asphalt runways: 13/31 is 6,025 by 100 feet (1,836 x 30 m) and 16/34 is 1,550 by 25 feet (472 x 8 m).

In 2013 the airport had 18,000 general aviation aircraft operations, average 1,500 per month. 93 aircraft were then based at this airport.

== Airlines and destinations ==
Airlines	Destinations	Refs
JSX	Seasonal: Taos	

== See also ==
- List of airports in Texas
