= McClellan–Palomar Airport =

Municipal airport serving Carlsbad, California, United States

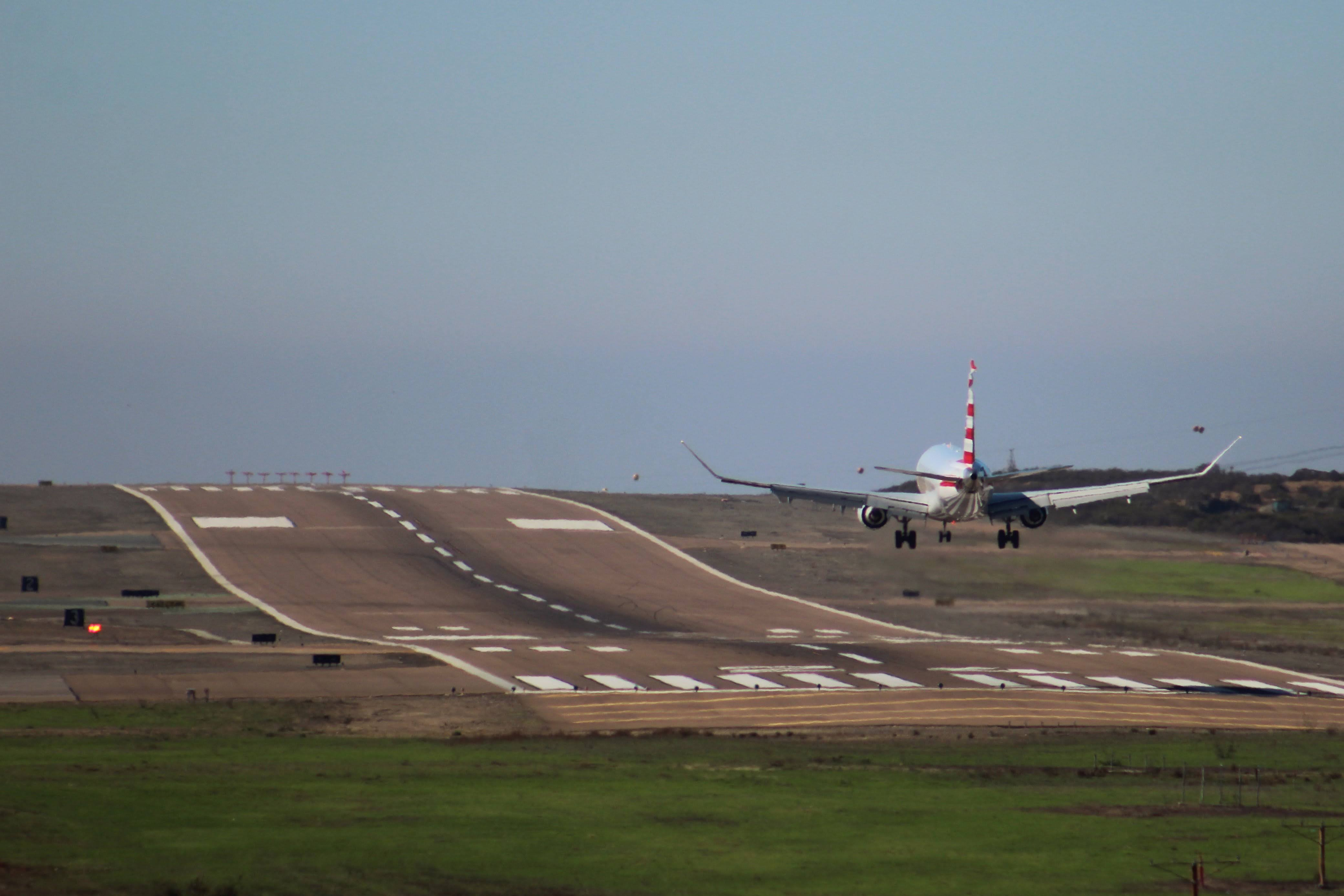
- An Embraer 175 operated by Envoy Air landing on Runway 24
- IATA: CLD; ICAO: KCRQ; FAA LID: CRQ

Summary
- Airport type: Public
- Owner/Operator: County of San Diego
- Serves: Northern San Diego County
- Location: 2100 Palomar Airport Road; Carlsbad, California
- Elevation AMSL: 331 ft (101 m)
- Coordinates: 33°07′42″N 117°16′48″W
- Website: Official website

Maps
- FAA airport diagram
- Location of airport in California CLD (the United States)

Runways
Direction	Length		Surface
Direction	ft	m	Surface
6/24	4,897	1,493	Asphalt

Helipads
Number	Length		Surface
Number	ft	m	Surface
H1	50	15	Asphalt

Statistics (2024)
- Aircraft operations: 171,256
- Total Passengers: 3,743
- Sources: FAA, airport website

McClellan–Palomar Airport (IATA: CLD, ICAO: KCRQ, FAA LID: CRQ) is a county-owned public airport located 3 miles (4.8 km; 2.6 nmi) southeast of downtown Carlsbad in San Diego County, California. The airport opened in 1959, replacing Del Mar Municipal Airport. It supports both general aviation and limited commercial service. As of March 2013, it was the fourth-busiest single-runway airport in the United States.

The airport is located approximately 4 miles (6.4 km; 3.5 nmi) from Legoland California. The airport was the location of a landfill from 1962-1975. The City of Carlsbad has expanded to now include the area around the airport.

The airport is named for Gerald McClellan, an aviator and civic leader in San Diego's North County area. Most U.S. airports' three-letter FAA and IATA location identifiers are identical; however, McClellan–Palomar Airport's FAA identifier is CRQ while its IATA is CLD. The airport is part of the name of the TV production company Lorimar Television.

== Facilities ==
McClellan–Palomar Airport covers 466 acres (189 ha) and has one asphalt runway, 6/24, 4,897 feet (1,493 m) long and 150 feet (46 m) wide. The airport also has one asphalt helipad that is 40 by 50 feet (12 m × 15 m).

In the year ending December 31, 2021, the airport had 140,451 aircraft operations, an average of 385 per day: 93% general aviation, 6% air taxi, <1% scheduled commercial, and <1% military. 284 aircraft were then based at this airport: 164 single-engine, 79 jet, 26 multi-engine, 14 helicopter, and 1 glider.

== Airlines and destinations ==
Airlines	Destinations	Refs
Advanced Air	Imperial/El Centro; Seasonal: Mammoth Lakes	
American Eagle	Phoenix–Sky Harbor	
JSX	Las Vegas, Oakland, Scottsdale; Seasonal: Reno/Tahoe Taos	
United Express	Denver, San Francisco	

Destinations map
Destinations from McClellan-Palomar Airport
Red = Year-round destination
Green = Seasonal destination
Blue = Future destination

== Statistics ==
=== Top destinations ===
Busiest domestic routes from CLD (September 2025 – August 2026)
Rank	Airport	Passengers	Airline
1	Phoenix, Arizona	52,450	American
2	Denver, Colorado	14,730	United
3	San Francisco, California	11,520	United
4	Mammoth Lakes, California	1,760	Advanced

Note: JSX flights are not included in this data as they do not use the passenger terminal.

=== Airline Market Share ===
Largest airlines at CLD (September 2025 – August 2026)
Rank	Airline	Passengers	Share
1	Envoy Air	105,000	65.43%
2	Skywest Airlines	51,670	32.11%
3	Advanced Air	3,950	2.46%

== Airline service ==
Earlier airline service included American Eagle (operated by Wings West Airlines) and United Express (operated by WestAir Airlines), both serving Los Angeles (LAX), as well as America West Express (later US Airways Express) to Phoenix–Sky Harbor. In 1977, Scenic Airlines operated Fairchild Swearingen Metroliner flights to Palm Springs, with through service to Las Vegas and Phoenix. During the mid-1990s, American Eagle and United Express operated multiple daily flights to LAX using British Aerospace BAe Jetstream 31 aircraft. By 1999, Mesa Airlines operated America West Express service to Phoenix using de Havilland Canada DHC-8 Dash 8 turboprops.

Other airlines serving the airport in earlier decades included Golden West Airlines in the 1970s and Imperial Airlines and Air Resorts in the 1980s. These operations primarily used turboprop or propeller-driven aircraft.

The airport opened a new passenger terminal on January 29, 2009, following a 13-month, US$24 million (equivalent to $36 million in 2025) renovation project funded by the Federal Aviation Administration and airport enterprise funds. The project included construction of an 18,000-square-foot (1,700 m^{2}) terminal, new parking facilities, and an expanded aircraft ramp. The terminal incorporates updated passenger and baggage screening areas, a larger ticketing lobby and boarding lounge, and improved access from parking areas. Additional amenities include rental car office and restaurant.

The final United Express flights, operated by SkyWest Airlines, ended in May 2015 following the retirement of the Embraer EMB-120 Brasilia and SkyWest’s transition to regional jet aircraft requiring a longer runway.

Following the end of United Express service, several attempts were made to reintroduce service. BizAir Shuttle, operated by Ultimate Air Shuttle using Dornier 328JET aircraft, briefly served Los Angeles International Airport and McCarran International Airport in Las Vegas in 2015. In 2017, Cal Jet, operated by Elite Airways, began service to Las Vegas using a Bombardier CRJ700; the service ended in April 2018. California Pacific Airlines began service in November 2018 to San Jose and Reno, with later expansion to Las Vegas and Phoenix. The airline ceased operations in January 2019.

JSX announced service in 2016 but later canceled the planned routes. The company moved its flights from San Diego to Carlsbad in 2023, offering service to Las Vegas and Taos, New Mexico.

Commercial service resumed in 2025, when American Airlines (operated by Envoy Air as American Eagle) began flights to Phoenix Sky Harbor International Airport. These flights were on Embraer E175 aircarft. United Airlines (operated by SkyWest Airlines as United Express) resumed service in March 2026 with flights to Denver International Airport and San Francisco International Airport, also on the E175.

The resumption of commercial service has prompted opposition from some local groups, including the Palomar Airport Action Network and Citizens for a Friendly Airport, which have raised concerns regarding airport use and noise. The city of Carlsbad has asserted that Palomar is a general aviation airport and that opening it up to commercial flights constitutes an expansion.

== Accidents and incidents ==
- On January 24, 2006, a Cessna Citation V landing on runway 24 on a flight from Friedman Memorial Airport in Hailey, Idaho, burst into flames after crashing into a self-storage facility adjacent to the airport. All four aboard (two passengers and two crew) were killed; no one on the ground was hurt.
- On April 29, 2007, a Cessna 182 Skylane carrying three people crashed about 1 mile (1.6 km) offshore shortly after takeoff at 9:30 a.m.
- On July 3, 2007, a Beechcraft 90 King Air carrying two people crashed after taking off shortly after 6 a.m. in dense fog. The aircraft hit power lines, which caused power outages for local residents and businesses. The two on board died.
- On September 22, 2008, a Cessna 152 crashed just west of College Boulevard on the extended centerline after departing runway 24. The aircraft had two on board, who were both injured and evacuated by air.
- On September 28, 2008, a Beechcraft Bonanza crashed southeast of the airport after the pilot aborted a landing attempt in fog. The pilot was alone and was killed.
- On November 18, 2015, a Eurocopter AS350 Écureuil helicopter crashed at the airport, killing two people.
- On July 16, 2022, a Socata TB-21 on approach to the airport made a forced landing on a nearby street, striking a car and causing minor injuries to two in the car and two in the aircraft. The cause of the accident is under investigation.
- On April 2, 2025, a Piper Seminole suffered a gear collapse on touchdown and skidded a short distance. There were no casualties.
- On May 14, 2025, a Piper Arrow IV suffered a belly landing after having troubles deploying its landing gear in flight. There were no injuries.
