= List of Saab 340 operators =

The list of Saab 340 operators lists former, military and current operators of the aircraft as of 2015.

== Current operators ==
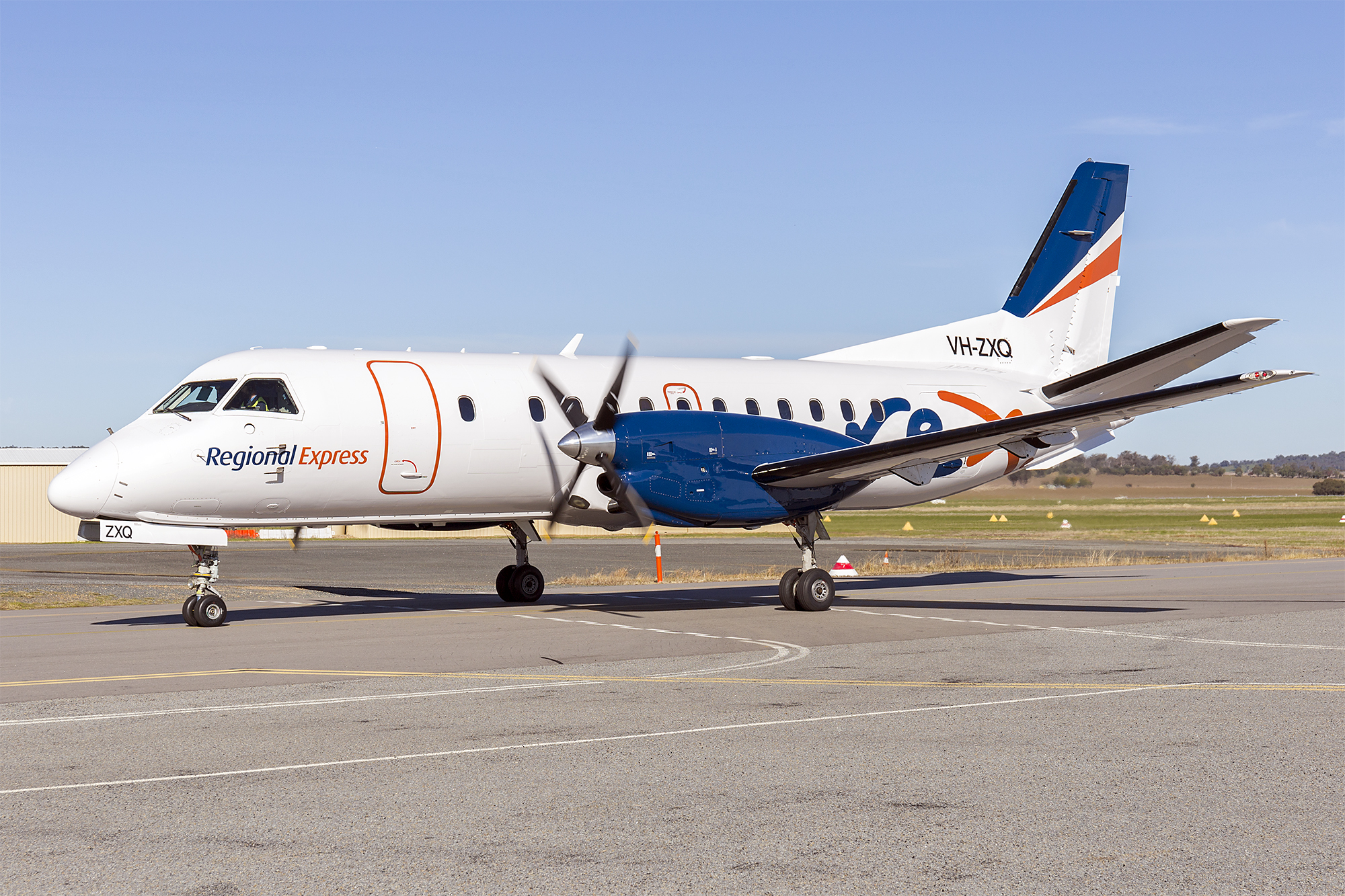
Rex Airlines Saab 340B

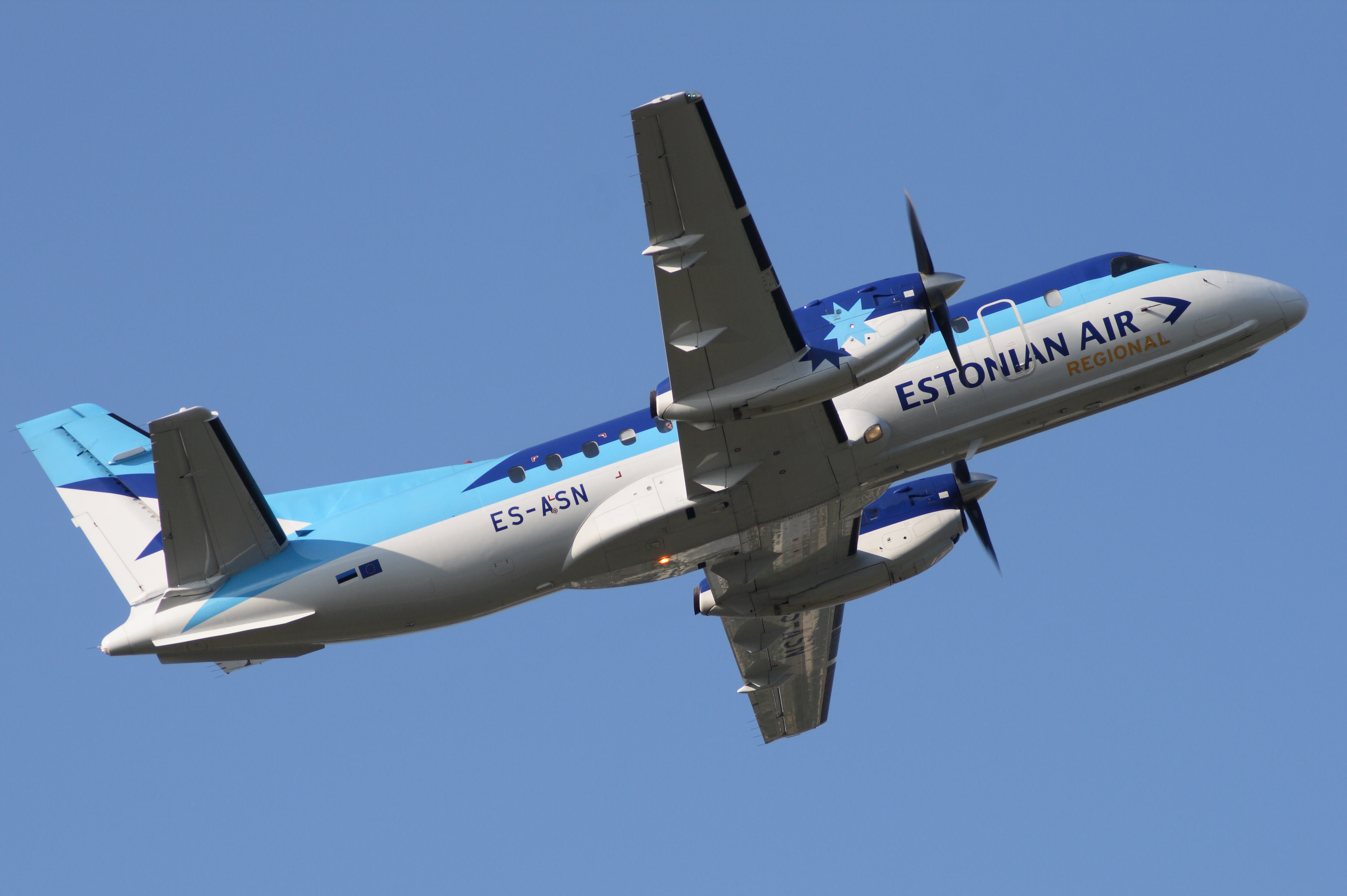
Estonian Air Saab 340

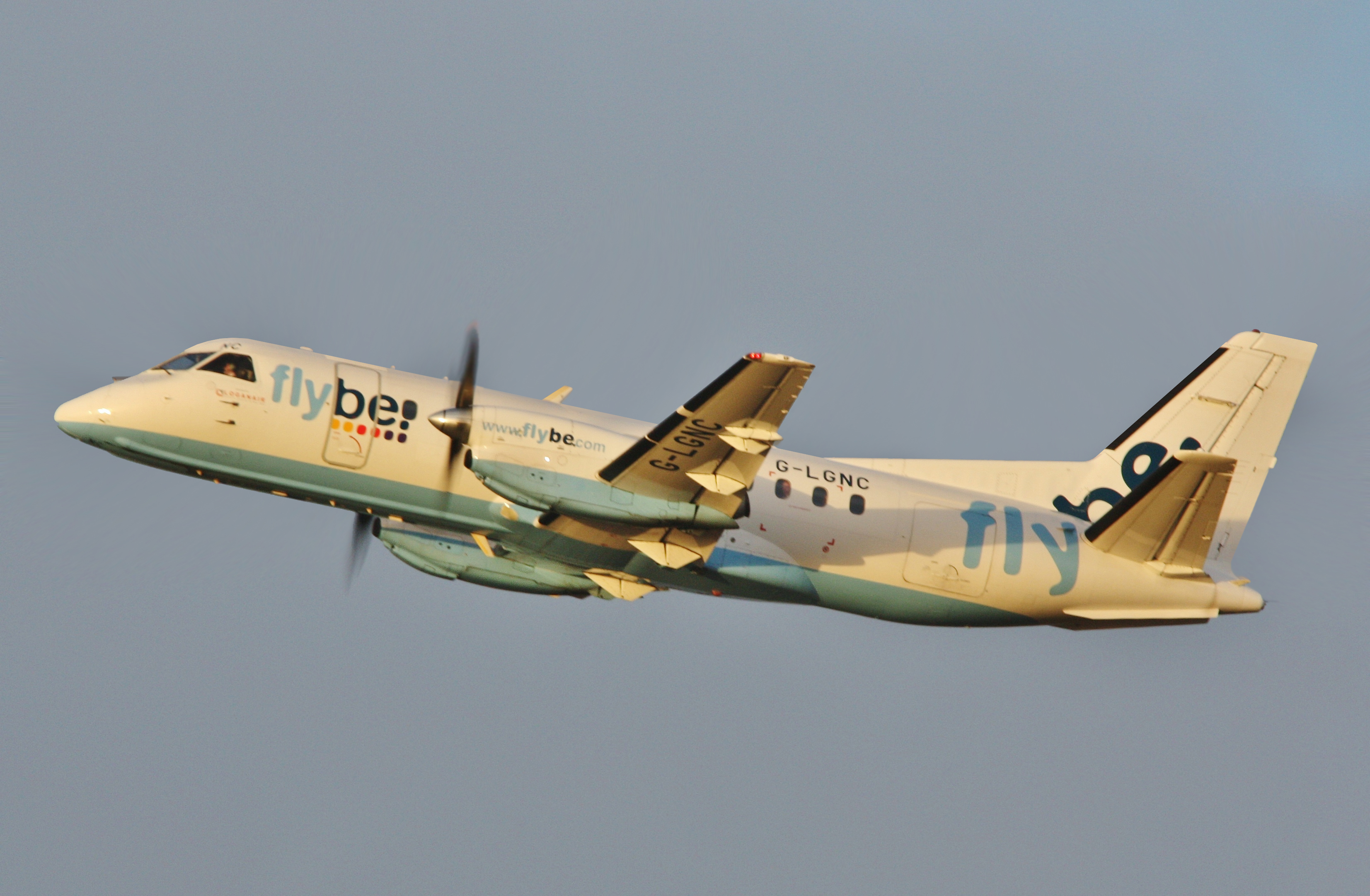
Flybe Saab 340

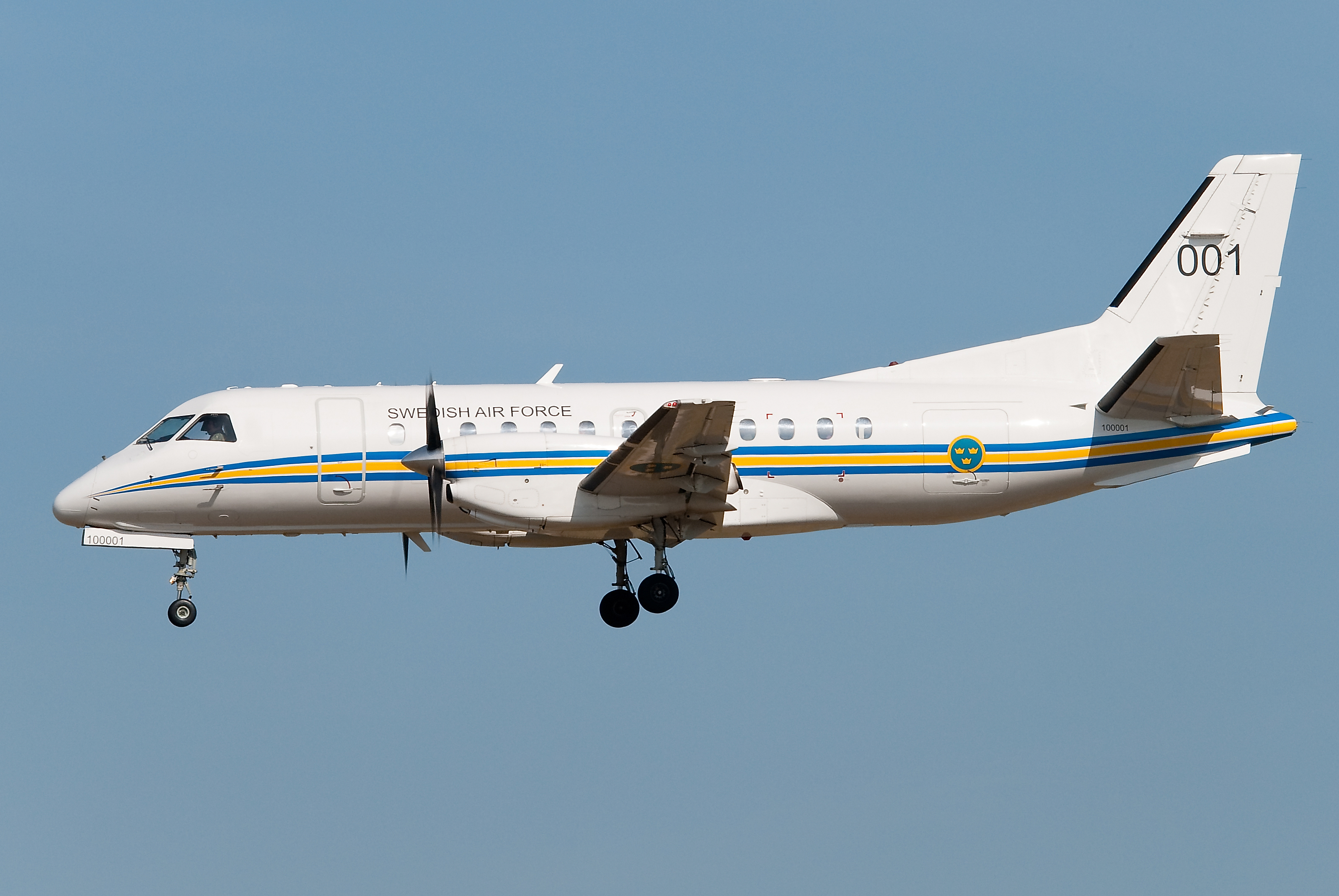
Swedish Air Force Saab 340

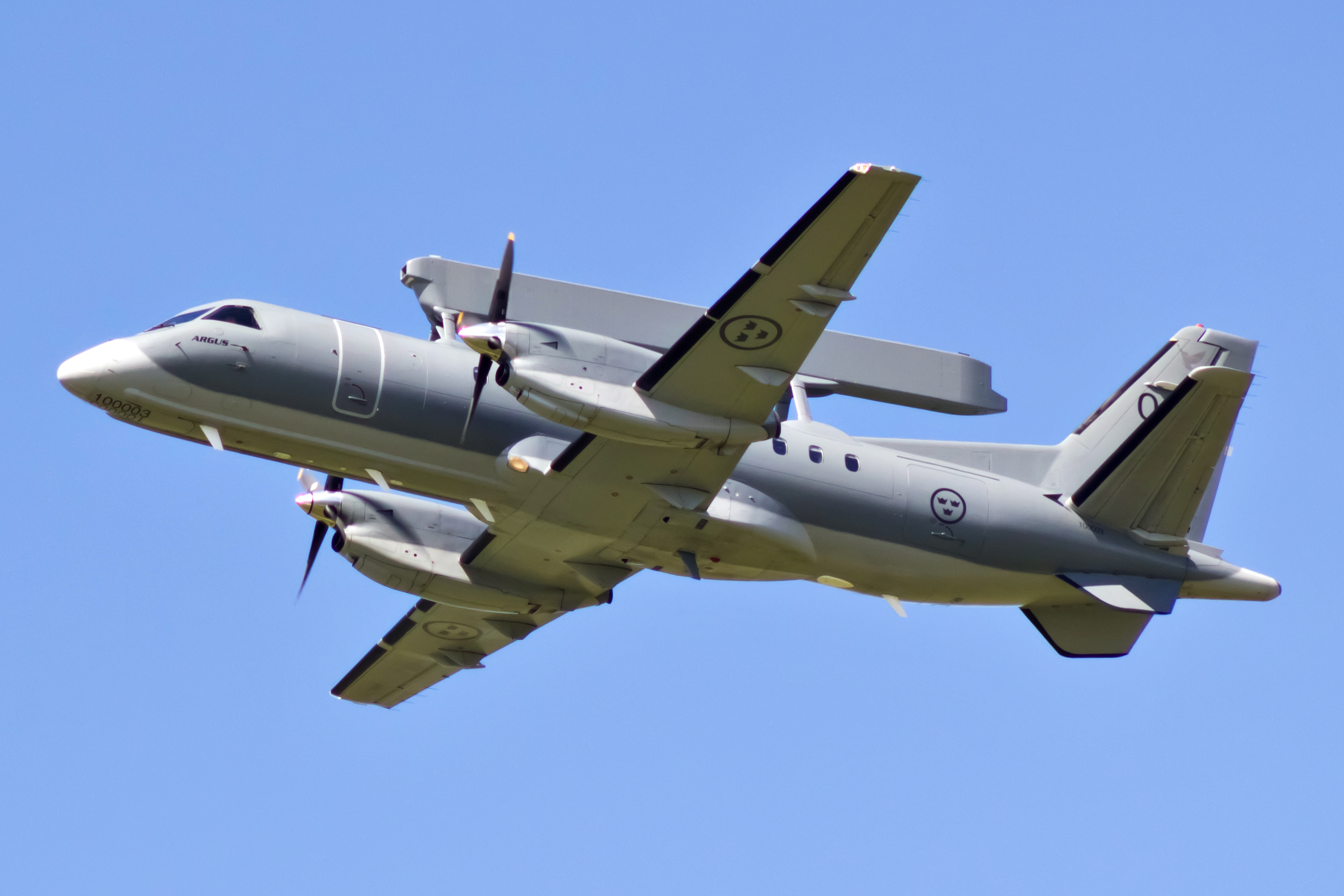
Swedish Air Force Saab 340 Argus

=== Civil operators ===
Argentina

- LADE

Australia

- Link Airways
- Pel-Air
- Rex Airlines

Bosnia and Herzegovina

- Icar Air

Canada

- Pacific Coastal Airlines
- Rise Air
- Pascan

Cayman Islands

- Cayman Airways

Cook Islands

- Air Rarotonga

Curaçao

- Z Air

Estonia

- NyxAir
- Airest

Guatemala

- Transportes Aéreos Guatemaltecos

Honduras

- Aerolíneas Sosa

Hungary

- Fleet Air

Latvia

- RAF-Avia

New Zealand

- Air Chathams

Poland

- SprintAir

Saint Vincent and the Grenadines

- One Caribbean

Tonga

- Lulutai Airlines

Ukraine

- Air Urga

United Kingdom

- Cranfield University - National Flying Laboratory Centre

United States

- Ameriflight
- Castle Aviation
- IBC Airways
- MIT Lincoln Laboratory
- Southern Airways Express
- Phoenix Air

=== Military operators ===
Argentina

- Argentine Air Force

Japan

- Japan Coast Guard

Sweden

- Swedish Air Force

Thailand

- Royal Thai Air Force

== Former operators ==
Argentina

- Andesmar
- Kaiken Líneas Aéreas
- LAER Línea Aérea Entre Ríos
- LAPA
- TAN Transportes Aéreos Neuquén
- TAPSA Transportes Aéreos Petroleros S.A
- SOL

Australia

- Hazelton Airlines
- Kendell Airlines

Austria

- Fairline
- Robin Hood Aviation

Bahamas

- Western Air

Canada

- Calm Air
- Corporate Express Charter and Business Flightline Solutions
- Prince Edward Air
- Provincial Airlines
- Quebecair Express

China

- China Southern Airlines

Colombia

- Aerotaca

Cyprus

- Tus Airways

Czech Republic

- Air Ostrava
- Job Air

Dominican Republic

- Caribair

East Timor

- Timor Air

Estonia

- Estonian Air

Finland

- Blue1
- Finnaviation
- Finncomm Airlines
  Åland Islands
  - Air Åland

France

- Air Vendee
- Alsavia
- BritAir
- Europe Aero Service
- Regional Airlines
- Darta

Gabon

- Nationale Regionale Transport

Germany

- Air Bremen
- City-Air
- Dauair
- Deutsche BA
- OLT

Guatemala

- Transportes Aéreos Guatemaltecos

Kyrgyzstan

- Eastok Avia

Ireland

- Aer Lingus

Japan

- Japan Air Commuter
- Hokkaido Air System

Kenya

- Kenya Airways

Kyrgyzstan

- SkyBishkek

Latvia

- RAF-Avia – cargo

Lithuania

- Avion Express
- DAT LT
- FlyLAL
- Nordic Solutions Air

Mexico

- Aerolitoral

Mongolia

- Eznis Airways

Moldova

- Moldavian Airlines

Netherlands

- KLM Cityhopper
- NetherLines

New Zealand

- Air Nelson
- Kiwi Regional Airlines
- Vincent Aviation

Norway

- Air Leap
- Norving
- Vildanden

Panama

- Air Panama

Poland

- Direct Fly
- SkyTaxi
- SprintAir

Puerto Rico

- Fina Air
- Seaborne Airlines

Romania

- Carpatair
- Direct Aero Services

Russia

- Polet Flight

Slovenia

- Adria Airways – cargo
- Tatra Air

Sweden

- Air Leap
- Avitrans Nordic
- Braathens Regional Airways
- Flying Enterprise
- NextJet
- Scandinavian Airlines
- Skyways
- SkyTaxi
- Swedair

Switzerland

- Crossair – launch customer

Thailand

- SGA Airlines
- Happy Air

Ukraine

- Business Aviation Center
- Dniproavia
- Mars RK
- South Airlines

United Kingdom

- Birmingham Executive Airways
- Business Air
- Manx Airlines
- Loganair
- RVL Aviation
  Guernsey
  - Aurigny Air Services

United States

- Air Midwest
- American Eagle Airlines
- Business Express
- Castle Aviation – Freighter launch customer
- Chicago Express
- Comair
- Express Airlines I/Pinnacle Airlines
- GLO Airlines
- Indiana University Foundation
- Mesaba Airlines
- National Airlines (5M)
- RegionsAir
- Shuttle America
- Silver Airways
- PenAir
