= List of defunct airlines of Poland =

This is a list of defunct airlines of Poland.

Airline	Image	IATA	ICAO	Callsign	Commenced operations	Ceased operations	Notes
4YOU Airlines			AMQ		2013	2014	
Aero					1925	1928	Nationalized and merged with Aerolot and Silesian Air Society to form LOT Polish Airlines
Aerolot					1922	1928	Nationalized and merged with Aero and Silesian Air Society to form LOT Polish Airlines
Aerotarg					1921	1921	
Air Batory Cargo					1991	1993	
Air Italy Polska		4Q	AEI		2007	2011	Rebranded as Air Poland
Air Poland		4Q	AEI	POLISH BIRD	2011	2012	
Air Polonia		4P	APN	AIR POLONIA	2001	2004	
Bingo Airways		BO	BGY	SKIMMER	2012	2014	
Centralwings		C0	CLW	CENTRALWINGS	2004	2009	
Direct Fly			SXP	EXPRESS SKY	2006	2009	
Eurolot		K2	ELO	EUROLOT	1997	2015	Went bankrupt
Fischer Air Polska		8F	FFP	FLYING FISH	2003	2006	Rebranded as Prima Charter
FlyLAL Charters			LLP		2010	2010	Rebranded as Small Planet Airlines
GetJet					2003	2004	
Globus Airlines					2003	2006	
Jet Air		O2	JEA	JETAIR	1998	2011	Rebranded as OLT Jetair
OLT Express		O2	YAP	WHITEKEKO	2012	2012	Went bankrupt
OLT Jetair		O2	JEA		2011	2012	
Polnippon Cargo			PLN		1990	1996	
Polonia Airways			PAW		1994	1999	
Prima Charter		8F	FFP	FLYING FISH	2006	2008	
Silesian Air			LSN	SILESIAN	2003	2005	
Small Planet Airlines		P7	LLP	SKYPOL	2010	2018	
Travel Service Polska		3Z	TVP	JET TRAVEL	2012	2018	Rebranded as Smartwings Poland
Turavia					1992		
White Eagle Aviation		W2	WEA	WHITE EAGLE	1992	2009	
Yes Airways			YAP		2009	2011	Renamed OLT Express

== See also ==
- List of airlines of Poland
- List of airports in Poland
