= List of airlines of Poland =

This is a list of existing airlines in Poland.

== Scheduled airlines ==
Airline	Image	IATA	ICAO	Callsign	Founded	Notes
LOT Polish Airlines		LO	LOT	LOT	1929	Flag carrier

== Charter airlines ==
Airline	Image	IATA	ICAO	Callsign	Founded	Notes
Air 001		AM			2025	Airlines is run by Itaka, a travel agency in cooperation with Electra Airways
Buzz		RR	RYS	MAGIC SUN	2018	(previously Ryanair Sun)
Enter Air		E4	ENT	ENTERAIR	2009	
LOT Charters			CLW	CENTRAL WINGS	2009	
Skytaxi		TE	IGA	IGUANA	2000	
SprintAir		I8	SRN	SPRINTAIR	2008	(former Air Polonia Cargo, Sky Express, Direct Fly)
Smartwings Poland		3Z	TVP	JET TRAVEL	2011	(previously Travel Service Polska)

== Cargo airlines ==
Airline	Image	IATA	ICAO	Callsign	Founded	Notes
SprintAir Cargo			SAR	SPRINTAIR CARGO	2006	(formerly known as Sky Carrier, currently operates under SprintAir)

== See also ==
- List of defunct airlines of Poland
- List of airports in Poland
- List of defunct airlines of Europe
