= Aluu Airlines =

Aluu Airlines was a planned Greenlandic virtual airline, that never operated. The airline expected to commence operating services initially to four destinations between Greenland, Iceland and Denmark. Aluu airlines closed in January 2018.
