= Vizion Air =

Belgian virtual airline

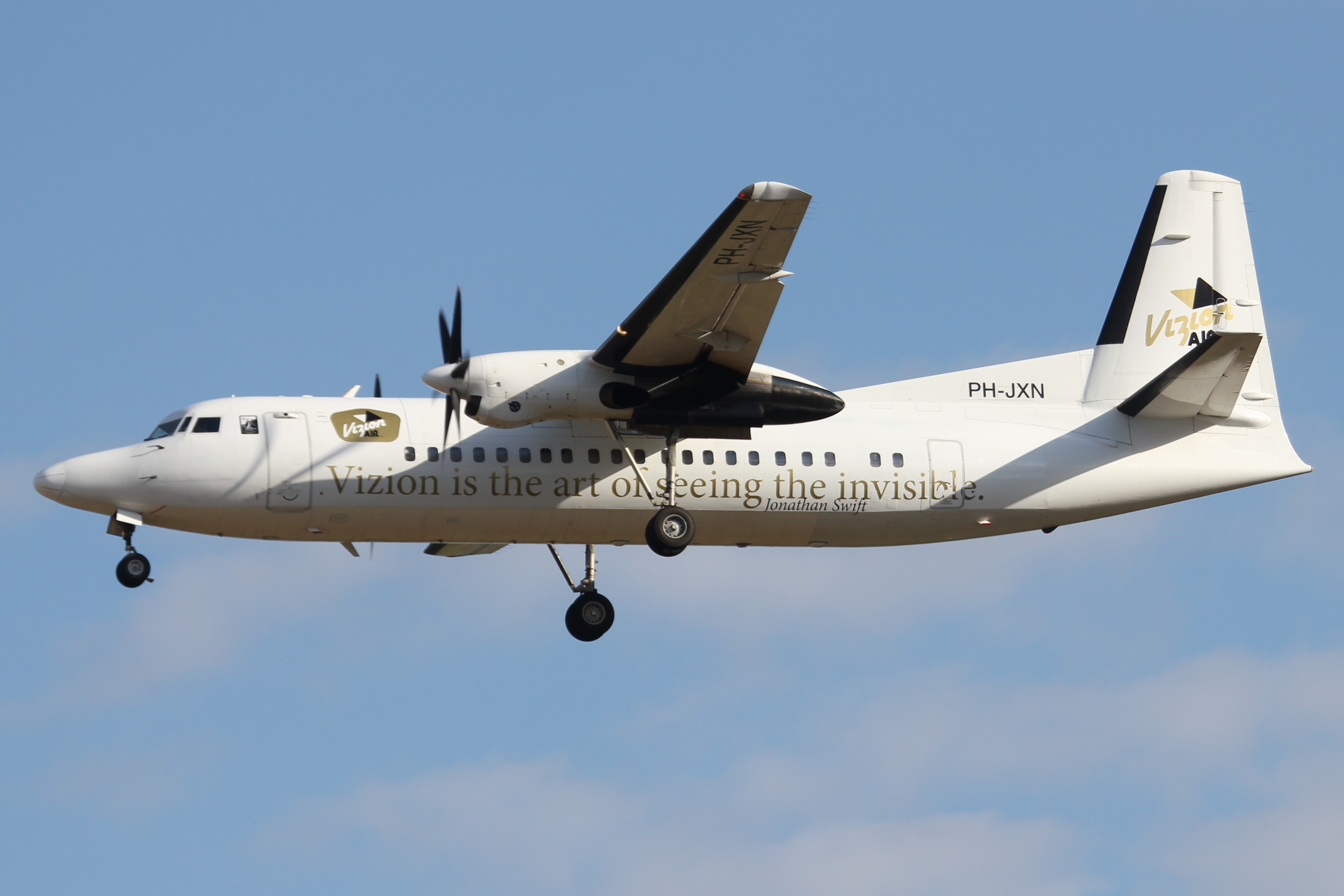
- Fokker 50
- Founded: January 2013
- Operating bases: Antwerp International Airport
- Fleet size: 3
- Parent company: The Aviation Factory Group
- Headquarters: Antwerp, Belgium
- Website: vizionair.aero

Vizion Air is a virtual charter airline based at Antwerp International Airport in Antwerp, Belgium. Starting in early 2013 VLM Airlines operated flights on behalf of Vizion Air with two Fokker 50s until the airline went bankrupt. Poland's Sprintair became Vizion Air's new partner in 2017. Sprintair originally provided an ATR 72-200 and a Saab SF-340. Air Antwerp operated flights with a former VLM Airlines Fokker 50 out of Antwerp.

== Fleet ==
Vizion Air fleet
| Aircraft | Total | Passengers | Airport | Notes |
|---|---|---|---|---|
| Fokker 50 | 1 | 50 | Antwerp International Airport | Air Antwerp |
| Saab 340 | 1 | 33 | Châlons Vatry Airport | SprintAir |
| Fairchild Dornier 328JET | 1 | 32 | Augsburg Airport | JoinJet |
