= Jetisfaction =

German airline

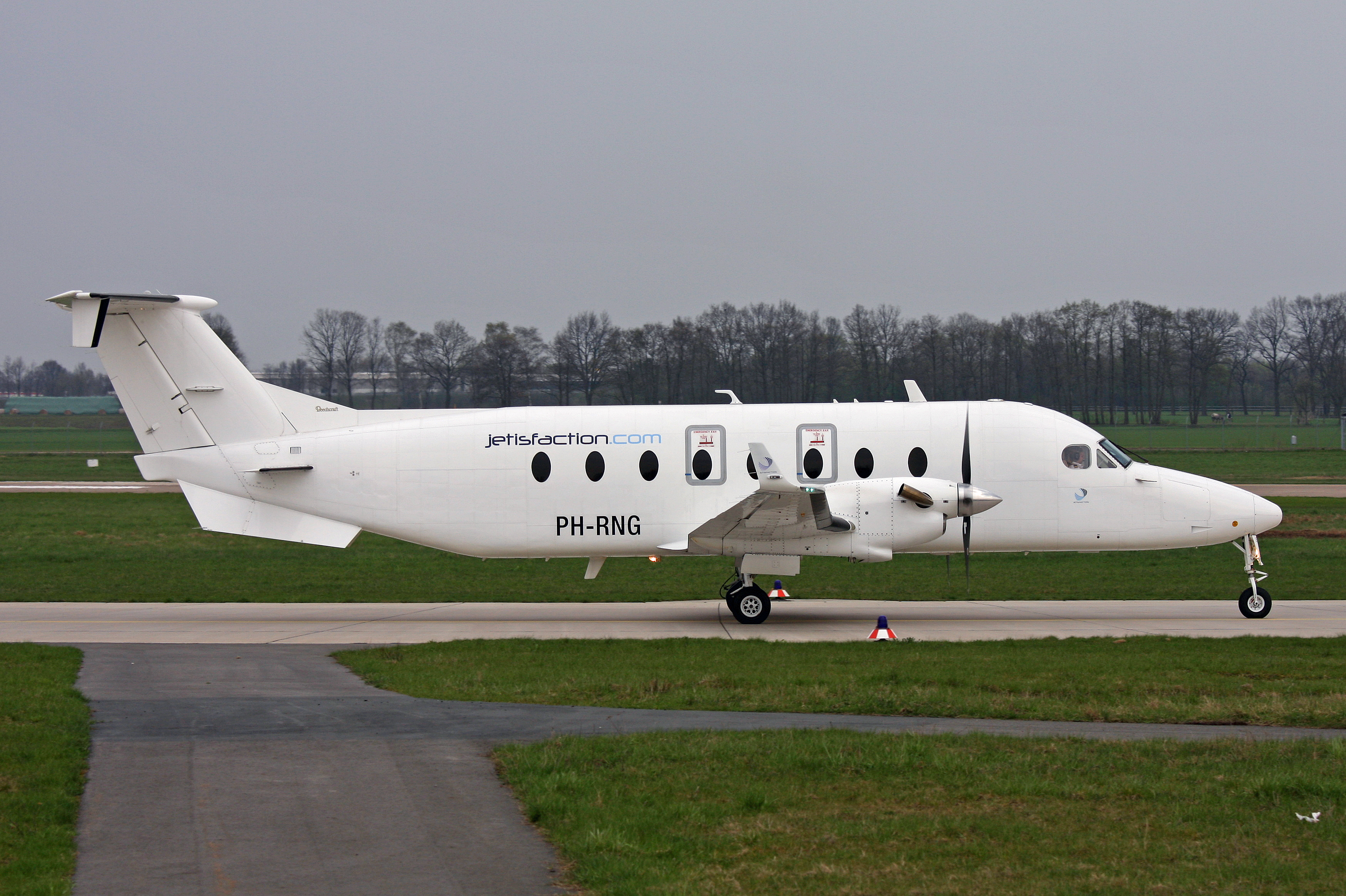
- leased Beechcraft 1900D
IATA	ICAO	Call sign
—	—	—
- Founded: 2010
- Commenced operations: September 2011
- Ceased operations: 2012
- Destinations: 4
- Headquarters: Münster Osnabrück Airport
- Website: jetisfaction.com

Jetisfaction was a German virtual airline based at Münster Osnabrück Airport.

== History ==
Jetisfaction was founded as a business charter airline. It subsequently started scheduled operations effective 8 September 2011 with routes from its hub at Münster/Osnabrück to Zurich, Poznań and Wrocław. All flights were operated by a Saab 340A leased from Polish airline SkyTaxi and other airline's aircraft up to the required demand.

A planned additional scheduled route to London-Southend had to be postponed in October 2011 while the company was supposedly in search for new investors. However, Jetisfaction filed for insolvency and ceased all operations in early 2012.

== Destinations ==
Jetisfaction marketed the following scheduled destinations:

- Münster/Osnabrück - Münster Osnabrück Airport
- Poznań - Poznań–Ławica Airport
- Wrocław - Wrocław Airport
- Zurich - Zurich Airport

== Fleet ==
Jetisfaction had no own aircraft. The operations were untrusted to other airlines and their regional-type equipment.
