= Vildanden =

Vildanden may refer to:

- Vildanden (airline), a Norwegian airline.
- Vildanden (The Wild Duck), a play by Henrik Ibsen.
