= AirGotland =

Defunct virtual airline

Air Gotland Express AB (Virtual airline)
- Founded: 2020; 6 years ago
- Commenced operations: 13 August 2020; 6 years ago
- Ceased operations: January 2022
- Hubs: Visby
- Focus cities: Stockholm Bromma
- Fleet size: 1
- Destinations: 2
- Headquarters: Visby
- Key people: Tiina Mykkänen (CEO) Michael Juniwik (Chairman)
- Website: https://www.airgotland.se/

AirGotland was the trading name of the Swedish Virtual airline Air Gotland Express AB.

== History ==
AirGotland was first founded by a local initiative on the Swedish island of Gotland, under the working title Nya Gotlandsflyget (The new Gotland airplane). On 28 May 2020, they announced the new name AirGotland, after a name contest. On 17 July 2020, AirGotland announced their new commercial partner Polish airline SprintAir. The Polish airline would operate a Saab 340 on behalf of AirGotland on their routes.

The airline commenced operations on 13 August 2020, with one to three daily flights between Visby and Stockholm Bromma.

== Destinations ==
This is a list of destinations operated by AirGotland:

Country	City	Airport	Notes	Refs
Sweden	Stockholm	Stockholm Bromma Airport		
Sweden	Visby	Visby Airport	Base	

== Fleet ==
As of August 2020, the AirGotland fleet consists of the following aircraft:

Aircraft	In service	Orders	Passengers	Notes
Saab 340	1	—	33	Operated by SprintAir
Total	1	—		
