= 4YOU Airlines =

Defunct Polish virtual aviation company

- Industry: Travel
- Founded: 2014
- Defunct: 2014
- Headquarters: Poland

4YOU Airlines was a Polish virtual airline owned by tour operator Alfa Star. It operated charter services and was prepared to transition into a low-cost carrier, however, it declared bankruptcy in October 2014.

== History ==
4YOU Airlines started operations in the spring of 2014 by offering leisure charter flights mainly to the Mediterranean.

In September 2014, 4YOU Airlines temporarily suspended their charter operations to prepare their planned rebranding into a scheduled carrier. They were expected to resume service with their new route network in November 2014 despite issues with ticketing and the Civil Aviation Office. It has been claimed that 4YOU Airlines sold tickets before actually having the necessary licenses to operate their routes on offer.

However, on 24 October 2014 the airline declared bankruptcy. Additionally, a circuit prosecutor's office in Warsaw launched an investigation because 4YOU Airlines started to sell tickets without a concession and other documents so at that time it wasn't considered an air carrier.

== Destinations ==
After their rebranding 4YOU Airlines planned to establish bases at Łódź Władysław Reymont Airport and Rzeszów–Jasionka Airport to offer flights from there mainly to European metropolitan destinations. The route network – which never came into being – had been announced as follows:

Belgium

- Charleroi – Brussels South Charleroi Airport

France

- Paris – Charles de Gaulle Airport

Germany

- Dortmund – Dortmund Airport

Israel

- Tel Aviv – Ben Gurion Airport

Italy

- Bergamo – Il Caravaggio International Airport
- Rome – Leonardo da Vinci–Fiumicino Airport

Poland

- Łódź – Łódź Władysław Reymont Airport, base (should have begun 2 November 2014)
- Rzeszów – Rzeszów–Jasionka Airport, base (should have begun 2 November 2014)

Spain

- Girona – Girona–Costa Brava Airport

United Kingdom

- Edinburgh – Edinburgh Airport
- London – Luton Airport

== Fleet ==
As 4YOU Airlines was a virtual carrier without its own AOC, it used aircraft from other airlines such as Grand Cru Airlines and YanAir.
