= Air Croatia =

Croatian virtual airline (2013–2015)

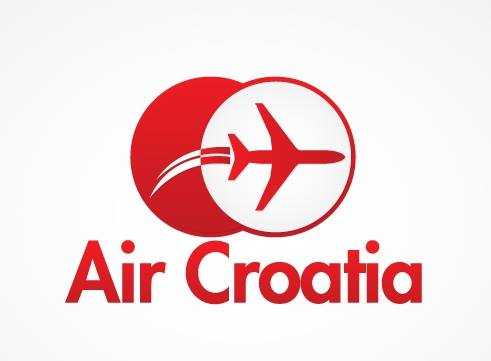

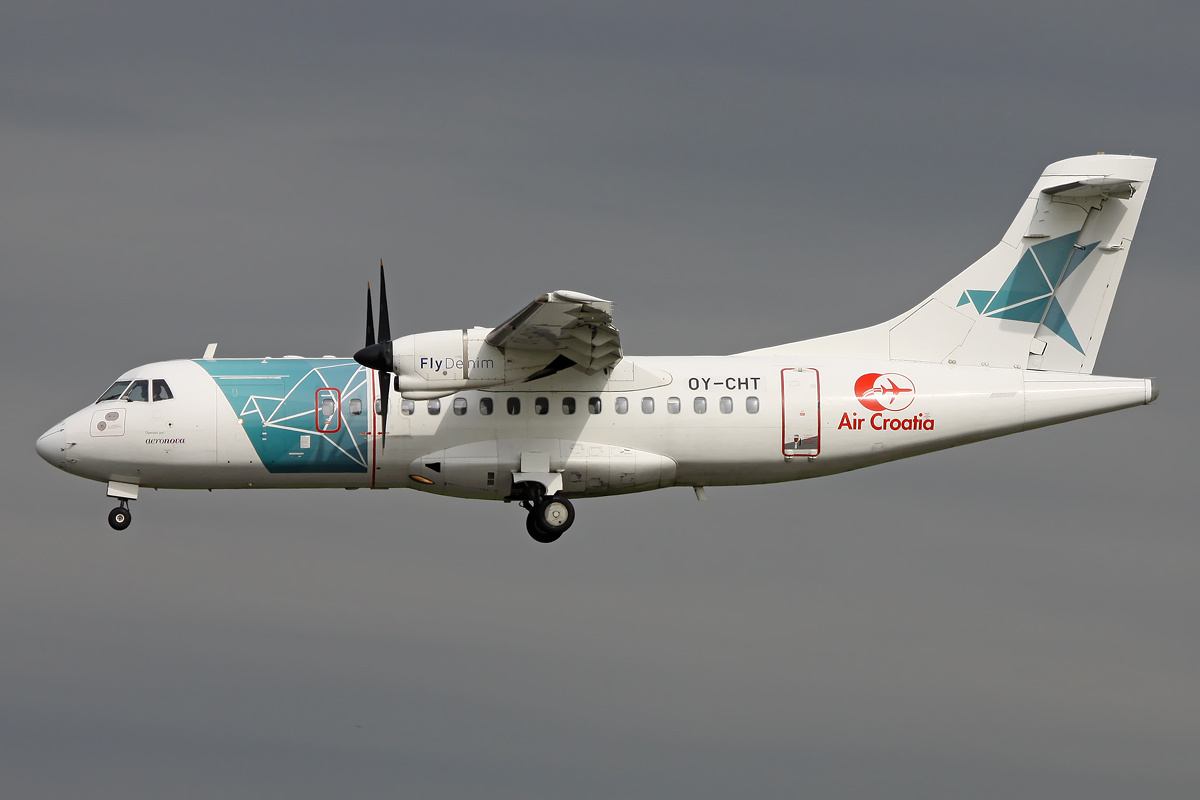
- ATR 42-300
IATA	ICAO	Call sign
J7	DNM	—
- Founded: 2013; 13 years ago
- Ceased operations: 2015; 11 years ago
- Hubs: Zagreb Airport
- Fleet size: 1
- Destinations: 5
- Headquarters: Zagreb, Croatia
- Website: aircroatia.eu

Air Croatia was a Croatian virtual airline. It offered flights to European destinations from its base at Zagreb Airport but was legally registered in London.

== History ==
Originally the airline was founded in 2013 and planned to start operations by summer 2014, but this was rescheduled to 18 December 2014 and subsequently postponed to 1 March 2015, and then again until 2 April 2015, when the operations finally commenced. The airline originally announced it would operate an Embraer 170 but instead started to utilize an ATR 42-300 operated by Denim Air.

Since November 2014, Air Croatia was in partnership with Hahn Air for ticket distribution via their Global Distribution System using the code H1. However, the airline continued to report poor sales for its flights to Prague, Rome and Budapest. Subsequently, the route from Zagreb to Budapest has been suspended after just one return flight operated.

As of 23 April 2015, all remaining routes were suspended due to a financial dispute between the airline and their contracted credit card payment agency leading to a lack of funding to fulfil their leasing payments to Denim Air.

== Destinations ==
As of April 2015, Air Croatia offered scheduled flights to the following destinations:

^{Hub}	Hub
^{†}	Future destinations
^{‡}	Seasonal
^{§}	Terminated Destinations

City	Country	IATA	ICAO	Airport
Budapest	Hungary	BUD	LHBP	Budapest International Airport (suspended)
Milan	Italy	MXP	LIMC	Malpensa Airport (suspended)
Prague	Czech Republic	PRG	LKPR	Václav Havel Airport Prague (suspended)
Rome	Italy	FCO	LIRF	Fiumicino – Leonardo da Vinci International Airport (suspended)
Zagreb	Croatia	ZAG	LDZA	Zagreb Airport ^{base}

== Fleet ==
As of May 2015, the Air Croatia fleet consisted of one leased ATR 42-300.
