= Snowbird Airlines =

2013–2014 Finnish airline

IATA	ICAO	Call sign
—	SBW	SNOWMAN
- Founded: January 2013
- Commenced operations: October 2014
- Ceased operations: December 2014
- Operating bases: Helsinki Airport
- Fleet size: None (virtual airline)
- Destinations: 7
- Parent company: Snowbird Airlines Oy
- Headquarters: Vantaa, Finland
- Key people: Marja Aalto (owner, CEO and board chairman); Harri Tikkunen (owner); Seppo Rissanen (owner)
- Website: www.snowbird.fi

Snowbird Airlines (ICAO: SBW) was a Finnish charter airline based at Helsinki Airport. The airline was founded in 2013 and was owned by Snowbird Airlines Oy (Ltd) while a separate company Lumilintu Oy (Ltd) operated marketing.

The airline's planned to start operating flights in mid-2014 were thwarted by tour operators cancelling agreements as well as a dispute with the Finnish Competition and Consumer Authority (FCCA). Snowbird made its first flight, operated by Smartlynx Estonia, on October 2, 2014. However, operations were suspended in December 2014.

== History ==
Snowbird's background is in the bankruptcy of Air Finland in 2012. Several senior employees of Air Finland, including Snowbird CEO Marja Aalto, went on to found Snowbird in 2013 in order to cater for the Finnish charter airline market that was left unsupplied after the bankruptcy. Despite foreign charter companies operating in Finland, provincial airports were found to be costly destinations for tour operators relying on foreign airlines. Additionally, Lapland destinations were deemed to be poorly accessible to Central European tourists. It is these two markets — Finnish package holiday tourists from provincial airports headed for Mediterranean destinations with intermediate stops in Helsinki, and Central European tourists bound for holiday destinations in the north of Finland — that Snowbird decided to concentrate on.

The founding of a new airline in the midst of the continuing economic uncertainty in Europe was met with skepticism within parts of the aviation community. By mid-2014 Snowbird has had to postpone the beginning of its flight operations a few times as well as rework its choice of destinations. There is also a dispute with the Finnish Competition and Consumer Authority (FCCA). FCCA regards Snowbird as a virtual airline and has forbidden the airline from selling flights directly to consumers before it either registers as a travel agency or is approved for operational air travel by the Finnish Transport Safety Agency TraFi. However, the company has appealed the decision and is not offering flights until this has been resolved. According to CEO Marja Aalto, the FCCA decision has hampered the company's efforts to find financial backers in Finland and they are now looking toward attracting foreign capital.

In December 2014 operations were suspended. The airline hoped to return to operation later after revising its strategy. However, as of February 2017, the airline never resumed operations.

== Destinations ==
Snowbird Airlines used to serve the following route network:

Airport	Destinations
Enontekiö, Finland	Helsinki, London-Gatwick (Seasonal)
Helsinki, Finland	Enontekiö, Malága, Oulu
Lappeenranta, Finland	Malága, Oulu
Oulu, Finland	Helsinki, Lappeenranta
Alicante, Spain	Lappeenranta, Oulu
Málaga, Spain	Helsinki, Lappeenranta, Oulu
London-Gatwick, United Kingdom	Enontekiö (Seasonal)

== Fleet ==
Snowbird was a virtual airline and did not initially operate any aircraft of its own and planned to lease one from another company. A further turbo-prop aircraft was intended to be leased, possibly from Budapest Aircraft Service, to operate the Helsinki-Enontekiö leg of the flight from London. Later a partnership with a leasing option from Vueling was thought to be possible. Snowbird also planned to acquire an Airbus A320 of its own once they are certified for conducting air operations.

== Services ==
Snowbird insisted on providing quality service both on board the flights and on the ground and dissociates itself from low cost carrier business model. The company planned to employ predominantly domestic workforce, citing the high level of professionalism in Finnish aviation. There were plans of inflight sales of local products, including design jewelry.
