= NewLeaf =

Canadian air travel ticket reseller

NewLeaf Travel Company
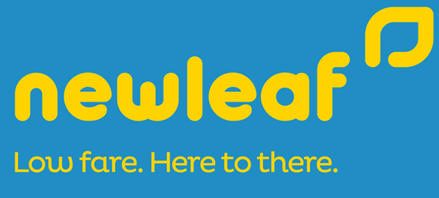
- Industry: Virtual airline
- Founded: April 2015
- Defunct: July 25, 2017
- Headquarters: Winnipeg, Manitoba, Canada
- Owner: Flair Airlines
- Website: gonewleaf.ca

NewLeaf Travel Company Inc., branded as NewLeaf, was a Canadian virtual airline, or ticket reseller, based at Winnipeg James Armstrong Richardson International Airport in Manitoba. It sold tickets for flights operated by Flair Airlines.

In June 2017 Flair Airlines bought the company with plans to expand its service. The NewLeaf brand was retired on July 25, 2017, when scheduled flights were brought under the Flair Airlines brand.

== History ==
NewLeaf was founded in April 2015 and originally described as an ultra low-cost carrier. As a result of the CTA case, the company was later positioned instead as a reseller, buying airline seats and then reselling them to the public.

Jim Young, a former executive of Frontier Airlines and Canada Jetlines, proposed the venture. Young announced the airline will fly to secondary airports in Canada to save on landing fees; it will also offer vacation packages, after experimenting with selling spring ski packages to the Okanagan. The airline will partner with Flair Airlines, which will provide aircraft, crew and maintenance.

On June 8, 2015, the company selected Winnipeg Airport as its[headquarters and hub, along with Kelowna Airport and Hamilton Airport as bases.

In July 2016 two consulting companies who had done work in 2014 and 2015 for NewLeaf levelled complaints that they had not been paid a total of $135,000 owed. The unpaid bills raised concerns that the company was having solvency issues, although a lawyer representing NewLeaf characterized the issues as supplier disagreements. One of the unpaid vendors launched a lawsuit against the company in July 2016 for the owed $76,000.

On July 12, 2016, it was reported that the company was no longer planning to serve Fort St. John, British Columbia, an initially planned destination. Just five days prior to the first scheduled flights the company had not finalized arrangements, including landing fee deposits with Kelowna International Airport.

In July 2016, just before launching their service, CBC News reported that the company had some of the highest extra fees in the airline industry. CBC highlighted NewLeaf for their fees of up to $92 to bring a carry-on bag on a flight and up to $80.50 for each checked bag.

A management analyst from the University of Toronto Rotman School of Management said that the outstanding unpaid consultants and lack of airport deposits indicated that the company might be underfunded for start-up. He called the company a "shoestring effort" and assessed its chances of surviving a year in business as under 25%.

The first Flair Airlines flight operated for NewLeaf took off on July 25, 2016, departing Hamilton for Winnipeg.

The company had announced that it would offer flights from Calgary and Edmonton to Phoenix–Mesa Gateway Airport commencing January 19, 2017, and from Hamilton to Melbourne Orlando International Airport, commencing January 15, 2017, but on January 3, 2017, they cancelled both routes, indicating that competition from WestJet on the same routes made them non-viable. The company had already sold many tickets to both destinations when they cancelled the routes. Passenger rights advocate Gabor Lukacs said, "it appears they are skirting their obligation to the public. This is a very very troublesome attitude." The CTA said that because it was not an airline, the company did not fall under its jurisdiction. Airline analyst Rick Erickson said, "that's one of the risks you take when you go with a new startup versus one of the very well established majors. You can't be selling a $150 ticket to Phoenix, one way, and begin to think you can put that passenger on another carrier. Say a U.S. carrier going over Denver, the ticket is going to be $450, and NewLeaf just can't handle those costs."

In January 2017 NewLeaf cancelled a series of Sunday flights from Hamilton to Halifax, Halifax to Hamilton, Abbotsford to Edmonton and from Edmonton to Kelowna, citing a scheduling conflict with Flair Airlines that resulted in a lack of aircraft to fly the routes. NewLeaf spokeswoman Julie Rempel said that the "schedule change" would last six weeks and stated that "passengers have either been re-accommodated or can travel with us on a different day".

In June 2017 Flair Airlines bought NewLeaf. Flair said, "expansion is planned for new destinations beginning this year, plus the fall and winter domestic schedule will be released shortly,"

=== Legal challenge ===
On January 6, 2016, NewLeaf held press conferences at its three bases to announce it would begin flights on February 12, 2016. However, on January 18 NewLeaf announced the inaugural date had been postponed until the Canadian Transportation Agency (CTA) completed review of its licensing procedures. The review was to determine whether NewLeaf would be allowed to operate under an indirect licence, i.e. the licence of Flair Airlines or require its own operating certificate. While the case was being considered by the CTA, NewLeaf refunded all previously sold tickets. On March 29, 2016, the CTA completed the review and ruled that these airlines are not required to hold separate licenses.

Following the March 2016 ruling, NewLeaf indicated that they would soon resume booking. However, the next month, Gábor Lukács, an air passenger advocate, filed a request for leave to appeal the CTA decision to the Federal Court of Appeal and the court granted leave for the appeal. The company announced on June 23, 2016 that they would commence selling tickets immediately for flights that would start on July 25, 2016.

In late July the company announced that it was suing Lukács in the Manitoba Court of Queen's Bench for defamation, requesting unspecified damages. The company alleged that Lukács carried out an "unrelenting, aggressive and malicious attack" via social media and published "false and/or misleading" information about the company and its business model.

== Destinations ==
NewLeaf sold tickets for flights to the following destinations (flights operated by Flair Airlines):

| Country | City | Airport | Notes | Ref. |
|---|---|---|---|---|
| Canada | Abbotsford | Abbotsford International Airport | — | |
| Canada | Calgary | Calgary International Airport^{Seasonal} | — | |
| Canada | Edmonton | Edmonton International Airport | — | |
| Canada | Halifax | Halifax Stanfield International Airport | — | |
| Canada | Hamilton | John C. Munro Hamilton International Airport | — | |
| Canada | Kamloops | Kamloops Airport | Suspended | |
| Canada | Kelowna | Kelowna International Airport | Suspended | |
| Canada | Regina | Regina International Airport | Suspended | |
| Canada | Moncton | Greater Moncton International Airport | Suspended | |
| Canada | Saskatoon | Saskatoon John G. Diefenbaker International Airport | Suspended | |
| Canada | Victoria | Victoria International Airport | Suspended | |
| Canada | Winnipeg | Winnipeg James Armstrong Richardson International Airport | — | |

== Fleet ==
NewLeaf, as a virtual airline, did not own or operate any aircraft directly but sold tickets on services operated by Flair Airlines using Boeing 737-400 aircraft.

== See also ==
- History of aviation in Canada
- List of defunct airlines of Canada
