= Flair Airlines =

Ultra-low-cost airline of Canada

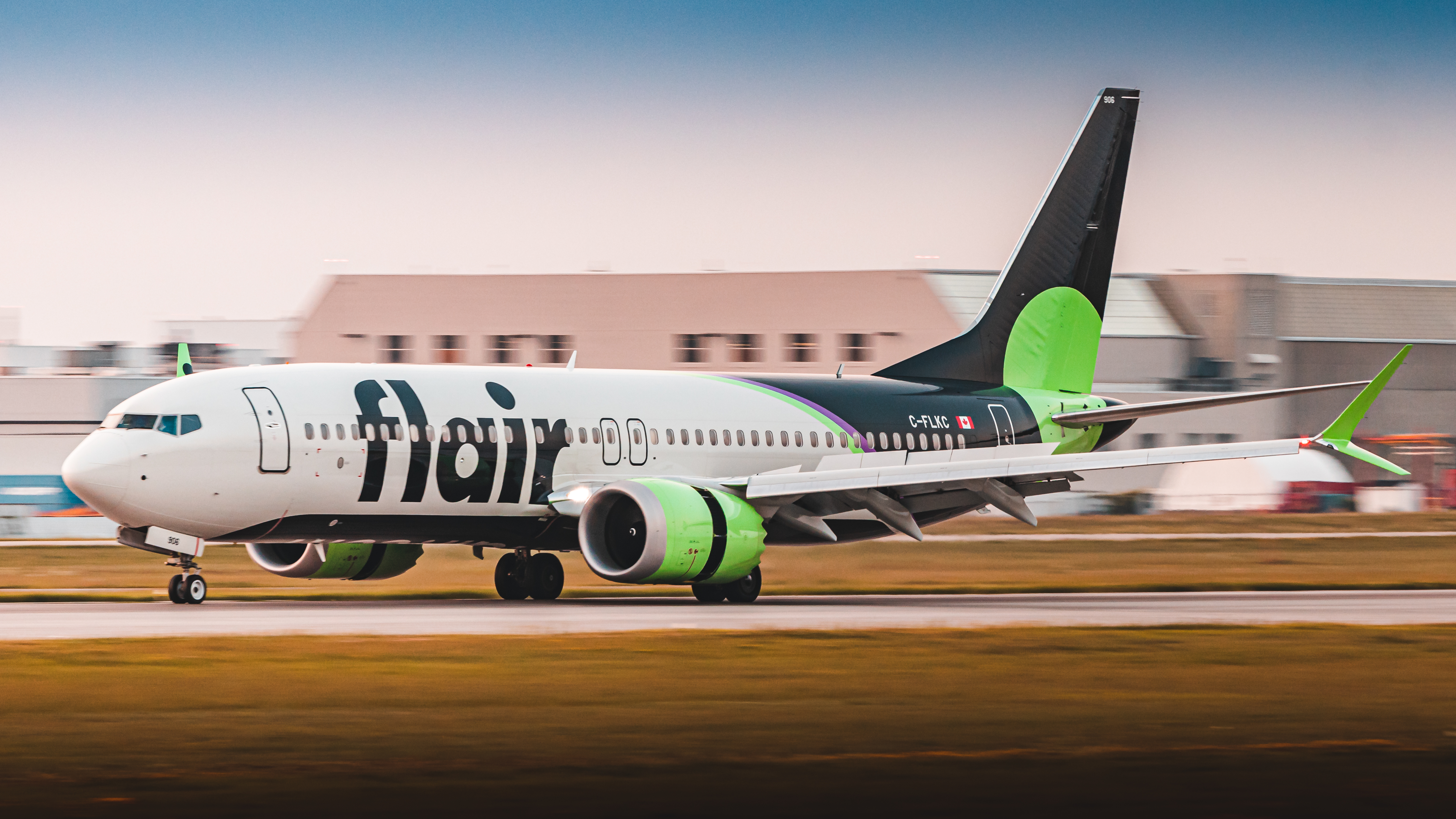
- A Flair Airlines 737 MAX 8
IATA	ICAO	Call sign
F8	FLE	FLAIR
- Founded: August 19, 2005; 21 years ago (as Flair Air)
- Commenced operations: 2017; 9 years ago (as Flair Airlines)
- AOC #: Canada: 14941; United States: F8RF148F
- Operating bases: Calgary; Edmonton; Kitchener/Waterloo; Toronto–Pearson; Vancouver; Winnipeg
- Fleet size: 20
- Destinations: 34
- Headquarters: Edmonton, Alberta, Canada
- Key people: Len Corrado (Chief Executive Officer)
- Employees: 1,250 (Jan 2024)
- Website: www.flyflair.com

Flair Airlines is a Canadian airline headquartered in Edmonton, Alberta. The airline operates scheduled passenger and chartered services with a fleet of Boeing 737 aircraft. The airline promotes itself as being Canada's leading independent value carrier.

== History ==
=== 2005–2008 ===
Flair Air logo, 2005–2017

The airline began operations as a privately owned company on August 19, 2005, under the name Flair Air. In January 2006, Transport Canada authorized the airline to operate scheduled all-cargo services between Cuba and Canada, on behalf of Cubana de Aviación, until April 7, 2006. It also operated some passenger flights on behalf of Cubana. Flair Air operated two Boeing 727-200 aircraft - one for passenger movements and the other for freight services. During this period, Flair also began providing workforce transportation services to several natural resources and major construction companies across Canada.

=== 2008–2019 ===
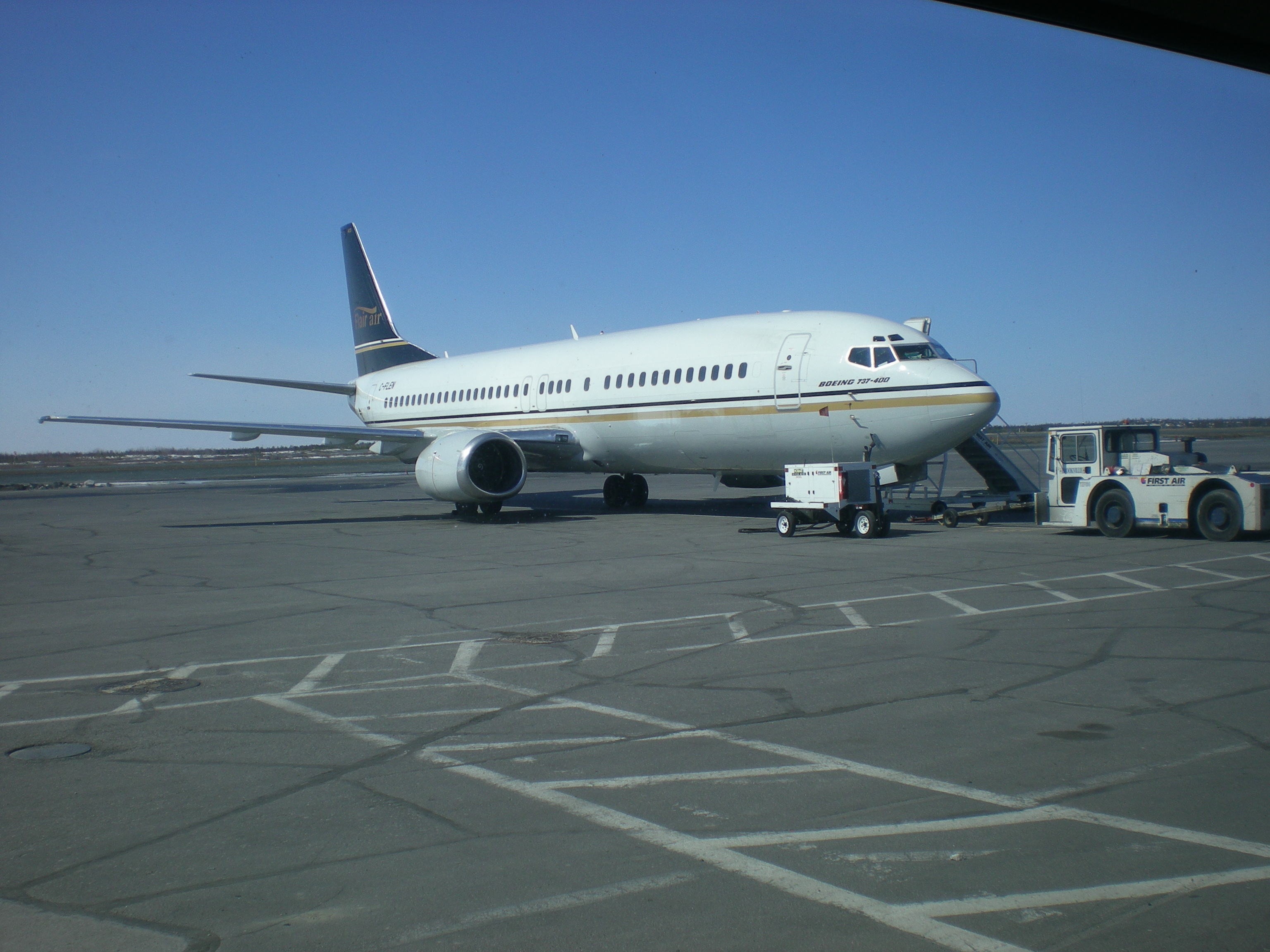
A former Flair Air Boeing 737-400 in the pre-2017 livery

Flair began adding Boeing 737-400 aircraft to its fleet in 2008 to replace the 727-200s. The airline continued to add these aircraft until delivery of a fifth aircraft in 2015. In January 2014, Flair acquired a VIP Embraer ERJ-175 and a VIP Dornier 328. Both were retired in September 2016. In June 2017, Flair announced it had purchased the assets of Manitoba-based discount travel company NewLeaf, of which it had been the operator of NewLeaf's flights, as it was not licensed as an airline. Flair retained 85% of former NewLeaf staff in the acquisition, and the NewLeaf brand was retired on July 25, 2017, with flights subsequently operated under the Flair name thereafter.

In late 2017, Flair Air rebranded as Flair Airlines, in which it unveiled a new magenta and blue livery, acquired additional aircraft, and announced plans to add more in 2018 and 2019. Two more 737-400s arrived at the airline in December 2017. In 2018, Flair moved its headquarters from Kelowna International Airport to Edmonton International Airport, and 777 Partners invested in Flair with the goal of building a Canadian low-fare carrier. In December 2018, Flair received three leased Boeing 737-800s. These were returned to lessor Smartwings in 2019 as a separately leased trio of 737-800s arrived at the airline.

=== 2019 rebranding–present ===
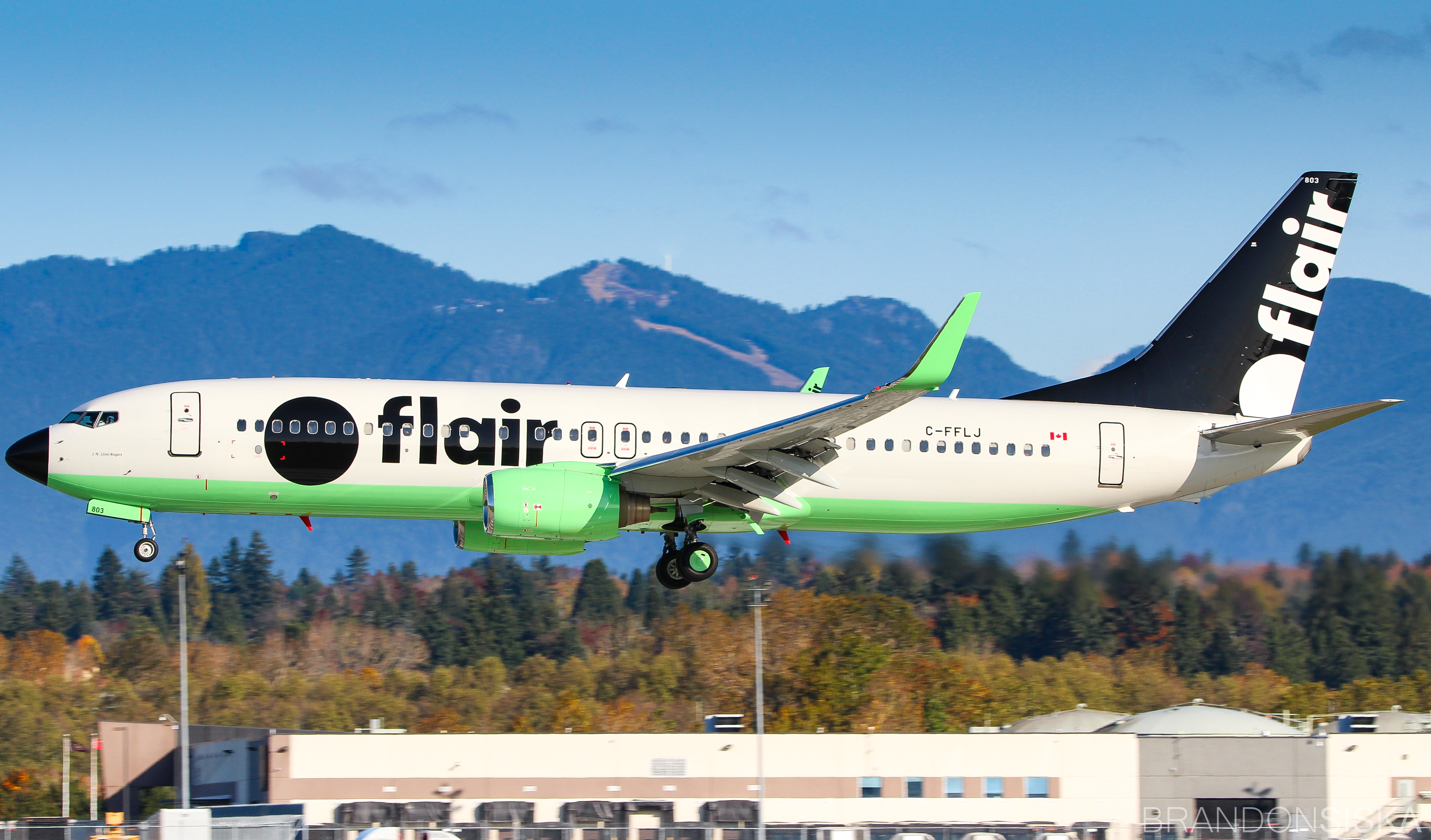
A Flair Airlines Boeing 737-800 in the 2019 livery

In February 2019, Flair went through a "top to bottom" makeover, changing its signature colours from purple and red to acid green and black. This reflected the airline's new "Plane and Simple" branding. The brand makeover included a new livery that remains on the airline's 737-800s. New flight attendant uniforms were also rolled out in September 2019.

In February 2020, Flair offered unlimited travel in the form of a one-time fee 90-day pass valid between February 13 and May 13, 2020. In August 2020, Flair retired their final Boeing 737-400 aircraft in response to the COVID-19 pandemic.

In January 2021, Flair announced an order for 13 of the MAX 8 variant Boeing 737 MAX jet from financing partner 777 Partners, with plans to grow to 50 aircraft within 5 years. The first of these aircraft arrived in May 2021, with a total of 8 scheduled to arrive over the summer months. The remaining five were planned to arrive before 2022. This order came at a crucial time for Boeing, as it restarted MAX operations following a months-long grounding of the type. All future aircraft deliveries to Flair were to be painted in an updated livery, which includes the airline's signature acid green and black colours, as well as subtle highlights of light purple. In December 2021, Flair ordered an additional 14 Boeing 737 MAX 8s.

==== Regulatory concerns ====
In March 2022, the Canadian Transportation Agency (CTA) ruled that Flair may be in violation of the law that requires it to be controlled by Canadians, and stated that the airline's operating licence may be suspended. Flair denied that it was in violation of Canadian laws and asked for an 18-month exemption to address regulatory concerns. Flair CEO Stephen Jones stated that the company would overhaul its board and refinance its debt to reduce foreign influence on the company. The National Airlines Council of Canada, which represents Air Canada, Air Transat, and WestJet released a statement asking the CTA to reject Flair's request. In a statement issued on April 21, Jones stated that the airline had a "zero chance" of losing its operating licence and criticized the lack of competition in the Canadian airline industry. On June 1, 2022, the CTA allowed Flair to keep its operating licence after concluding the airline is Canadian.

==== Passenger complaints ====
According to the Canadian Transportation Agency, Flair had the highest number of complaints per 100 flights of the major airlines in Canada, averaging 15.3 complaints per 100 flights over the period of April 1, 2022, to March 31, 2023. In comparison, the largest two airlines in Canada, Air Canada and WestJet, had 4.3 and 6.6 complaints per 100 flights, respectively.

The Canadian Transportation Agency again reported that Flair had the highest numbers of complaints in the first quarter of 2023, with 20.9 complaints per 100 flights. Low-cost leisure carrier Sunwing Airlines received the second most complaints, with 17.4 complaints per 100 flights, while low-cost carrier Lynx Air registered 5.2 complaints per 100 flights over the same period.

==== Aircraft seizures ====
On March 11, 2023, Airborne Capital Ltd. seized four of its planes operated by Flair over alleged non-payment. In a press conference, Jones suggested the seizures were motivated by competitors, and that the airline owed around US$1 million on the leases, and was in the process of making payment when the seizures occurred. The lessor, Airborne alleged that Flair had repeatedly missed payments amounting to several millions of dollars over a period of five months. Flair used other aircraft to continue to operate its schedule. In January 2024, it was reported that the lessors had filed claims at the UK High Court for costs and that there had been outstanding payments of $1.8 million on the four aircraft when notice of default was served.

== Destinations ==
This is a list of destinations that Flair Airlines has operated. It includes destinations served after the airline began scheduled flights in 2017 following the acquisition of Canadian travel company NewLeaf, but does not include or specify destinations served by charter flights that the airline mainly operated between 2005 and 2017.

=== Destinations ===
Countries served by Flair Airlines as of March 2026

Country	Province / state	City	Airport	Notes	Refs
Canada	Alberta	Calgary	Calgary International Airport	Base	
Canada	Alberta	Edmonton	Edmonton International Airport	Base	
Canada	British Columbia	Abbotsford	Abbotsford International Airport		
Canada	British Columbia	Kelowna	Kelowna International Airport		
Canada	British Columbia	Vancouver	Vancouver International Airport	Base	
Canada	British Columbia	Victoria	Victoria International Airport		
Canada	Manitoba	Winnipeg	Winnipeg James Armstrong Richardson International Airport	Base	
Canada	New Brunswick	Moncton	Greater Moncton Roméo LeBlanc International Airport	Seasonal	
Canada	New Brunswick	Saint John	Saint John Airport	Seasonal	
Canada	Newfoundland and Labrador	Deer Lake	Deer Lake Regional Airport	Seasonal	
Canada	Newfoundland and Labrador	St. John's	St. John's International Airport	Seasonal	
Canada	Nova Scotia	Halifax	Halifax Stanfield International Airport		
Canada	Ontario	Kitchener/ Waterloo	Region of Waterloo International Airport	Base	
Canada	Ontario	Thunder Bay	Thunder Bay International Airport	Seasonal	
Canada	Ontario	Toronto	Toronto Pearson International Airport	Base	
Canada	Ontario	Windsor	Windsor International Airport	Seasonal	
Canada	Prince Edward Island	Charlottetown	Charlottetown Airport	Seasonal	
Canada	Quebec	Montreal	Montréal–Trudeau International Airport	Seasonal	
Dominican Republic	La Altagracia	Punta Cana	Punta Cana International Airport	Seasonal	
Jamaica	Surrey County	Kingston	Norman Manley International Airport		
Jamaica	Cornwall County	Montego Bay	Sangster International Airport	Seasonal	
Mexico	–	Mexico City	Mexico City International Airport		
Mexico	Baja California Sur	San José del Cabo	Los Cabos International Airport	Seasonal	
Mexico	Guanajuato	Silao	Bajío International Airport		
Mexico	Jalisco	Guadalajara	Guadalajara International Airport		
Mexico	Jalisco	Puerto Vallarta	Licenciado Gustavo Díaz Ordaz International Airport	Seasonal	
Mexico	Quintana Roo	Cancún	Cancún International Airport		
United States	Arizona	Phoenix	Phoenix Sky Harbor International Airport	Seasonal	
United States	California	Los Angeles	Los Angeles International Airport		
United States	California	Palm Springs	Palm Springs International Airport	Seasonal	
United States	California	San Francisco	San Francisco International Airport		
United States	Florida	Fort Lauderdale	Fort Lauderdale–Hollywood International Airport		
United States	Florida	Orlando	Orlando International Airport	Seasonal	
United States	Nevada	Las Vegas	Harry Reid International Airport		
United States	New York	New York City	John F. Kennedy International Airport	Seasonal	
United States	Tennessee	Nashville	Nashville International Airport		

=== Terminated destinations ===
Country	Province/state	City	Airport	Notes	Refs
Canada	Alberta	Fort McMurray	Fort McMurray International Airport	Terminated	
Canada	Alberta	Grande Prairie	Grande Prairie Airport	Terminated	
Canada	British Columbia	Comox	Comox Valley Airport	Terminated	
Canada	British Columbia	Kamloops	Kamloops Airport	Terminated	
Canada	British Columbia	Prince George	Prince George Airport	Terminated	
Canada	Ontario	Hamilton	John C. Munro Hamilton International Airport	Terminated	
Canada	Ontario	London	London International Airport	Terminated	
Canada	Ontario	Ottawa	Macdonald-Cartier International Airport	Terminated	
Canada	Quebec	Quebec City	Québec City Jean Lesage International Airport	Terminated	
Canada	Saskatchewan	Regina	Regina International Airport	Terminated	
Canada	Saskatchewan	Saskatoon	Saskatoon International Airport	Terminated	
United States	Alaska	Anchorage	Ted Stevens Anchorage International Airport	Terminated	
United States	Arizona	Phoenix / Mesa	Phoenix–Mesa Gateway Airport	Terminated	
United States	Arizona	Tucson	Tucson International Airport	Terminated	
United States	California	Burbank	Hollywood Burbank Airport	Terminated	
United States	Colorado	Denver	Denver International Airport	Terminated	
United States	Florida	Miami	Miami International Airport	Terminated	
United States	Florida	Orlando / Sanford	Orlando Sanford International Airport	Terminated	
United States	Florida	St. Petersburg	St. Pete–Clearwater International Airport	Terminated	
United States	Illinois	Chicago	O'Hare International Airport	Terminated	

=== Interline agreements ===
According to iFly.com, Flair Airlines has codeshare agreements with Air Transat, KLM, and Air Europa.

== Charters ==
=== Workforce transportation ===
Between 2007 and 2010, Flair was the exclusive supplier of large aircraft to Shell Canada's project at Albian Sands. At its peak, the airline was moving over 10,000 construction workers per month from 14 points across Canada into Shell's project site, north of Fort McMurray, Alberta.

On October 7, 2013, Flair announced a ten-year agreement with Shell Energy Canada to provide air charter transportation services within Canada. Flair provided logistics planning, passenger reservations, and third-party charter aircraft procurement through a new subsidiary called North Sands Air Services.

=== Around the world tours ===
In September 2010, Flair was approached by an Ontario-based tour company to operate a world tour program to 14 countries. Flair reconfigured one of its Boeing 737-400s from 158 economy class seats to 76 business class seats.

In 2011, Flair operated another world tour to 14 new destinations.

In October 2013, Flair operated a South American tour to 10 destinations.

=== Government charters ===
Flair has provided ongoing personnel movement for the Department of National Defence and other departments of the Canadian federal government.

=== ACMI charters ===
Flair also offers aircraft, complete crew, maintenance, and insurance (ACMI) charters which provide customers with a 'turn-key' aircraft package.

=== Passenger charters ===
Flair used to operate flights on behalf of other Canadian airlines, such as Air Transat.

== Fleet ==
=== Current fleet ===
As of July 1, 2026, Flair Airlines has an all-Boeing 737 fleet of the following aircraft registered with Transport Canada (TC):

Flair Airlines fleet
Aircraft	In service	Orders	Passengers	Notes
Boeing 737-800	2	—	186	
Boeing 737 MAX 8	18	—	189	
Total	20	—		

On March 11, 2023, the fleet size was reduced by four Boeing 737s (one 737-800 and three 737 MAX 8) due to seizure by the aircraft lessor.

Flair announced in 2021 they would aim to operate 50 aircraft by 2025. In 2023, this goal was officially pushed back to the end of 2027. Flair has not acquired any new aircraft since June 2023, and it is unclear how, when, or where they will acquire these aircraft, or whether this goal is still active.

=== Former fleet ===
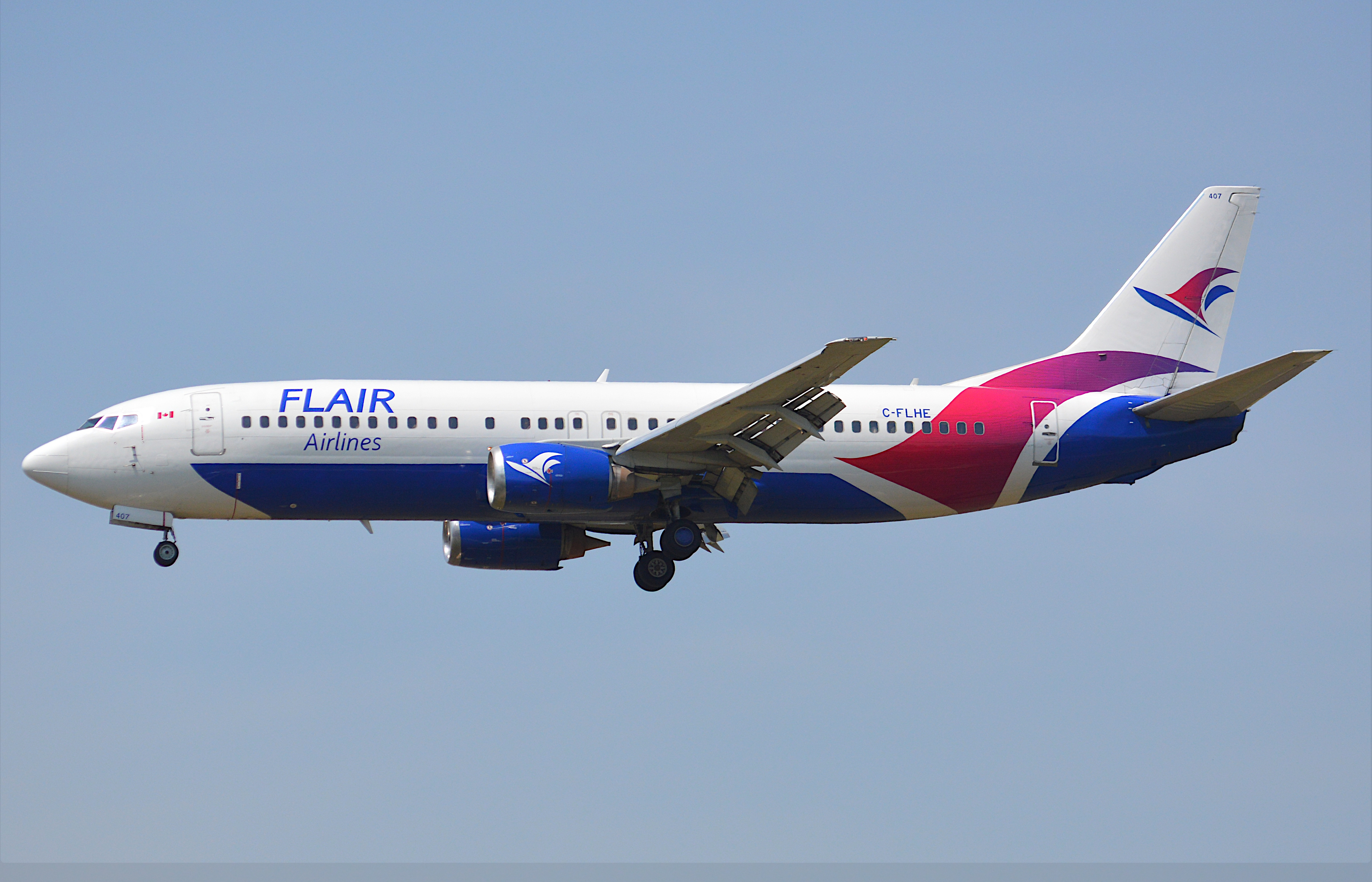
A former Flair Airlines Boeing 737-400 in the 2017–2019 livery

Flair Airlines has previously operated the following aircraft types:

Flair Airlines former fleet
Aircraft	Total	Introduced	Retired
Boeing 727-200	2	2005	2010
Boeing 737-400	8	2008	2020
Cessna 340	1	2009	2015
Dornier 328	1	2014	2016
Embraer 175	1	2014	2016

== Cabin and services ==
Flair's aircraft are configured with 186 or 189 economy class seats in a 3–3 layout. The airline charges additional fees for various services and amenities, including additional baggage allowances and in-flight catering. Flair does not offer in-flight entertainment or in-flight internet access (Wi-Fi).
