= Southern Skyways =

- Founded: 1980; 45 years ago
- Fleet size: Varies Between; Operating Airline
- Destinations: 10
- Parent company: Aviation Advantage, Inc.
- Headquarters: Atlanta, Georgia
- Key people: Kent Elsbree (CEO) [Aviation Advantage]
- Website: www.southernskyways.com

Southern Skyways is a virtual airline which markets air travel branding and is based in Atlanta, Georgia, USA. Southern Skyways is operated by and is a division of an Aviation Advantage, Inc., which is based also out of Atlanta, Georgia.

Aviation Advantage, Inc. / Southern Skyways primarily uses the certificated airline carrier lease charter services of:

- AirTran Airways
- Xtra Airways
- Swift Air
- USA Jet Airlines

Southern Skyways focuses on both domestic and international air service operations.

== Destinations ==
=== United States ===
==== Georgia ====
- Atlanta (Hartsfield-Jackson Atlanta International Airport)

==== Mississippi ====
- Gulfport (Gulfport-Biloxi International Airport

== See also ==
- List of defunct airlines of the United States
