= Söder Airlines =

Virtual Finnish airline

Söder Aviation
IATA	ICAO	Call sign
OY	SDE	Söder
- Commenced operations: 2003
- Ceased operations: 2005
- Operating bases: Tampere-Pirkkala Airport; Helsinki-Vantaa Airport
- Fleet size: 1 McDonnell Douglas MD-82
- Destinations: See Services below
- Headquarters: Tampere, Finland
- Key people: Tapani Yli-Saunamäki (CEO)

Söder Aviation Oy (Söder Airlines) is a defunct Finnish airline, virtual airline and internet booking agency based in Tampere, Finland. Its CEO was Tapani Yli-Saunamäki. Its main base was at Tampere-Pirkkala Airport (TMP), Tampere. An additional base was established in early 2006 at Helsinki-Vantaa International Airport, since there were no routes to or from Tampere at that time.

== History ==
The airline was established and started operations in 2003 as Söder Air. The company operated a single 50-seat Saab 2000 turboprop aircraft. It suspended operations after Saab Group terminated its lease, but restarted in February 2005 under a new name, Söder Aviation Oy (Ltd) using one MD-82 wet-leased from Bulgarian Air Charter and operated by Aviapaslauga from Lithuania and one aircraft operated by a Swedish company Nextjet. Söder Airlines previous operator's license was cancelled by CAA of Finland. The charter company status was revoked by the Finnish Consumer Agency due to lack of collateral required. The company ceased scheduled flights in May 2005.

For the spring skiing season of 2006, Söder Aviation started selling tickets for three weekly flights from Helsinki to Kittilä and back. Flights were to be operated by Alexandair (of Greece), airline code AXN, between February 18 and May 1, 2006 using an ex-Austrian Airlines MD-81, SX-BMP. However, only some 3 initial return flights between Helsinki and Kittilä by operator Alexandair were actually flown and further flights cancelled for undisclosed reasons. On March 11, 2006, Söder Aviation Ltd publicly announced plans to sell tickets for the Helsinki-Kittilä route using a semi-convertible 40-seat An-72 cargo aircraft, which was to be operated by Enimex of Estonia. This plan was immediately rejected by the CAA of Finland due to the CAA's understanding that the type certificate of this An-72 did not allow for scheduled passenger flights in Finnish airspace. After this decision by the Finnish Civil Aviation Authority, Söder Aviation cancelled all planned flights for the rest of the spring skiing season.

Due to previous officially published debts (amounting to approximately Euro 1 million), the Finnish financial authorities seized a substantial amount of funds from 2 Söder Aviation bank accounts in early March, which placed the company in a difficult financial position. On April 4, 2006, Söder Aviation Ltd. filed for bankruptcy at Helsinki District Court. The court approved the start of bankruptcy on April 7.

== Services ==
The airline flew routes from Tampere to Kittilä, Ivalo, and Oulu and from Helsinki to Kittilä and Ivalo directly or via Tampere during the winter skiing seasons. International flights originally planned did not materialize. In 2006, the only planned route (operated by Alexandair) was Helsinki-Kittilä, originally scheduled to last until May 1 (the end of the Finnish skiing season).
