= Air Poland =

Polish charter airline

IATA	ICAO	Call sign
-	AEI	POLISH BIRD
- Founded: 2007
- Ceased operations: 2012
- Operating bases: Warsaw Frederic Chopin Airport
- Fleet size: 3
- Destinations: 15
- Parent company: Mariusz Szpikowski and Dariusz Paszke
- Headquarters: Warsaw, Poland
- Website: www.flyairpoland.com

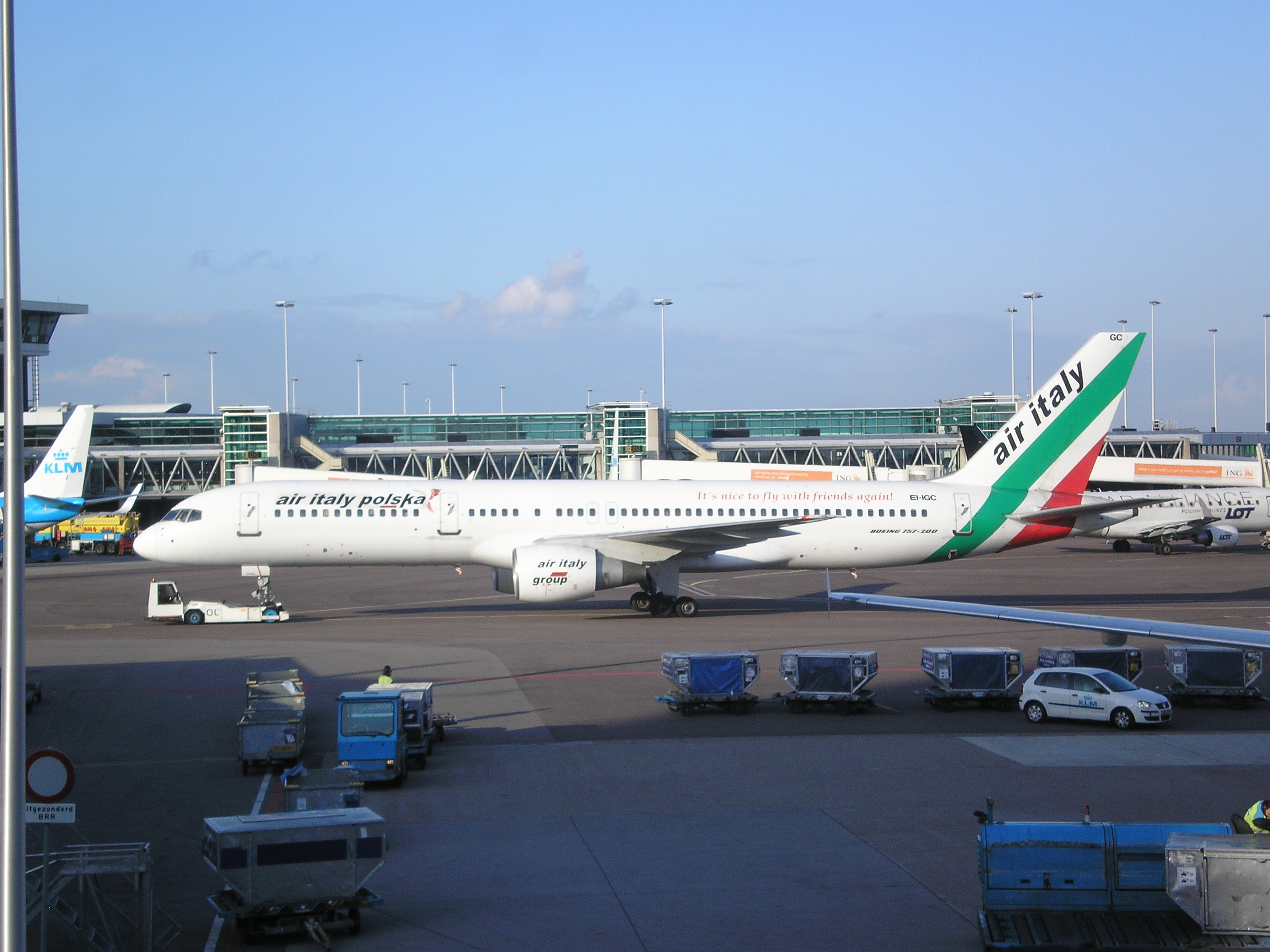
A Boeing 757-200 at Amsterdam Airport Schiphol in 2009.

Air Poland Sp. z o.o. (formerly Air Italy Polska Sp. z o.o.) was a charter airline founded in 2007 and was based in Warsaw, Poland. A former subsidiary of Air Italy, it operated charter flights on behalf of Polish tour operators to a broad range of destinations across the Mediterranean region, the Caribbean and beach resorts in Thailand and India. Most flights departed from either Warsaw Frederic Chopin Airport, Katowice International Airport or Poznań-Ławica Airport.

Air Poland ceased all operations and filed for bankruptcy in April 2012.

== History ==
In April 2011 Air Italy Polska rebranded to Air Poland. It was not a part of the Air Italy Group anymore. The last owners were Mariusz Szpikowski and Dariusz Paszke.

== Destinations ==
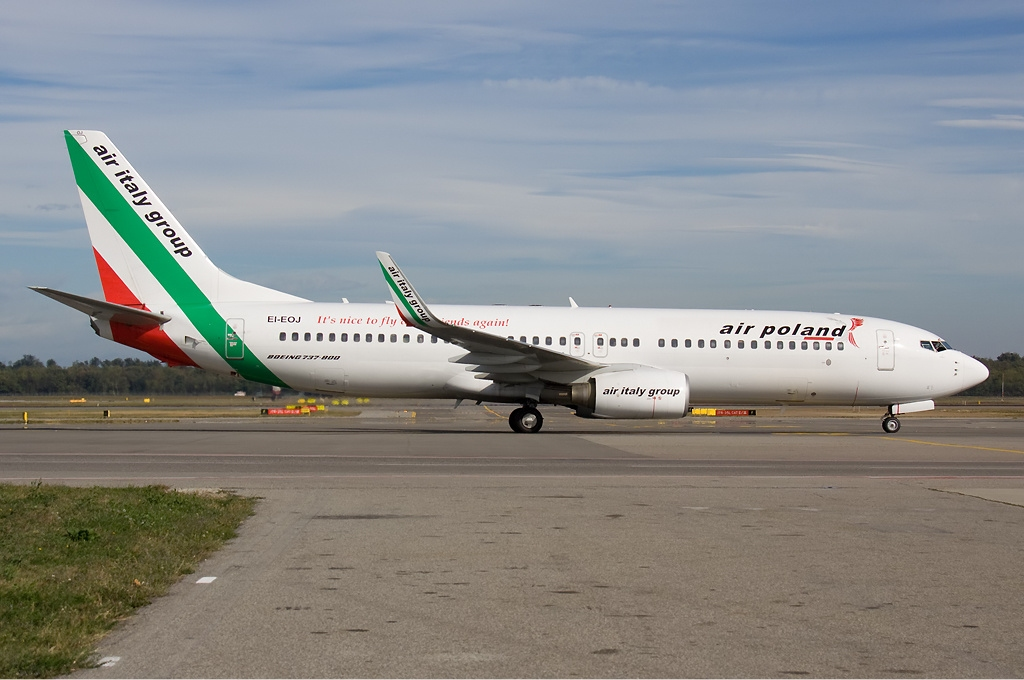
An Air Poland Boeing 737-800.

Air Poland operated charter flights to leisure destinations in the following countries:

- Summer schedule:
  - Turkey
  - Greece
  - Egypt
  - Tunisia
  - Spain
  - Italy
  - Portugal
  - Morocco
- Winter schedule:
  - Caribbean Islands
  - Southeast Asia
  - South America

In 2011 FlyCentralEurope announced in-cooperation with Air Italy and Hamilton (ON) airport, it will be offering new service from Hamilton to Budapest, Kraków and Prague, on board Air Italy's Boeing 767-200ER aircraft. In addition, the tour operator also chartered Air Italy for 2 weekly Chicago – Kraków service. The Boeing 767-200ER would have been transferred to Air Italy Polska. These flights never took off and were cancelled as of 19 May 2011.
