= Virtual airline (economics) =

Airline that has heavily outsourced functions

In economics, a virtual airline is an airline that has outsourced as many possible operational and business functions as it can, but still maintains effective control of its core business. Such an airline focuses on operating a network of air services, and outsourcing non-core activities to other organizations. Contracting out services within the aviation industry has reportedly become so common that many carriers could be classed as having features of a virtual airline, although it is arguable whether any current carriers meet a strict definition of the term.

The term is often used to describe travel companies and ticket agencies that market themselves as airlines, but do not possess an air operator's certificate and contract with one or more certificated operators to fly and maintain aircraft, often under an air charter or wet lease arrangement. Although operated by others from a regulatory standpoint, the aircraft may display the virtual airline's livery, and may be owned or leased by that company.

== Origins ==
Virtual airlines originated in the United States following the drastic changes brought about by the Airline Deregulation Act of 1978. During the hyper-competitive years immediately following deregulation, major airlines found it increasingly unprofitable to compete against start-up carriers on many routes they currently served. Instead of forfeiting the routes entirely, the larger carriers often made marketing arrangements with smaller airlines to fly under the "banner", or livery, of the larger airline. These regional airlines, mimicking the well known major airlines in adverts and purporting to make connections as seamless as possible, soon abandoned their own local service routes. In most cases, the regional airlines found it more profitable to serve the mainline hubs as a feeder operation rather than operate on their own.

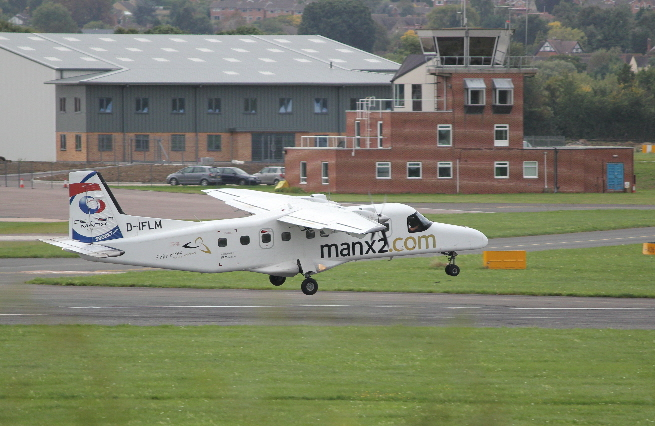
A Dornier 228 with the livery of virtual airline Manx2; the aircraft was actually operated by FLM Aviation, with Manx2 being a ticket broker.

== List of virtual airlines ==
=== Africa ===
- Cally Air
- FlyNamibia
- Lift
- Air Ghana

=== Europe ===
- Air Croatia (defunct)
- Air Leap (defunct)
- Air Norway (defunct)
- Air Prishtina
- AirGotland (defunct)
- AirSeven
- Alpeflyet (defunct)
- Alsie Express
- AnadoluJet
- Andorra Airlines
- Arctic Airlink (defunct)
- BRA Braathens Regional Airlines
- Citywing (defunct)
- Color Air (defunct)
- CU Airlines
- Evolavia (defunct)
- Fly Kıbrıs Airlines
- Fly Marche (defunct)
- flyBAIR
- FlyNonstop (defunct)
- Global Airlines (defunct)
- Global Reach Aviation
- Green Airlines (defunct)
- IGavion (defunct)
- Jetisfaction (defunct)
- Kosova Airlines (defunct)
- Krohn Air (defunct)
- L'odyssey
- Level
- Lübeck Air (defunct)
- Manx2 (defunct)
- MeerExpress (defunct)
- Melilla Airlines (defunct)
- MSC Air Cargo
- MyWings
- Niceair (defunct)
- Oenia Airlines
- Portugália Airlines (defunct)
- Rhein-Neckar Air (defunct)
- Sky Greenland (defunct)
- SkyAlps
- Skåneflyg (defunct)
- Snowbird Airlines (defunct)
- Soder Airlines (defunct)
- Spanjet (defunct)
- Sveaflyg (defunct)
- Sverigeflyg (defunct)
- Teddy Air (defunct)
- Trawel Fly (defunct)
- UEP!Fly
- Vildanden (defunct)
- Vizion Air
- Västflyg

=== North America ===
==== With mainline-type equipment ====
- Aeroflyer
- Amazon Air
- Cal Jet Air (defunct)
- Direct Air (defunct)
- Greyhound Air (defunct)
- Hooters Air (defunct)
- Midwest (defunct)
- OWG (defunct)
- Peoplexpress (defunct)
- Red Way (defunct)
- Roots Air (defunct)
- Sky Cana (defunct)
- SkyValue (defunct)
- Tahoe Air (defunct)
- Western (defunct)

==== With regional-type equipment ====
- Air Canada Express
- Aleutian Airways
- American Eagle
- Blade
- Branson Air Express (defunct)
- Buzz (defunct)
- Chalk's Ocean Airways (Post Flight 101) (defunct)
- Delta Connection
- Delta Shuttle
- FLOAT Shuttle
- Go! (defunct)
- Go!Express (defunct)
- JSX
- NewLeaf (defunct)
- OneJet (defunct)
- Ravn Connect (defunct)
- Southern Skyways
- Taos Air (defunct)
- Ultimate Air Shuttle (defunct)
- United Express
