= Vildanden (airline) =

Former Norwegian airline

IATA	ICAO	Call sign
2Q	-	-
- Founded: 23 November 2004
- Ceased operations: 16 January 2011
- Hubs: Skien Airport, Geiteryggen
- Fleet size: 2
- Destinations: 3
- Headquarters: Skien, Norway
- Key people: Tore Sundvor (chair)
- Website: http://www.vildanden.no

Vildanden AS ("The Wild Duck") was a virtual, regional airline based at Skien Airport, Geiteryggen in Norway, where it was the only airline. With operations starting in 2005, it flew to Bergen, Trondheim and Stavanger using a Jetstream 32 and an ATR 42, which is wet leased from Danish Air Transport (DAT) and Helitrans. Previously, the airline has also served Stockholm and Molde, and has also operated Saab 340 aircraft, operated by Coast Air, Air Aurora and Avitrans. The airline had been in conflict with Coast Air about terminating the wet lease agreement. The company has had to be bailed out several times, including by the municipality, until it managed to make its first profit in 2009. It ceased operations and filed for bankruptcy in January 2011.

== Operation ==
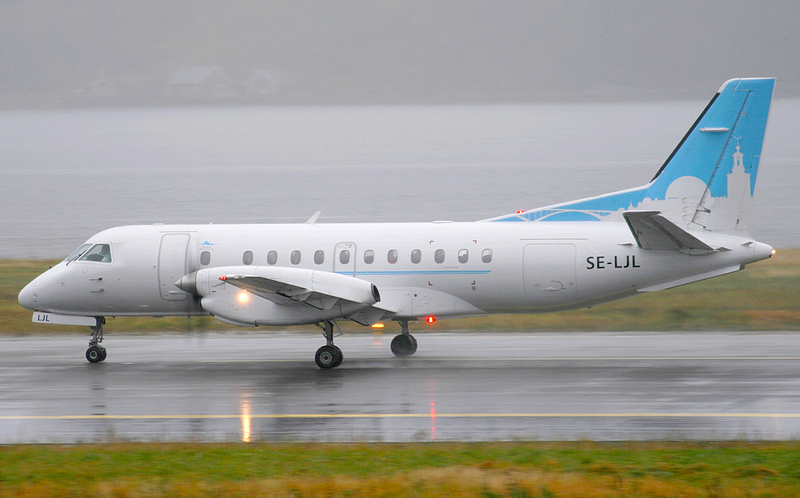
Vildanden Saab 340

The airline was based at Skien Airport, Geiteryggen. It provides twenty weekly trips to Bergen and weekly trips to Stavanger. In 2009, 50,000 people traveled with Vildanden. The company has one ATR 42, which seats 48 passengers and is operated by Danish Air Transport, and one Jetstream 32, which seats 19 and is operated by Helitrans. The airline used Sandefjord Airport, Torp as its reserve airport in case of bad weather. The airline is named after the play The Wild Duck (Norwegian: Vildanden) written by Henrik Ibsen, who was born in Skien. The slogan "The shortest path between Ibsen and Grieg" is a pun on the Bergen composer Edvard Grieg's and Ibsen's names. The largest owner is Magne Forland, who owns 70%.

== Destinations ==
Map of Vildanden's routes

The following list shows all current and former destinations, including the city served, the country, the airport (with IATA airport codes and ICAO airport codes), and the begin and end year of the service.

City	Country	IATA	ICAO	Airport	Begin	End
Bergen	Norway	BGO	ENBR	Bergen Airport, Flesland	2005	2011
Skien	Norway	SKE	ENSN	Skien Airport, Geiteryggen^{†}	2005	2011
Stavanger	Norway	SVG	ENZV	Stavanger Airport, Sola	2005	2011

== History ==
=== Establishment ===
Vildanden was founded on 23 November 2004 by 18 local investors who wanted to start commercial scheduled flights from Skien Airport, Geiteryggen. For a long period, there had been a public debate about closing the airport. Owned by the municipality, the airport was receiving annual subsidies of NOK 2.5 million from the municipality, and NOK 3.8 million from the state. It was decided to operate Vildanden as a virtual airline (one that owns none of its equipment, leasing everything from others), and wet lease operations from other companies. Initial plans had been started in 2003 to cooperate with Dutch airline Denim Air, with a 50-seater aircraft, but these plans did not work out.

In October 2004, a contract was signed with Haugesund-based Coast Air, who would operate Jetstream 31 aircraft between Skien and Bergen. The owner of Coast Air, Kystfly, also bought 20% of Vildanden. Coast Air had previously operated routes from Skien to Western Norway, but had withdrawn in 1999. Following the announcement from Vildanden and Coast Air, the municipality decided to not close the airport, and cover the estimated NOK 300,000 annual deficit, as well as upgrade the control tower for NOK 700,000. The airport had been closed since 2002, following the increased domestic and international traffic from near-by Sandefjord Airport, Torp.

Initial service would have 16 weekly departures to Bergen Airport, Flesland. The main market segment is the offshore petroleum industry, and the departure times were designed to mesh with helicopter routes to offshore installations. The company estimated that one-quarter of travellers would be people commuting to the North Sea. Norsk Hydro, who have a lot of employees in the Grenland area, stated that they could not start using Vildanden because they had an agreement with SAS Braathens' services from Sandefjord. The first scheduled service flew on 24 January 2005, carrying eight passengers. This first month, 972 passengers took the plane, and Vildanden announced that they would try to also start a route to Stavanger Airport, Sola, as well as potentially to Oslo Airport, Gardermoen.

=== DAT in, Coast Air out ===
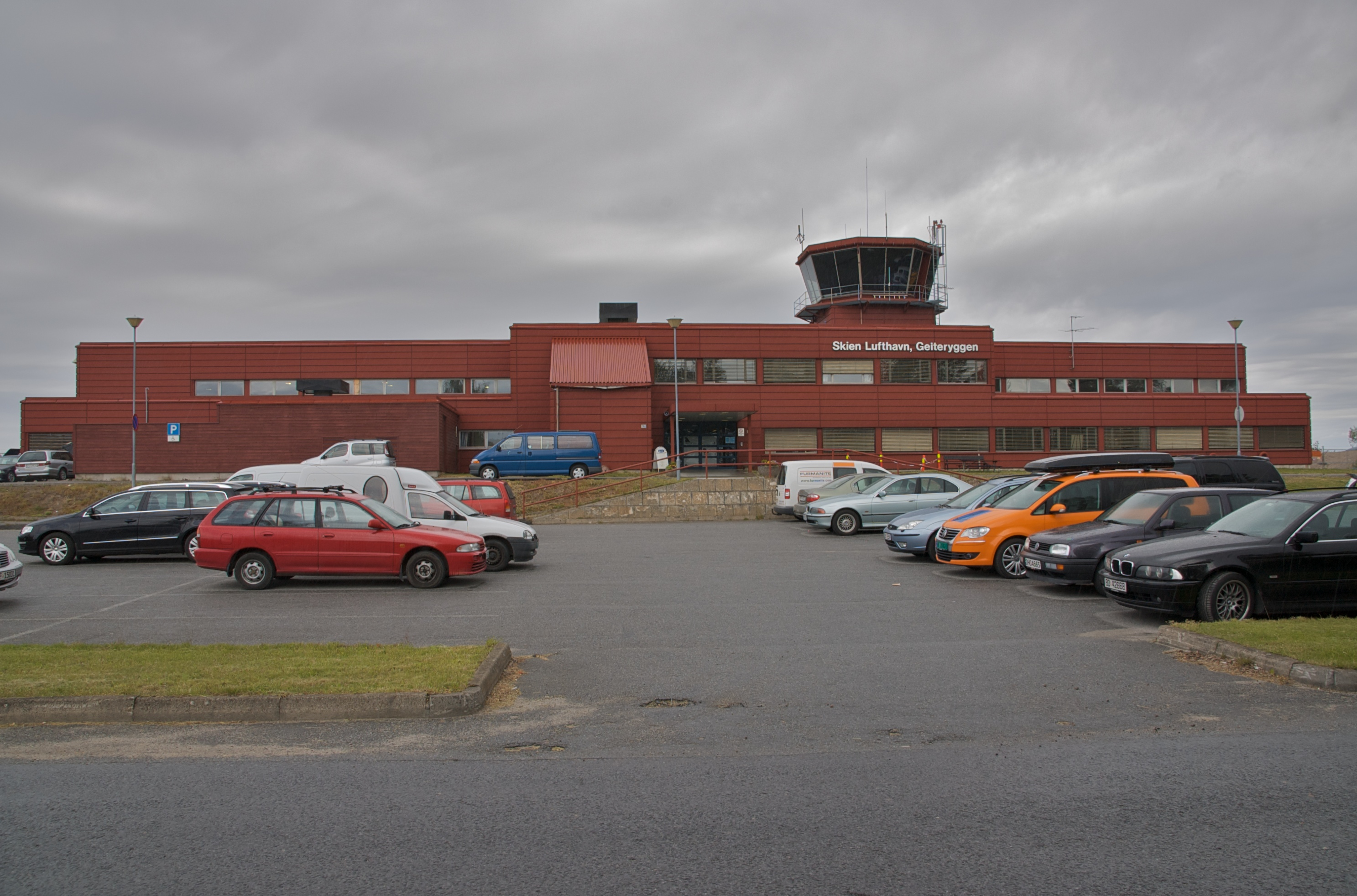
Vildanden is based at Skien Airport, Geiteryggen

On 19 April, a new Jetstream 32 aircraft was taken into service. This allowed capacity to increase from 12 to 19 passengers, and at the same time travel time was reduced from 47 to 39 minutes. By September, the most popular departures were being booked full, and Vildanden asked Coast Air for a larger aircraft, with about 30 seats. In addition to allowing more passengers, larger planes would give higher comfort, and allow a more flexible ticket pricing scheme. An agreement with Danish Air Transport (DAT) to operate an ATR 42, with a capacity of 48 seats, was signed in mid-October.

To be able to breach the agreement with Coast Air—who still had a wet leasing contract, but were not able to put into operation a larger aircraft—the company Skien Lufttransport AS was created, and it purchased all the revenue and passenger rights from Vildanden. At the same time, it became the legal counterpart for DAT. The new aircraft was put into service on 31 October, branded with the Vildanden logo. Coast Air chose to continue operating the route between Bergen and Skien in their own name, and used the same aircraft and slot times. At Skien Airport, the Vildanden passengers were given the choice between Coast Air and Vildanden, and all nineteen chose Vildanden. On the return flight, three passengers chose each airline. Both aircraft flew to Skien, but due to heavy rain, only the aircraft from DAT was able to land. The passengers who had taken the Coast Air aircraft, were forced to land at Sandefjord Airport instead.

The following day, Coast Air terminated their flights, but stated that they still had an agreement with Vildanden. Skien Lufttransport on their hand stated that Vildanden was now a sleeping company, and that the contract therefore was terminated. Both companies considered the incident a legal matter. In December, the two companies settled outside court.

At the same time, the municipal council was considering the future of the airport. The city engineer estimated it would need a subsidy of NOK 2 million in 2006, and the politicians, who wanted the airport to run without subsidies, demanded that Vildanden guarantee for the deficit. This was rejected by Vildanden—on the contrary, the company was in dire need for more capital, and issued a private placement for NOK 4 million in December 2005. The company had since the start been losing money, and needed extra capital to get through the rough until it could make an operating profit. After the placement, 15% of the company was owned by DAT, while Coast Air sold their shares. In 2005, Vildanden had a revenue of NOK 15 million.

=== More operators ===
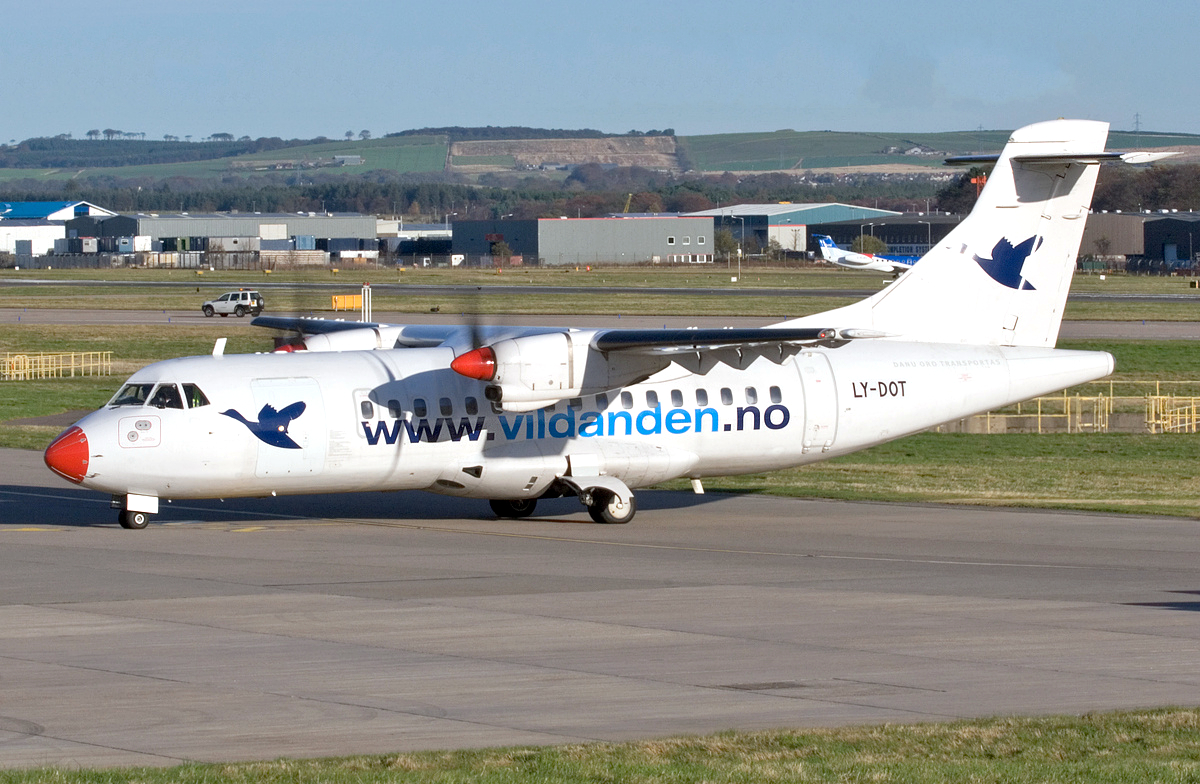
Danu Oro Transportas-operated ATR-42 at Aberdeen Airport in 2005

During 2006, the ridership increased, and Vildanden started becoming more aggressive against Widerøe, which was flying to Bergen from Sandefjord Airport. Vildanden stated that they aimed to outperform Widerøe on price to Bergen. The ATR-42 turned out to be too large; from 1 July, operations was taken over by the Czech company Air Aurora, with a smaller 30-seater Saab 340. This reduced the monthly leasing costs from NOK 700,000 to NOK 550,000. DAT remained responsible for the booking system.

In October, an agreement was signed with the Avitrans of Sweden to take over operations. This also included a second aircraft, so the airline could start operations to Stavanger and Molde in 2007. From 18 March, Vildanden also started three weekly departures from Skien to Stockholm-Skavsta Airport. The route was necessary to transport personnel from Avitrans' hub at Bromma to Skien.

=== Troubled times ===
By October 2007, Vildanden was in severe financial distress. An agreement was made with the municipal council, where the latter gave a credit loan to the airline. The route to Molde had given large deficits, and the company was forced to close it down. NOK 2.3 million, equal to the airlines debt to the airport, was granted to the municipal-owned airport operator, and the company allowed to make an agreement where half the debt was deleted, and the other half made interest and principal-free for two years. At the same time, the management of Vildanden had to raise new capital equal to at least half the companies accounts payable, which was NOK 8 million. The case raised local debate about whether it was the municipality's job to subsidize the airport and the airline. The Federation of Norwegian Aviation Industries announced that they would consider reporting the subsidies to the EFTA Surveillance Authority (ESA) for violation of the European Community competition law.

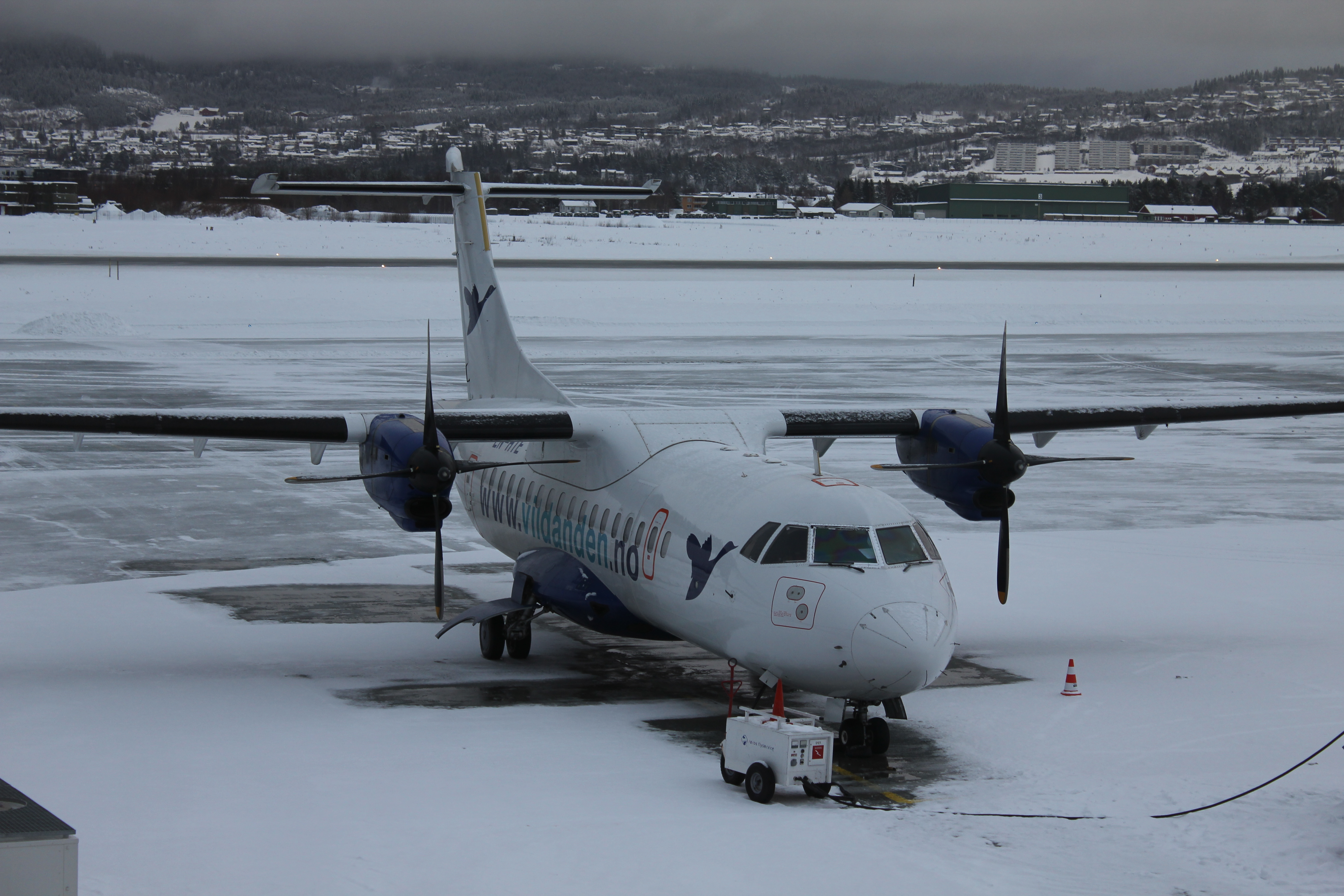
Vildanden ATR-42 at Trondheim Airport, Værnes

The fiscal year 2007 gave a revenue of NOK 61 million, and a deficit of NOK 13 million. During the airport strike in May 2008—which closed Bergen Airport—Vildanden had full planes since they could land them on the short runway at near-by Stord Airport, Sørstokken. In 2008, 50,000 people used Skien Airport, most of whom flew with Vildanden.

On 19 June 2008, the municipal council voted to not give further subsidies to the airport. Upgrades for NOK 8 million were needed to meed safety standard. The airport operator had debt of NOK 12 million, and no realizeable assets. Vildanden was under certain conditions willing to pay some of the capital needed to perform the upgrades. The municipal council changed their opinion and voted—with a single decisive vote—to keep the airport running in July. The financial risk would be taken over by the municipal-owned Kontorbygg, who operate a range of offices and commercial buildings in Skien. The proposal was supported by the right-winged parties, and opposed by the socialist parties, as well as the chair of Kontorbygg. As a response, the Federation of Norwegian Aviation Industries reported the municipality to ESA, and demanded that NOK 20 million in illegal subsidies be repaid by Vildanden and the airport operator.

The company had a loss of NOK 3.4 million in 2008. In April 2009, Vildanden terminated its agreement with Aviatrans with the intention of using larger aircraft. In July, an agreement was made with DAT to operate an ATR-42 on the Bergen route. From 1 August, the Stockholm route was terminated. The company stated that they had been considering having a stop-over at Moss Airport, Rygge on the Stockholm flights, but instead decided to terminate the route.

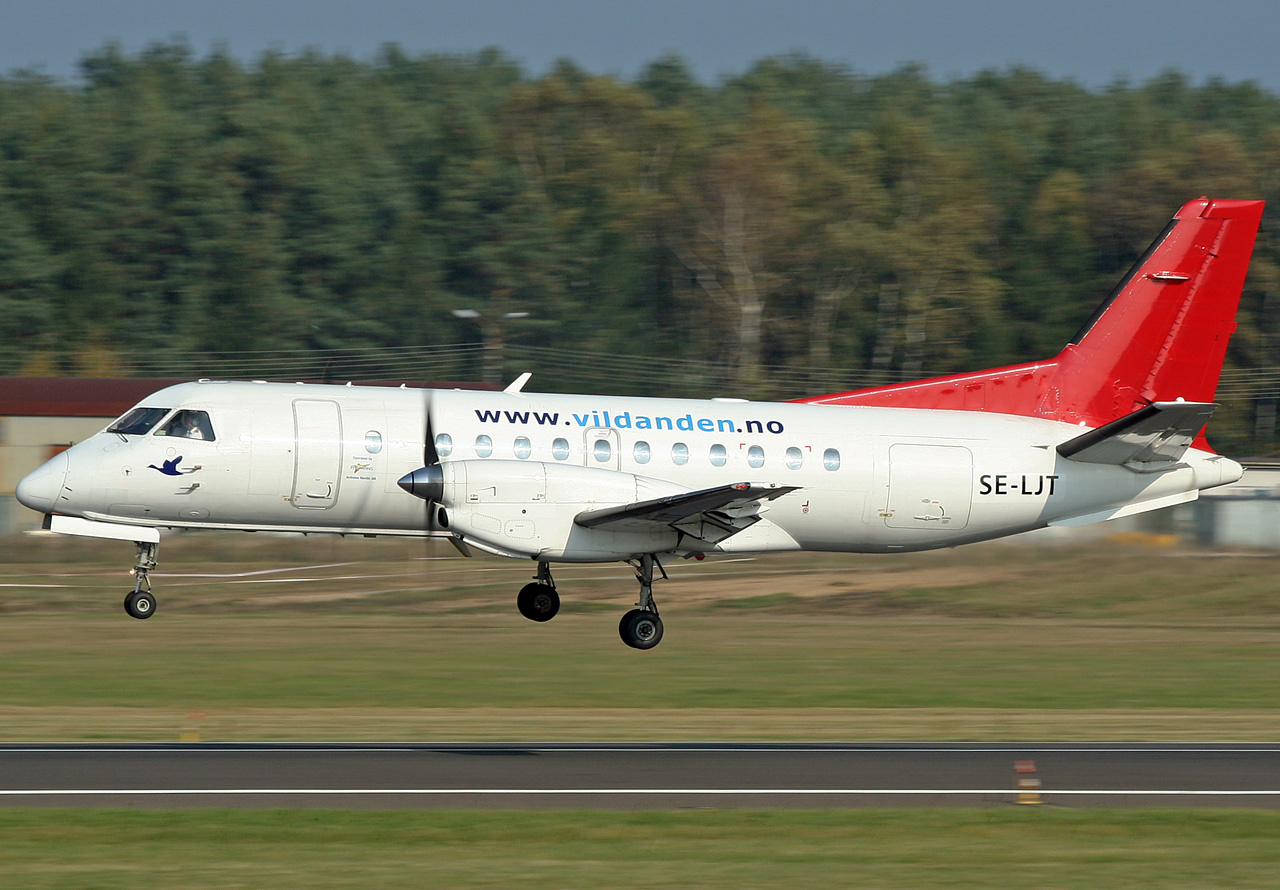
Saab 340 operated by Avitrans in 2007

During the winter of 2008–09, Vildanden was forced to land at Sandefjord Airport 50 times due to weather closing Geiteryggen. In March, Widerøe started a marketing campaign to attract people from Grenland to use their routes at Torp. Local Liberal Party politician Gustav Søvde stated that he was opposed to Widerøe advertising in the Telemark press for their services. At the same time, Asbjørn Anthonisen, previous chief of operations in Malmö Aviation, was hired as new CEO.

Magne Forland increased his ownership in the company to 70% in August, after he had previously given NOK 10.5 million in interest-free loans to the company. On 11 November 2009, the German pilots on a flight from Skien to Bergen announced that only 28 of the passengers, without baggage, could take the ride. The reason was bad weather, which was described as "normal Norwegian rain" by the airline afterwards. This caused several commuters to miss their connecting flights on helicopters to offshore installations. The airline later stated that it was caused by the pilots not being aware of the safety equipment installed at Geiteryggen.

In December 2009, Vildanden announced it plans to operate routes to Trondheim Airport, Værnes, but lacks financial maneuverability to commence operations. By October 2009, Vildanden owed Kontorbygg, the operator of Geiteryggen, NOK 1.5 million in airport fees. Kontorbygg stated that if Vildanden did not pay, the airport would have to file for bankruptcy. Innovation Norway rejected to give Vildanden a loan for NOK 3.5 million in December 2009. Kontorbygg stated that the operation of Geiteryggen had cost the municipality NOK 50 million in the course of the five years Vildanden had been operating from it. In February 2010, the Municipality of Skien announced that it required Vildanden to pay back the NOK 3.1 million, plus NOK 200,000 in interest, that they borrowed in 2007. The loan was renewed in March, after Vildanden paid NOK 385,000. From 16 August, Helitrans took over as the operator, using an ATR 42. From 6 September, the company started with flights to Trondheim. The company ceased operations after its last flight on 14 January 2011.
