= Direct Fly =

Polish regional airline

IATA	ICAO	Call sign
-	SXP	EXPRESS SKY
- Founded: 2005
- Ceased operations: 2007
- Operating bases: Wrocław Airport; Warsaw Frederic Chopin Airport; Gdańsk Lech Wałęsa Airport; John Paul II International Airport Kraków-Balice
- Fleet size: 3
- Destinations: 7
- Headquarters: Warsaw, Poland
- Key people: Jan Szczepkowski (ceo)
- Website: http://www.directfly.pl/

Direct Fly was a regional airline based in Warsaw, Poland. It operated domestic services. Its main base was Warsaw Frederic Chopin Airport.

== History ==
The airline started operations on 12 April 2006.

In May 2008 the company gave birth to a new airline called SprintAir that flies night airmail and small parcels using 2 of its former aircraft converted into cargo and adding another one of the same type to its fleet.

== Destinations ==
As of March 2007, Direct Fly operated scheduled domestic flights to the following destinations:

- Warsaw-Chopin Airport
- Gdańsk Lech Wałęsa Airport
- Wrocław Airport
- Kraków John Paul II International Airport

Initially, the airline had been flying to Łódź, Bydgoszcz, Berlin-Schönefeld, Copenhagen, Kyiv and Lwów. After two months of operation, it eliminated all of its international routes and more than half of the domestic ones.

== Fleet ==
The Direct Fly fleet included the following aircraft:

- 2 Saab 340A
