= SprintAir =

Polish airline

Coordinates: 52.1751°N 20.9470°E

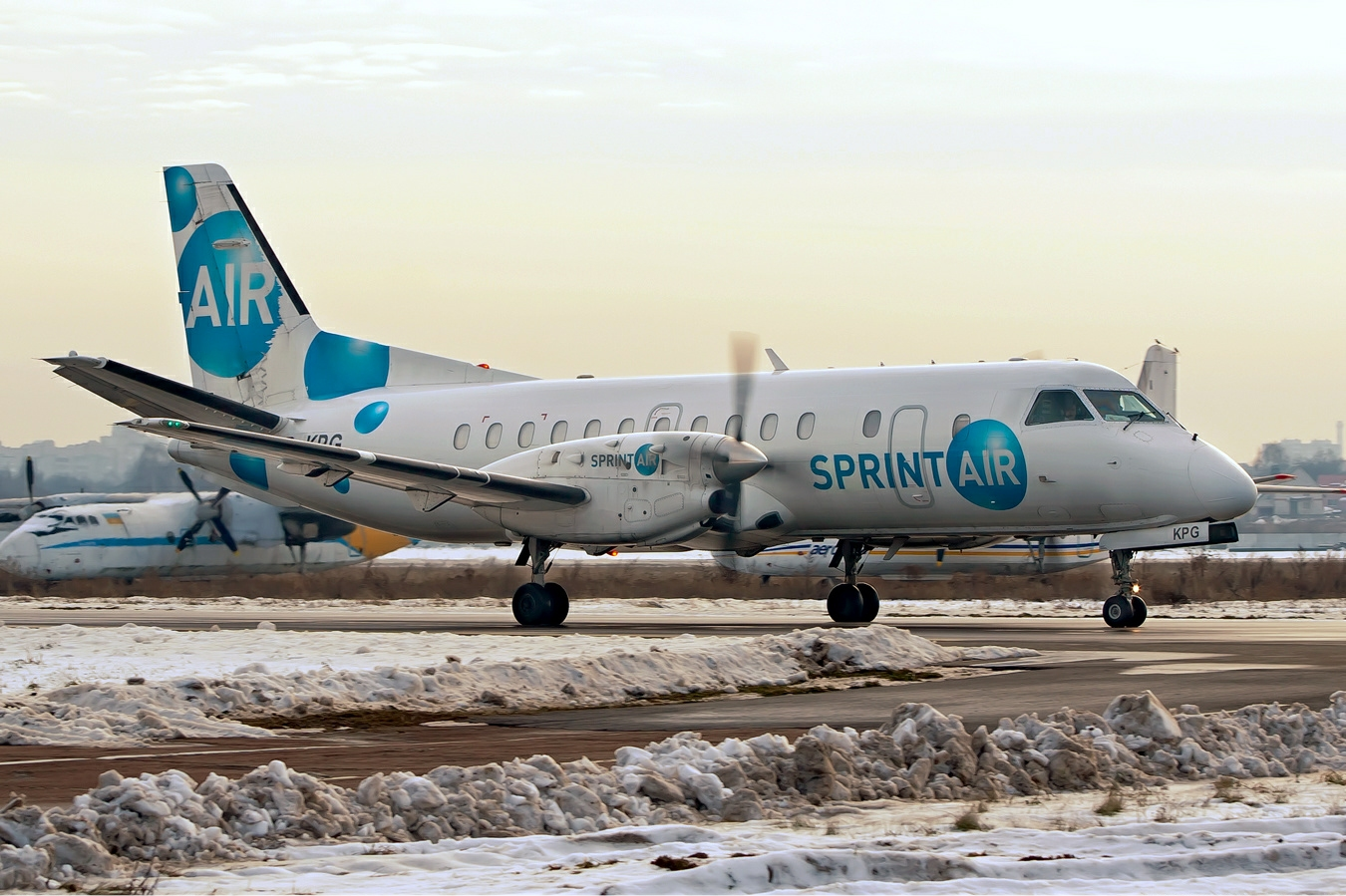
IATA	ICAO	Call sign
P8	SRN	SPRINTAIR
- Founded: 2007
- Operating bases: Warsaw Chopin Airport
- Fleet size: 17
- Destinations: 15
- Headquarters: Warsaw, Poland
- Key people: Katarzyna Szczepkowska (CEO)
- Website: www.sprintair.eu

SprintAir S.A. is a Polish airline headquartered in Warsaw and based at Warsaw Frederic Chopin Airport. It operates cargo services and passenger charter flights.

== History ==
The airline was set up in 2002 under the name of Air Polonia Cargo Sp. z o.o. It started freight and mail flights in April 2004, with three Let L-410 UVP-E aircraft. Later that year the airline was renamed to Sky Express Sp. z o.o. and acquired its first Saab 340A turboprops (SP-KPF and SP-KPE - the first Saab 340s to be entered into the Polish Aircraft Register). Between April 2006 and April 2007 it started scheduled domestic passenger operations under the Direct Fly brand. After the suspension of regular passenger flights, the airline has been continuing freight operations while extending its fleet of turboprop aircraft that is currently made up of 7 Saabs 340 and 11 ATRs 72 (which SprintAir has been acquiring gradually since 2014). In January 2008 SprintAir Group was established and the airline changed its name to SprintAir.

In the summer of 2011, SprintAir operated charter flights from several Polish airports to holiday destinations (mainly in the Mediterranean region) using a single leased Airbus A320 aircraft. This activity was suspended with the end of summer 2011 season and has not been continued.

SprintAir is now mainly an air cargo company performing both scheduled and ad hoc operations around Europe. Scheduled passenger services which previously were operated within Poland are no longer offered.

== Destinations ==
SprintAir serves scheduled cargo flights to the following destinations:

Country	City	Airport
Germany	Cologne	Cologne Bonn Airport
Poland	Gdańsk	Gdańsk Lech Wałęsa Airport
Poland	Katowice	Katowice Airport
Poland	Poznań	Poznań–Ławica Airport
Poland	Warsaw	Warsaw Chopin Airport
Poland	Wrocław	Wrocław Airport

== Fleet ==
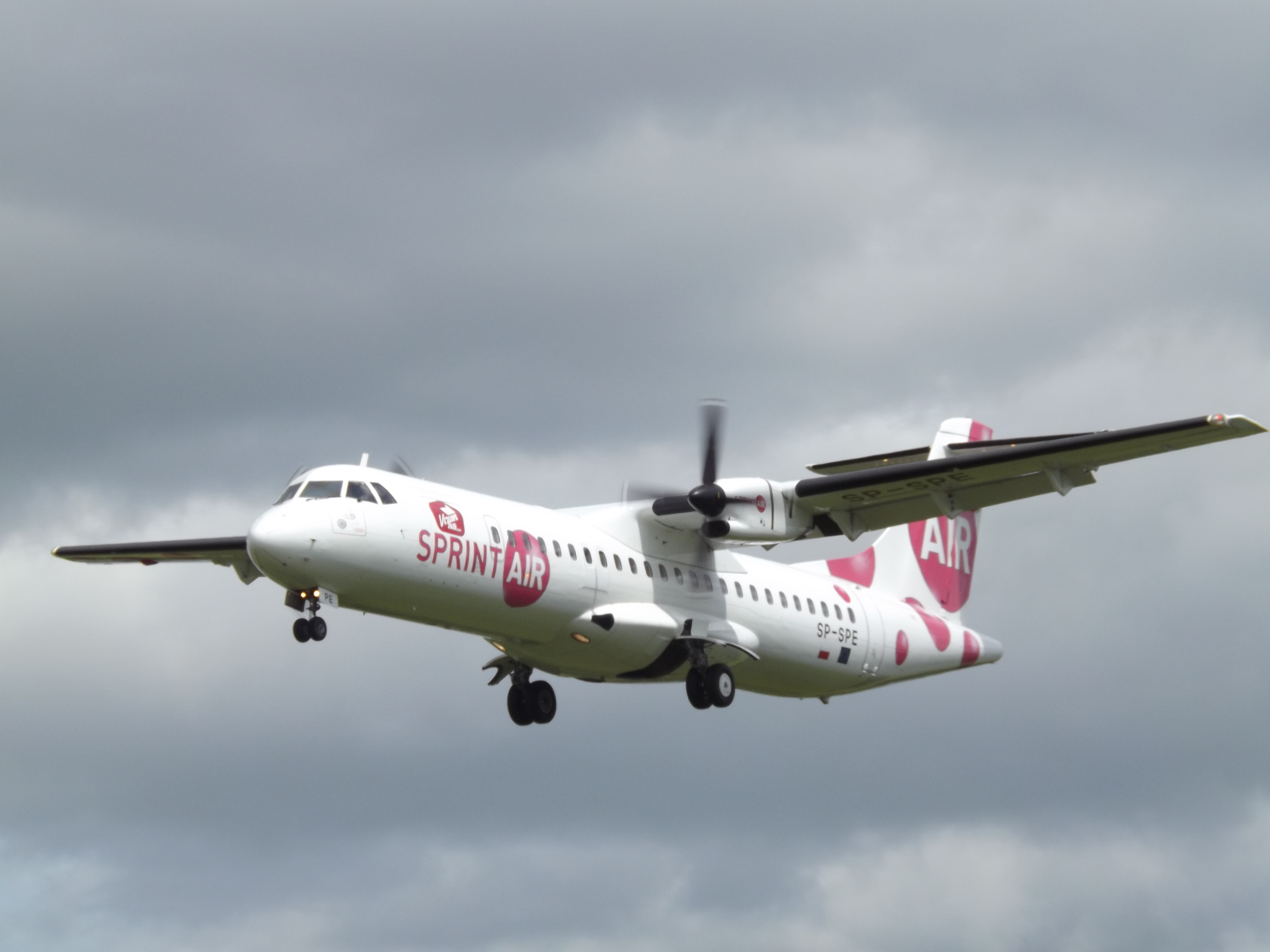
SprintAir ATR 72-200

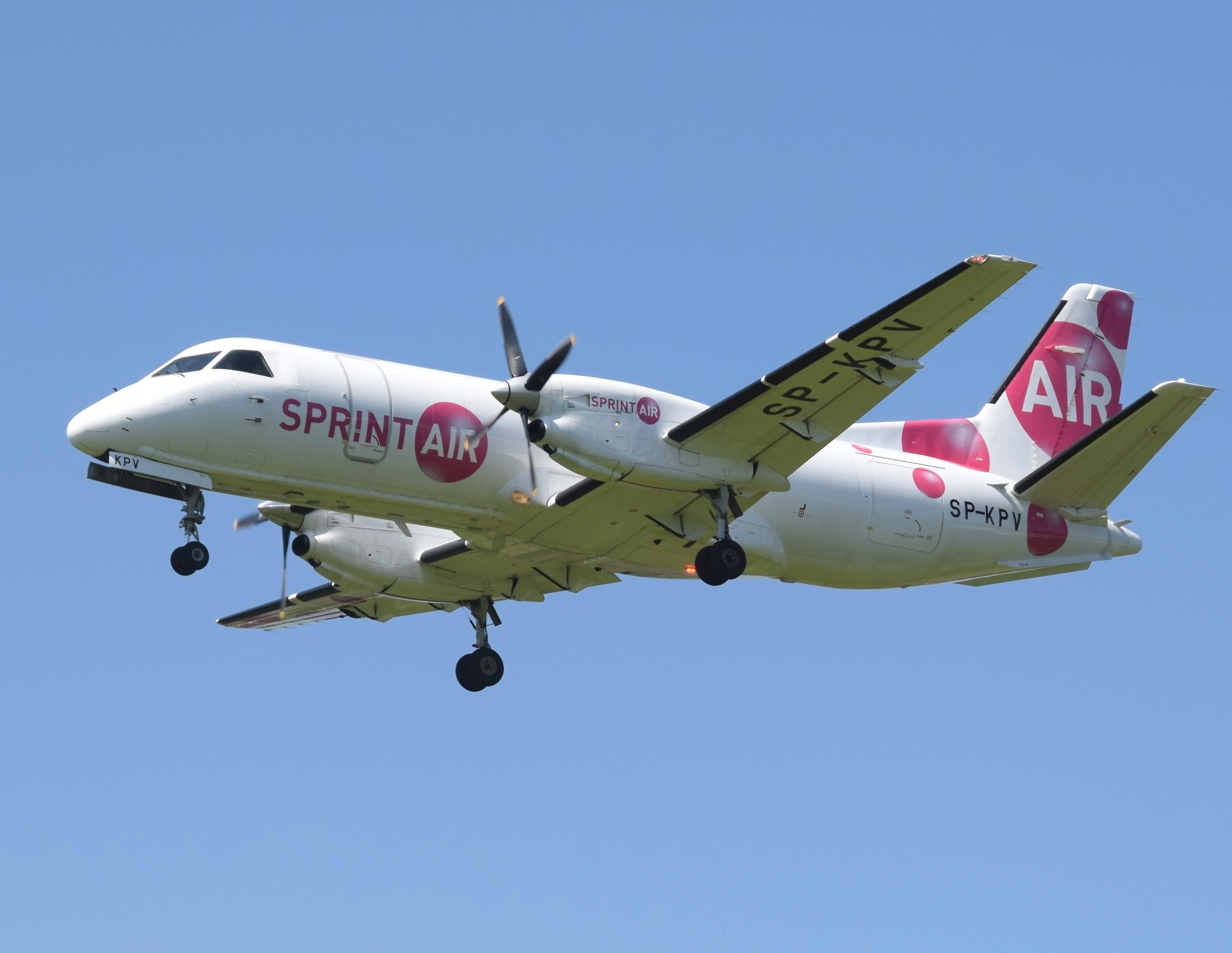
SprintAir Saab 340A

As of August 2025, SprintAir operates the following aircraft:

SprintAir fleet
Aircraft	In service	Orders	Passengers	Notes
ATR 72-200F	6	—	Cargo	
ATR 72-500F	5	—	Cargo	
Saab 340A	4	—	33	1 in passenger configuration 1 in "quick change" configuration for passenger or cargo operations
Saab 340A	4	—	34	1 in passenger configuration 1 in "quick change" configuration for passenger or cargo operations
Saab 340AF	3	—	Cargo	
Total	18	—		
