= SkyTaxi (airline) =

Polish charter airline

- SkyTaxi Boeing 767-200(BDSF)
IATA	ICAO	Call sign
TE	IGA	IGUANA
- Founded: 2000
- Hubs: Wrocław Airport
- Fleet size: 3
- Headquarters: Wrocław, Poland
- Website: skytaxi.aero

SkyTaxi Sp. z o.o. is a Polish charter airline headquartered in Wrocław and based at Wrocław Airport. It operates cargo charter flights worldwide.

== Operations ==
Between 2013 and 2018 SkyTaxi also operated scheduled regional services within France using the brand IGavion. Presently (2019-2021), SkyTaxi is supporting DHL with operations in Europe and the Middle East, having aircraft randomly based in Leipzig (LEJ) and Bahrain (BAH). The latest delivery of another B767-200 in October 2021 remains in DHL livery and is aimed to support various operations.

== Fleet ==
=== Current fleet ===
As of August 2025, SkyTaxi operates the following aircraft:

Aircraft	In service	Orders	Payload	Notes
Boeing 767-200SF	1	—	44t	
Boeing 767-300ER(BDSF)	2	—	58t	
Total	3			

=== Historic aircraft ===
The airline fleet previously included the following aircraft (as of 27 October 2013):

- 1 PZL M-20 Mewa
- 3 SAAB 340, one of which in quick change configuration.
