= Branson Airport =

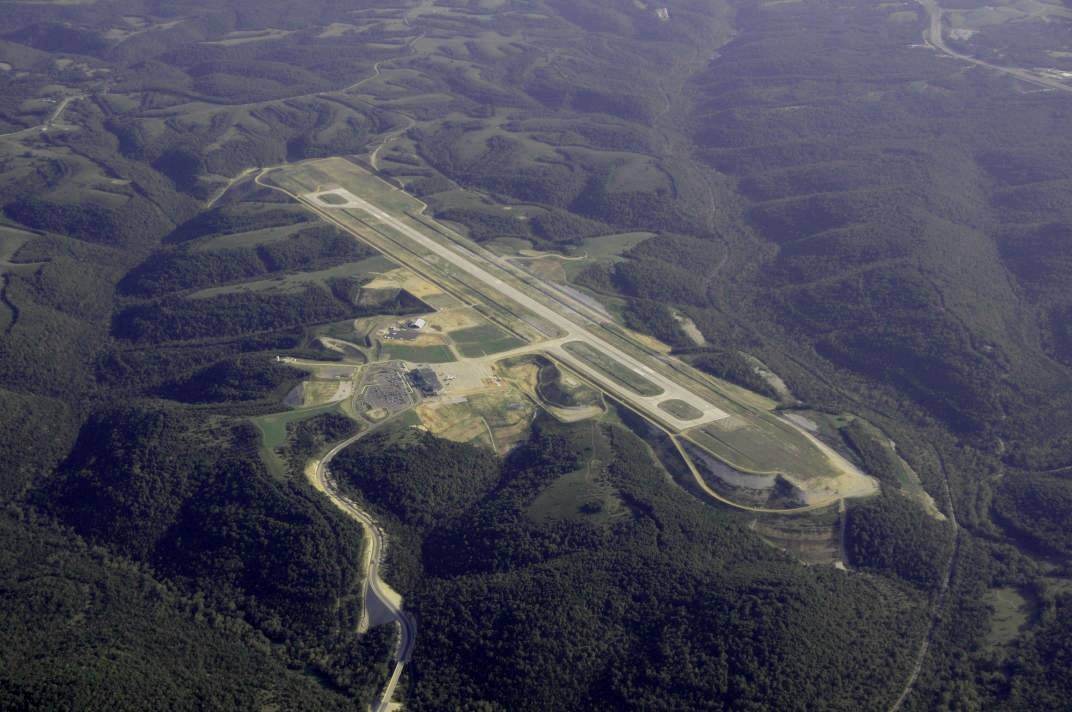
- IATA: BKG; ICAO: KBBG; FAA LID: BBG

Summary
- Airport type: Public (owned by Taney County, MO; leased to Branson Regional Airport Transportation Development District (TDD); and operated by Branson Airport, LLC)
- Serves: Branson, Missouri
- Opened: May 11, 2009 (17 years ago)
- Elevation AMSL: 1,302 ft (397 m)
- Coordinates: 36°31′55″N 093°12′02″W
- Website: www.FlyBranson.com

Map
- Location of airport in Missouri / United States BBG (the United States)

Runways
Direction	Length		Surface
Direction	ft	m	Surface
14/32	7,140	2,176	Concrete

Statistics (2024)
- Aircraft operations: 9,910
- Total passengers: 5,626
- Source: Federal Aviation Administration

Branson Airport (IATA: BKG, ICAO: KBBG, FAA LID: BBG) is a public use airport located eight nautical miles (15 km) south-southeast of the central business district of Branson, a city in Taney County, Missouri, United States. Branson Airport, LLC is a private company operating the airport through an operating agreement with The Branson Regional Airport Transportation District. The airport is owned by Taney County.

Branson Airport’s three-letter location identifier for IATA, is BKG, and the three-letter location identifier from the FAA is BBG.

The airport opened on May 11, 2009. In 2023, only private airlines were operating passenger service into the airfield. As of 2025, no scheduled passenger service is available at the airport. There is one FBO on the field, named the Branson Jet Center. One restaurant is located at the airport. The restaurant is open to the public and is located at the Branson Jet Center.

== Opening ==
Prior to construction of Branson Airport, the closest commercial service airport was Springfield-Branson National Airport 62 miles (100 km) northwest of Branson.

The formal grand opening was May 8–10, 2009, during which the U.S. Air Force Thunderbirds performed during an air show. The first scheduled passenger flight arrived the following day, on May 11, 2009 from Minneapolis-St. Paul Airport operated by Sun Country Airlines with a Boeing 737 jetliner.

There were two airlines operating at the time of Branson's opening, AirTran Airways and Sun Country Airlines. Besides AirTran and Sun Country, the airport has been served by Frontier Airlines and Southwest Airlines as well as several regional air carriers.

== Flight history ==
Frontier Airlines launched flights to Branson Airport with daily service to Denver as well as less than daily service to Milwaukee, which was formerly served from Branson through AirTran.

ExpressJet also operated flights under an independent brand known as Branson Air Express to several markets utilizing Embraer ERJ-145 regional jets supporting point-to-point transit.

On February 23, 2011, Branson Airport's largest carrier at the time, AirTran Airways, announced additional flights from Branson to Baltimore, Chicago-Midway and Houston-Hobby. All flights were announced to be year round service.

As of August 2012, Branson Airport was being served with six nonstop departures a day with more than 100 possible connections.

On August 27, 2012, Southwest Airlines announced service to Branson and started service on March 9, 2013. Southwest flew Boeing 737 jetliners nonstop to Chicago-Midway, Dallas-Love, Houston-Hobby and previously flew Saturday only flights to Orlando–International. Southwest Airlines then ended all service into the airport on June 7, 2014.

On February 24, 2014, Frontier Airlines announced their expansion of Branson to Denver service on June 9, 2014. Seasonal service ended in October 2014. Frontier Airlines returned to Branson in the spring of 2018, having served the Branson market for a number of years since the airport opened in 2009.

On April 3, 2014, Buzz Airways, announced new nonstop service to both Chicago-Midway and Houston-Hobby airports that began June 12, 2014, replacing the lost Southwest Airlines service. As of December 2014, this service was operated by Elite Airways with Canadair CRJ regional jet aircraft. Service to Chicago-Midway has since terminated.

On December 23, 2014, Branson AirExpress announced flights operated by Elite Airways and Buzz Airways will continue in 2015 to Chicago-Midway, (MDW) Houston-Hobby (HOU), Austin (AUS) and Denver (DEN). On January 28, 2015, Branson AirExpress announced it would add an additional operator, Orange Air, flying McDonnell Douglas MD-80 jetliners nonstop to Cincinnati (CVG) and New Orleans (MSY) with direct, one stop service to Cancun, Mexico (CUN) via New Orleans from the Branson Airport starting May 6, 2015. On October 5, 2015 the Cincinnati leg of the Orange Air route was terminated, and the Branson-New Orleans-Cancun portion of the route was transferred to Elite Airways.

Elite Airways and Buzz Airways returned as the scheduled air service providers in 2016.

In 2017, the sole provider was Via Air, operating Embraer EMB-145 regional jets to several destinations. In October 2019, the airline declared bankruptcy and ceased all operations.

In February 2018, Frontier Airlines announced it was returning to Branson with seasonal service to Denver (DEN) beginning June 13, 2018. However in 2023, Frontier announced they would not serve the airport for the coming season.

Sun Country Airlines returned to BKG in August 2023 with twice-weekly flights to Minneapolis that ran through November. The airline returned for twice-weekly flights the next year in April through July. The service was supported by a $500,000 Small Community Air Service Development Program grant awarded to the airport by the U.S. Department of Transportation. Sun Country opted to not return to the airport for 2025.

== Facilities and aircraft ==
Branson Airport covers an area of 922 acres (373 ha) at an elevation of 1,302 feet (397 m) above mean sea level. It has one runway designated 14/32 with a concrete surface measuring 7,140 by 150 feet (2,176 x 46 m).

== Airline and destination ==
Sun Country Airlines was the last airline to provide scheduled service to Branson Airport, offering flights to Minneapolis/St. Paul on a seasonal basis. Service to Branson discontinued after the 2024 season, leaving Branson Airport without any scheduled airline service.

== Development and construction ==
The construction of the airport, which involved the flattening of several Ozark Mountains, is claimed to be the largest earthmoving project in Missouri history. A press release noted that between groundbreaking in July 2007 and May 2008 11 million cubic yards of earth had been moved.

The $155 million project includes a 7,140-foot (2,180 m) by 150-foot (46 m) runway, numbered 14/32, and a 58,000-square-foot (5,400 m^{2}) terminal designed to accommodate 1.4 million passengers a year. The $155 million cost of the building the terminal included $38 million in private equity and $117 million in tax free bonds underwritten by Citigroup. The high-risk, high-yield bonds (top rate of 6.5%) were issued by the Branson Regional Airport Transportation Development District. The City of Branson will pay a subsidy of $8.24 to Branson Airport LLC for each arriving visitor with an annual cap of $2 million.

The developer was Branson Airport, LLC and AFCO. The Program Manager was Vasey Aviation Group LLC. The master designer was Burns and McDonnell Engineering. McAninch Corporation handled the earth moving operations. A local contractor Dewitt was the contractor handling the terminal construction.

== See also ==
- List of airports in Missouri

=== Nearby general aviation airports ===
- M. Graham Clark Downtown Airport
- Branson West Airport
- Boone County Airport (Arkansas)

=== Nearest commercial airports ===
- Springfield-Branson National Airport
- Northwest Arkansas Regional Airport
- Joplin Regional Airport
