= Midwest Express Airlines (2019) =

Proposed airline

Midwest Express
IATA	ICAO	Call sign
--	--	--
- Founded: 27 December 2018; 7 years ago
- Commenced operations: TBD (Still to be announced)
- Hubs: Milwaukee Mitchell International Airport
- Fleet size: 0
- Destinations: 4 (proposed)
- Headquarters: Milwaukee, Wisconsin
- Key people: Greg Aretakis (President)
- Website: flymidwestexpress.com

Midwest Express Airlines was a proposed U.S.-based airline operating from Milwaukee Mitchell International Airport led by Greg Aretakis, aviation industry veteran and former VP at Midwest Airlines. On August 28, 2019, the company announced its initial plan of operations by announcing their initial set of routes. The airline had announced earlier in August 2019 an agreement with Elite Airways to provide the services under the branding, livery, customer service and reservations system provided by the Midwest Express operating company. It is intended as a successor to the Midwest Airlines that operated from 1984 to 2010, also headquartered in Milwaukee.

== History ==
The original incarnation of Midwest Airlines had operated from 1984 to 2010 from its base in Milwaukee, serving key business (and later, leisure) markets that had been abandoned by other carriers following the enactment of the Airline Deregulation Act in 1978. The airline earned a reputation for quality among its customer base, offering business class amenities (including low-density seating and complimentary high-quality catering, most notably warm chocolate chip cookies) on all of its aircraft at fares comparable to those of larger airlines. Although some of these services were reduced in order to remain competitive following the September 11 attacks and rising oil prices, it nonetheless remained well-regarded. It was acquired by Republic Airways Holdings in 2009 in the midst of financial difficulty, and merged with Frontier Airlines (which had also been acquired by Republic) in 2010, marking an end to its operations.

In 2017, former executive Greg Aretakis announced the beginnings of a revival of the brand, with the intention of offering similar amenities in some of Midwest's old markets. Throughout 2018, investors were brought on board, and on August 6, 2019, the company announced that Elite Airways, a provider of charter and limited scheduled passenger service, would provide initial flight operations using Bombardier CRJ-200s. Several weeks later, at a press event in Milwaukee, it was revealed that the airline's initial destinations would include Cincinnati, Grand Rapids, and Omaha, all routes previously served by Midwest at the height of its operations. Omaha had also briefly been served with regional service branded under the now-defunct AirTran Airways and OneJet.

On March 10, 2020, the airline announced it was cutting ties with Elite, citing a breach of contract. Midwest Express also filed a lawsuit against Elite, seeking a return of its financial deposit.

== Destinations ==
The airline had proposed to serve the following destinations:

- Milwaukee, Wisconsin (Hub)
- Cincinnati, Ohio
- Grand Rapids, Michigan
- Omaha, Nebraska

== See also ==
- Cal Jet, a similar airline with flights operated by Elite Airways
