= Branson Air Express =

US airline

Branson AirExpress
IATA	ICAO	Call sign
1X	—	—
- Founded: May 17, 2010
- Ceased operations: 2017
- Hubs: Branson Airport
- Parent company: Branson Airport, LLC
- Headquarters: Hollister, Missouri
- Website: www.bransonairexpress.com

FlyBranson Travel, LLC, branded as Branson Air Express, is a defunct air travel marketing brand, based at Branson Airport near Branson, Missouri. Branson AirExpress used the air carrier services of DOT and FAA certificated airlines such as Elite Airways and Southern Airways Express but does not have any aircraft upon its own air carrier operating certificate. This practice was much like that of Southern Skyways or Direct Air. It commenced operations in the fall of 2009. From that date until October 31, 2010, flights were operated by ExpressJet Airlines utilizing two Embraer EMB-145 regional jets. Beginning on November 1 all flights began to be operated by Vision Airlines using two Dornier 328 turboprops. For 2011, the scaled back service was operated by a single Corporate Flight Management BAe Jetstream 41. All 2012 service ended for the Autumn and winter and it did not resume in 2013. With the exit of Southwest Airlines from Branson, the concept was revived with a new name, Buzz Airways, through the summer of 2014.

In November and December, 2014 service under the Branson Air Express name transitioned to Elite Airways larger Bombardier CRJ-200 jet aircraft. Branson Air Express and Buzz Airways operated side-by-side during the summer of 2015, with CFM/Buzz Airways serving Chicago and Austin and Elite Airways operating Branson Air Express service to Denver and Houston. Additionally, on January 28, 2015, Branson AirExpress announced service operated by Orange Air to begin in May 2015 From Branson to New Orleans and Cincinnati. Flights to New Orleans continued on to Cancún. This was Branson Air Express' first large jet service, utilizing a McDonnell Douglas MD-80. Orange Air ceased operating for Branson Air Express on October 5, 2015 - the Cincinnati-Branson route was dropped and Branson-New Orleans-Cancún transferred to Elite Airways and operated through November 29 before ending for the season.

2016 service consisted only of Branson to New Orleans and Austin, operated by CFM/Buzz Airways and Elite Airways to Denver and Houston-Intercontinental. The Elite Airways service was offered worldwide by Global Distribution Systems under the Great Lakes Airlines code.

Branson Air Express did not return for the 2017 season as all service was operated by and sold by Via Air. After that all service was marketed by Via or other airlines and the Branson Air Express brand has not been used.

== Fleet ==
Aircraft	Total	Orders	Passengers	Notes
BAe Jetstream 41	4		30	Operated by Buzz Airways
Bombardier CRJ-200	2		50	Chartered From Elite Airways
