= KPLK =

KPLK may refer to:

- KPLK (FM), a radio station (88.9 FM) licensed to serve Sedro-Woolley, Washington, United States
- M. Graham Clark Downtown Airport (ICAO code KPLK)
