= Boone County Airport (Arkansas) =

Airport in Arkansas, United States

Boone County Airport Boone County Regional Airport

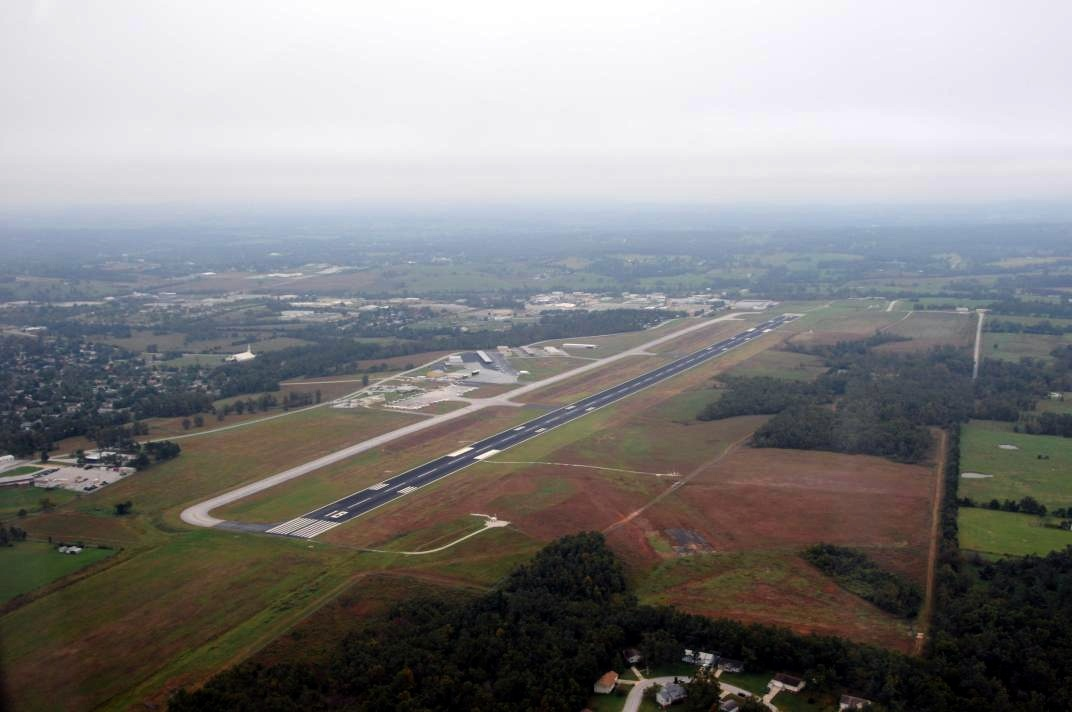
- Airport in 2009
- IATA: HRO; ICAO: KHRO; FAA LID: HRO; WMO: 72345

Summary
- Airport type: Public
- Owner: Boone County
- Serves: Harrison, Arkansas
- Elevation AMSL: 1,365 ft (416 m)
- Coordinates: 36°15′41″N 093°09′17″W
- Website: www.boonecountyairport.com

Map
- Interactive map of Boone County Airport

Runways
Direction	Length		Surface
Direction	ft	m	Surface
18/36	6,161	1,878	Asphalt

Statistics
- Aircraft operations (2021): 10,750
- Based aircraft (2022): 48
- Departing passengers (12 months ending July 2018): 5,110
- Source: FAA and airport website

Boone County Airport (IATA: HRO, ICAO: KHRO, FAA LID: HRO) is a public airport in Boone County, Arkansas. Also known as Boone County Regional Airport, it is four miles northwest of Harrison, Arkansas and serves the surrounding areas including Branson, Missouri. It is used for general aviation and sees one airline, a service subsidized by the federal government's Essential Air Service program at a cost of $2,251,207 per year.

The National Plan of Integrated Airport Systems for 2021–2025 categorized it as a national/regional airport (the commercial service category requires at least 2,500 enplanements per year).

Central Airlines served Harrison starting in 1957; successor Frontier Airlines continued into the 1970s.

In 2025, the airport received a $7 million federal grant to rebuild the 66 year old terminal, add additional hangars and rehabilitate the runway.

== Facilities ==
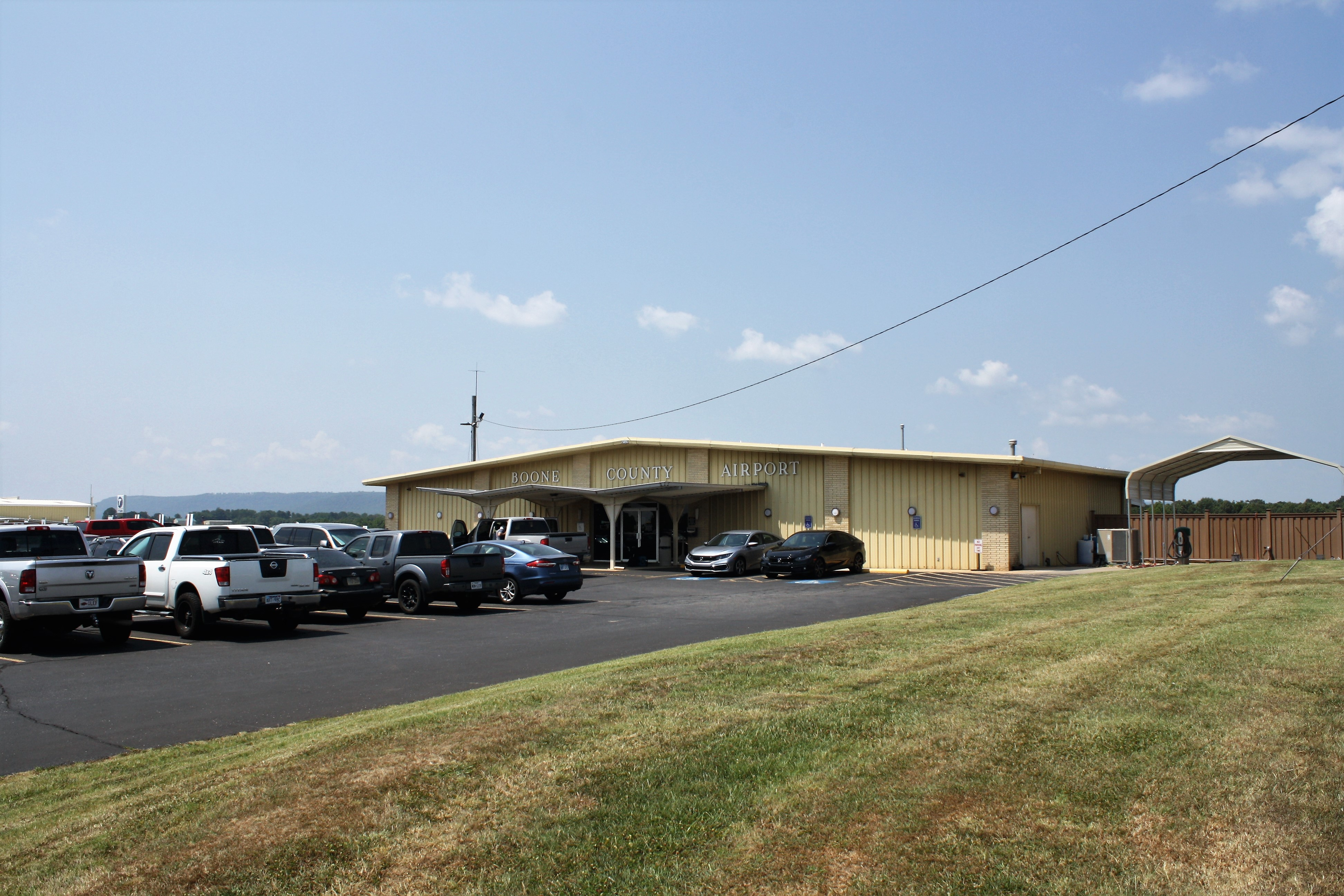

The airport covers 425 acres (172 ha) at an elevation of 1,365 feet (416 m) above mean sea level . Its single runway, 18/36, is 6,161 by 150 feet (1,878 x 46 m) asphalt.

In the year ending December 31, 2021 the airport had 10,750 aircraft operations, an average of 29 per day: 68% general aviation, 20% airline, 11% air taxi and 1% military. In April 2022, there were 48 aircraft based at this airport: 37 single-engine, 8 multi-engine, 2 jet and 1 helicopter.

== Airlines and destinations ==
Airlines	Destinations
Southern Airways Express	Dallas/Fort Worth, Memphis; Seasonal: Hot Springs (AR)

=== Statistics ===
Carrier shares (April 2021 – March 2022)
Carrier	Passengers (arriving and departing)
Southern Airways Express	10,070(100%)

Top domestic destinations (April 2021 – March 2022)
Rank	City	Airport	Passengers
1	Dallas, TX	Dallas/Fort Worth International Airport (DFW)	4,390
2	Memphis, TN	Memphis International Airport (MEM)	660
3	Hot Springs, AR	Memorial Field Airport (HOT)	80

== See also ==
- M. Graham Clark Downtown Airport
- Branson Airport
- List of airports in Arkansas
- Northwest Arkansas Regional Airport

== Other sources ==
- Essential Air Service documents (Docket OST-1997-2935) from the U.S. Department of Transportation:
  - Order 2005-1-14: selecting Air Midwest, Inc., to provide essential air service at El Dorado/Camden, Jonesboro, Harrison and Hot Springs, Arkansas, at a subsidy rate of $4,155,550 annually for a two-year rate term.
  - Order 2007-1-7: selecting Air Midwest, Inc. to provide essential air service at El Dorado/Camden, Jonesboro, Harrison and Hot Springs, Arkansas, at a subsidy rate of $4,296,348 annually for the two-year rate term beginning April 1, 2007.
  - Order 2009-6-25: tentatively selecting Alaska Juneau Aeronautics, Inc. d/b/a SeaPort Airlines (SeaPort) to provide subsidized essential air service (EAS) at El Dorado/Camden, Harrison, Hot Springs, and Jonesboro, Arkansas, for two years.
  - Order 2009-7-8: making final the tentative selection of Alaska Juneau Aeronautics, Inc. d/b/a SeaPort Airlines, to provide essential air service at El Dorado/Camden, Harrison, Hot Springs, and Jonesboro, Arkansas.
