= Branson West Airport =

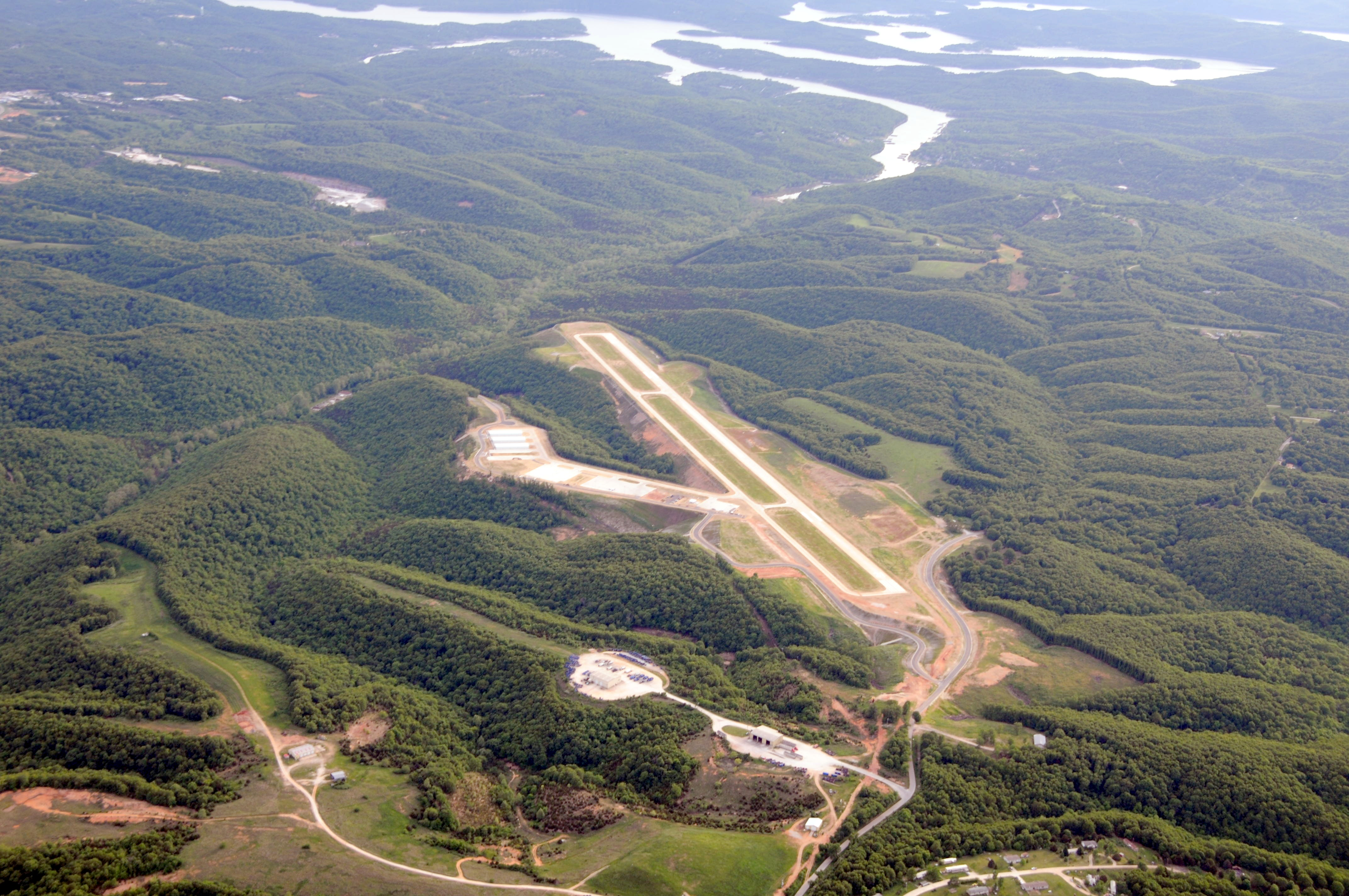
- IATA: none; ICAO: KFWB; FAA LID: FWB

Summary
- Airport type: Public
- Owner: City of Branson West
- Serves: Branson West, Missouri
- Elevation AMSL: 1,348 ft (411 m)
- Coordinates: 36°41′55″N 093°24′08″W
- Interactive map of Branson West Airport

Runways
Direction	Length		Surface
Direction	ft	m	Surface
3/21	5,000	1,524	Concrete
- Source: Federal Aviation Administration

Branson West Airport, also known as Branson West Municipal Airport, (ICAO: KFWB, FAA LID: FWB) is a city-owned, public-use airport located two nautical miles (3.7 km) west of the central business district of the City of Branson West, in Stone County, Missouri, United States. The airport is also known as Emerson Field, named for Robert Emerson, an aviator who relinquished the air rights of his nearby airfield so the Branson West airport could operate safely and obtain a federal grant.

Funded via a federal grant of $16 million, Branson West is a general aviation airport designed for private and charter aircraft. The airport was built on 200 acres (0.81 km^{2}) donated by The Conco Companies of Springfield, with an additional 40 acres (160,000 m^{2}) acquired by the city for runway protection zones. Another 450 acres (1.8 km^{2}) donated by Kay Renfro will be used for future development, and 200 acres (0.81 km^{2}) donated by city treasurer Martin Eastwood will serve as a conservation buffer zone.

== Facilities ==
Branson West Airport resides at an elevation of 1,348 feet (411 m) above mean sea level. It has one runway designated 3/21 with a concrete surface measuring 5,000 by 75 feet (1,524 x 23 m). The runway officially opened in December 2009 with the landing of nine aircraft. The next phase of construction will include a terminal, hangars, maintenance and fuel facilities.

== See also ==
- M. Graham Clark Downtown Airport
