= Orange Air =

American airline

IATA	ICAO	Call sign
-	ORN	-
- Founded: April 1, 2011; 15 years ago
- Commenced operations: June 10, 2014; 11 years ago
- Ceased operations: April 30, 2017; 9 years ago
- Hubs: Orlando Sanford International Airport
- Fleet size: 2
- Headquarters: Sanford, Florida, United States
- Key people: Jeffrey Stern (President)
- Website: www.flyorangeair.com

Orange Air, LLC was an American charter airline that began service in 2014. It was based at Orlando Sanford International Airport and was headquartered on the grounds of the airport, through its short time in operation.

== History ==
Orange Air began operating sports charters in late 2014. It began its first public charter service in May 2015 operating for Branson Air Express on a Cincinnati-Branson-New Orleans-Cancún routing. On October 5, 2015, the Cincinnati leg was terminated, and the Branson-New Orleans-Cancun portion of the route was transferred to Elite Airways.

Orange announced on October 15, 2015, that it would be adding the Boeing 737-800 to start replacing their MD-80s and also to add more seats. The number of orders was not announced. Orange Air said that the Boeing 737 is the industry leading aircraft, is fuel efficient and is happy to operate the aircraft. However, Orange Air never took delivery of any 737s. The airline laid off most of its staff in August 2016 and returned its operating certificate to the FAA in April 2017.

== Fleet ==
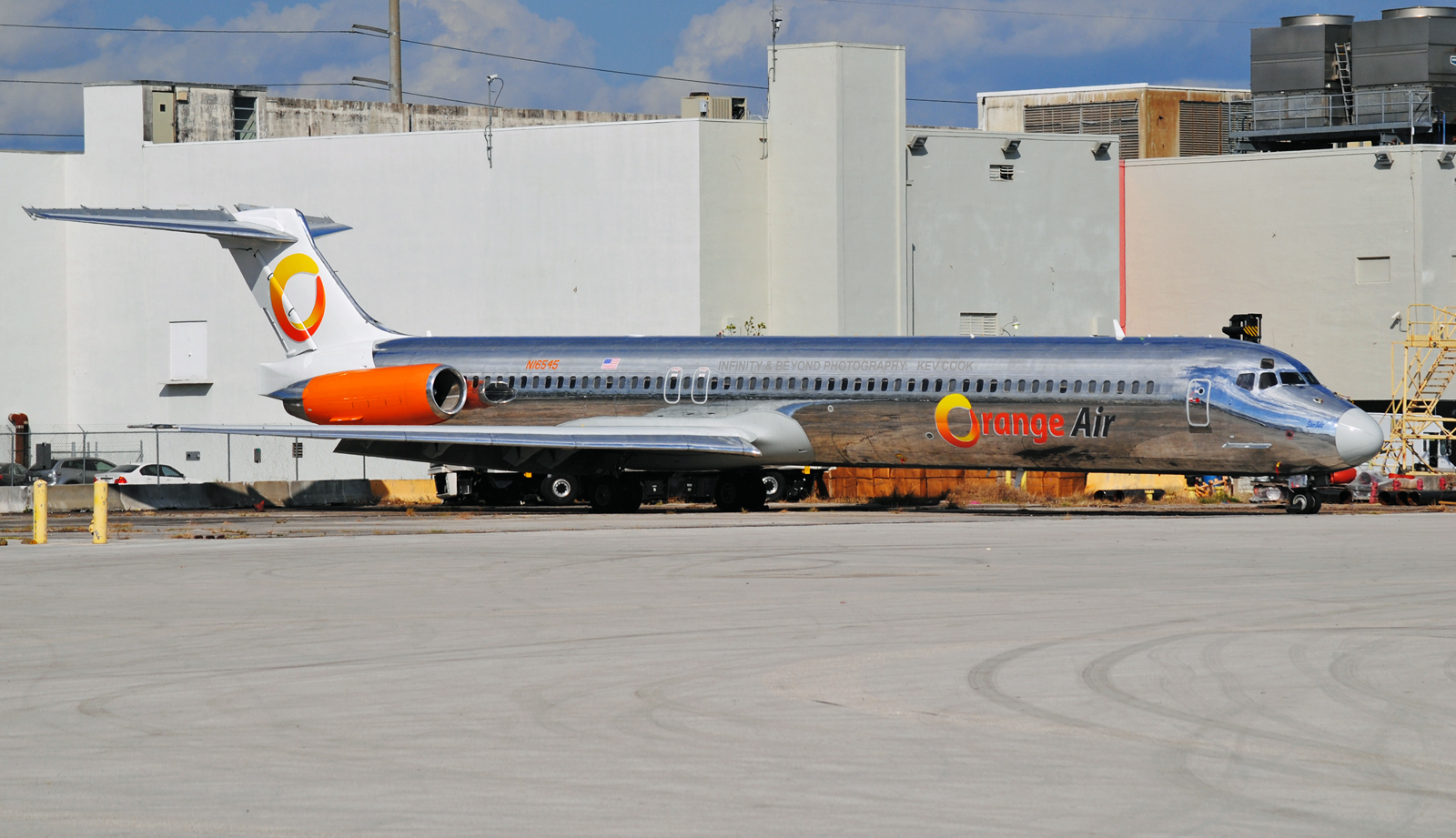
An MD-82 that never entered service with Orange Air. This aircraft was later written-off as RED Air Flight 203.

Orange Air operated a fleet of MD-80 aircraft. At one point it operated as many as five aircraft, although the aircraft were returned to its original owners.

Orange Air fleet
Aircraft	Total	Introduced	Retired	Notes
McDonnell Douglas MD-82	1	2014	2016	
McDonnell Douglas MD-83	1	2015	2017	

== See also ==
- List of defunct airlines of the United States
