= Buzz Airways =

Airline of the United States

IATA	ICAO	Call sign
1X	VTE	VOLUNTEER
- Commenced operations: 2014; 11 years ago
- Ceased operations: 2017; 8 years ago
- Operating bases: Branson Airport
- Fleet size: 4
- Destinations: 3
- Headquarters: Branson, Missouri
- Website: www.buzzair.com

Buzz Airways was a virtual passenger airline that operated from 2014 to 2017 out of Branson Airport in Branson, Missouri, United States. It commenced operations on June 12, 2014, utilizing Jetstream 41 aircraft, and flights were operated as public charters operated by Corporate Flight Management, who previously operated service to Branson under the Branson Air Express banner, utilizing Jetstream 41 aircraft.

Buzz Airways service resumed on May 8, 2015, to Austin and Chicago from Branson.

Buzz Airways' 2016 slate of service from Branson was to Austin and New Orleans, beginning May 27, 2016.

The Buzz Airways service had ended in 2017.

== Former destinations ==
- Austin, Texas - Austin–Bergstrom International Airport
- Branson, Missouri - Branson Airport
- Chicago, Illinois - Midway International Airport
- New Orleans, Louisiana - Louis Armstrong New Orleans International Airport

== Fleet ==
Buzz Airways fleet as of April 2015:

Aircraft	In fleet	Passengers	Notes
BAe Jetstream 41	4	30	Operated by Corporate Flight Management
