= Henson Airlines Flight 1517 =

1985 aviation accident

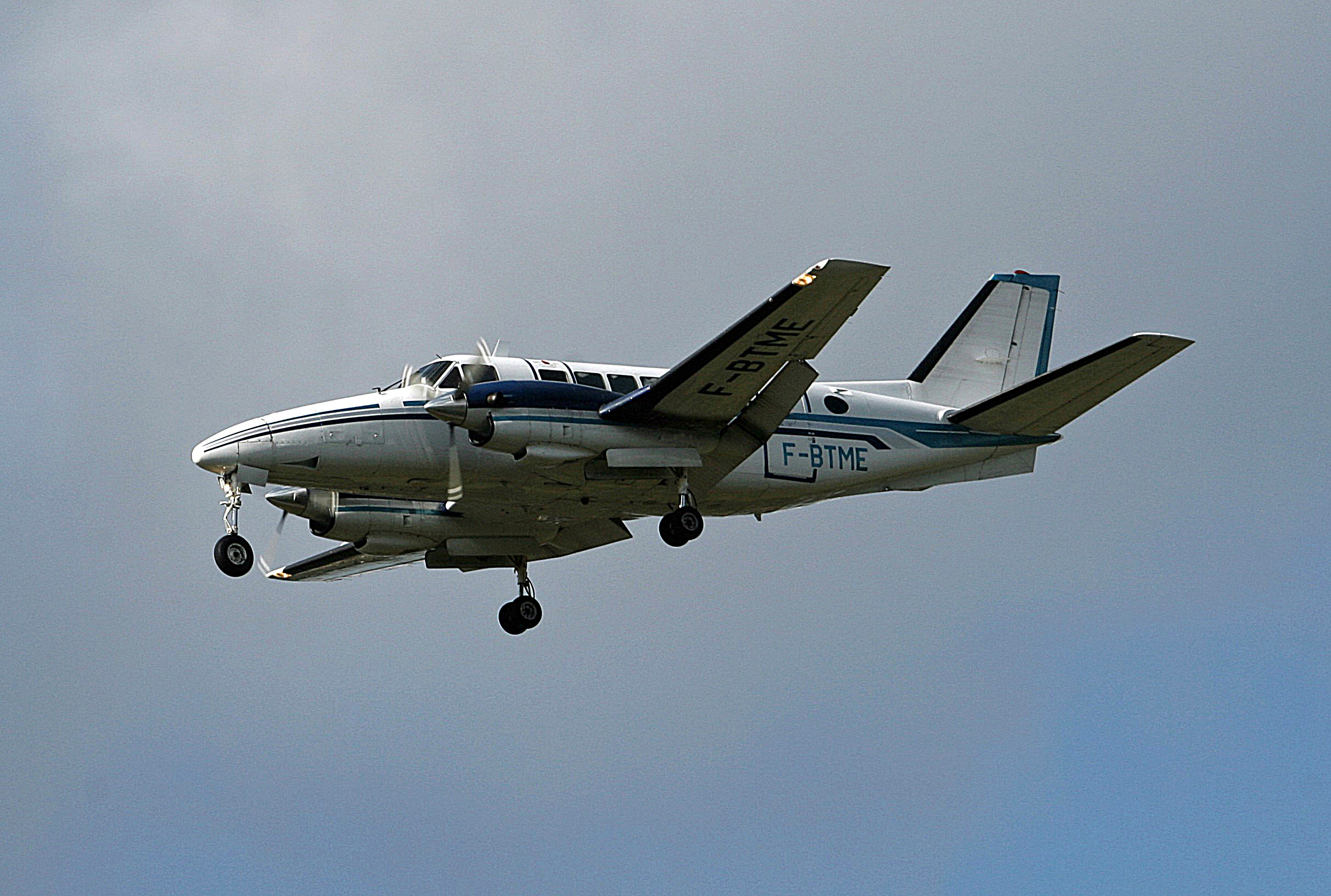
- A Beech 99 similar to the accident aircraft

Accident
- Date: September 23, 1985
- Summary: Controlled flight into terrain due to pilot error
- Site: Grottoes, Virginia; 38°13′35.70″N 78°46′37.50″W

Aircraft
- Aircraft type: Beech 99
- Operator: Henson Airlines d/b/a Piedmont Commuter
- Call sign: HENSON 1517
- Registration: N339HA
- Flight origin: Baltimore-Washington International Airport
- Destination: Shenandoah Valley Regional Airport
- Occupants: 14
- Passengers: 12
- Crew: 2
- Fatalities: 14
- Survivors: 0

On September 23, 1985, Henson Airlines Flight 1517 crashed in Grottoes, Virginia, while on approach to the Shenandoah Valley Regional Airport. The two pilots and twelve passengers were killed.

== Accident details ==
Henson Airlines Flight 1517 was a regular scheduled flight from Baltimore-Washington International Airport to Shenandoah Valley Regional Airport. The flight was operated on behalf of Piedmont Airlines as Piedmont Commuter.

At 9:59 am, Flight 1517 departed Baltimore bound for Shenandoah Valley. On board were twelve passengers and two crew members. The crew were Captain Martin Burns III (27), and First Officer Zilda Spadaro-Wolan (26).

The flight was routine until approach into Shenandoah Valley. At 10:14 am, Captain Burns told the Air Traffic Controller that he believed that the plane was too far west of his course. The controller tried several times to reach Flight 1517 by radio to no avail.

The search for Flight 1517 started at 10:25 am. At 6:42 pm, Civil Air Patrol located the crash site 6 miles east from the airport. Flight 1517 struck the southwest face of Hall Mountain at an elevation of 2,400 ft.

Zilda Spadaro-Wolan was the first female commercial airline pilot to perish in an airplane crash in the United States.

== Cause ==
The US National Transportation Safety Board determined that the probable cause of this accident was a navigational error by the flight crew resulting from their use of the incorrect navigational facility and their failure to adequately monitor the flight instruments. Factors which contributed to the flightcrew's errors were: (1) the nonstandardized navigational radio systems installed in the airline's Beech 99 fleet; (2) intracockpit communication difficulties associated with high ambient noise levels in the airplane; (3) inadequate training of the pilots by the airline; (4) the first officer's limited multiengine and instrument flying experience; (5) the pilots' limited experience in their positions in the Beech 99; and (6) stress-inducing events in the lives of the pilots. Also contributing to the accident was the inadequate surveillance of the airline by the Federal Aviation Administration which failed to detect the deficiencies which led to the accident.

== Notable passengers ==
The passengers included playwright and actor Larry Shue and several executives of Beiersdorf, a personal care products company.
