= Shenandoah Valley Regional Airport =

Airport in Virginia, United States of America

- IATA: SHD; ICAO: KSHD; FAA LID: SHD

Summary
- Airport type: Public
- Owner: Shenandoah Valley Regional Airport Comm.
- Serves: Staunton, Waynesboro, Harrisonburg
- Location: Weyers Cave, Virginia
- Opened: 1958; 68 years ago
- Elevation AMSL: 1,201 ft / 366 m
- Coordinates: 38°15′50″N 078°53′47″W
- Website: www.flyshd.com

Map

Runways
Direction	Length		Surface
Direction	ft	m	Surface
5/23	6,002	1,829	Asphalt

Statistics (2021)
- Aircraft operations: 37,204
- Based aircraft: 64
- Source: Federal Aviation Administration

Shenandoah Valley Regional Airport (IATA: SHD, ICAO: KSHD, FAA LID: SHD) is in the census-designated place of Weyers Cave, Virginia, United States, 5 miles (8.0 km) west of the Town of Grottoes and 12 miles (19 km) northeast of the City of Staunton. It is used for general aviation and is served by one airline, subsidized by the Essential Air Service program.

The airport is operated by the Shenandoah Valley Regional Airport Commission, with members from the cities of Staunton, Waynesboro and Harrisonburg, and the counties of Augusta and Rockingham.

Federal Aviation Administration records say the airport had 7,746 passenger boardings (enplanements) in calendar year 2008, 8,364 in 2009 and 10,408 in 2010. The National Plan of Integrated Airport Systems for 2011–2015 categorized it as a non-primary commercial service airport based on enplanements in 2008/2009 (between 2,500 and 10,000 per year).

== Facilities ==
The airport covers 433 acres (175 ha) at an elevation of 1,201 feet (366 m). Its single runway, 5/23, is 6,002 by 150 feet (1,829 x 46 m) asphalt.

In 2021 the airport had 37,204 aircraft operations, average 102 per day: 95% general aviation, 4% commercial, and <1% military. 64 aircraft were then based at this airport: 49 single-engine, 12 multi-engine, 2 jet, and 1 helicopter.

== History ==
=== Early history ===
Rockingham and Augusta counties and the cities of Harrisonburg, Waynesboro and Staunton formed a commission to build a regional airport in the 1950s. Construction was completed in 1958; the 4000-foot runway was extended to 5,000 feet (1,500 m) after a few years, and to 6,000 feet (1,800 m) by 1970. Piedmont Airlines DC-3s arrived in 1960; the last Piedmont YS-11 left in 1981.

=== Additions and renovations ===
In 1991 a $900,000 renovation project was completed. The commuter terminal was enlarged by 4,000 square feet (370 m^{2}) and lounge space, secure areas, and concession areas were added.

In 1993 Shenandoah Valley Regional Airport Commission closed its 25-year-old aircraft maintenance shop because it was barely breaking even. The Commission decided that a private company, Classic Aviation Services Inc., would provide aircraft maintenance services at the airport.

In 1996 the airport completed a $2 million project to enlarge public-use areas of the terminal, add an observation area, expand the apron, and add new hangars.

A regional visitor information center was added to the airport in 1996.

The Transportation Security Administration took over security screening at the airport in August 2002.

In September 2003 the airport was awarded a $100,000 federal grant to add on-demand ground transportation within Rockingham County and Augusta County.

Free bus service between the airport and Harrisonburg, Staunton, and Waynesboro began in March 2004. Bus stops included James Madison University, Eastern Mennonite University, and a Courtyard by Marriott in Harrisonburg.

The airport was awarded a $4.6 million federal grant to repair its runways in May 2004. A $2.9 million federal grant to repair the airport's taxiway was awarded in July 2005.

The airport repaired its transient aircraft aprons with a $1.2 million federal grant in 2009.

The airport completed a $2 million project to add seating and lobby space for passengers, add space for security inspectors, add modern restrooms compliant with the Americans With Disabilities Act, and replace its 50-year-old mechanical and utility systems.

The airport received a $1.6 million federal grant to buy two snow removal vehicles and an airport fire-rescue vehicle in August 2016.

=== Airline service ===
Chatauqua Airlines ran US Airways Express' connector service between Shenandoah Valley Regional Airport and Pittsburgh International Airport from July 1996 to June 2000.

United Express began service between Shenandoah Valley Regional Airport and Washington Dulles International Airport in April 2000. United Express service at the airport ended in December 2001.

Air Midwest offered US Airways Express' connector service between Shenandoah Valley Regional Airport and Pittsburgh International Airport in June 2000. Its service ended in April 2003. Colgan Air began offering US Airways Express' connector service between Shenandoah Valley Regional Airport and Pittsburgh International Airport in April 2003, when the airport became eligible for federal subsidies under the Essential Air Service program. The service to Pittsburgh ended in July 2004 when US Airways downgraded Pittsburgh's status from a hub to a focus city.

US Airways Express restarted service between Shenandoah Valley Regional Airport and Washington Dulles International Airport in April 2005. Colgan Air started offering service between Shenandoah Valley Regional Airport and Washington Dulles International Airport in February 2008.

In 2011 Roanoke's representative to Congress Bob Goodlatte advocated ending a federal subsidy program called Essential Air Service that made it financially viable for private airlines to offer service to small airports such as Shenandoah Valley.

In 2012 Colgan Air ended service to Shenandoah Valley Regional Airport after the carrier's parent company declared bankruptcy in 2012. The service was replaced by Silver Airways in July 2012. Silver Airways' service to the airport ended in November 2016.

Frontier Airlines began service between Shenandoah Valley Regional Airport and Orlando International Airport in November 2012. The service was canceled in April 2013.

ViaAir began flights between Shenandoah Valley Regional Airport and Charlotte-Douglas International Airport in September 2016. ViaAir also began flights from Shenandoah Valley Regional Airport to Orlando Sanford International Airport. In November 2017, it was announced that the EAS routes served by ViaAir would cease and SkyWest, operated as United Express, service would replace ViaAir beginning on April 1, 2018. SkyWest ended service in November 2022.

The U.S. Department of Transportation awarded Contour Airlines, a partner of American Airlines, a three-year contract to operate service at Shenandoah Valley Regional Airport as part of the Essential Air Service program from November 1, 2022, to October 31, 2025.

On September 19, 2025, the U.S. Department of Transportation selected SkyWest Airlines to provide service from Shenandoah Valley Regional Airport as part of the Essential Air Service program. SkyWest Airlines has a codeshare agreement with American Airlines. According to SkyWest Airlines' proposal, it will provide 12 roundtrip flights per week from the airport to Charlotte and Chicago O'Hare between November 1, 2025, and October 31, 2029.

=== Accidents and incidents ===
- On September 23, 1985, Henson Airlines Flight 1517 was on approach to the airport when it crashed due to pilot error leading to a CFIT. All 14 people on board the flight died.

== Airline and destinations ==
=== Passenger ===
Airlines	Destinations	Refs.
American Eagle	Charlotte, Chicago–O'Hare	

=== Annual Traffic ===
Annual Traffic
Year	Passengers	Change from Previous Year	Airline(s)	Destination(s)
2005	10,271		Colgan Air dba US Airways Express	Washington–Dulles
2006	10,624	▲3.44%	Colgan Air dba US Airways Express	Washington–Dulles
2007	9,202	▼13.38%	Colgan Air dba US Airways Express	Washington–Dulles
2008	14,932	▲62.27%	Colgan Air dba US Airways Express	Washington–Dulles
2008	14,932	▲62.27%	Colgan Air dba United Express	Washington–Dulles
2009	16,726	▲12.01%	Colgan Air dba United Express	Washington–Dulles
2010	20,710	▲23.82%	Colgan Air dba United Express	Washington–Dulles
2011	23,270	▲12.36%	Colgan Air dba United Express	Washington–Dulles
2012	29,140	▲25.23%	Colgan Air dba United Express	Washington–Dulles
2012	29,140	▲25.23%	Silver Airways	Washington–Dulles
2012	29,140	▲25.23%	Frontier Airlines	Orlando
2013	38,250	▲31.26%	Silver Airways	Washington–Dulles
2013	38,250	▲31.26%	Frontier Airlines	Orlando
2014	18,776	▼50.91%	Silver Airways	Washington–Dulles
2015	10,462	▼44.28%	Silver Airways	Washington–Dulles
2016	10,771	▲2.95%	Silver Airways	Washington–Dulles
2016	10,771	▲2.95%	ViaAir	Charlotte
2016	10,771	▲2.95%	ViaAir	Orlando/Sanford
2017	10,226	▼5.06%	ViaAir	Charlotte
2017	10,226	▼5.06%	ViaAir	Orlando/Sanford
2018	23,180	▲126.68%	ViaAir	Charlotte
2018	23,180	▲126.68%	ViaAir	Orlando/Sanford
2018	23,180	▲126.68%	SkyWest Airlines dba United Express	Chicago–O'Hare
2018	23,180	▲126.68%	SkyWest Airlines dba United Express	Lewisburg (WV)
2018	23,180	▲126.68%	SkyWest Airlines dba United Express	Washington–Dulles
2019	33,540	▲44.69%	SkyWest Airlines dba United Express	Chicago–O'Hare
2019	33,540	▲44.69%	SkyWest Airlines dba United Express	Washington–Dulles
2020	11,839	▼64.70%	SkyWest Airlines dba United Express	Chicago–O'Hare
2020	11,839	▼64.70%	SkyWest Airlines dba United Express	Washington–Dulles
2021	26,540	▲124.17%	SkyWest Airlines dba United Express	Chicago–O'Hare
2021	26,540	▲124.17%	SkyWest Airlines dba United Express	Washington–Dulles
2022	17,997	▼32.19%	SkyWest Airlines dba United Express	Chicago–O'Hare
2022	17,997	▼32.19%	SkyWest Airlines dba United Express	Washington–Dulles
2022	17,997	▼32.19%	Contour Airlines	Charlotte
2022	17,997	▼32.19%	Contour Airlines	Lewisburg (WV)
2023	13,601	▼24.43%	Contour Airlines	Charlotte
2023	13,601	▼24.43%	Contour Airlines	Clarksburg
2024	15,457	▲13.65%	Contour Airlines	Charlotte

== Bibliography ==
- Essential Air Service documents (Docket OST-2002-11378) from the U.S. Department of Transportation:
  - Order 2003-1-14 (January 17, 2003): selecting Colgan Air, Inc., d/b/a US Airways Express, to provide essential air service at Staunton, Virginia at a subsidy rates of $623,667 for the first year, with an extension for a second year subject to the mutual agreement of the carrier and the Department, and (b) establishing a subsidy rate of $514,211 annually for the hold-in service being operated ay Staunton by Air Midwest, Inc., d/b/a US Airways Express, from April 23, 2002, until Colgan begins service.
  - Order 2004-2-8 (February 9, 2004): selects Colgan Air, Inc., d/b/a US Airways Express, to provide essential air service at Staunton, Virginia, for an additional one-year period beginning May 1, 2004, at a subsidy rate of $615,578.
  - Order 2005-1-2 (January 7, 2005): selecting Colgan Air, Inc., d/b/a/ US Airways Express, to provide essential air service at Staunton, Virginia, for the two-year period beginning May 1, 2005, and establishing final subsidy rate.
  - Order 2007-1-17 (January 26, 2007): selecting Colgan Air, Inc., d/b/a US Airways Express, to provide essential air service at Staunton, Virginia, for the two-year period beginning May 1, 2007, at an annual subsidy rate of $1,389,727.
  - Order 2008-12-29 (December 30, 2008): re-selecting Colgan Air, Inc., d/b/a United Express, to provide subsidized essential air service (EAS) at Staunton, Virginia, for the two-year period beginning May 1, 2009, at the annual subsidy rate of $1,911,466.
  - Order 2011-3-2 (March 1, 2011): selecting Colgan Air, Inc. to provide essential air service (EAS) at Staunton, Virginia, for an annual subsidy of $2,180,461, for the two-year period from May 1, 2011, through April 30, 2013.
  - Ninety-Day Notice (March 8, 2012): from Colgan Airlines, Inc. of termination of Essential Air Service at Staunton, Virginia.
  - Order 2012-3-14 (March 23, 2012): prohibits Colgan Airlines, Inc. d/b/a United Airlines Express, from terminating service at Altoona and Johnstown, PA; Victoria, TX; Staunton, VA; and Beckley, Clarksburg/Fairmont, and Morgantown, WV, for 30 days beyond the end of the 90-day notice period, i.e. July 8, 2012. Also requesting proposals by April 25, 2012, from air carriers interested in providing replacement Essential Air Service (EAS) at Victoria, TX; and Staunton, VA, for a new term, with or without subsidy.
