= ViaAir =

American regional airline

Via Airlines
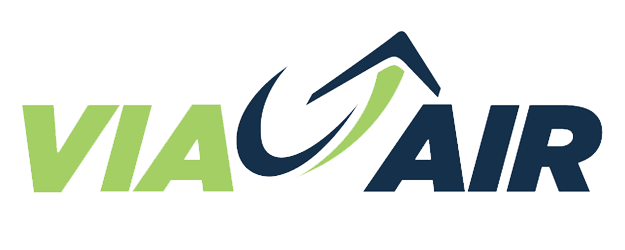
IATA	ICAO	Call sign
VC	SRY	STINGRAY
- Founded: March 27, 1997; 28 years ago
- Ceased operations: October 2019; 6 years ago
- AOC #: 4VAA
- Operating bases: Orlando, Florida
- Fleet size: 6
- Destinations: 2
- Headquarters: Maitland, Florida
- Key people: Irit Vizer (President & COO); Part 121 Director of Operations - Open; Rick Stanger (Director of QCQA); Part 135 Director of Operations - Open; Pablo Ratti (Chief Pilot); Keri Edwards (Director of Safety)
- Employees: 270
- Website: www.flyviaair.com

Via Airlines was a US domestic regional airline offering scheduled service across the United States. The airline originally focused on scheduled Essential Air Service from Raleigh County Memorial Airport in Beckley, West Virginia, Parkersburg/Marietta in Parkersburg, West Virginia to Charlotte Douglas International Airport in Charlotte, North Carolina, but had since withdrawn from servicing any areas and maintained only their charter services. In October 2019, the airline declared bankruptcy and ceased all operations.

== History ==
Via Airlines was established on March 27, 1997, and operated public and private charter flights for corporations, sports teams, casinos, and air travel functions before expanding to scheduled passenger flight services with ViaAir.

Via Airlines began its EAS scheduled flights in December 2014, with the inaugural flight to Beckley, WV taking place on December 3. Prior to ViaAir beginning flights, air service was operated by United Express. The same day as the inaugural Beckley flight, ViaAir announced it would be operating seasonal unsubsidized nonstop service from Charlotte Douglas International Airport to Northeast Florida Regional Airport in St. Augustine, Florida, with its inaugural flight taking place on December 19, 2014.

After a seasonal trial, an agreement was reached to continue service to St. Augustine from Charlotte and Beckley. In early November 2015, ViaAir announced it would extend its St. Augustine service into 2016.

ViaAir, with flights operated by the Charter Air Transport fleet, offers additional air travel options with its AirCruise and Air Tours products. ViaAir's aviation products began in 2009 with its Air Tours, and introduced AirCruise in 2011. AirCruise introduced a concept similar to naval cruises, but that transports passengers by plane instead of by boat. While naval cruising is limited to ports, AirCruise is able to reach landlocked destinations.

On November 15, 2017, ViaAir announced two new destinations from Austin (Oklahoma City and Tucson), taking its total destinations from Austin up to four. Coinciding with this information was the announcement that "ViaAir plans to base crews and maintenance at the Austin-Bergstrom International Airport, positioning its Austin based operations to expand. We will roll out additional cities throughout next year as we hope to be known as Austin’s hometown airline." On February 9, 2018, Via announced two new destinations from Austin (Little Rock and Tulsa), bringing the total of destinations served from Austin up to six.

On May 23, 2019, ViaAir announced that it was suspending the majority of its commercial operations, citing a pilot shortage, with the only operating flights being between Orlando-Sanford International Airport and Jackson, MS.

On May 26, 2019, Austin Bergstrom International Airport announced that it would stop doing business with the airline after it failed to make payments to the airport and that its last day of service to Austin would be May 30, 2019.

On October 8, 2019, the airline announced it would be filing for Chapter 11 bankruptcy in Florida Middle Bankruptcy Court. The airline has since ceased all operations. In July 2020, Wexford Capital, a Florida-based investment firm, acquired Via Airlines and announced it will relaunch the Airline with a new name.

== Destinations ==
State	City	Airport served	Notes
Alabama	Montgomery	Montgomery Regional Airport	
Arizona	Tucson	Tucson International Airport	
Arkansas	Little Rock	Clinton National Airport	
Florida	Orlando/Sanford	Orlando Sanford International Airport	Base
Florida	Tallahassee	Tallahassee International Airport	
Louisiana	Baton Rouge	Baton Rouge Metropolitan Airport	
Mississippi	Jackson	Jackson-Evers International Airport	
Missouri	Branson	Branson Airport	Seasonal service
North Carolina	Raleigh/Durham	Raleigh–Durham International Airport	
Oklahoma	Tulsa	Tulsa International Airport	
Pennsylvania	Pittsburgh	Pittsburgh International Airport	
South Carolina	Columbia	Columbia Metropolitan Airport	
Texas	Amarillo	Rick Husband Amarillo International Airport	

=== Former destinations ===
State	City	Airport served	Notes
Alabama	Birmingham	Birmingham-Shuttlesworth International Airport	
Alabama	Mobile	Mobile Regional Airport	
Colorado	Denver	Denver International Airport	
Colorado	Hayden	Yampa Valley Airport	Seasonal service
Florida	St. Augustine	Northeast Florida Regional Airport	Seasonal Service
Illinois	Chicago	Midway International Airport	
Maryland	Baltimore	Baltimore–Washington International Airport	
Missouri	Kansas City	Kansas City International Airport	
New York	Farmingdale	Republic Airport	
New York	Niagara Falls	Niagara Falls International Airport	
North Carolina	Charlotte	Charlotte Douglas International Airport	
South Carolina	Myrtle Beach	Myrtle Beach International Airport	
Texas	Austin	Austin–Bergstrom International Airport	
Texas	Dallas/Ft. Worth	Dallas/Fort Worth International Airport	
Texas	Houston	William P. Hobby Airport	
Virginia	Staunton	Shenandoah Valley Regional Airport	Essential Air Service
West Virginia	Beckley	Raleigh County Memorial Airport	Essential Air Service
West Virginia	Clarksburg	North Central West Virginia Airport	Essential Air Service
West Virginia	Lewisburg	Greenbrier Valley Airport	Essential Air Service
West Virginia	Parkersburg	Mid-Ohio Valley Regional Airport	Essential Air Service

== Fleet ==
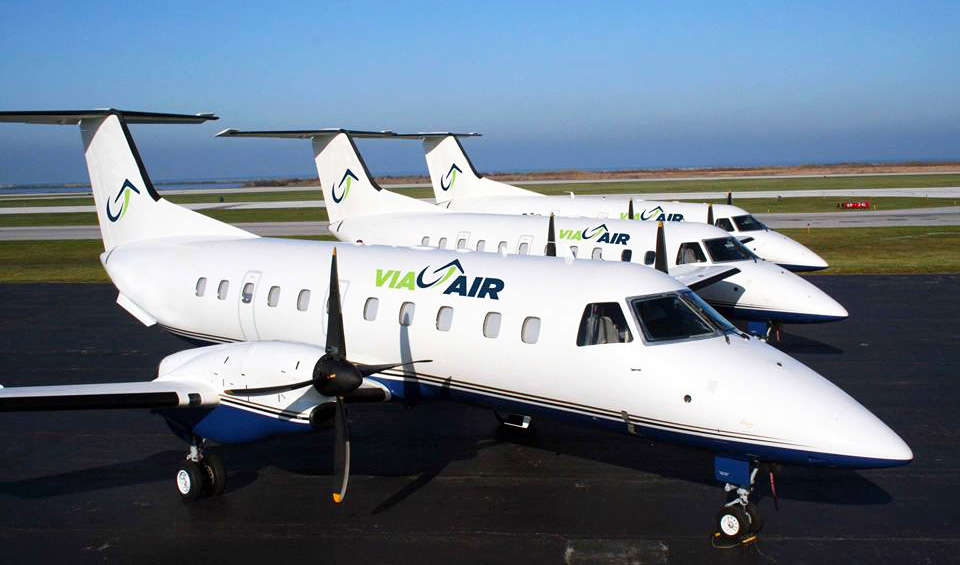
Via Airlines previously operated Embraer EMB-120 Brasilia turboprop aircraft

All regional jet aircraft used for ViaAir public charters are operated by its subsidiary, Via Airlines.

Via Air Fleet
Aircraft	In Service	Orders	Passengers	Notes
Aircraft	In Service	Orders	Total	Notes
Embraer ERJ-145	6	—	50	

== See also ==
- List of defunct airlines of the United States
