= Cal Jet Elite Air =

Airline of the United States

IATA	ICAO	Call sign
7Q (Elite Airways)	MNU	MAINER
- Founded: 2015; 11 years ago
- Ceased operations: 2018; 8 years ago (suspended)
- Hubs: McClellan–Palomar Airport
- Focus cities: Las Vegas, Oakland, San Jose, Sacramento, Phoenix
- Fleet size: 1
- Destinations: 2
- Headquarters: Carlsbad, California
- Website: www.CalJetElite.com

Cal Jet Air, typically referred to as Cal Jet or Cal Jet Elite, was a United States airline business headquartered in Carlsbad, California. On August 16, 2017, Cal Jet announced that the Carlsbad McClellan-Palomar Airport would be their home/hub, announcing daily non-stop service to Las Vegas's McCarran International Airport through a partnership with Elite Airways, unveiling a new brand called Cal Jet by Elite Airways. Cal Jet currently does not have any active flights. The company slogan is Say Goodbye to I-5.

== History ==
=== Initial service ===
On August 16, 2017, Cal Jet announced a daily nonstop service from Carlsbad, California to Las Vegas, Nevada, with service starting September 28, 2017. Cal Jet by Elite Airways initially operated two flights daily, departing from McClellan–Palomar Airport at 9:00 a.m. and 12:45 p.m., with return flights from Las Vegas McCarran International Airport at 11:00 a.m. and 2:45 p.m. This was the first commercial service from McClellan–Palomar Airport in over two years since United Airlines suspended their service to Los Angeles. Cal Jet by Elite Airways operated these flights using a Bombardier CRJ700, with 7-14 Business Class seats, and 56 Economy seats. The inaugural flight was at 9 a.m. local time, September 28, 2017, from the Carlsbad McClellan–Palomar Airport to Las Vegas McCarran International Airport.

=== Service Interruption ===
In February 2018, Cal Jet temporarily suspended flights for two weeks on its Palomar-Las Vegas route. The aircraft was apparently taken out of service to transport NCAA Basketball Players.

=== Service suspension ===
Cal Jet continued service from Carlsbad to Las Vegas until April 18, 2018. They told media that they were ceasing operations at that time to restructure their business plan. Their plan was to have non-stop, daily flights from Palomar Airport in Carlsbad to Oakland, San Jose, Phoenix, Sacramento and Las Vegas. Once the aircraft were acquired and supporting operations were in place, Cal Jet planned to restart service. However, as of December 2019, the airline's website continued to report that its operations remained suspended. Their website is offline as of June 2019. Cal Jet's Twitterfeed and Facebook page have not been updated since the April 2018 announcement. The suspension inconvenienced many passengers who enjoyed the convenience of flying out of McCellan Palomar Airport.

== Fleet ==
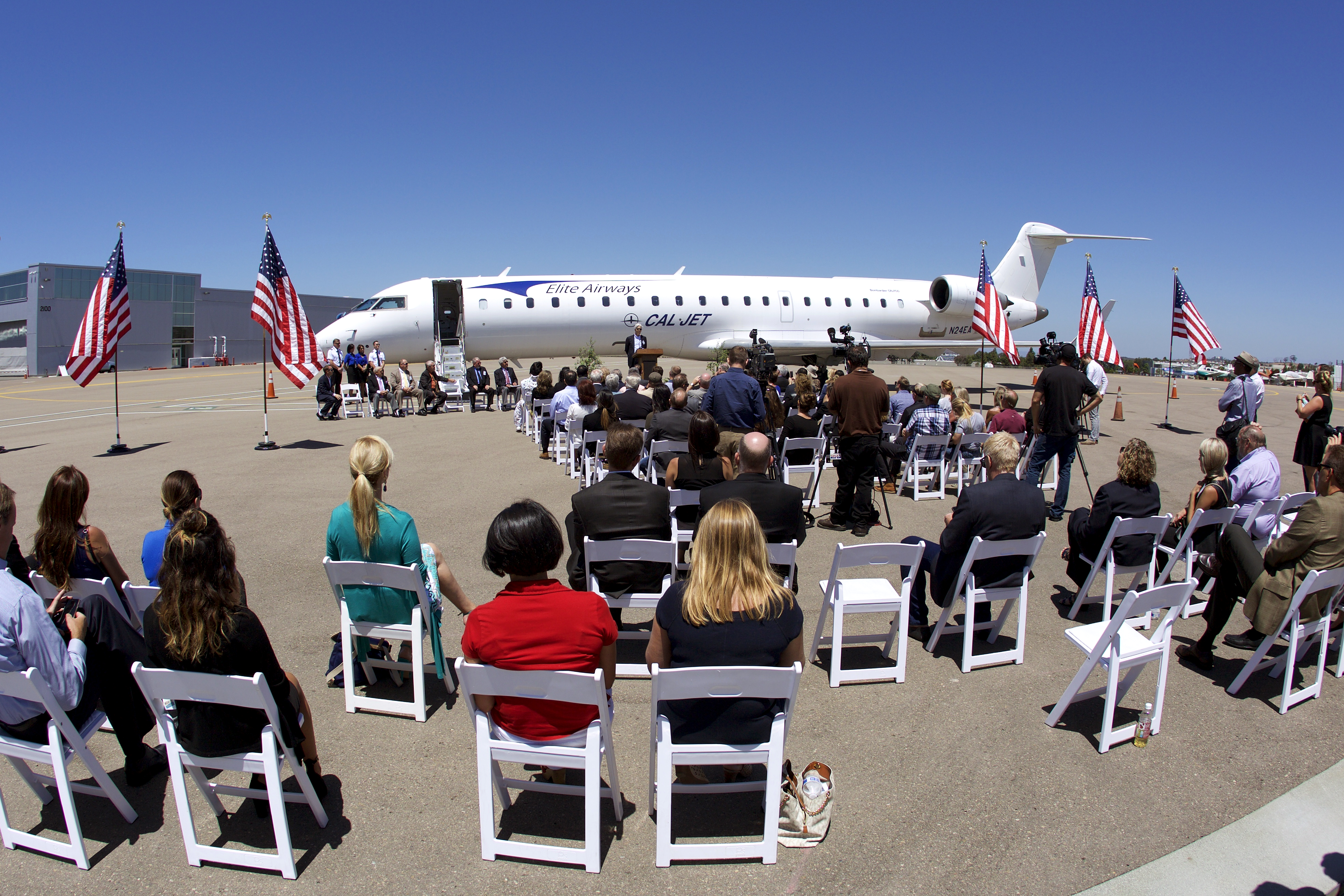
Cal Jet Elite Air CRJ700

Aircraft	Passengers	Notes
CRJ700	63	7-14 Business Class, 56 Economy

The cabin of Cal Jet's CRJ-700 aircraft were arranged in a two-class configuration separated by a curtain. Seating was the same for business and economy, but business occupied the first rows of the plane. Business class passengers received complimentary snacks and alcoholic beverages.

== Management ==
- Robert Daly, CEO, former chairman and CEO of Sun Country Airlines and president of Pacific Coast Gaming.
- George Wozniak, President and CMO, former CEO of Hobbit Travel, Trilogy Tours and had a significant marketing role at Sun Country Airline.
- Jim Buntz, VP of Business Development, 25-year career with AT&T with sales and operations executive positions.
- Tim Smith, VP Business Sales/Marketing, former president of Global Point Travel and sales executive with PSA and Cal Air.
