= Northeast Florida Regional Airport =

Airport in Florida, U.S.

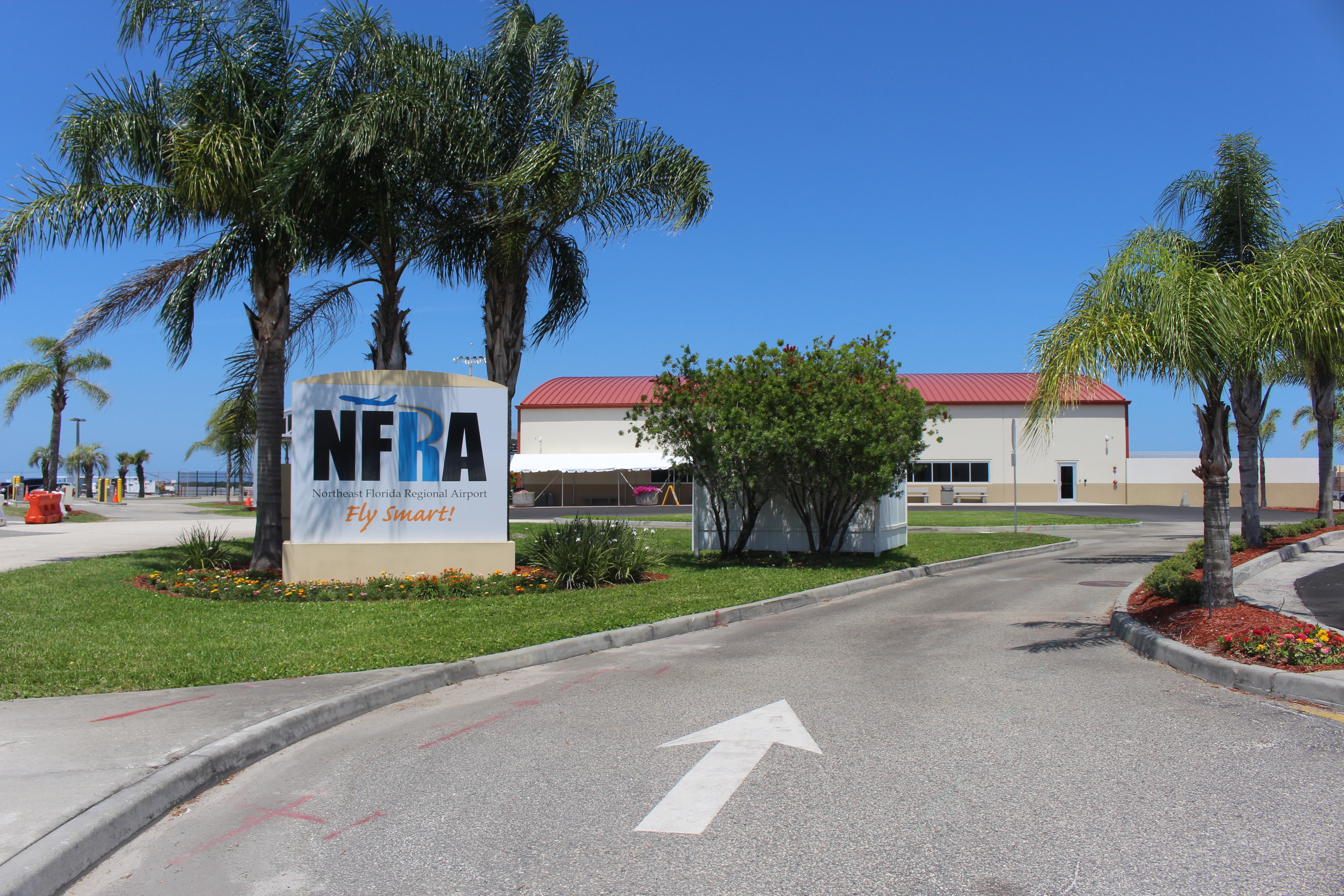
- IATA: UST; ICAO: KSGJ; FAA LID: SGJ

Summary
- Airport type: Public
- Owner: St. Augustine - St. Johns County Airport Authority
- Serves: St. Augustine, Florida
- Location: Unincorporated St. Johns County, near St. Augustine
- Elevation AMSL: 10 ft / 3 m
- Coordinates: 29°57′33.3″N 081°20′23″W
- Website: www.flynf.com

Maps
- FAA airport diagram
- Interactive map of Northeast Florida Regional Airport

Runways
| Direction | Length | | Surface |
| Direction | ft | m | Surface |
|---|---|---|---|
| 06/24 | 2,701 | 823 | Asphalt |
| 13/31 | 8,001 | 2,439 | Asphalt |
| 02/20 | 2,609 | 795 | Asphalt |

Statistics (2020)
- Aircraft operations (year ending 9/30/2020): 116,045
- Based aircraft: 228
- Source: FAA and airport website

Northeast Florida Regional Airport (IATA: UST, ICAO: KSGJ, FAA LID: SGJ), is located approximately four miles (6 km) north of historic St. Augustine, in St. Johns County, Florida, United States. NFRA serves as a key connection point for air travel in the Northeast Florida region. It is a public airport managed by the St. Johns County Airport Authority on behalf of the citizens of St. Johns County. Airport facilities include both commercial and general aviation terminals.

Most U.S. airports use the same three-letter location identifier for the FAA and IATA, but Northeast Florida Regional Airport is SGJ to the FAA and UST to the IATA (which assigned SGJ to Sagarai, Papua New Guinea).

== History ==
On December 27, 1933, the St. Augustine City Commission voted to buy 276 acres (1.12 km^{2}) in Araquay Park, north of the city, for $8,000 for conversion to a public airport. U.S. Government grants through the decade allowed improvements to the airfield, and after the outbreak of World War II in 1939 vast new sums were provided for possible military use.

After the December 7, 1941, attack on Pearl Harbor, civil aviation at the airfield was cancelled and the U.S. Navy took over the airport, renaming it Naval Auxiliary Air Station St. Augustine. Used as a satellite gunnery base in connection with training operations at nearby Naval Air Station Jacksonville, improvements were made to NAAS St. Augustine included additional runway and hangar construction, support facilities and a control tower. After the war, the Navy reduced operations, and in May 1946 the airport was returned to the city.

In the postwar period, government subsidies made possible the establishment of "feeder airlines" providing air service to smaller cities, with St. Augustine Airport becoming a scheduled stop for two passenger airlines. With cutbacks in subsidies the feeder airlines went out of business, and by 1950 the airport, with weeds growing through the cracks in the runway, was seen as a "white elephant" the city could ill afford to operate. It closed and was leased to the local Moose Lodge for $1.00 a year. Soon the white elephant became a bonanza - a major factor in the industrial development of St. Augustine and St. Johns County.

In June 1954, the Fairchild Engine and Airplane Corporation announced it would build an aircraft modification plant at the airport, opening the facility the following year. Soon military aircraft such as USAF C-119 and USMC R4Q Flying Boxcars and USAF and USCG C-123 Providers were arriving at Fairchild's St. Augustine facility. During the 1960s, C-119s would be modified as AC-119 gunships and C-123s into aerial spraying aircraft for U.S. Air Force units in Vietnam. Facilities expanded several times to meet Fairchild's requirements – the lengthening of Runway 13/31 to nearly 8,000 feet (2,400 m) for military jets was a direct result of such needs. Fairchild also operated a non-federal air traffic control tower in the former Navy control tower on a periodic basis.

In 1966, a terminal building and additional hangars were built, while fixed-base operations (FBO) were established and additional land acquired. In 1967, Ernie Moser incorporated Aero Sport as the airport's FBO and operated it along with his wife, Mary Alice, and son Jim. Ernie gained notoriety by landing a Piper Cub on the "World's Shortest Runway" a wooden platform on top of a Chevrolet van. His son Jim also became known for his flying of his prized aircraft, a Bücker Bü 133 Jungmeister. In January 2006, Diane Moser, the late Jim Moser's wife, sold the business to the Galaxy Aviation chain of FBOs, bringing to an end the Moser era.

In 1976, Fairchild Industries announced that it would close down its St. Augustine operations. An industrial park was later created at the Fairchild facilities, and in 1980 the industrial park was sold to the then-Grumman Corporation (now known as Northrop Grumman) for an aircraft modification plant that would ultimately service numerous front-line U.S. Navy and U.S. Marine Corps aircraft, to include the A-6 Intruder, EA-6B Prowler, C-1 Trader, C-2 Greyhound, E-2 Hawkeye and F-14 Tomcat. Grumman assumed responsibility for operating the air traffic control tower as required, maintaining emergency runway arresting gear systems for naval aircraft, and providing aircraft rescue and fire fighting capability (ARFF) for the airport. The Naval Air Systems Command also established Naval Plant Representative Office (NAVPRO) St. Augustine on site.

In 1986, in accordance with the Federal Aviation Regulations (FAR), the airport was awarded an FAR Part 139 operating certification by the Federal Aviation Administration (FAA), enabling the airport to operate scheduled and charter airline aircraft carrying more than 35 passengers. This certification process increased airport safety and made the airport eligible for federal grant money under the FAA's Airport Improvement Program (AIP). The airport was designated a "reliever airport" for general aviation overflow from Jacksonville International Airport.

In the mid-1980s, Grumman St. Augustine was tasked with a major military contract for "re-winging" nearly all A-6 Intruder carrier-based medium attack bombers for the U.S. Navy and U.S. Marine Corps. In 1989, Grumman undertook large construction projects at the airport, to include construction of their "North 40" facility in support of a Federal Express Boeing 727 modification contract. Grumman, along with the Airport Authority, also built a facility to house the U.S. Coast Guard's E-2C Hawkeyes, which was named Coast Guard Air Station St. Augustine. At this point, the airport technically became a joint civil-military facility, while CGAS St. Augustine operated for two years with E-2C aircraft on loan from the Navy, patrolling along the eastern U.S. coast line, the Gulf of Mexico and throughout the Caribbean as part of drug interdiction operations. However, following a fatal aircraft mishap involving a Coast Guard E-2C at Naval Station Roosevelt Roads, Puerto Rico in late August 1990, the USCG E-2C program was terminated, CGAS St. Augustine disestablished and the military facility returned to the control of Grumman.

Airport improvements continued into the 1990s. 1994 saw the completion of remodeling and expansion of the airport's terminal building, adding office space, a pilot briefing area, pilot lounge with shower facilities, ticket counters with nearby waiting and baggage areas for eventual commuter/regional airline service, conference facilities and a second-story facility for a restaurant. The Fly-By Cafe opened its doors in 1997 offering a second-story view of the airfield, a menu of aviation-themed dishes, and colorful murals of airplane and airshow memorabilia.

The late 1990s also saw numerous mergers among U.S. defense contractors, with the Grumman Corporation being acquired by the Northrop Corporation in 1994 to become Northrop Grumman, the name it continues to use today as the airport's major aviation and industrial activity and largest single employer. Today, the Northrop Grumman facility is best known as the manufacturing and production site for the U.S. Navy's E-2D Advanced Hawkeye carrier-based airborne early warning aircraft, said production having been relocated from the company's previous production site on Long Island, New York.

Through the 1980s and 1990s the airport added over 100 hangars for single and twin-engine airplanes and currently has over 200 based aircraft. Although the airport ceased to be a joint civil-military airport with the departure of the Coast Guard, military flight operations continue for Northrop Grumman and the Department of Defense's (DoD's) Defense Contract Management Agency (DCMA). The U.S. Army's Detachment 1, Company B, 3rd Battalion, 135th Aviation Regiment (previously Operational Support Aircraft Command (OSACOM) Detachment 8) is permanently based at the airport, composed of Army National Guard personnel and providing airlift support with C-12 Huron aircraft to Headquarters, Florida National Guard, to include colocated headquarters activities of the Florida Army National Guard and Florida Air National Guard.

In 2007, a 10,000-square-foot (930 m^{2}) terminal building was constructed.

The airport was renamed the Northeast Florida Regional Airport in April 2010.

The Airport Authority staff currently numbers 11 employees tasked with administration and maintenance of the airport, while the airport's control tower was passed from a periodic operation by Northrop Grumman to a full-time operation as a Level I Air Traffic Control Tower under the auspices of the FAA's Contract Tower Program. The air traffic control tower controls a Class D Airspace service area, within a four nautical miles (7.4 km; 4.6 mi) radius around the field, and up to 2,500 ft (760 m).

In 2016, a new 23,305-square-foot (2,165.1 m^{2}) terminal building was constructed to handle increased passenger service and can accommodate four passenger gates. The terminal building has car rental counters within the facility for Avis, Enterprise and Hertz, and convenient parking lots directly adjacent to the airline terminal.

Frontier Airlines launched successful air service between St. Augustine, Florida, and Trenton, New Jersey, on May 2, 2014, and expanded service to include Philadelphia and Chicago in 2016. Despite the popularity of these flights, Frontier Airlines suspended air service in 2017, referencing a focus on Jacksonville and aircraft availability in the coming year.

Via Air began air service on December 18, 2014, between St. Augustine, Florida, and Charlotte, North Carolina (CLT), and continued to service the Northeast Florida market through November 2018.

In April 2019, Northrop Grumman was awarded a contract amendment of $3.2 billion from the U.S. Navy for the production of the E-2D Advanced Hawkeye, manufactured in St. Augustine. In October 2019, the United States Department of Defense authorized a foreign military sales contract of $1.4 billion authorizing the production and sale of an additional nine E-2D Advanced Hawkeye to the Japanese Air Self-Defense Force.

Avelo Airlines expressed interest in launching service to St. Augustine in 2023, but subsequently withdrew after failing to reach a deal with the airport.

== Facilities ==
The airport covers 668 acres (270 ha) and has three runways and three seaplane lanes:

- 13/31: 8,001 ft × 150 ft (2,439 m × 46 m), surface: asphalt
- 06/24: 2,701 ft × 60 ft (823 m × 18 m), surface: asphalt
- 02/20: 2,609 ft × 75 ft (795 m × 23 m), surface: asphalt

In the year ending September 30, 2020, the airport had 116,045 aircraft operations, average 318 per day: 93% general aviation, 2% military, 5% air taxi and less than 1% scheduled commercial. 228 aircraft were then based at the airport: 155 single engine, 22 military, 29 multi-engine, 17 jet aircraft, and 5 helicopter.

== Communications ==
- Tower/CTAF/pilot controlled lighting – 127.625 MHz (269.475 MHz – tower only)
- Ground – 121.175 MHz (251.125 MHz)
- ATIS – 119.625 MHz
- FBO (Atlantic Aviation) – 130.05 MHz

== See also ==
- List of airports in Florida
