= Elite Airways =

Defunct airline of the United States (2006–2022)

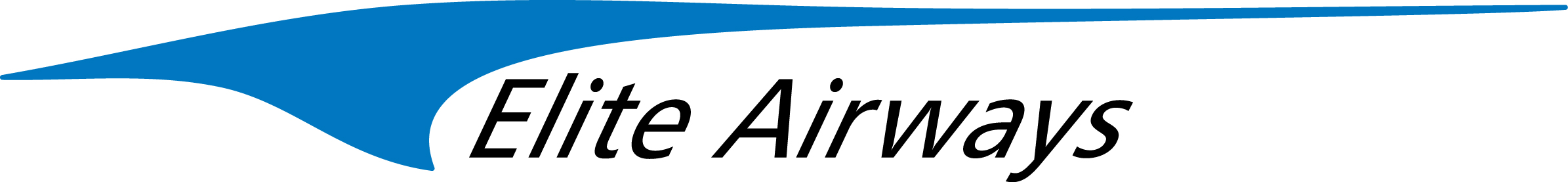
IATA	ICAO	Call sign
7Q	MNU	MAINER
- Founded: 2006; 19 years ago
- Commenced operations: July 28, 2014; 11 years ago
- Ceased operations: July 2022; 3 years ago
- AOC #: 19EA891L
- Operating bases: Melbourne/Orlando; Portland (ME)
- Fleet size: 11
- Destinations: 4
- Headquarters: Portland, Maine, U.S.
- Website: res.eliteairways.net

Elite Airways was an airline based in the United States that operated charter and scheduled passenger flights. The airline was headquartered in Portland, Maine.

== History ==
Elite Airways LLC was founded in 2006 and received FAA Part 121 scheduled certification in 2012. When the airline obtained its scheduled authority it announced it would begin scheduled passenger flights to and from Melbourne Orlando International Airport, the airline's operating base; the first scheduled passenger route was announced on July 28, 2014, when the airline said it would begin twice-weekly services between Melbourne and Washington Dulles International Airport on September 8 that year. Flights went on sale August 25, 2014 utilizing Branson Air Express as the ticketing airline. In November the airline began operating the Branson Air Express flights from Branson Airport to Chicago Midway Airport and Houston Hobby Airport.

The airline announced that service from Northern Colorado's Fort Collins-Loveland Airport to both Newark Liberty International Airport and Chicago Rockford International Airport would begin on August 27, 2015. The airline subsequently announced flights starting December 10, 2015 from Vero Beach Municipal Airport to Newark Liberty International Airport, representing the first-ever commercial scheduled jet service at Vero Beach airport.

In early 2016, Elite Airways introduced scheduled service from Naples Municipal Airport in southwest Florida to Newark Liberty, Melbourne Orlando, Vero Beach and Portland International Jetport in Maine, representing the first commercial services at Naples Municipal Airport since 2006. In March 2016, the airline announced the restart of twice-weekly service between Fort Collins-Loveland Municipal Airport and Chicago Rockford International Airport starting May 23, 2016. On April 15, 2016, the airline announced that it would begin regular flight operations at Long Island MacArthur Airport in Islip, New York. The airline announced service to three destinations: Orlando-Melbourne, Florida; Myrtle Beach, South Carolina; and Portland, Maine. Flight service began at Long Island MacArthur Airport the morning of June 17, 2016 On December 7, 2016, the airline announced it would begin non-stop service from Long Island to Newport News, Virginia beginning in March 2017, and on December 13, 2016, the airline announced plans to further expand service from Long Island MacArthur Airport to Vero Beach, FL.

Beginning April 27, 2017, Elite Airways begins its first international service, flying between Melbourne Orlando International Airport and South Bimini Airport in The Bahamas.

Beginning September 28, 2017, Elite Airways began doing business as Cal Jet Elite, and flew between McClellan-Palomar Airport in Carlsbad, California and McCarran International Airport in Las Vegas, Nevada. Cal Jet and Elite provided irregular service, frequently canceling flights and stranding travelers. The service was quietly ceased by the airline in April 2018, and Elite Airways has not made an announcement on whether or not to maintain the Cal Jet route. As of June 20, it is not possible to book flights on the official website.

In 2018 the airline refocused its scheduled operations on the core Newark & Portland to Florida flights and has since added flights from Florida to Asheville, North Carolina and Traverse City, Michigan.

On August 6, 2019, it was announced that Elite Airways signed an operating agreement to provide the initial aircraft, flight crews, and maintenance service for the revival of the Midwest Express brand. On September 18, 2022, BizTimes.com reported that Midwest Express had terminated the agreement and was bringing suit.

In 2019, Elite Airways opened a dedicated maintenance facility at Auburn/Lewiston Municipal Airport. In 2019 Elite Airways also ceased scheduled service to Melbourne-Orlando, which it had served since it began scheduled passenger service.

In 2020, Vero Beach, Florida city council recommended terminating Elite's lease at Vero Beach Regional Airport due to a funding gap from Florida Department of Transportation as Elite's passenger's numbers had exceeded 10,000 but less than 200,000. The city council ultimately extended the lease while trying to work out a longer-term solution.

In 2021, Elite began building its operations at Westchester County Airport by adding new destinations like the islands of Martha's Vineyard and Nantucket located south of Cape Cod, and later adding routes to its destinations in Florida and Maine. In Martha's Vineyard it is the first carrier to operate jet service to Westchester County Airport. Nantucket Memorial Airport has had jet service to Westchester County Airport from JetBlue since 2019. Cape Air has also flown to both islands from Westchester County Airport since 2011, but it is using nine seat piston engine aircraft. Beginning November 2021, Elite will operate flights twice weekly between Newark, New Jersey and St. Augustine (Florida) Regional Airport.

According to VeroNews.com as of July 14, 2022, the carrier had cancelled all of its scheduled July service at Vero Beach in addition to 27 of the 35 flights for June, due to the expiration of a TSA waiver.

Elite suspended all scheduled and charter flights in July of 2022. In October 2023, it was reported that the DOT had revoked Elite's operating authority.

== Fleet ==
As of January 2022, Elite Airways operated an all-CRJ fleet composed of the following aircraft:

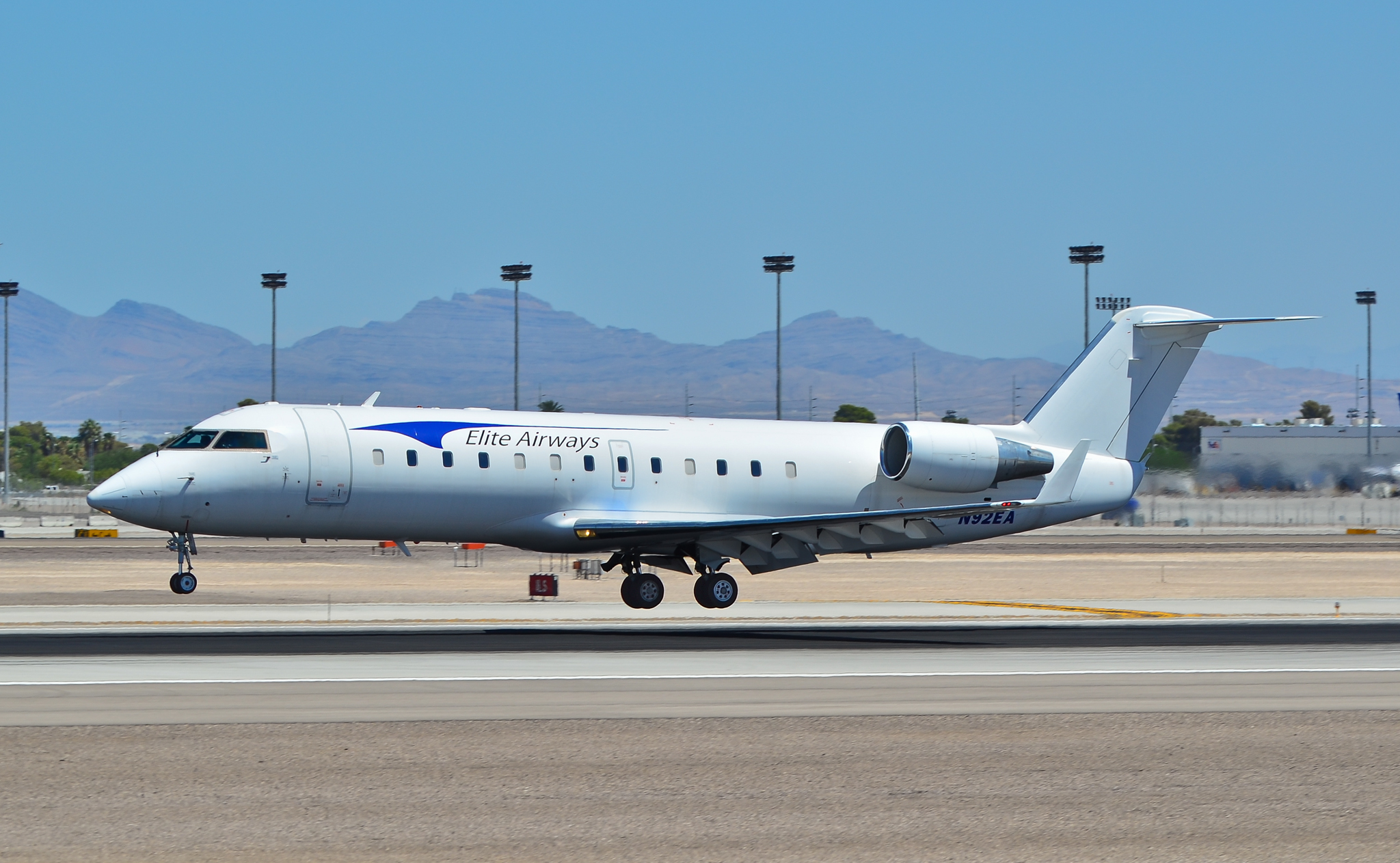
Elite Airways CRJ 200ER

Elite Airways Fleet
Aircraft	In Service	Orders	Notes
Bombardier CRJ200ER	1	—	In a Corporate 16 seat configuration
Bombardier CRJ200LR	6	—	
Bombardier CRJ701ER	3	—	All CRJ700 were previously owned by Lufthansa CityLine, one aircraft stored, one aircraft leased to Air Wisconsin for fleet familiarization, which was then transferred to GoJet Airlines to be converted to a CRJ550.
Bombardier CRJ900LR	1	—	
Total	11	—	

== Destinations ==
Elite Airways operated both charter and scheduled operations. Charter operations were primarily NCAA charters, music tours, and other ACMI operations flying throughout North & Central America, and the Caribbean.

=== Former destinations ===
City	Airport	IATA Code	Destinations	Notes
United States
Arizona
Bullhead City/Laughlin (Nevada)	Laughlin/Bullhead International Airport	IFP	Phoenix	
Phoenix	Sky Harbor International Airport	PHX	Bullhead City Rochester	
California
Carlsbad	McClellan–Palomar Airport	CRQ	Las Vegas	
Colorado
Denver	Denver International Airport	DEN	Branson (Seasonal)	
Fort Collins	Fort Collins–Loveland Municipal Airport	FNL	Chicago-Rockford	
Florida
Key West	Key West International Airport	EYW	Melbourne (Florida)	
Melbourne	Melbourne Orlando International Airport	MLB	Bimini Key West Long Island/Islip Washington-Dulles	
Naples	Naples Municipal Airport	APF	Newark Melbourne-Orlando Portland (Maine)	
Sarasota	Sarasota–Bradenton International Airport	SRQ	Portland (Maine) Traverse City White Plains	
St. Augustine	Northeast Florida Regional Airport	UST	Newark Portland	
Vero Beach	Vero Beach Regional Airport	VRB	Newark Portland	
Illinois
Chicago	Midway International Airport	MDW	Branson	
Rockford	Chicago Rockford International Airport	RFD	Fort Collins	
Louisiana
New Orleans	Louis Armstrong New Orleans International Airport	MSY	Branson Cancun (Seasonal)	
Maine
Bar Harbor	Hancock County-Bar Harbor Airport	BHB	Newark Portland (Maine)	
Portland	Portland International Jetport	PWM	St. Augustine Vero Beach	
Massachusetts
New Bedford	New Bedford Regional Airport	EWB	Vero Beach	
Martha's Vineyard	Martha's Vineyard Airport	MVY	White Plains	
Nantucket	Nantucket Memorial Airport	ACK	White Plains	
Michigan
Traverse City	Cherry Capital Airport	TVC	Sarasota	
Missouri
Branson	Branson Airport	BKG	Cancun (Seasonal) Cincinnati Denver Houston-Intercontinental New Orleans	
Nevada
Las Vegas	McCarran International Airport	LAS	Carlsbad	
New Jersey
Newark	Newark Liberty International Airport	EWR	St. Augustine Vero Beach	
(New York (state)) New York
Albany	Albany International Airport	ALB	Myrtle Beach	
Long Island/Islip	Long Island MacArthur Airport	ISP	Melbourne-Orlando	
Westchester County	Westchester County Airport	HPN	Vero Beach	
North Carolina
Asheville	Asheville Regional Airport	AVL	Vero Beach (Seasonal)	
Ohio
Cincinnati	Cincinnati/Northern Kentucky International Airport	CVG	Branson	
Pennsylvania
Pittsburgh	Pittsburgh International Airport	PIT	Sarasota	
South Carolina
Myrtle Beach	Myrtle Beach International Airport	MYR	Albany Newport News	
Texas
Houston	George Bush Intercontinental Airport	IAH	Branson	B
Virginia
Washington, D.C.	Washington Dulles International Airport	IAD	Melbourne-Orlando	
(The Bahamas) Bahamas
Bimini	South Bimini Airport	BIM	Melbourne Newark (Seasonal)	
Canada
Halifax	Halifax Stanfield International Airport	YHZ	Portland (ME)	
Mexico
Cancún	Cancún International Airport	CUN	Branson (Seasonal) New Orleans (Seasonal)	
