= The Conco Companies =

- Trade name: Conco
- Type: Private
- Industry: Commercial concrete services, Construction
- Founded: 1959; 67 years ago in California's Bay Area
- Founder: Matt Gonsalves, Gerald Santucci, Ray Santucci, Will Gonsalves, and Mel Gonsalves
- Headquarters: Concord, California, United States
- Number of locations: 4
- Area served: Western United States
- Key people: Matt Gonsalves (Chairman of the Board); Steve Gonsalves (President and CEO)
- Products: Rebar fabrication, post-tension systems
- Services: Concrete building design, Formwork, Reinforcement, Shotcrete, Pumping, Place and finish
- Website: conconow.com

The Conco Companies are providers of commercial concrete services headquartered in Concord, CA. They have four regional offices in the Western United States that serve the surrounding areas of San Francisco, Los Angeles, San Jose, Sacramento, Seattle, Portland, Reno, Denver, and Colorado Springs.[1] Conco provides a full range of concrete services for public works projects, commercial, parking structures, educational, and other construction development.

== History ==
In 1959, Conco was founded by Matt Gonsalves, Gerald Santucci, Ray Santucci, Will Gonsalves, and Mel Gonsalves and first began offering commercial concrete services in California's Bay Area. Matt Gonsalves, one of the original founders and former president, is still involved with the company and serves as the chairman of the board. Gonsalves was instrumental in initiating the formation of the Concrete Contractors Association and has served as president of the Building Industry of America (BIA). In 2000, he was inducted into the California Building Industry Foundation Hall of Fame. [2]

The current president and CEO of Conco Companies is Steve Gonsalves. Under his leadership, Conco has expanded their products, services and geographic range. Gonsalves is an active member of the Building Industry of America, the Concrete Contractors Association, the Home Builders Association, the Engineering & Utility Contractors Association, and the American Concrete Pumping Association as well as serving on the board of several charities. [3]

== Range of services ==
Conco provides concrete services for the Western U.S. that include professional concrete building design, formwork, reinforcement, shotcrete, pumping, and place and finish. In addition, Conco is one of the largest independent reinforcing steel and post tension contractors on the West Coast, with state-of-the-art rebar fabrication facilities in Benicia, CA and Rochester, WA.

Since 1975, Conco has become one of the largest concrete pumping companies in the U.S., and has developed the required resources to customize concrete pumping for the most challenging projects. In an effort to improve the air quality at jobsites, Conco was one of the first companies on the West Coast to invest in long boom pumps that met all of the newest emissions standards. They have pumping equipment located in Northern California, Southern California and Washington State.

Recently Conco has taken a role in the developing field of sculpted shotcrete, which is the use of concrete as a canvas to create shotcrete walls that have structural integrity but are aesthetically pleasing. Shotcrete provides an excellent alternative to traditional cast-in-place walls, and since it is pneumatically placed, greatly reduces labor cost and time.

== Notable projects ==
Conco's portfolio includes involvement on many renowned construction projects throughout the Western U.S. A prime example is on February 15, 2014, Conco broke the Guinness World Record for the largest continuous mat pour to date in just 18 1/2 hours. The event was verified by an official Guinness World Records adjudicator who was on site during the pour. [4]

The massive mat pour required a fleet of 227 trucks that made 10 to 14 concrete drops for a total of 2,100 trips. Conco used eighteen concrete boom pumps strategically located around the site to place 82 million pounds of concrete to complete an almost 20-foot-thick foundation. The mat pour was for the new Wilshire Grand Center that is being built by the Turner Construction Company in downtown Los Angeles and is slated to become the tallest building in the U.S. west of the Mississippi. [5]

In the summer of 2013, Conco was retained by the general contractor, American Bridge/Fluor Enterprises, Inc. JV, to assist on the repair of 32 anchor rods on the eastern span of the new Bay Bridge in San Francisco, CA. A permanent fix was designed that involved a complex series of steel saddles and post-tensioned jacket walls that were used to provide the required clamping force to secure the bridge deck framing to the E2 crossbeam. The concrete jacket wall structures were placed in three pours totaling 380 cubic yards. Due to restricted access and rebar congestion, much of the concrete was pumped 250 feet and then injected into the forms through ports at strategic locations. [6]

In 2012, Conco was awarded the concrete contract for the new $1.2 billion San Francisco 49ers Levi Stadium. The scope of the project called for extensive concrete work that consisted of slabs in excess of 2,000,000 square feet and used more than 65,000 cubic yards of concrete to complete. In order to meet the demands of the ambitious timeline for completion of the foundation, Conco worked in four separate areas simultaneously. The same approach was taken for the many deck pours that needed to be done. The Levi Stadium is another Turner Construction project and opened in the fall of 2014. [7]

Another significant project was the parking structure for the Nokia Theater L.A. LIVE + project in Los Angeles, CA that opened in 2007. Anschutz Entertainment Group (AEG) was the primary developer of the project that had a total cost of $2.5 billion. Conco's contribution was to build the two-story below-grade parking structure that provided the structural support for the complex. One of the several awards the project received for design and construction elements included the Excellence in Concrete Award from the American Concrete Institute – Southern California Chapter. [8]

- Wilshire Grand Center, Los Angeles, CA
- Bay Bridge Repair, San Francisco, CA
- San Francisco 49ers Levi's Stadium, Santa Clara, CA
- 815 Pine St, Seattle, WA
- Los Angeles Hall of Justice, Los Angeles, CA
- Kaiser San Leandro Medical Center, San Leandro, CA
- UCSF Neurosciences Lab and Research Center, San Francisco, CA
- John Muir Medical Center Phase IV, Walnut Creek, CA
- Solyndra, Fremont, CA
- United Spiral Pipe, Pittsburgh, CA
- Napa Riverfront, Napa, CA
- Nokia Theater L.A. LIVE + Parking Structure, Los Angeles, CA
- Mineta Airport, San Jose, CA
- 717 9th Street, Los Angeles, CA
- Washington Square, Bellevue, WA
- The Ashton, Bellevue, WA
- Inland Empire Energy Center, Romoland, CA
- Island Market Square, Mercer Island, WA
- Caltrans District 7 Headquarters Replacement Building, Los Angeles, CA

== Certifications ==
- CARB Certificate
- Stud Rail Fabrication
