= M. Graham Clark Downtown Airport =

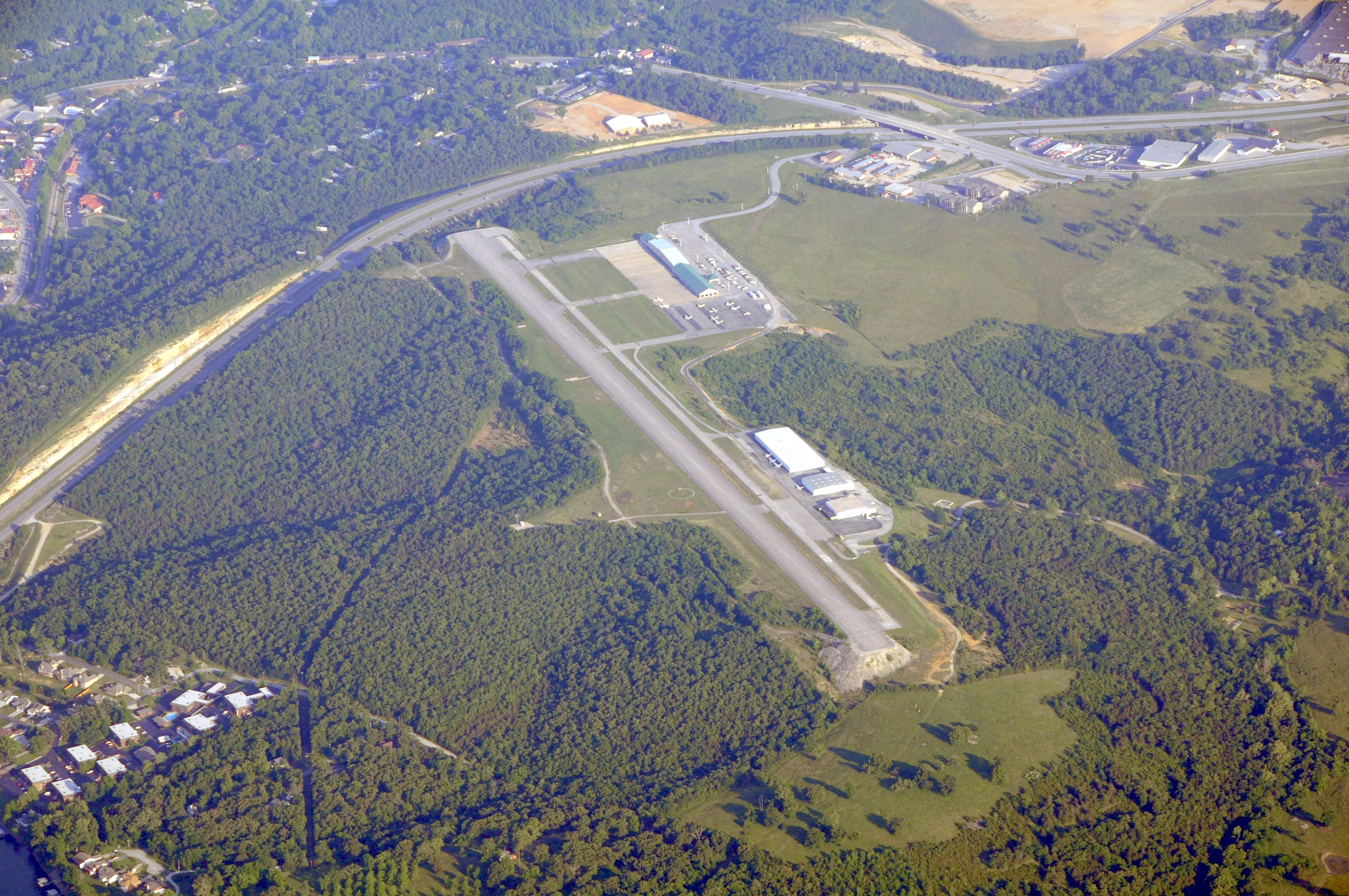
- Aerial view, June 2009
- IATA: PLK; ICAO: KPLK; FAA LID: PLK

Summary
- Airport type: Public
- Owner/Operator: Taney County, Missouri
- Serves: Branson / Hollister
- Location: Branson, Missouri
- Elevation AMSL: 940 ft / 287 m
- Coordinates: 36°37′33″N 093°13′44″W

Map
- Location of airport in Missouri PLK (the United States)

Runways
Direction	Length		Surface
Direction	ft	m	Surface
12/30	3,738	1,139	Asphalt

Statistics (2011)
- Aircraft operations: 11,200
- Based aircraft: 68
- Sources: Airport and FAA

M. Graham Clark Downtown Airport (IATA: PLK, ICAO: KPLK, FAA LID: PLK) is a county-owned, public-use airport in Taney County, Missouri, United States. It is located one nautical mile (2 km) south of the central business district of Branson, Missouri, one nautical mile (2 km) northeast of Point Lookout, Missouri, and a few yards west of the old downtown area of Hollister, Missouri. It was formerly known as M. Graham Clark Field – Taney County Airport.

== History ==
M. Graham Clark Field was originally developed as a private airport by the College of the Ozarks for use in their aviation science department, and was originally officially associated with the village of Point Lookout, Missouri, a small village on a bluff overlooking the White River Valley which was later completely bought out and overwhelmed by the development of the college. The airport identifier, PLK, was based on the name of the town officially associated with the facility under a federal grant through which the college originally developed the airport.

The airport was named after M. Graham Clark, the president of the college at the time the airport was originally constructed.

College of the Ozarks closed down its aviation science department in 2003. Shortly thereafter, the airport was donated by the college to Taney County so that the Branson and Hollister community would not lose its important general aviation airport.

A private entity had contracted with the college to provide commercial airline service to Clark Field, serving Branson, in the late 1990s, but the venture failed and the terminal building, fire department building, and associated ramp were turned over to the college. The airport currently does not have any scheduled commercial airline service. Since the opening of the newly developed Branson Airport and the construction of new terminal facilities at the Springfield-Branson National Airport there is no expectation of future airline service at Clark Field.

=== Past airline service ===
According to the Official Airline Guide (OAG) as well as this airline's timetable, Branson Airlines was operating scheduled passenger service into M.G. Clark Field (PLK) in 1993-1994 with 50-passenger seat de Havilland Canada DHC-7 Dash 7 four engine turboprop aircraft with this air carrier's May 1, 1993 timetable listing service from Dallas/Fort Worth, Kansas City, Nashville and St. Louis and the January 1, 1994 OAG flight guide listing daily nonstop service from Dallas/Fort Worth (DFW), Kansas City (MCI) and St. Louis (STL). The Dash 7 has short takeoff and landing (STOL) capabilities as the runway at M.G. Clark Field is relatively short. Following the cessation of service by Branson Airlines at M.G. Clark Field, one of its Dash 7 aircraft was moved to Europe where it was then used for flight operations at the Palma de Mallorca Airport in Spain.

== Name confusion ==
The airport was named after a person, M. Graham Clark, and the donation agreement between the college and the county calls for the airport to always be named M. Graham Clark Field, though it is usually referred to as Clark Field, or simply as "Clark." The official Facilities Directory lists the airport under the name of the town it was originally officially associated with, Point Lookout, so some pilots will refer to the airport as "Point Lookout." The Kansas City Sectional Chart depicts the airport as "Clark–Taney County", but on two lines, so some pilots refer to it as "Clark County." Some local pilots refer to it as "Taney County." Some transient pilots associating the airport with the principal city of Branson refer to it as "Branson," despite the proximity of the newly developed Branson Airport about eight miles to the southeast. Most recently, there has been a proposal to officially rename the airport as "M. Graham Clark Branson Downtown Taney County Airport" as a marketing move to attract some of the low end corporate traffic from nearby Boone County Airport or the Branson Airport. Although the airport board has never adopted the proposal, many local pilots pushing for the change have been referring to the airport as "Branson Downtown" or simply "Downtown". The use of so many names for the same airport has also been known to cause radio confusion in dense traffic. It is not unusual for approaching traffic making an initial call to refer to the airport as "Clark Point Lookout Branson Downtown Taney County . . ." in an attempt to be specific, and use a shorter name on subsequent calls.

== Facilities and aircraft ==
M. Graham Clark Downtown Airport covers an area of 40 acres (16 ha) at an elevation of 940 feet (287 m) above mean sea level. It has one runway designated 12/30 with an asphalt surface measuring 3,738 by 100 feet (1,139 x 30 m). A GPS approach is published and the runway provides both Medium Intensity Runway Lights (MIRL) and Runway End Identifier Lights (REIL).

For the 12-month period ending December 31, 2011, the airport had 11,200 aircraft operations, an average of 30 per day: 96% general aviation, 4% air taxi, and <1% military. At that time there were 68 aircraft based at this airport: 78% single-engine, 13% multi-engine, 2% jet, and 7% helicopter.

The FBO is operated by the Taney County Airport Board. Repair services are available from Branson Aircraft Repair, LLC. Helicopter charter, touring, and flight training are offered, as well.

=== General aviation traffic ===
Clark Field has at times been one of the busiest general aviation airports in the region. It was at one time ranked the fourth busiest airport by number of aircraft operations in the state of Missouri behind Lambert-St. Louis International Airport, Kansas City Downtown Airport, and Spirit of St. Louis Airport, outranking Kansas City International Airport and Springfield-Branson National Airport. The airport serves helicopter operations. Also, there is a substantial antique airplane collector on the field and the field is popular with other operators flying aircraft without radios. There is no control tower as it is an uncontrolled field. It is not uncommon for there to be several aircraft in the pattern at the same time.

=== Prevailing winds ===
The direction of the prevailing winds are typically from the north or from the southwest. The runway was constructed west-northwest and east-southeast due to the terrain, creating a prevailing crosswind. This "built-in crosswind" was considered a desired attribute when the airport was used to train pilots, allowing them to obtain extensive crosswind procedure training, although there were several relatively minor crosswind accidents.

=== 2011 runway changes ===
Around March 10, 2011, the runway numbers at M. Graham Clark Field were changed from 11/29 to 12/30.

== Incidents ==
This airport was free of any fatal accident history for several decades, but there have been a few fatal accidents associated with the field in recent years, including:

- A CitationJet (Cessna-525, or CJ1) crashed on approach to the airport in winter 1999. Approach Control had lost radar contact with the aircraft at 2,100 feet msl five miles from the airport. The crash occurred on a mountaintop about four miles west of the airport at about 1,100 feet msl "within 50 feet of the centerline of the instrument approach" but at an altitude several hundred feet below what was specified for that portion of the approach. There was significant public controversy associated with this accident. The aircraft was owned by the College of the Ozarks (which owned the airport at the time) and six employees and students of the college were killed. The pilot was also the airport manager and an administrator associated with the aviation science department of the college. Pilot fatigue was cited as a factor in the accident by the NTSB, possibly aggravated by toxicological factors and an alleged "feud" that the pilot was having with the FAA in the days leading up to the accident. It is thought that this accident was a factor in the decision by the college to phase out its aviation science department and donate the airport to the county.
- A Piper Cherokee Six (PA-32) based in Texas crashed in a ravine and burned, killing all five occupants, after a balked take-off that overran the east end of the field in 2004.
- A Piper PA-34 Seneca also based in Texas crashed and burned after departure a few miles from the field (thought to be attempting to return to the airport for unknown reasons) in low weather, killing all four occupants, in 2006.
- A homebuilt Tri-Q2 from Florida crashed shortly after departing the field in 2006. The cause was thought to be due to structural problems with the aircraft.

Other incidents at the airport include:

- On January 12, 2014, Southwest Airlines flight 4013 from Midway Airport in Chicago, a Boeing 737-700, landed at Clark Field (on Runway 12) apparently in error instead of at the nearby Branson Airport (on Runway 14). The runway at Clark Field is only 3,738 feet in length, more than 3,000 feet shorter than the runway at the intended airport. The Boeing 737 carried 124 passengers and 5 crew members, and it was reported to have landed "safely and without incident". The aircraft was able to take off again the next day, after all passenger seats were removed and the aircraft was fueled minimally for a nearby Southwest facility.

== See also ==
- Boone County Airport (Arkansas)
- Branson Airport
- Branson West Airport
- List of airports in Missouri
