= Air Alsie =

Danish airline

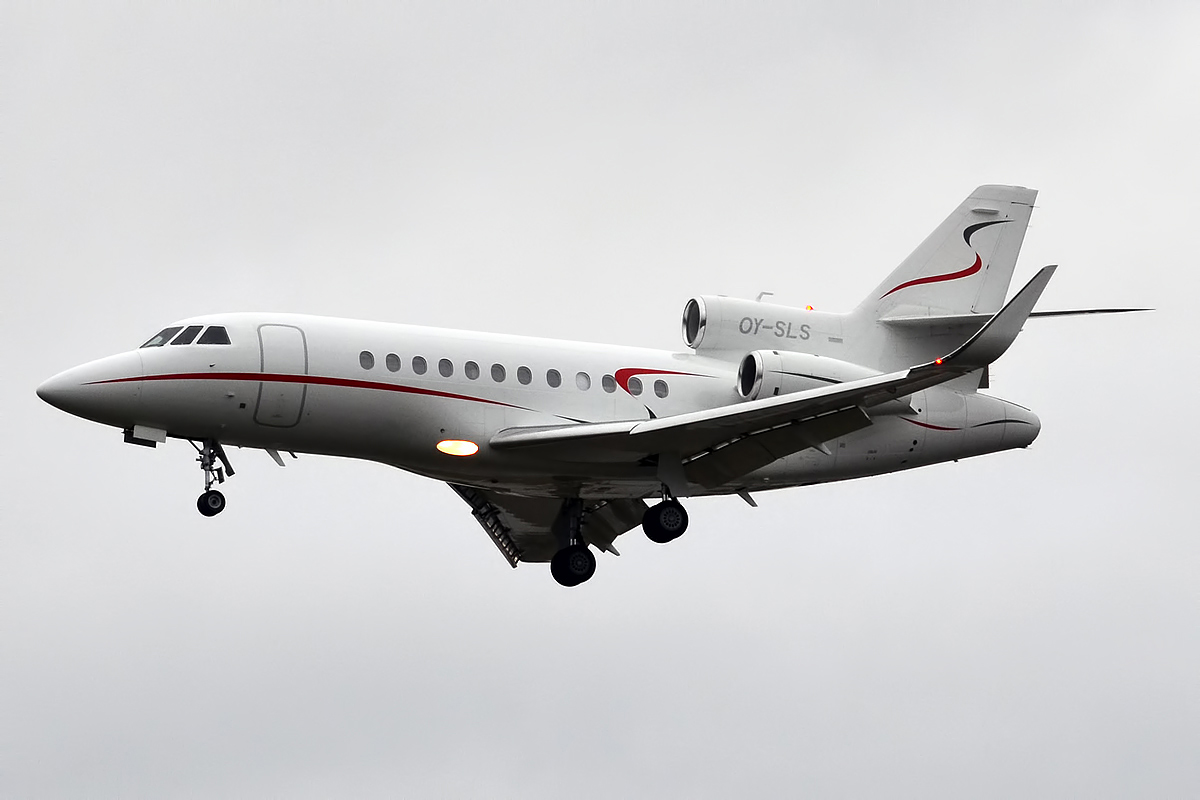
- Dassault Falcon 900
IATA	ICAO	Call sign
6I	MMD	MERMAID
- Founded: 1989
- Hubs: Sønderborg Airport
- Fleet size: 19
- Headquarters: Sønderborg, Denmark
- Website: alsie.com

Air Alsie is a Danish charter airline headquartered in Sønderborg and based at Sønderborg Airport, which operates VIP and business services.

== Destinations ==
Air Alsie operates all scheduled services for its sister brand Alsie Express. It has operated normal passenger service between Sønderborg and Copenhagen since 2012, and in April 2026, Alsie Express startet flying between Karup and Copenhagen as well.

Since August 2020, Air Alsie also operated scheduled flights on behalf of Lübeck Airport for the virtual airline Lübeck Air to Munich and Stuttgart - and from January 2021 also to Bern and Salzburg - as there had been no scheduled operations in Lübeck for several years. In March 2023, Lübeck Air announced it would end ATR flights and try to continue operations with another jetliners-equipped airline thus ending its affiliation with Air Alsie.

== Fleet ==
As of October 2026, the Air Alsie fleet consists of the following aircraft:

Air Alsie Fleet
Aircraft	Total	Orders	Passengers	Notes
ATR 72-500	2 (as of July 2026)	1	48/64	in Alsie Express colours
Dassault Falcon 6X	2	-		
Dassault Falcon 7X	7	—		
Dassault Falcon 8X	2	—		
Dassault Falcon 2000LXS	4	—		
Pilatus PC-12NG	1			
Total	18	1		
