= Naviair =

Company in Denmark

NAVIAIR

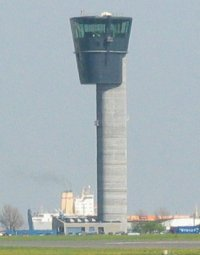
- Company type: State owned
- Industry: Air Navigation Service Provider
- Founded: 2001
- Headquarters: Copenhagen, Denmark
- Area served: Denmark; Faroe Islands; Greenland
- Key people: Anders Rex (CEO); Mads Kvist Eriksen (CFO)
- Parent: Danish Ministry of Transport
- Website: www.naviair.dk

Naviair (Navigation Via Air) is a state-owned company in Denmark under the Ministry of Transport that provides air traffic service, including area control service for the Danish airspace and approach control for airports in Copenhagen, Roskilde, Aalborg, Billund, Esbjerg, and Rønne. It provides flight information service in the lower airspace of Greenland and the Faroe Islands. It provides flight information service for visual flight rules and for helicopters.

Naviair was created on 1 January 2001 through a split of the Danish Civil Aviation Administration (Statens Luftfartsvæsen) into a regulator (SLV) and an ANS provider (Naviair).

The chief executive officer was Carsten Fich from May 2018 until July 2022. Currently, the CEO is Anders Rex.
