= Lübeck Airport =

Airport in Germany

Lübeck Airport Flughafen Lübeck
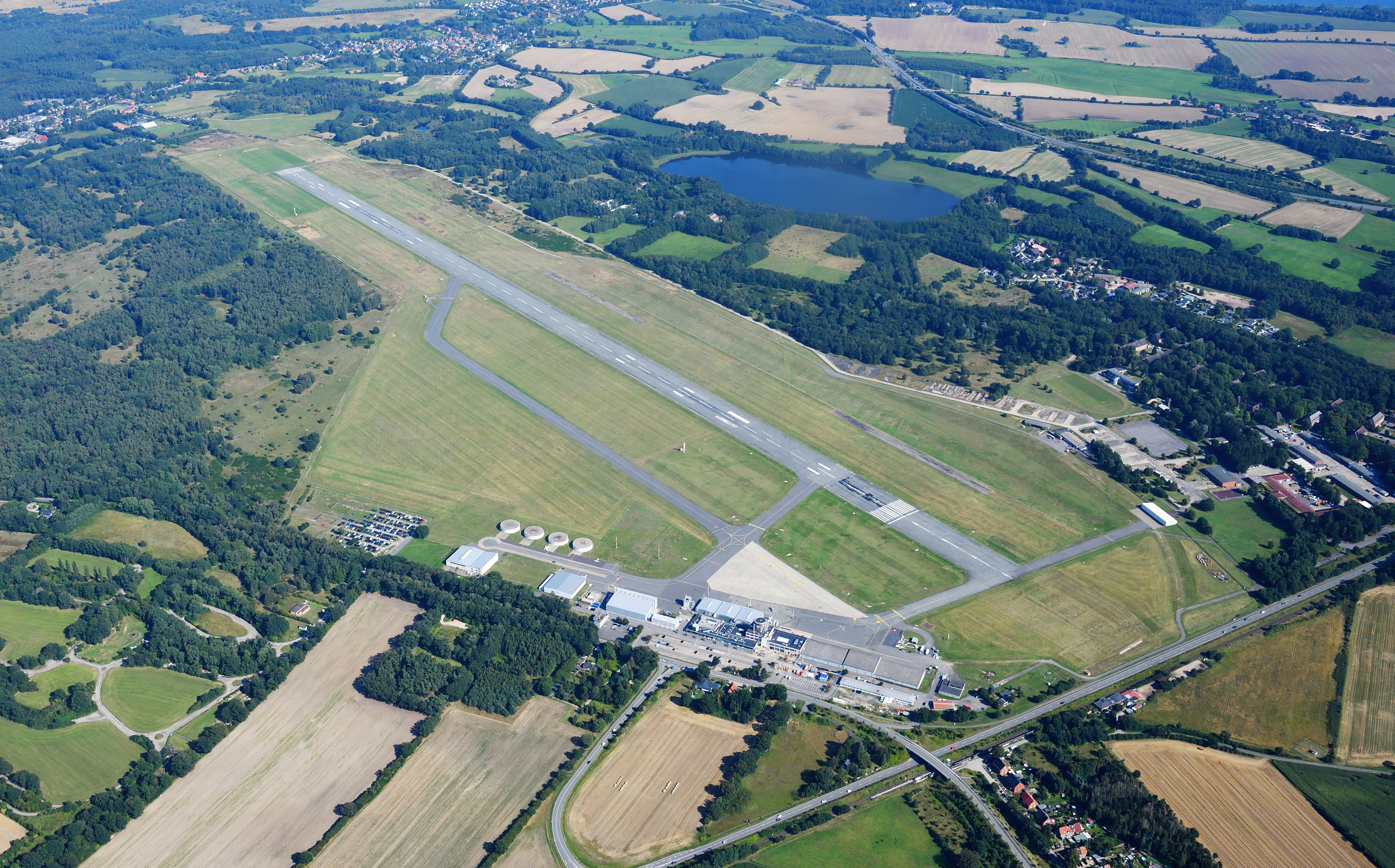
- IATA: LBC; ICAO: EDHL

Summary
- Airport type: Public
- Operator: Stöcker Flughafen GmbH & Co. KG
- Serves: Lübeck, Germany
- Hub for: Lübeck Air
- Elevation AMSL: 53 ft (16 m)
- Coordinates: 53°48′19″N 010°43′09″E
- Website: flughafen-luebeck.de

Map
- Location of Lübeck Airport

Runways
Direction	Length		Surface
Direction	m	ft	Surface
07/25	2,102	6,896	Asphalt

Statistics (2022)
- Passengers: 82,590 ▲+133,4%
- Aircraft movements: 23,089 ▲-11,4%
- Cargo (metric tons): 0 0,0%
- Sources: Statistics at ADV., AIP at German air traffic control.

Lübeck Airport (IATA: LBC, ICAO: EDHL) is a minor German airport located 8 km (5.0 mi) south of Lübeck, the second-largest city in the state of Schleswig-Holstein, and 54 km (34 mi) northeast of Hamburg. It is the secondary airport for the Hamburg Metropolitan Region, after the much bigger Hamburg Airport, and is used for a limited number of international and some occasional charter flights. The airport was therefore sometimes called "Hamburg Lübeck" for marketing purposes.

== History ==
=== Early years ===
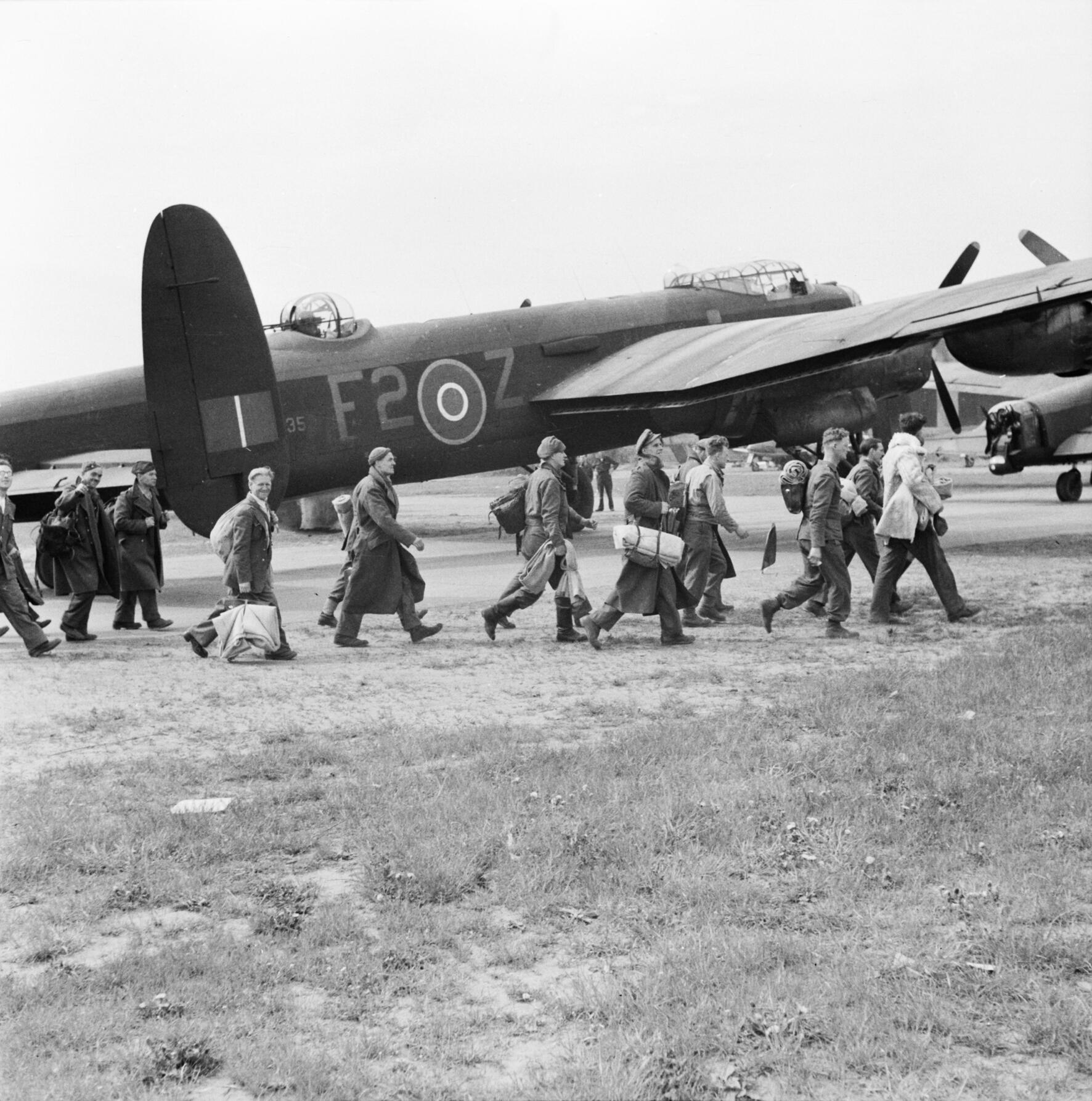
An Avro Lancaster during "Operation Exodus" with British ex-POWs at Lübeck Airport in 1945

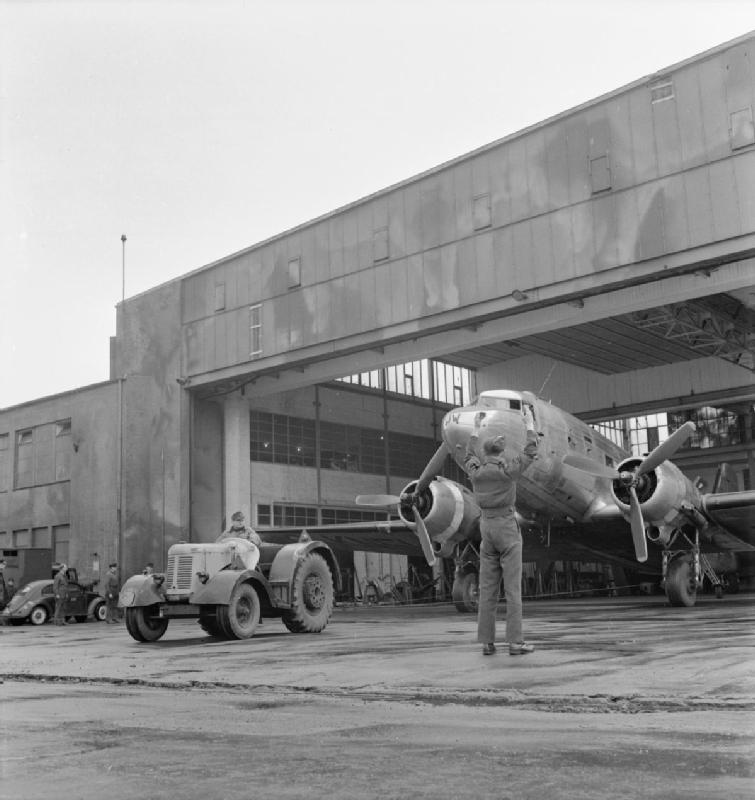
A Douglas DC-3 operating out of Lübeck Airport during the Berlin Airlift

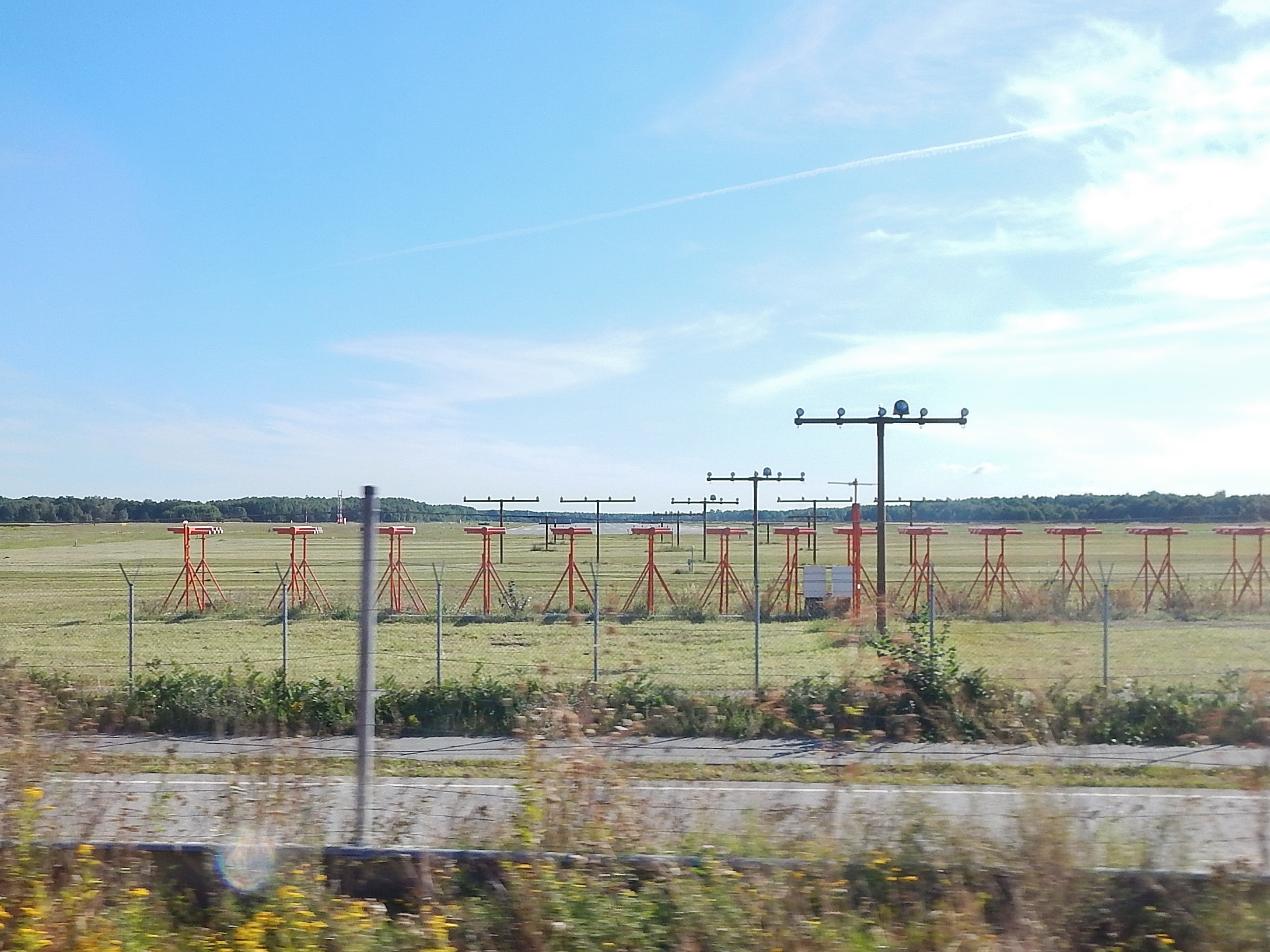
Runway view

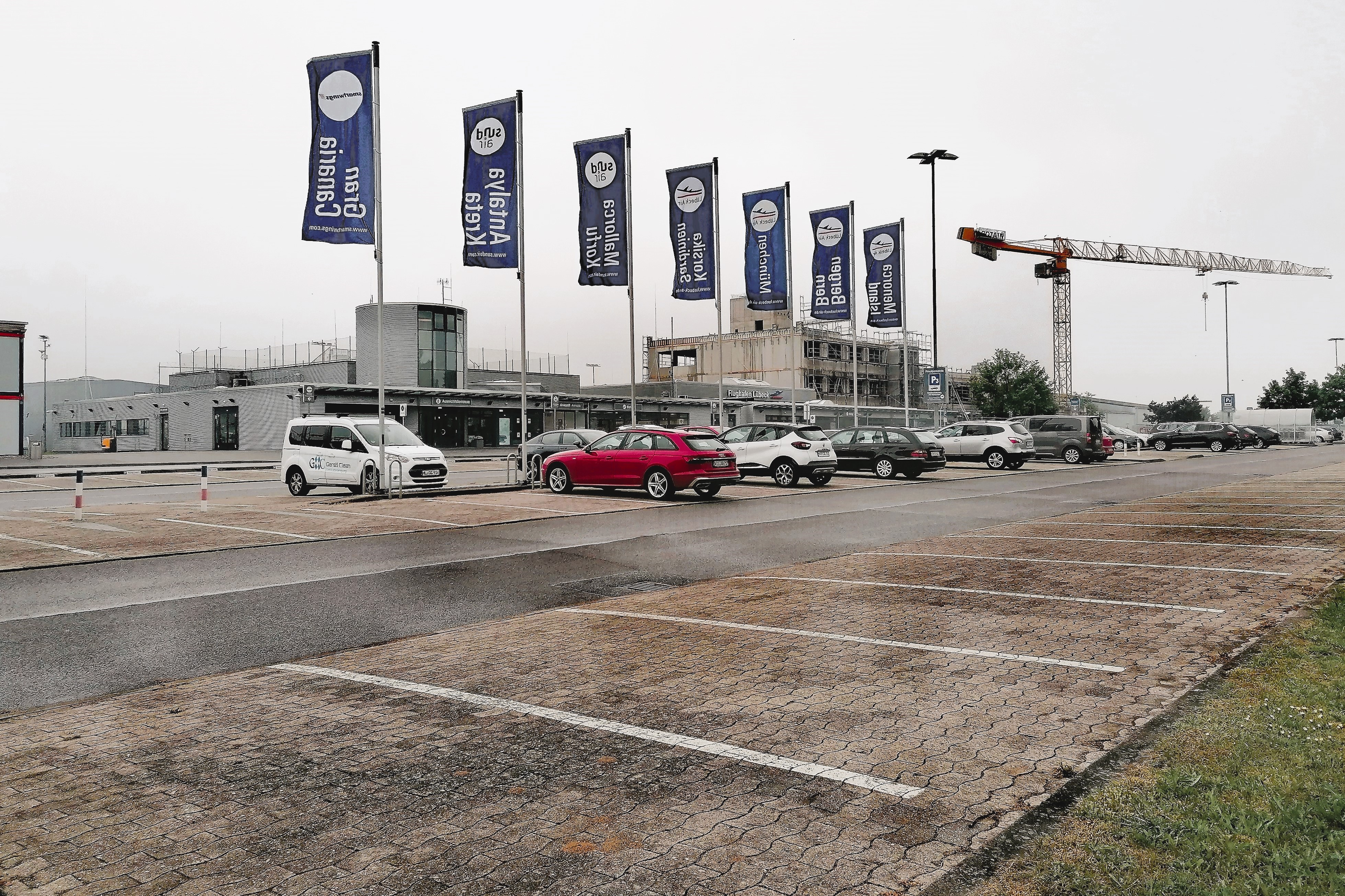
Terminal exterior

The construction of the airport began in 1916 and was completed in 1917 when it started its operations as a military airfield. At the end of World War I the airfield was shut down. In 1933 it was re-opened and extended by the Luftwaffe. During the Berlin Blockade after World War II, the Royal Air Force flew coal to Berlin and refugees to West Germany using Douglas Dakota aircraft.

Units:

- No. 1 Squadron RAF between 29 April and 26 June 1947 with the Gloster Meteor F.3
- No. 2 Squadron RAF between 22 November and 11 December 1947 with the Supermarine Spitfire PR 19
- No. 3 Squadron RAF initially between 5 January and 11 February 1948 with the Hawker Tempest V then between 9 August and 4 September 1948 with the de Havilland Vampire F.1
- No. 4 Squadron RAF between 1 May and 28 August 1948 with a small rotation to Wahn for two months, using the de Havilland Mosquito FB.6
- No. 10 Squadron RAF detachment during the Berlin Airlift with the Dakota
- No. 16 Squadron RAF between 3 and 24 November 1947 and then between 14 July and 7 August 1948 with the Tempest F.2
- No. 18 Squadron RAF detachment during the Berlin Airlift with the Dakota
- No. 19 Squadron RAF between 2 May and 29 June 1946 with the Spitfire LF 16E
- No. 23 Squadron RAF initially between 22 September and 4 October 1946 with the Mosquito NF.30 then between 29 August and 11 September 1947 and 11 March and 25 March 1948 with the Mosquito NF.36
- No. 25 Squadron RAF multiple times between 6 October 1945 and 30 April 1948 with the Mosquito VI & NF.36
- No. 26 (South African) Squadron RAF initially between 7 September 1945 and 1 April 1946 with the Spitfire XI then between 11 February and 5 July 1948 with the Tempest F.2
- No. 29 Squadron RAF at various times between 21 September 1945 and 14 May 1948 with the Mosquito XXX & NF.36
- No. 30 Squadron RAF detachment during the Berlin Airlift with the Dakota
- No. 33 Squadron RAF between 5 January and 11 February 1948 with the Tempest F.2
- No. 41 Squadron RAF initially between 6 September 1945 and 31 January 1946 with the Tempest V then between 29 June and 30 August 1946 with the Spitfire F.21
- No. 46 Squadron RAF detachment during the Berlin Airlift with the Dakota
- No. 53 Squadron RAF detachment during the Berlin Airlift with the Dakota
- No. 56 Squadron RAF between 3 May and 23 June 1948 with the Meteor F.3
- No. 62 Squadron RAF detachment during the Berlin Airlift with the Dakota
- No. 63 Squadron RAF initially between 3 September and 30 October 1946 with the Spitfire LF 16E then between 14 May and 29 June 1948 with the Meteor F.3
- No. 66 Squadron RAF initially between 2 September and 2 November 1946 with the Spitfire LF 16E then between 5 September 1947 and 29 April 1948 with the Meteor F.3
- No. 74 Squadron RAF between 1 July and 28 August 1947 with the Meteor F.3
- No. 77 Squadron RAF detachment during the Berlin Airlift with the Dakota
- No. 80 Squadron RAF between 2 and 29 April and 22 July and 24 August 1948 with the Spitfire F.24
- No. 85 Squadron RAF initially between 20 October and 3 November 1946 with the Mosquito XXX then between 19 October and 1 November 1946 with the Mosquito NF.36
- No. 91 (Nigeria) Squadron RAF between 29 June and 29 August 1946 with the Spitfire XXI
- No. 92 (East India) Squadron RAF between 31 August and 30 October 1947 and 10 March and 29 April 1948 with the Meteor F.3
- No. 107 Squadron RAF between 8 and 30 March and 5 and 31 July 1948 with the Mosquito VI
- No. 129 (Mysore) Squadron RAF between 2 May and 28 June 1946 with the Spitfire IXE
- No. 137 Squadron RAF between 11 July and 20 August 1945 with the Hawker Typhoon IB
- No. 141 Squadron RAF initially between 21 September and 5 October 1946 then 12 to 26 September 1947 and 2 to 16 April 1948 with the Mosquito NF.36
- No. 151 Squadron RAF between 3 January and 6 September 1946 with the Mosquito XXX
- No. 174 (Mauritius) Squadron RAF reformed here on 26 August 1945 with the Typhoon IB, before being disbanded on 7 September 1945
- No. 181 Squadron RAF between 7 May and 7 July 1945 with the Typhoon IB
- No. 182 Squadron RAF between 7 May and 11 July 1945 with the Typhoon IB
- No. 219 (Mysore) Squadron RAF between 17 November 1945 and 25 May 1946 with the Mosquito XXX
- No. 222 (Natal) Squadron RAF initially between 28 April and 26 June 1947 with the Meteor F.3 then between 1 May and 28 June 1948 with the Meteor F.4
- No. 245 (Northern Rhodesian) Squadron RAF between 29 October 1946 and 30 August 1947 with the Meteor F.3
- No. 247 (China-British) Squadron RAF between 6 May and 20 August 1945
- No. 257 (Burma) Squadron RAF between 31 June and 28 August 1947 with the Meteor F.3
- No. 263 (Fellowship of the Bellows) Squadron RAF reformed here on 30 August 1945 with the Meteor F.3
- No. 264 (Madras Presidency) Squadron RAF with three separate deployments between 12 August 1946 and 30 April 1948 with the Mosquito NF.36
- No. 266 (Rhodesia) Squadron RAF between 28 April and 26 June 1947 with the Meteor F.3
- No. 307 (Lwow) Squadron RAF between 4 and 15 November 1945 and between 9 and 24 February 1946 with the Mosquito XXX
- No. 486 Squadron RNZAF between 6 July and 7 September 1945 with the Tempest V
- No. 504 (County of Nottingham) Squadron RAuxAF detachment during 1945 with the Meteor F.3
- No. 616 (South Yorkshire) Squadron RAuxAF between 7 May and 30 August 1945 with the Meteor F.3
- No. 659 Squadron RAF between 5 and 10 May 1945 with the Taylorcraft Auster AOP.5
- Armament Practice Station, Lubeck was here between 1 May 1946 and 30 September 1948
- No. 1302 Mobile Wing RAF Regiment
- No. 1304 Mobile Wing RAF Regiment
- No. 1 Armoured Car Squadron RAF Regiment
- No. 20 L.A.A. Squadron RAF Regiment
- No. 51 (Rifle) Squadron RAF Regiment
- No. 61 (Rifle) Squadron RAF Regiment
- No. 2710 Squadron RAF Regiment
- No. 2726 Squadron RAF Regiment
- No. 2734 Field Squadron RAF Regiment
- No. 2781 Field Squadron RAF Regiment
- No. 2806 (Armoured) Squadron RAF Regiment
- No. 2819 (Anti-Aircraft) Squadron RAF Regiment
- No. 2829 Squadron RAF Regiment

=== Development into a low-cost airport ===
After the re-unification of Germany, the airport started to grow slightly when several airlines started flying to Lübeck. In 1997, the arrival terminal was re-constructed and extended.

Ryanair started to operate from the airport in 2000 with the first flights to London-Stansted. Ryanair's route system expanded over the years until 2009. Wizz Air started operations in 2006 with flights to Gdańsk, and later other eastern European destinations. Discussions about Ryanair opening a base at the airport were held since 2009 without results.

Infratil, an infrastructure investment company from New Zealand held a 90% shareholding from November 2005 until the end of October 2009, when it sold its shares back to the City of Lübeck. The new principal operator, Flughafen Lübeck GmbH, had been searching for an investor since then, when in 2013 the airport was sold to a private investor.

In 2010, both the financial crisis and the eruption of the Eyjafjallajökull in Iceland led to a general decrease in passenger numbers and destinations.

A new ILS CAT II system went operational in February 2014, allowing planes to operate at the airport in more difficult weather conditions. As of March 2014, there were four lawsuits active against a further expansion of the airport.

=== Bankruptcy ===
On 23 April 2014 Lübeck Airport filed for bankruptcy. A few days earlier it had been reported that the owner, which bought the airport in 2013, had pulled out again. The airport continued to operate while the liquidator reviewed possible strategies. In July 2014, the bankrupt airport was sold to Chinese investor PuRen Germany GmbH, a subsidiary of PuRen Group.

In June 2014 Ryanair announced it would leave Lübeck Airport as of October 2014 due to the airport's uncertain future. Soon this date was revised to July 2014, when the year-round route to Bergamo as well as the seasonal services to Palma de Mallorca and Pisa ceased. Meanwhile, Ryanair announced it would start new routes from Hamburg Airport instead.

In September 2015, the airport's new owner, the German subsidiary of the Chinese PuRen Group, also declared bankruptcy. The state of Schleswig-Holstein had already announced it would not invest in the airport. New investors were sought and operations would be maintained until further notice. As of January 2016, the selection process for a new owner of the airport was still ongoing.

In March 2016, Wizz Air announced that it would cease all operations to and from Lübeck by 15 April 2016, leaving the airport without any scheduled passenger services. The routes to Gdańsk, Kyiv–Zhulyany and Skopje were relocated to Hamburg Airport, while the flights to Riga as well as the newly established route to Sofia ceased without replacement. The last scheduled commercial flight, a Wizz Air service to Sofia, left Lübeck at 20:05 local time on 15 April 2016.

=== Resumption of operations ===
In January 2020, Lübeck Airport announced plans to start a virtual airline, with scheduled flights to Stuttgart and Munich from 1 June 2020. For this purpose, an ATR 72-500 was purchased, to be flown under the Lübeck Air brand and was then operated by Air Alsie. Flights eventually began on 17 August 2020, due to the COVID-19 pandemic.

In March 2023, Lübeck Air announced it would end its ATR flights and seek to start jet operations with another airline. They also published a revised route network focusing on more leisure destinations, ending the route to Stuttgart Airport. In September 2023, Lübeck Air announced the suspension of all flights for the upcoming winter season, leaving Lübeck Airport without scheduled operations. Later, Lübeck Air then confirmed it would not resume its own operations for the foreseeable future, depending on cooperation with other airlines from Lübeck Airport for 2024 instead.

In 2024, Ryanair announced it would return to Lübeck after a ten-year hiatus, inaugurating scheduled flights to London, Málaga and Palma de Mallorca in 2025.

== Facilities ==
Lübeck Airport features one small terminal building, containing check-in facilities, a shop and some restaurants. The apron features three stands for walk-boarding, which are suitable for mid-sized aircraft such as the Airbus A320, as well as some stands for smaller general aviation aircraft.

== Airlines and destinations ==
The following airlines operate regular scheduled flights at Lübeck Airport:

Airlines	Destinations
Corendon Airlines	Seasonal: Antalya
Ryanair	London–Stansted, Málaga, Palma de Mallorca

== Statistics ==
	Passengers
2000	184,622
2001	▲231,094
2002	▲270,188
2003	▲539,580
2004	▲598,777
2005	▲715,731
2006	▼677,638
2007	▼612,858
2008	▼534,509
2009	▲688,302
2010	▼537,835
2011	▼344,068
2012	▲359,974
2013	▲367,252
2014	▼168,593
Source: ADV, Lübeck Airport

== Ground transportation ==
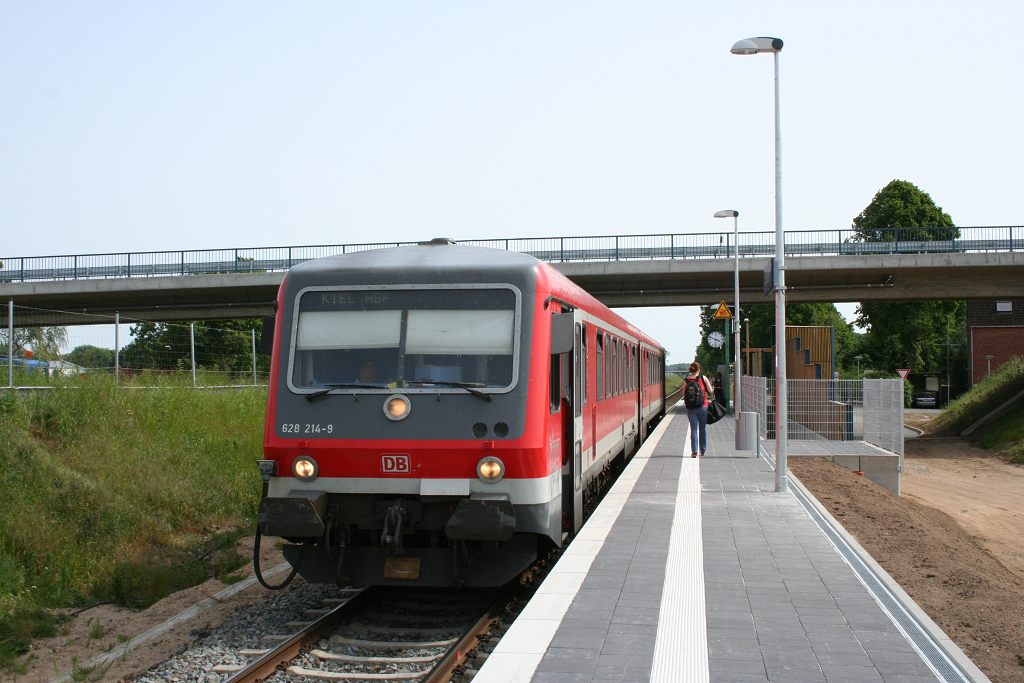
Lübeck Airport station with a local train towards Kiel

Lübeck Airport can be reached via motorways A1 which leads towards Hamburg and A20 which runs to the east through Mecklenburg-Vorpommern (exit Lübeck-Süd).

The local bus line 6 runs every 30 minutes and connects the airport with Lübeck's main bus station ("ZOB").

Regional trains run every hour between Kiel and Lüneburg, stopping at the airport's own station Lübeck-Flughafen on the single-track non-electrified Lübeck–Lüneburg railway. Those trains also serve Lübeck main station. Connecting trains are available at Lübeck Hauptbahnhof or in Büchen to Hamburg and other destinations.

== See also ==
- Transport in Germany
- List of airports in Germany
