= Green Airlines =

German airline

- Founded: 2020
- Ceased operations: April 5, 2022
- Operating bases: Karlsruhe/Baden-Baden Airport
- Fleet size: 2
- Destinations: 6
- Headquarters: Karlsruhe, Germany
- Website: green-airlines.com

Green Airlines was a German virtual airline company based at Karlsruhe/Baden-Baden Airport.

== History ==
The company was established in October 2020. The virtual airline's flights were originally planned to be operated by Danish Alsie Express and by Air New Paific while later French Chalair Aviation stepped in.

Green Airlines then announced contracts with Bulgarian ALK Airlines and Romanian Just Us Air to operate their seasonal leisure services from Rostock and Paderborn. In June 2021, Green Airlines also announced the launch of five leisure destinations from Groningen Airport in the Netherlands. They also started to serve Zurich Airport. However, in July 2021, Green Airlines announced the suspension of all international flights including leisure charters, citing the COVID-19 pandemic. The virtual airline then also planned to acquire its own operations license.

In August 2021, a dispute between Green Airlines and another current wetlease contractor, German Airways, has been reported resulting in the termination of their agreement. A few weeks prior, ALK Airlines also pulled out of their mutual affiliation bringing back Chalair Aviation to operate the currently remaining German domestic flights. Shortly after, German Airways sued Green Airlines for up to 11 million € for alleged breach of contract. Also in August 2021, Green Airlines has been accused of greenwashing after indiscrepancies arose regarding their supposedly supported ecological projects and organizations.

In October 2021, Green Airlines announced it would start domestic operations from Weeze Airport and Karlsruhe/Baden-Baden Airport in 2022. However, in November 2021, Green Airlines announced it would pause all flight activities until February 2022. The new routes were then rescheduled to late March 2022 or in the case of the Karlsruhe/Baden-Baden services without a new date announcement. This sparked controversy as both Berlin and Munich airports confirmed that neither Green Airlines nor another operating carrier of their behalf requested the necessary slots for the routes as of late January.

After cancelling several scheduled inaugural flights for their expanded network, Green Airlines commenced one of its new services in April 2022 with a Cessna Caravan instead of the planned ATR 72 due to lower than expected passenger numbers.

On 6 April 2022, Green Airlines announced the termination of all scheduled and charter operations with immediate effect stating an unviable business case for the time being.

In May 2022, German environmental protection NGO Deutsche Umwelthilfe announced it would sue Green Airlines over claims the company misled passengers over its CO_{2}-compensation efforts.

== Destinations ==
As of April 2022, prior to the suspension of all services, Green Airlines served the following - partially seasonal - destinations:

Germany

- Berlin - Berlin Brandenburg Airport
- Munich - Munich Airport
- Paderborn - Paderborn Lippstadt Airport
- Sylt - Sylt Airport
- Usedom - Usedom Airport
- Weeze - Weeze Airport

== Fleet ==
As of August 2021, Green Airlines' flights are operated by the following contracted aircraft:

- ATR 42
- ATR 72
