= Bornholm Airport =

Bornholm Airport Bornholms Lufthavn
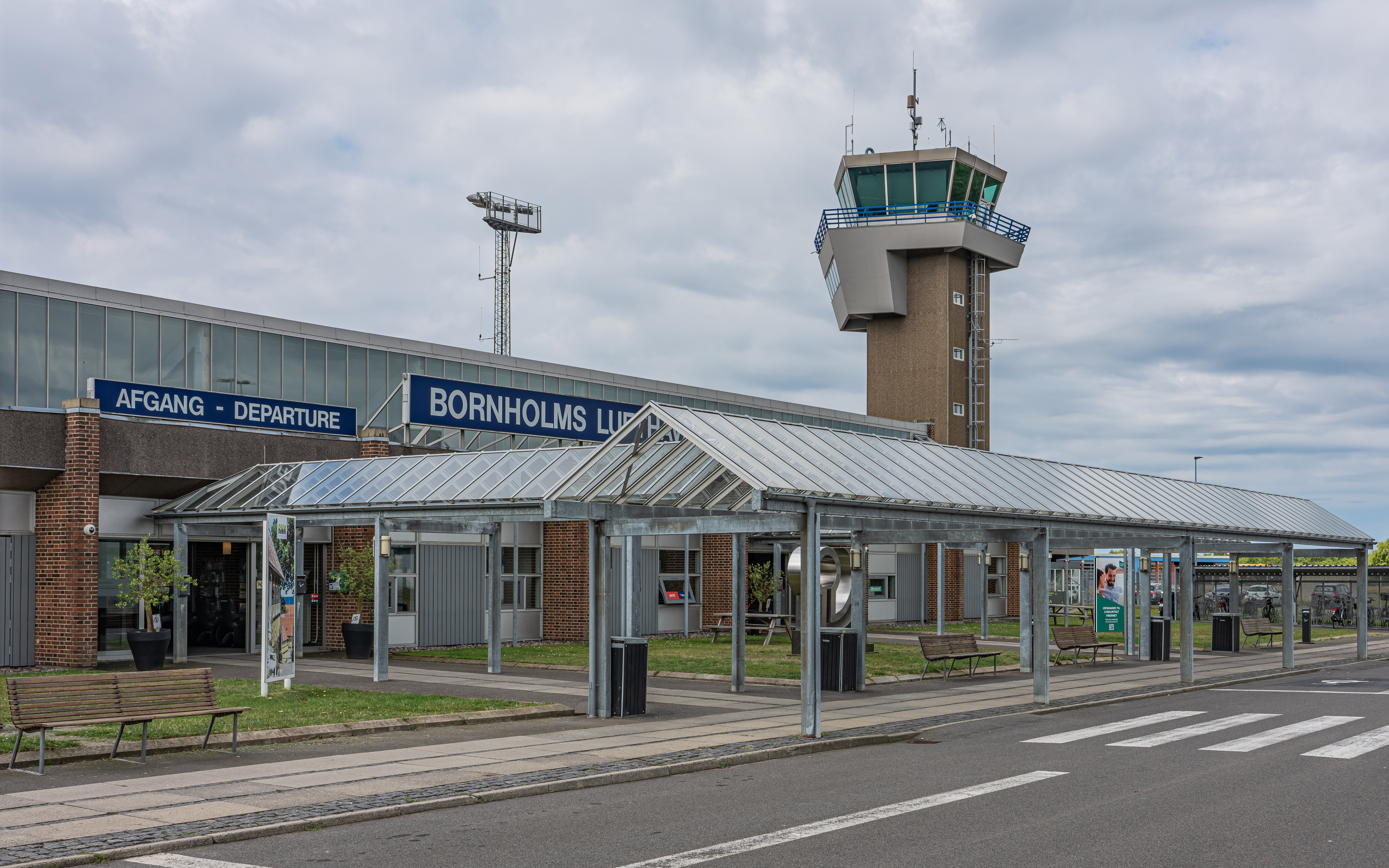
- IATA: RNN; ICAO: EKRN

Summary
- Airport type: Public
- Operator: Danish Civil Aviation Administration (Statens Luftfartsvæsen)
- Location: Bornholm
- Elevation AMSL: 52 ft (16 m)
- Coordinates: 55°03′48″N 014°45′34″E

Map
- Location of airport in Denmark

Runways
Direction	Length		Surface
Direction	ft	m	Surface
11/29	6,568	2,002	Asphalt

Statistics (2019)
- Passengers: 236,428

Bornholm Airport (Danish: Bornholms Lufthavn) (IATA: RNN, ICAO: EKRN) is a Danish airport located 2.7 nautical miles (5 km) southeast of Rønne, on the island of Bornholm. The airport is operated by Statens Luftfartsvæsen (The Danish Civil Aviation Administration) with the air traffic control provided by Naviair.

== History ==
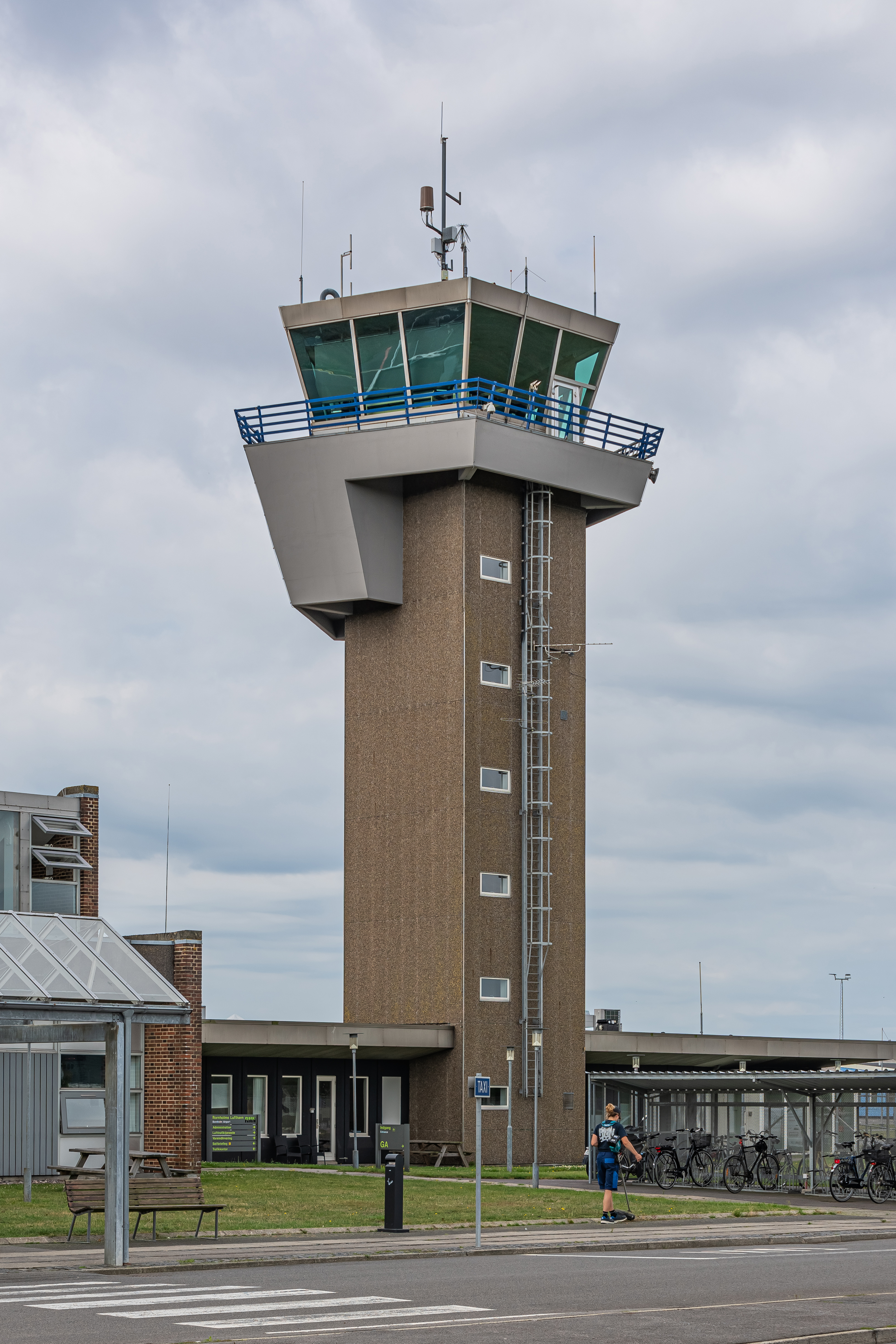
Control tower

In 1935, representatives of Rigsdagen, Rønne municipality and Det Danske Luftfartsselskab (DDL) − later a part of Scandinavian Airlines System − agreed to establish an air connection between Rønne and Copenhagen. The following year A/S Den bornholmske Flyveplads was founded, with airport construction beginning in 1937. Two years later the first route commenced on a temporary licence from the air transport inspectorate. Flights were however suspended after several days due to runway problems. The airport was officially opened on 16 November 1940, with DDL operating a daily route to Copenhagen. The first temporary terminal was erected shortly after, in 1941, however it wasn't until 1961 that the proper terminal building was built. In 1947 the Danish state took control over the airport, changing its name to Rønne Airport. The name of the airport was changed again in 1992, this time to Bornholm Airport in order to facilitate its marketing as a holiday destination.

In 1982, the operations were taken over by Maersk Air, later a part of Sterling Airlines. Heavy losses of the former forced it to abandon the route in 2002, which was then taken over by Cimber Air. In 2005 Danish Air Transport became the second carrier at Bornholm Airport, increasing competition on the route. The airline decided to abandon the Copenhagen–Bornholm route in 2008, but took it up again after the bankruptcy of Cimber Sterling in 2012.

== Airlines and destinations ==
The following airlines operate regular scheduled and charter flights at the airport:

Airlines	Destinations
Alsie Express	Seasonal: Sønderborg
DAT	Copenhagen; Seasonal: Aalborg, Aarhus, Billund
Norwegian Air Shuttle	Seasonal: Copenhagen
Scandinavian Airlines	Seasonal: Copenhagen
Sunclass Airlines	Seasonal charter: Chania, Gran Canaria, Kos, Palma de Mallorca, Rhodes, Skiathos

== See also ==
- List of the largest airports in the Nordic countries
