= Københavns Lufthavne =

Operator of airports in Copenhagen

Københavns Lufthavne A/S
- Company type: Public (Nasdaq Copenhagen: KBHL)
- ISIN: DK0010201102
- Industry: Airport operation
- Founded: 1925; 101 years ago
- Headquarters: Kastrup, Denmark
- Key people: Thomas Woldbye (CEO)
- Revenue: DKK 2,738 million (2005)
- Website: www.cph.dk

Københavns Lufthavne is a public limited company that operates two airports in Copenhagen, Denmark: Copenhagen Airport and Roskilde Airport. In addition, it previously held a 49% stake in Newcastle International Airport and 10% of Aeropuertos del Sureste that operated nine airports in Mexico.

The largest owners of Københavns Lufthavne were Macquarie Infrastructure Corporation (52.4%) and the Government of Denmark (39.2%). Founded by the government in 1925 to operate the airport, the firm was a government enterprise called Københavns Lufthavnsvæsen until 1990, when it was transformed into a limited company.

After the Danish government sold 25% of its stake in the company in 1994, Københavns Lufthavne was listed on the Copenhagen Stock Exchange. In 1996 and 2000 the government sold additional 24% and 17%, respectively.

In 2025, the Ministry of Finance acquired pension fund ATP's 59% stake, giving it a 98% shareholding.
