= Alsie Express =

Danish airline

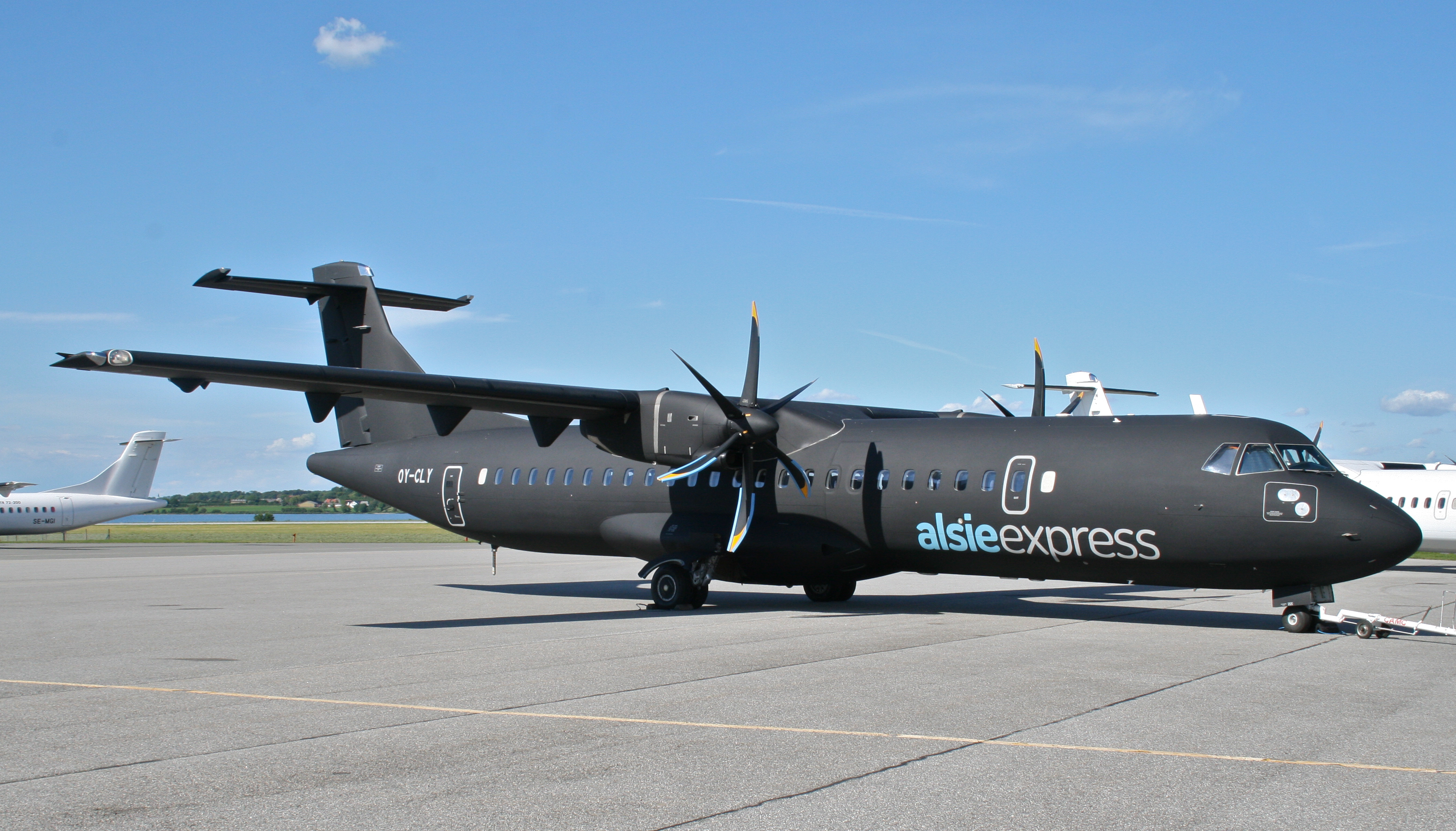
- ATR 72-500
IATA	ICAO	Call sign
6I	MMD	MERMAID
- Founded: 2013; 13 years ago
- Operating bases: Sønderborg Airport
- Fleet size: 2
- Destinations: 5
- Parent company: Air Alsie
- Headquarters: Sønderborg, Denmark
- Website: www.alsieexpress.com

Alsie Express is a Danish virtual airline based at Sønderborg. All flights are operated by its sister carrier, Air Alsie, as it is not an AOC holder.

== History ==
Alsie Express was founded on May 22, 2013, and started operations on the route between Sønderborg and Copenhagen on the following June 17. The previous operator, Danish Air Transport, cancelled all fights between Sønderborg – Copenhagen a week after Alsie Express started flying the route.

In January 2021, Alsie Express announced the suspension of its scheduled services until late March 2021 in the wake of the COVID-19 pandemic.

== Destinations ==
As of January 2021, Alsie Express serves the following destinations:

Country	City	Airport	Notes
Croatia	Dubrovnik	Dubrovnik Airport	Seasonal charter
Croatia	Zadar	Zadar Airport	Seasonal charter
Denmark	Bornholm	Bornholm Airport	Seasonal charter
Denmark	Copenhagen	Copenhagen Airport	
Denmark	Sønderborg	Sønderborg Airport	Base
Guernsey	Saint Peter Port	Guernsey Airport	Seasonal charter
Isle of Man	Douglas	Isle of Man Airport	Seasonal charter
Jersey	St Helier	Jersey Airport	Seasonal charter
Sweden	Sälen	Scandinavian Mountains Airport	Seasonal

== Fleet ==
As of January 2021, the Alsie Express fleet consists of the following aircraft:

Aircraft	In service	Passengers	Notes
ATR 72-500	2	48; 64	

== See also ==
- Green Airlines
