= Copenhagen Airport =

International airport serving Copenhagen, Denmark

Copenhagen Airport Københavns Lufthavn

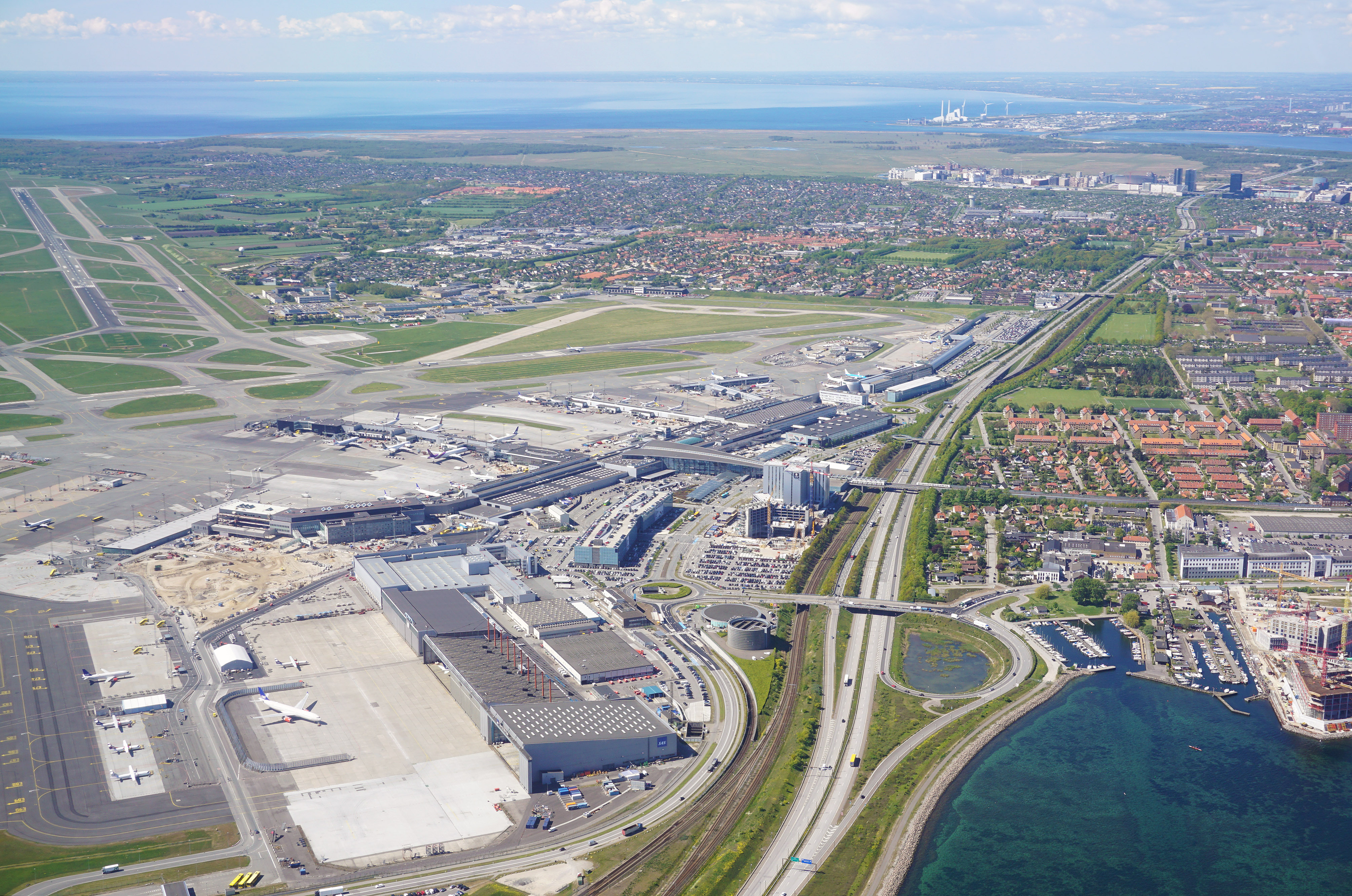
- IATA: CPH; ICAO: EKCH; WMO: 06180

Summary
- Airport type: Public
- Owner/Operator: Københavns Lufthavne
- Serves: Copenhagen metropolitan area (Denmark); Metropolitan Malmö (Sweden)
- Location: Kastrup, Tårnby, Copenhagen, Denmark
- Opened: 20 April 1925; 101 years ago
- Hub for: DAT; Scandinavian Airlines
- Focus city for: Air Greenland; Finnair
- Operating base for: Jettime; Norwegian Air Shuttle; Ryanair; Sunclass Airlines
- Elevation AMSL: 5 m (16 ft)
- Coordinates: 55°37′05″N 012°39′22″E
- Website: www.cph.dk

Maps
- Airport diagram

- Location within Denmark CPH/EKCH (Capital Region)

Runways
| Direction | Length | | Surface |
| Direction | m | ft | Surface |
|---|---|---|---|
| 04L/22R | 3,600 | 11,810 | Asphalt |
| 04R/22L | 3,300 | 10,827 | Asphalt |
| 12/30 | 2,800 | 9,186 | Asphalt/concrete |

Statistics (2025)
- Passengers: ▲32,433,694
- Domestic: ▲1,329,005
- International: ▲31,104,689
- Aircraft movements: ▲256,737
- Source: cph.dk

Copenhagen Airport (Danish: Københavns Lufthavn [kʰøpm̩ˈhɑwns ˈlɔftˌhɑwˀn]) (IATA: CPH, ICAO: EKCH) is an international airport serving Copenhagen, the capital of Denmark, as well as the wider Øresund Region, including Zealand, Malmö, and the southern Swedish province of Scania as a whole. It is the largest airport in the Nordic countries.

As the Nordic countries' largest airport, it served close to 30 million passengers in 2024. It is one of the oldest international airports in Europe, the fourth-busiest in Northern Europe, and the busiest for international travel in Scandinavia.

The airport is on the island of Amager, 8 kilometres (5 miles) south of Copenhagen city centre, and 24 km (15 mi) west of Malmö city centre, to which it is connected by the Øresund Bridge. The airport covers an area of 11.8 km^{2} (4.6 sq mi). Most of the airport is in the municipality of Tårnby, with a small part in the city of Dragør.

The airport is the main hub out of three used by Scandinavian Airlines and is also an operating base for Sunclass Airlines and Norwegian Air Shuttle. Copenhagen Airport handles around 60 scheduled airlines, and has a maximum operation capability of 83 operations/hour, and a total of 108 jet bridges and remote parking stands. Most of the airport's passengers are international. In 2015, 6.1% of passengers travelled to and from other Danish airports, 83.5% to/from other European airports, and 10.4% were intercontinental passengers. The airport is owned by Københavns Lufthavne, which also operates Roskilde Airport. 2,800 employees work directly for Københavns Lufthavne, while a total of 18,000 people are employed in all jobs at the airport.

Copenhagen Airport was originally called Kastrup Airport, after the small town of Kastrup, now part of the Tårnby municipality. The formal name is still Copenhagen Airport, Kastrup, to distinguish it from Roskilde Airport.

== History ==
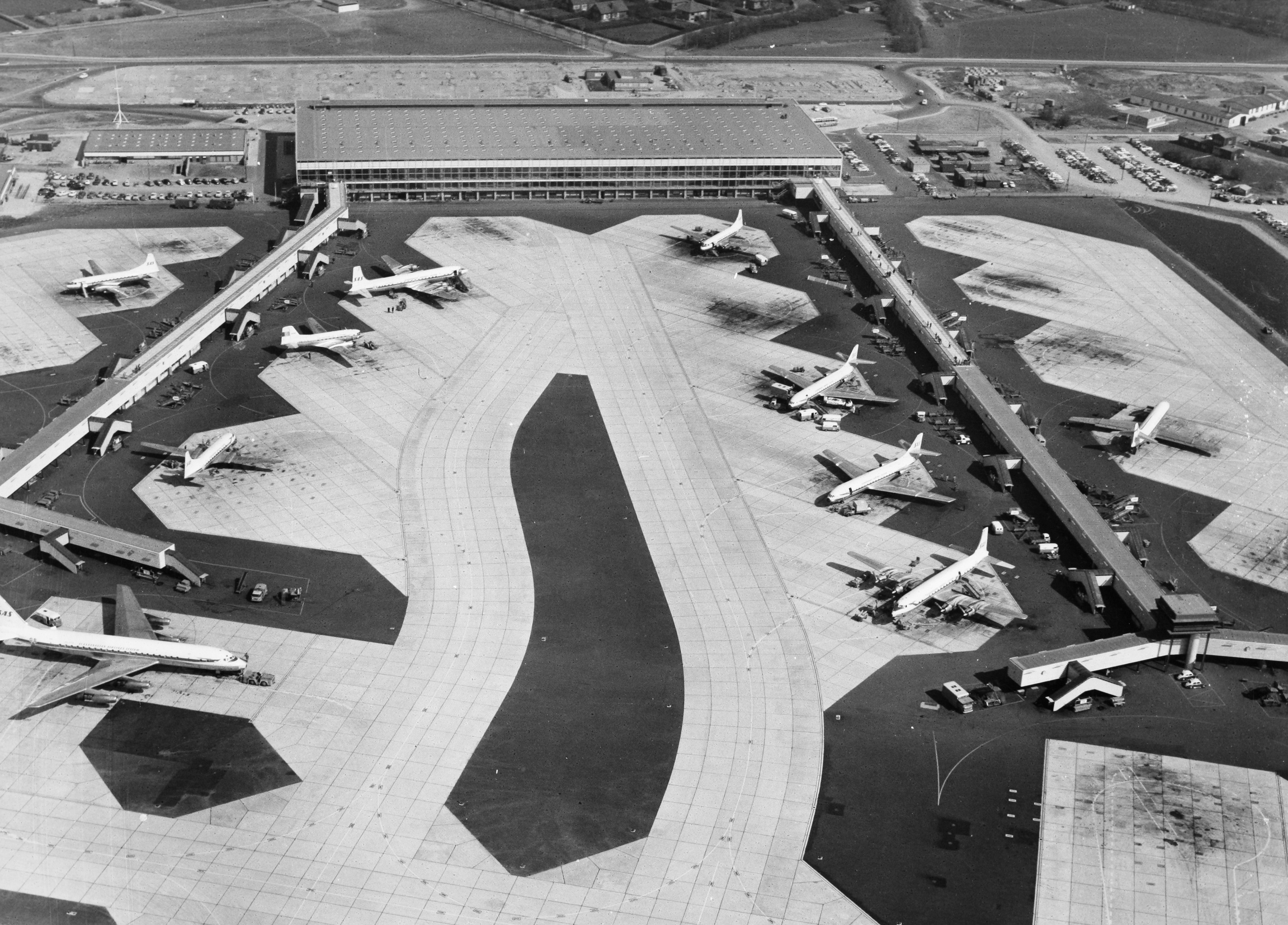
Kastrup Airport in the 1960s

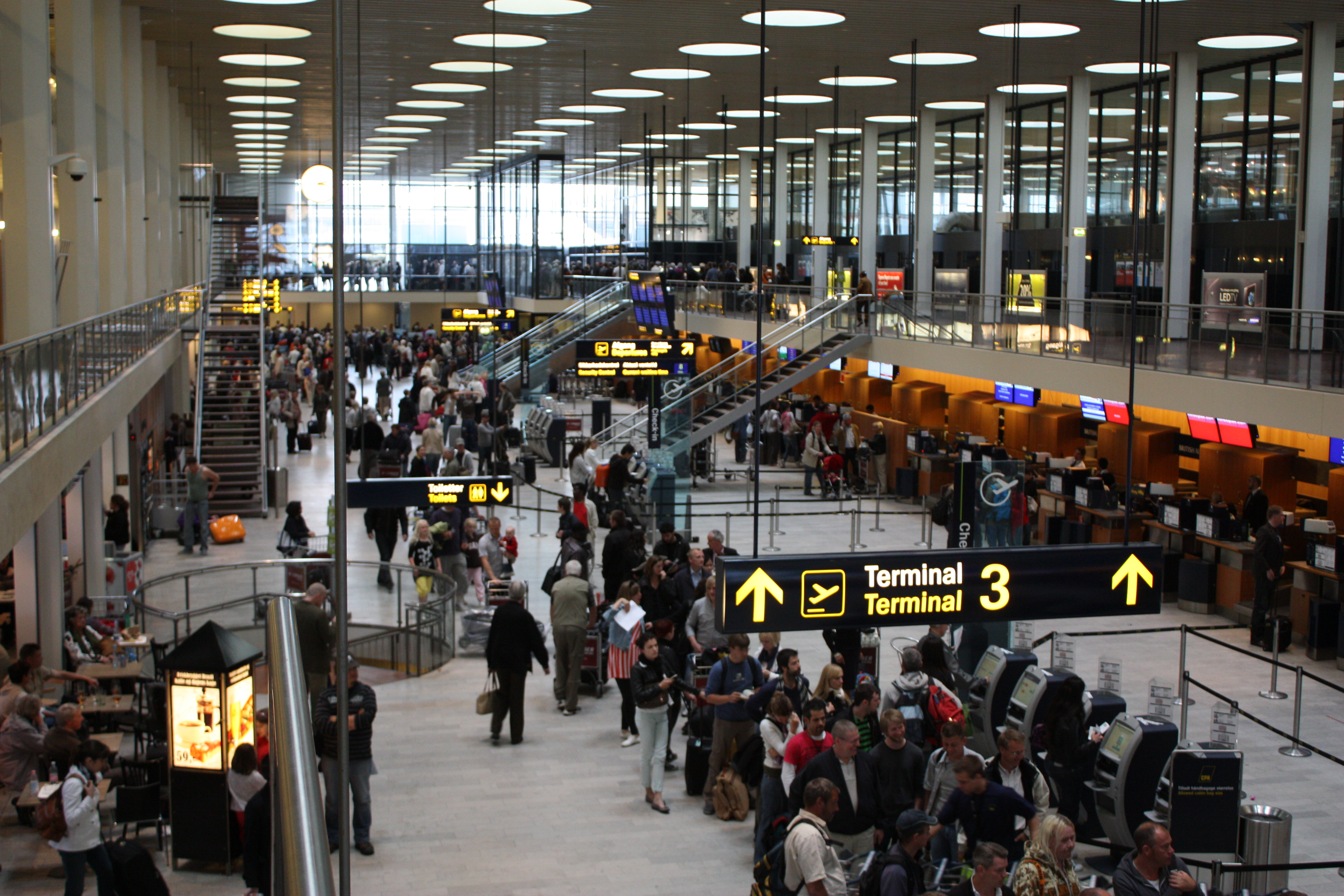
Check-in desks at Terminal 2

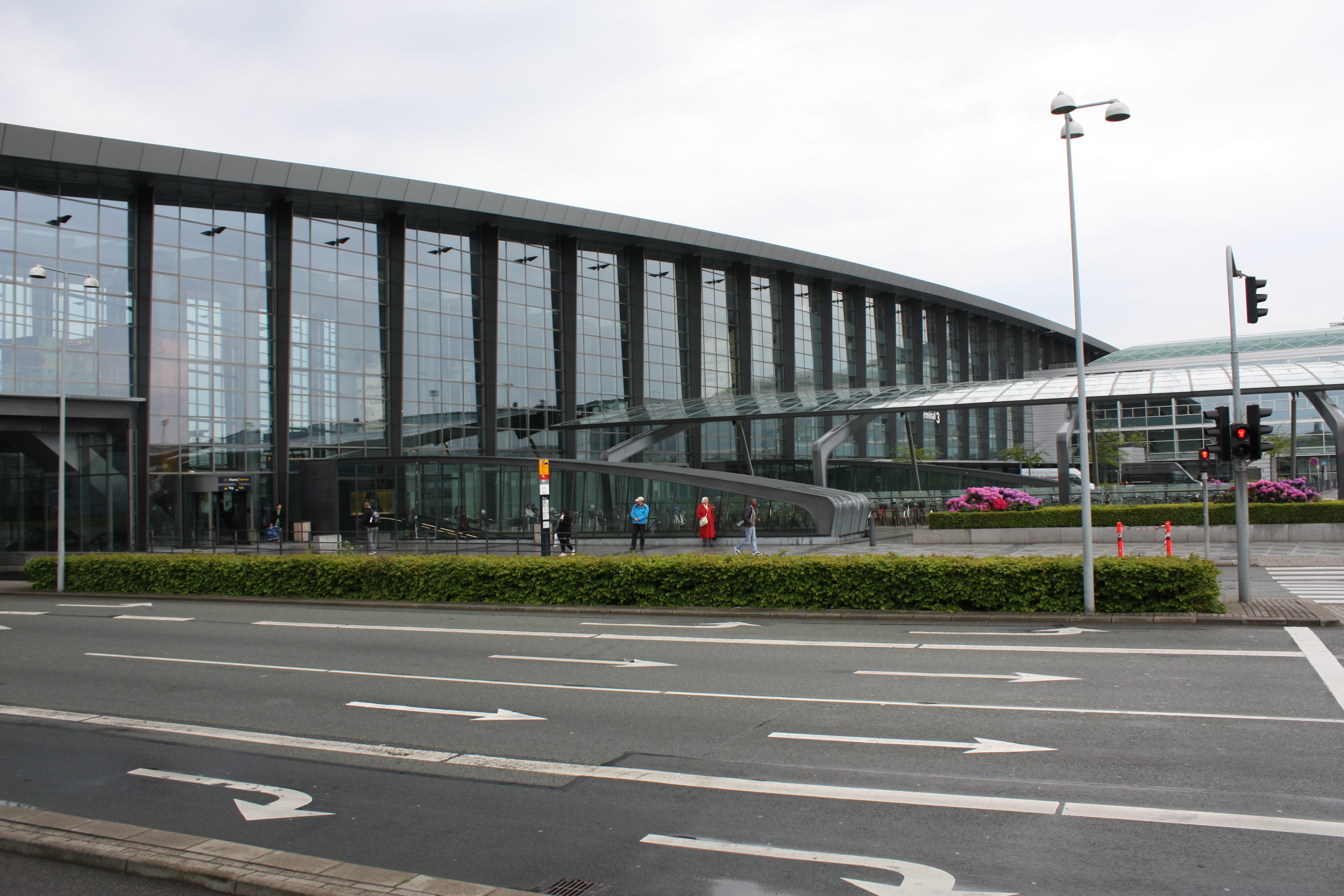
Exterior of Terminal 3

The airport was inaugurated on 20 April 1925 and was one of the first civil airports in the world. It consisted of a large, impressive terminal built of wood, a couple of hangars, a balloon mast, a hydroplane landing stage and a few grassy meadows that could be used as runways. The grass on the runways was kept short by sheep, which were shepherded away before take-offs and landings. From 1932 to 1939, takeoffs and landings increased from 6,000 to 50,000 and passenger number increased to 72,000. Between 1936 and 1939, a new terminal was built, considered one of the finest examples of Nordic functionalism. The terminal was designed by Vilhelm Lauritzen, who was considered a pioneer among architects, in terms not only of architecture and construction, but also of service and passenger comfort.

In the years of World War II, the Copenhagen airport was closed for civil operations except for periodic flights to destinations in Sweden and Nazi Germany (including German-occupied Austria). In the summer of 1941 the first hard-surface runway opened. It was 1,400 metres (4,600 ft) long and 65 m (213 ft) wide. When World War II ended in May 1945, Copenhagen had the most modern international airport in Europe, because the airport remained untouched by actual acts of war.

On 1 August 1947, Scandinavian Airlines (SAS) was founded, an important event for the Copenhagen Airport, as Copenhagen was to be the main hub for the airline. Traffic increased rapidly in the first years SAS operated. In 1948, Copenhagen airport was third largest airport in Europe with 150 daily takeoffs and almost 300,000 passengers for the year. The airport continued its rapid growth. The terminal was expanded several times and new hangars were erected.

By 10 May 1960, when the new airport terminal (now Terminal 2) was inaugurated, the daily number of jet operations had increased to 28, and still traffic kept on growing. The large new airport terminal soon became too small, and in 1969 yet another huge expansion programme was launched. Domestic traffic was relocated to a new domestic terminal (the eastern part of Terminal 1). The (current) international terminal was supplemented with a new pier (C) and a separate arrivals hall (the building between Terminals 2 and 3). A new control tower and 3,600 metres (11,800 ft) of additional runways allowed take-offs and landings to take place at the same time. When the comprehensive expansion was completed in 1972, the number of take-offs and landings exceeded 180,000 and there were more than eight million passengers.

The expansion of the airport began in 1982, after the necessary period of planning. The intention was not to build Europe's largest airport, but to build transit passengers' favourite airport. A stay at the airport was supposed to be an integral part of the travel experience. Efficiency and precision were obvious demands, but focus was also on generating an oasis where international travellers could relax: beautiful architecture, Scandinavian design, and pleasant, light, and comfortable surroundings with plenty of shops, restaurants, and other facilities providing enjoyment and pleasure. The new cargo terminal was built in the eastern area of the airport.

From 1984, SAS operated a marine link from the airport to Malmö, across the Øresund to a dedicated terminal in Malmö where luggage could be checked in. From 1984 to 1994, the service was operated by hovercraft, whereas from 1994 to 2000 catamarans were used. The marine link closed in 2000 due to the opening of the Øresund Bridge.

A number of important construction projects were completed in 1998: a pier connecting the domestic and international terminals; a new arrivals hall; new modern baggage handling facilities; an underground railway station with two large underground parking facilities with 2400 spaces opens; and above it all the spacious and impressive delta-shaped terminal (Terminal 3) with 17 million passengers capacity. The first stage of the new Pier D was completed in the spring of 1999.

On 1 July 2000 the Øresund Bridge opened which connects Denmark and Sweden by motorway and train. In 2001 the five-star Hilton hotel opened with 382 rooms. In 2006 for the first time in its history Copenhagen airport exceeded 20 million passengers and reached 20,900,000 passengers. In October 2007 the metro station opened, connecting the airport to the Copenhagen Metro. A new control tower opened in 2008 by Naviair as part of a major renovation of the ATC system. Airport officials announced plans to build a new low-cost terminal at the facility. On 31 October 2010 the new low cost terminal CPH Go opened by easyJet. In 2013 the airport handled a new record of 24,067,030 passengers. In 2014 CPH announced plans to increase capacity to 40 million passengers per year. It reached 30 million in 2018.

From late 2015, the airport became the first in Scandinavia to have a regularly scheduled A380 service after Emirates started operating the plane for its Copenhagen route.

Due to the COVID-19 pandemic the number of passengers fell dramatically during 2020. There were 7.525 million passengers this year, a majority of these in January and February when restrictions were yet not issued. The Group Annual Report 2020 showed 600 million DKK in deficit.

== Facilities ==
=== Terminals ===
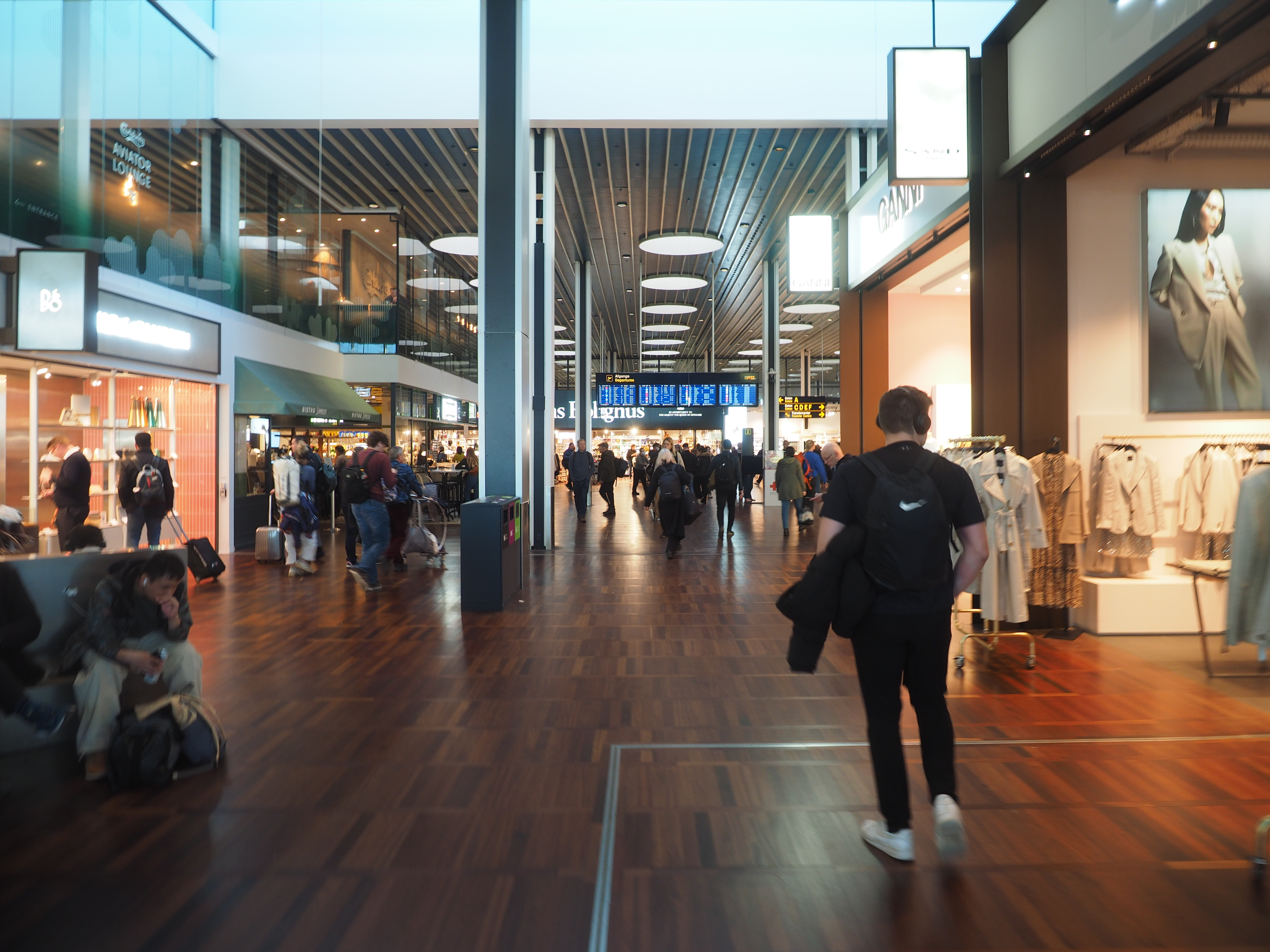
Copenhagen Airport in 2025

Copenhagen Airport has two terminals for check-in, Terminals 2 and 3, which handle all flights and share a common airside passenger concourse as well as the arrivals section which houses customs and baggage claim and is physically located in Terminal 3. The airside is reached through a common security check located between Terminal 2 and Terminal 3.

The common airside passenger concourse is divided into piers, called A, B, C, D, E and F. Pier A and B are for flights inside Schengen only. Pier C is mostly for flights outside Schengen. Pier D is mostly for flights inside Schengen. The newest section, CPH Go, now called Pier F, dedicated to low-cost carriers opened in October 2010. So far, EasyJet, Transavia and Ryanair are the only airlines operating from this facility. An all new Terminal 4 has been discussed, but replaced by plans to expand the current facilities in appropriate increments. Copenhagen Airport says passengers have easy transfer possibilities.

Previously all domestic flights departed from Terminal 1, but from 29 March 2015 all departures have been collected in Terminals 2 and 3, and Pier C was expanded with another jetbridge at DKK 10M to facilitate the Emirates Airbus A380 to Dubai from December 2015, which was the first 2-class A380 carrying 615 passengers.

Pier E began construction in 2016 and was finished in May 2019 and opened on 4 June 2019. SAS have moved most of its long-haul flight from pier C to E.

=== Runways ===
Despite the short distance to the city centre, approaches to, and departures from, the airport are above water due to the heading of the dual parallel runway system (04R/22L & 04L/22R). Those runways point to the Øresund strait, close in both directions. The supplementary runway (30/12) oriented perpendicular to the main runways also has its approach or departure over Øresund in one direction. In the opposite direction, the 30/12 runway has noise restrictions as flight happens close over residential areas. Other advantages are the low altitude of the airport and absence of hills and high buildings below the approach directions. In case of fog, the runway 22L is equipped with an ILS category III C system, which allows modern aircraft to land in zero sight. Runway 04R/22L was widened by 4 meters in each side at DKK 30M to accommodate the Airbus A380, as part of a general concrete renewal program of DKK 300M.

== Airlines and destinations ==
=== Passenger ===
The following airlines operate regular scheduled and charter flights at Copenhagen Airport:

| Airlines | Destinations | Refs |
|---|---|---|
| Aegean Airlines | Athens | |
| Air Cairo | Seasonal: Sharm El Sheikh | |
| Air Canada | Toronto–Pearson; Seasonal: Montréal–Trudeau | |
| Air China | Beijing–Capital, Reykjavík–Keflavík | |
| Air France | Paris–Charles de Gaulle | |
| Air Greenland | Ilulissat, Nuuk; Seasonal: Kangerlussuaq | |
| Air Serbia | Belgrade | |
| airBaltic | Riga | |
| AJet | Istanbul–Sabiha Gökçen; Seasonal: Bodrum | |
| Alsie Express | Karup/Midtjylland, Sønderborg | |
| American Airlines | Seasonal: Philadelphia | |
| Atlantic Airways | Vágar | |
| Austrian Airlines | Vienna; Seasonal: Innsbruck | |
| British Airways | London–Heathrow | |
| Brussels Airlines | Brussels | |
| China Eastern Airlines | Shanghai–Pudong | |
| Croatia Airlines | Zagreb; Seasonal: Split | |
| DAT | Bornholm | |
| Delta Air Lines | Seasonal: Minneapolis/St. Paul, New York–JFK | |
| easyJet | Amsterdam, Basel/Mulhouse, Berlin, Bristol, Edinburgh, Geneva, London–Gatwick, Manchester, Milan–Linate; Seasonal: Birmingham, Newcastle upon Tyne, Palma de Mallorca | |
| Egyptair | Cairo | |
| Emirates | Dubai–International | |
| Ethiopian Airlines | Addis Ababa, Vienna | |
| Etihad Airways | Abu Dhabi | |
| Eurowings | Cologne/Bonn (begins 7 May 2027), Düsseldorf, Stuttgart (begins 29 March 2027) | |
| Finnair | Helsinki | |
| FlyOne | Chișinău | |
| Iberia Express | Madrid | |
| Icelandair | Reykjavík–Keflavík | |
| Jet2.com | Seasonal: Birmingham, Leeds/Bradford, Newcastle upon Tyne | |
| KLM | Amsterdam | |
| LOT Polish Airlines | Warsaw–Chopin | |
| Lufthansa | Frankfurt, Munich | |
| Luxair | Luxembourg | |
| Middle East Airlines | Beirut | |
| Norwegian Air Shuttle | Aalborg, Alicante, Amsterdam, Barcelona, Bergen, Berlin, Budapest, Edinburgh, Faro, Gran Canaria, Helsinki, Kraków, Lisbon, London–Gatwick, Madrid, Málaga, Manchester, Marrakesh, Nice, Oslo, Paris–Charles de Gaulle, Prague, Riga, Rome–Fiumicino, Stavanger, Stockholm–Arlanda, Tenerife–South, Trondheim; Seasonal: Agadir, Athens, Bari, Basel/Mulhouse, Bastia, Bergamo, Bilbao, Bologna, Bordeaux, Burgas, Catania, Chania, Cluj-Napoca, Corfu, Dubai–Al Maktoum, Dublin, Dubrovnik, Geneva, Heraklion, Hurghada, Ljubljana, Malta, Montpellier, Munich, Naples, Newcastle upon Tyne, Olbia, Palermo, Palma de Mallorca, Pisa, Porto, Preveza/Lefkada, Pristina, Pula, Rhodes, Salzburg, Santiago de Compostela (begins 19 June 2027), Sarajevo, Seville (begins 24 March 2027), Split, Tangier, Tbilisi, Tirana, Tivat, Toulouse, Tromsø, Valencia, Venice, Zadar | |
| Pegasus Airlines | Antalya, Istanbul–Sabiha Gökçen; Seasonal: Ankara | |
| Qatar Airways | Doha | |
| Ryanair | Alicante, Barcelona, Bergamo, Birmingham, Bristol, Bologna, Budapest, Dublin, Edinburgh, Faro, Gdańsk, Kaunas, Kraków, Liverpool, London–Stansted, Madrid, Málaga, Manchester, Porto, Poznan, Prague, Rome–Fiumicino, Sofia, Treviso, Turin; Seasonal: Beauvais, Naples, Olbia, Palma de Mallorca, Pisa, Warsaw–Modlin, Zadar | |
| SalamAir | Baghdad, (Note: Baghdad serves as a stop on the route, before the plane continues to Muscat.) Muscat | |
| Scandinavian Airlines | Aalborg, Aarhus, Aberdeen, Alicante, Amsterdam, Athens, Atlanta, Barcelona, Bergen, Berlin, Bilbao, Billund, Birmingham, Bologna, Boston, Brussels, Budapest, Chicago–O'Hare, Dublin, Düsseldorf, Faro, Frankfurt, Gdańsk, Geneva, Gothenburg, Hamburg, Hanover, Helsinki, Kraków, Kristiansand, Larnaca, Lisbon, London–Heathrow, Los Angeles, Luxembourg, Lyon, Madrid, Málaga, Manchester, Milan–Linate, Milan–Malpensa, Mumbai–Shivaji, Munich, New York–JFK, Newark, Nice, Oslo, Palanga, Palma de Mallorca, Paris–Charles de Gaulle, Porto, Poznań, Prague, Reykjavík–Keflavík, Riga, Rome–Fiumicino, Salzburg, Sandefjord, San Francisco, Seoul–Incheon, Stavanger, Stockholm–Arlanda, Stuttgart, Tallinn, Tokyo–Haneda, Toronto–Pearson, Tromsø, Trondheim, Venice, Vienna, Vilnius, Warsaw–Chopin, Washington–Dulles, Wrocław, Zürich; Seasonal: Agadir, Ålesund, Antalya, Bari, Bangkok–Suvarnabhumi, Biarritz, Bodø, Bordeaux, Cagliari, Catania, Chania, Corfu, Dalaman, Dubrovnik, Edinburgh, Florence, Fuerteventura, Funchal, Gazipaşa, Genoa, Gran Canaria, Harstad/Narvik, Heraklion, Ibiza, Kiruna, Kittilä, Krabi (begins 9 December 2026), Ljubljana (begins 25 June 2027), Malta, Marrakesh, Marseille, Menorca (begins 30 June 2027), Miami, Montpellier, Naples, Olbia, Östersund, Palermo, Pisa, Pristina, Phuket (begins 8 December 2026), Pula, Rhodes, Rovaniemi, Sälen-Trysil, Santorini, Seattle/Tacoma, Seville, Split, Tenerife–South, Thessaloniki, Tirana, Tivat, Vágar, Valencia, Varna, Visby, Zakynthos | |
| Singapore Airlines | Singapore | |
| SkyAlps | Seasonal: Bolzano | |
| Sola Air | Karlstad | |
| Sundor | Seasonal: Tel Aviv | |
| SunExpress | Seasonal: Ankara, Antalya, Izmir, Kayseri, Konya | |
| Swiss International Air Lines | Geneva, Zürich | |
| Syrian Air | Damascus | |
| TAP Air Portugal | Lisbon | |
| Thai Airways International | Bangkok–Suvarnabhumi | |
| Transavia | Paris–Orly; Seasonal: Eindhoven | |
| Turkish Airlines | Istanbul | |
| Vietnam Airlines | Ho Chi Minh City | |
| Volotea | Strasbourg, Nantes; Seasonal: Marseille | |
| Vueling | Barcelona | |
| Widerøe | Sandefjord | |
| Wizz Air | Bucharest–Otopeni, Budapest, Chișinău, Gdańsk, Warsaw–Chopin | |

=== Cargo ===
| Airlines | Destinations |
|---|---|
| Emirates SkyCargo | Atlanta, Chicago–O'Hare, Columbus–Rickenbacker, Dubai–Al Maktoum, Houston–Intercontinental, Los Angeles, Mexico City |
| Ethiopian Airlines Cargo | Addis Ababa, Liège |
| FedEx Express | Liège, Paris–Charles de Gaulle |
| LATAM Cargo Brasil | Campinas |
| West Atlantic | Kristiansand |

== Statistics ==
=== Passenger numbers ===
Passenger numbers at Copenhagen Airport
| Year | Passengers handled (Note: Number of passengers including domestic, international and transit) | Passenger % change | Aircraft movements | Aircraft % change |
|---|---|---|---|---|
| 2001 | 18,082,158 | Steady | 288,738 | Steady |
| 2002 | 18,253,446 | ▲0.9 | 266,896 | ▼7.6 |
| 2003 | 17,707,742 | ▼3.0 | 259,002 | ▼3.0 |
| 2004 | 19,034,557 | ▲7.5 | 272,512 | ▲5.2 |
| 2005 | 19,980,301 | ▲5.0 | 268,652 | ▼1.4 |
| 2006 | 20,877,533 | ▲4.5 | 258,354 | ▼3.8 |
| 2007 | 21,409,886 | ▲2.5 | 257,587 | ▼0.3 |
| 2008 | 21,529,857 | ▲0.6 | 264,086 | ▲2.5 |
| 2009 | 19,715,317 | ▼8.4 | 236,170 | ▼10.6 |
| 2010 | 21,501,473 | ▲9.1 | 245,635 | ▲4.0 |
| 2011 | 22,725,284 | ▲5.7 | 253,759 | ▲3.3 |
| 2012 | 23,334,939 | ▲2.7 | 242,990 | ▼4.2 |
| 2013 | 24,066,917 | ▲3.1 | 244,933 | ▲0.8 |
| 2014 | 25,627,093 | ▲6.5 | 251,799 | ▲2.8 |
| 2015 | 26,608,869 | ▲3.8 | 254,832 | ▲1.2 |
| 2016 | 29,043,287 | ▲9.2 | 265,784 | ▲4.2 |
| 2017 | 29,177,833 | ▲0.5 | 259,243 | ▼2.5 |
| 2018 | 30,298,531 | ▲3.8 | 266,096 | ▲2.6 |
| 2019 | 30,256,703 | ▼0.1 | 263,411 | ▼1 |
| 2020 | 7,525,441 | ▼75.1 | 98,239 | ▼62.7 |
| 2021 | 9,179,654 | ▲22.0 | 109,925 | ▲11.9 |
| 2022 | 22,143,135 | ▲141.0 | 202,232 | ▲84.0 |
| 2023 | 26,765,446 | ▲21.0 | 227,343 | ▲12.0 |
| 2024 | 29,882,553 | ▲11.6 | 240,680 | ▲5.9 |
| 2025 | 32,433,694 | ▲8.5 | 256,737 | ▲6.7 |

=== Busiest routes ===
Top 10 busiest routes by passenger traffic (2023)
| Rank | Destination | Airport(s) | Passengers |
|---|---|---|---|
| 1 | London | Heathrow Airport, Gatwick Airport, Stansted Airport | 1,822,894 |
| 2 | Oslo | Gardermoen Airport | 1,355,213 |
| 3 | Stockholm | Arlanda Airport | 1,187,479 |
| 4 | Amsterdam | Schiphol Airport | 1,124,306 |
| 5 | Aalborg | Aalborg Airport | 792,198 |
| 6 | Istanbul | Istanbul Airport, Sabiha Gökçen International Airport | 621,191 |
| 7 | Helsinki | Helsinki Airport | 601,605 |
| 8 | Frankfurt | Frankfurt Airport | 548,125 |
| 9 | Vienna | Vienna International Airport | 538,844 |
| 10 | Paris | Charles de Gaulle Airport | 340,404 |

=== Passenger numbers, 2023 ===
| 1 | Domestic flight | 1,198,624 |
| 2 | Europe | 22,697,847 |
| 3 | Transatlantic flight | 2,868,975 |

== Other facilities ==
The SAS traffic office resides at Copenhagen Airport South and in Dragør, together with a VIP terminal. The VIP terminal is actually the first terminal building, from the 1920s. It was moved about 2 km during the 1990s.

In 2015, Boeing opened a maintenance, repair, and operations facility at CPH, as proximity to daily operations is more important than high wages when checks have to be made every 1,000 flight hours.

== Ground transport ==
Within the airport area, special airport buses depart every 15 minutes. The bus line connects all terminals and car park areas and uses in all 11 bus stops. The transport is free of charge for all. During a few night hours, the buses depart every 20 minutes instead.

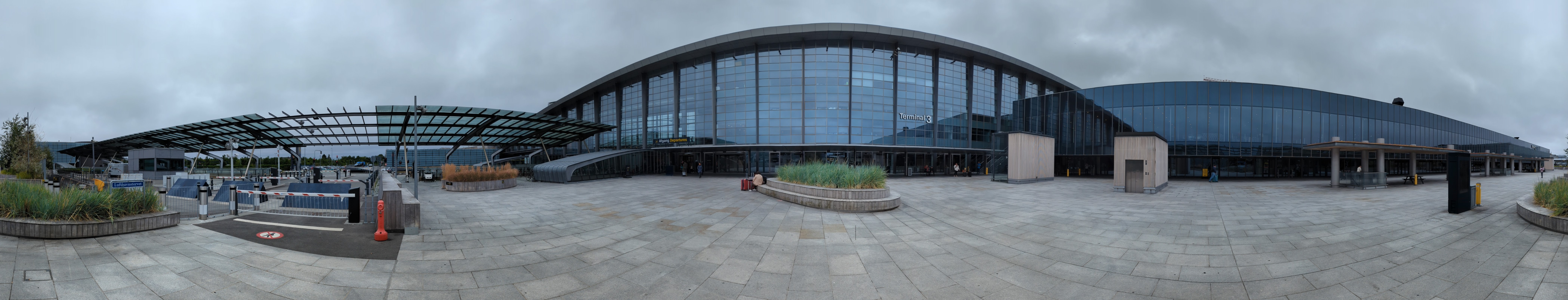
Panoramic view within the walking route between Terminal 3 (center) and Terminal 2 (right)

=== Train ===
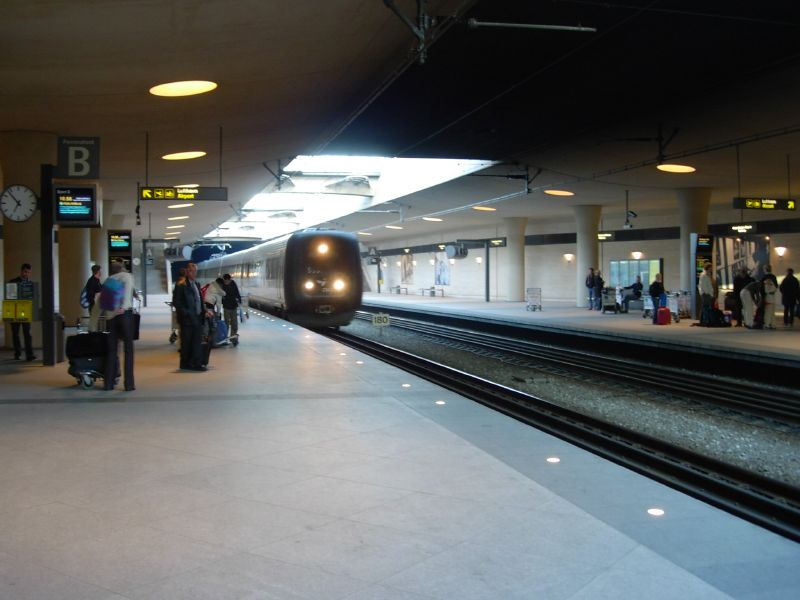
Train towards Copenhagen Central Station at the Copenhagen Airport railway station

The airport's railway station is located underneath Terminal 3 on the Øresund Railway Line.

- The station is served by trains operated by Skånetrafiken as part of the Øresundståg service between Copenhagen and different destinations across southern Sweden. Øresundståg operates regional and intercity trains to: Malmö, Gothenburg, Helsingborg, Kalmar, Karlskrona, and Kristianstad.
- DSB, the Danish national rail operator, have InterCity and InterCityExpress trains calling at this station. Domestic destinations include Esbjerg, Aarhus, Aalborg and Sønderborg.
- Swedish SJ runs several high-speed trains with daily departures between Copenhagen central station (København H) and Stockholm central station (Stockholm C) and Gothenburg (Göteborg). These trains all call at the Copenhagen Airport station (København Lufthavn/Kastrup).

=== Metro ===
Line M2 of the Copenhagen Metro links the airport with the city centre in around 15 minutes. The Metro station is two floors above the underground rail station and continues on elevated tracks until it goes underground after five stations. The metro trains run very frequently, in rush hours every four minutes, outside rush hours and on weekends every six minutes, and every 15/20 minutes at night. The metro runs to Kongens Nytorv station amongst other stations, where connections can be made to the City Circle that runs through the Østerbro, Nørrebro, Frederiksberg districts amongst other places in Copenhagen.

=== Road ===
- Movia buses 5C, 35, 36 and Gråhundbus line 999 all stop at the airport; bus 888, express-bus to Jutland, also stops at the airport. Movia bus 2A stops near the airport. There are long-distance buses to Sweden and Norway operated by Swebus: 820 to Oslo via Gothenburg and 832 to Uppsala via Stockholm. GoByBus and Bus4You also operate the same routes.
- The E20 motorway runs right by the airport. The E20 uses the toll road Øresund Bridge to Sweden. The airport has 8,600 parking spaces.

== Incidents and accidents ==
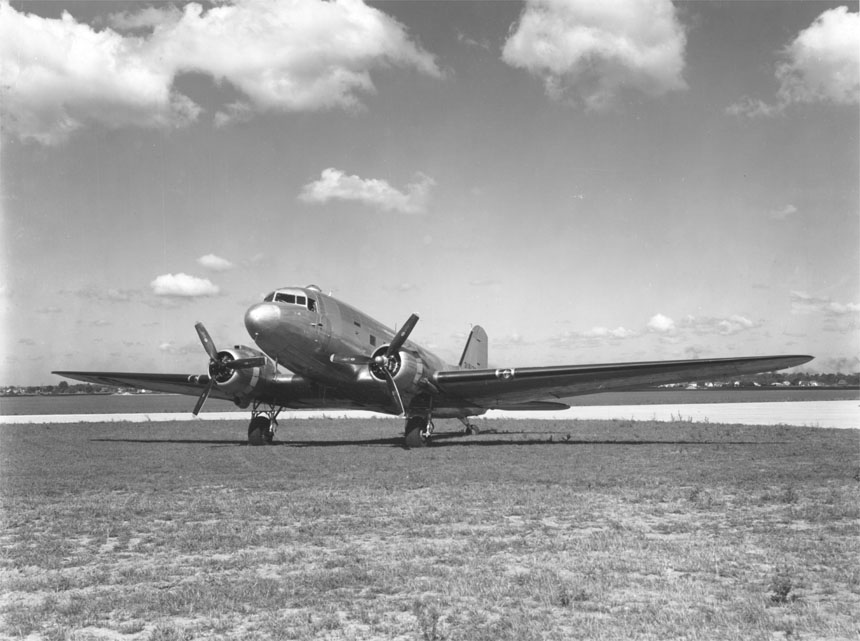
A Douglas Dakota, similar to the KLM aircraft that crashed in 1947

- 26 January 1947: Douglas Dakota (DC-3), PH-TCR of KLM crashed after takeoff from Copenhagen, killing all 22 on board, including Prince Gustaf Adolf of Sweden (father of present king Carl XVI Gustaf) and American singer and actress Grace Moore. The delayed KLM flight from Amsterdam had landed at Copenhagen for a routine stop before continuing to Stockholm. Soon after the Douglas DC-3 aircraft took off, it climbed to an altitude of about 50 metres (160 ft), stalled, and plummeted nose-first to the ground where it exploded on impact. The investigation showed that the crash had been caused by a forgotten elevator gust lock. Short of time, the captain never performed his checklist and took off not realising the lock was still in place. See 1947 KLM Douglas DC-3 Copenhagen accident.
- 16 July 1960: de Havilland DH.89A Dragon Rapide OY-DZY, chartered by the Danish Football Association, crashed into the Øresund shortly after takeoff amid strong winds and heavy rain, killing all 8 passengers and seriously injuring the pilot. The exact cause was undetermined.
- 17 November 1957: Vickers Viscount G-AOHP of British European Airways crashed at Ballerup after the failure of three engines on approach to Copenhagen Airport. The cause was a malfunction of the anti-icing system on the aircraft.
- 28 August 1971: a Malév Ilyushin Il-18, HA-MOC crashed into the sea while executing an instrument approach. The main cause of the accident was a microburst, a particularly dangerous and unpredictable meteorological phenomenon. 23 passengers and the crew of nine died. Two passengers survived. The captain of the plane was World War II flying ace of the Royal Hungarian Air Force, Dezső Szentgyörgyi. He was due to retire in less than three weeks.

== See also ==
- List of airports in Denmark
- List of the busiest airports in the Nordic countries
- List of the busiest airports in the European Union
