= Lübeck Air =

German regional airline

Lubeck Air was a small German virtual regional airline which was based at Lübeck Airport. The company was founded in 2016 for business and charter flights. It commenced scheduled operations in 2020 and ceased operations in 2023.
