= Civil Aviation Administration Denmark =

Coordinates: 55°39′01.46″N 012°31′19.95″E

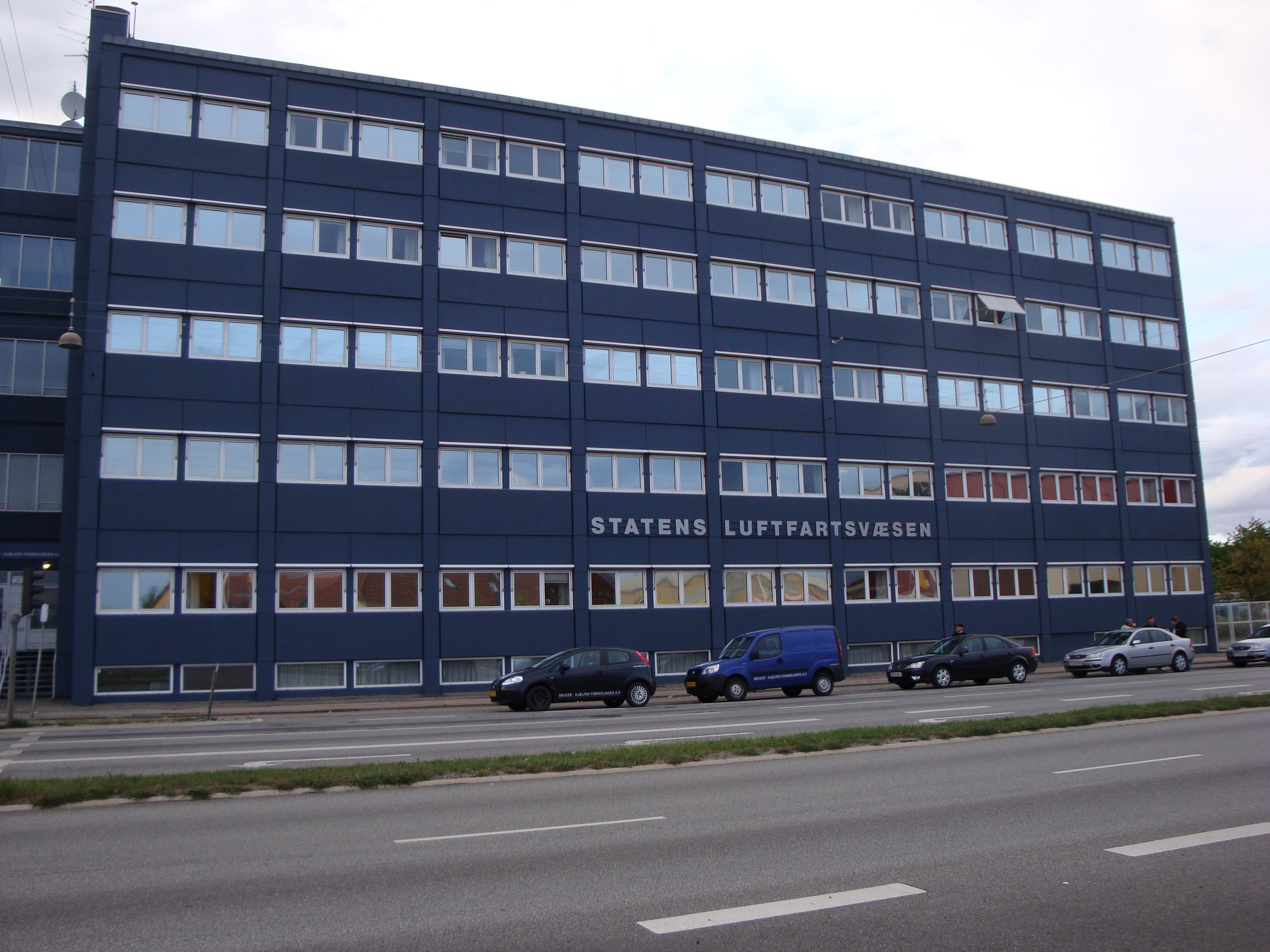
Civil Aviation Administration Denmark building in Copenhagen, Denmark

Civil Aviation Administration Denmark (CAA-DK). (Danish: Statens Luftfartsvæsen, SLV) was the Danish government agency that oversaw all civil aviation in Denmark, including the autonomous areas of Greenland and the Faroe Islands.

CAA-DK, with its head office in Copenhagen, was part of the Danish Ministry of Transport (Danish: Transportministeriet). In addition to the regulation of civil aviation, it also operated the Bornholm Airport.

On 1 November 2010 the Danish Transport Authority (Danish: Trafikstyrelsen) and the Civil Aviation Administration - Denmark were merged to one administration. The name of the new administration is the Danish Transport Authority. The former CAA-DK attends to the same tasks as before and remains at the same address.
