= Sønderborg Airport =

Sønderborg Airport Sønderborg Lufthavn
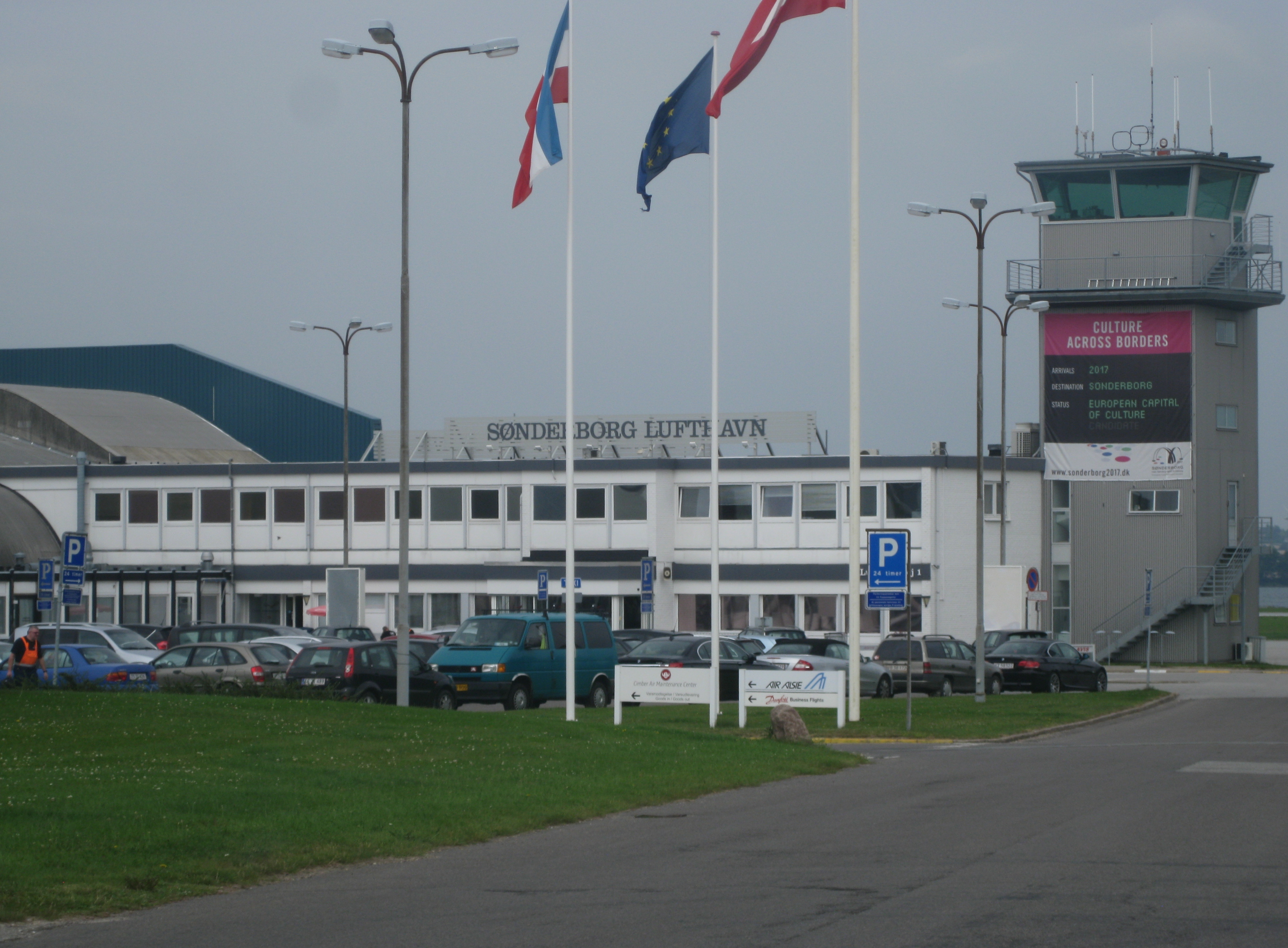
- IATA: SGD; ICAO: EKSB

Summary
- Airport type: Public
- Location: Sønderborg
- Elevation AMSL: 24 ft (7.3 m)
- Coordinates: 54°57′52″N 009°47′30.23″E

Map
- Location of airport in Denmark

Runways
Direction	Length		Surface
Direction	ft	m	Surface
14/32	5,895	1,797	Asphalt

Statistics (2019)
- Passengers: 73.821
- Aircraft movements: 11,746

Sønderborg Airport (Danish: Sønderborg Lufthavn) (IATA: SGD, ICAO: EKSB) is an airport located in Sønderborg, Denmark. The airport officially opened in 1968; however, the first flights took place in 1950, and were flown by Sønderjyllands Flyveselskab.

== Airlines and destinations ==
The following airlines operate regular scheduled and charter flights at the airport:

Airlines	Destinations
Alsie Express	Copenhagen, Jersey (begins 25 July 2026); Seasonal: Bornholm (resumes 26 June 2026)

Cimber Sterling operated flights to Copenhagen until 3 May 2012, when the airline filed for bankruptcy. DAT took over the route to Copenhagen just hours after. In April 2013 Alsie Express was founded and started operating between Sønderborg and Copenhagen. Soon after Alsie Express started flying, DAT stopped operating the route.

== Ground transport ==
The airport is located 7 km (4.3 mi) from Sønderborg city. Transfer is by taxi or own car. Rental cars are also available at the airport. Other cities for which the airport is useful include Åbenrå (41 km (25 mi)), Tønder (70 km (43 mi)) and Flensburg (in Germany, 55 km (34 mi)).

== See also ==
- List of the largest airports in the Nordic countries
